= Lithobates lenca =

Lenca leopard frog

Conservation status
- Endangered (IUCN 3.1)

Scientific classification
- Kingdom: Animalia
- Phylum: Chordata
- Class: Amphibia
- Order: Anura
- Family: Ranidae
- Genus: Lithobates
- Species: L. lenca

Binomial name
- Lithobates lenca (Luque-Montes et al., 2018)

Synonyms
- Rana lenca Luque-Montes et al. 2018

Species of amphibian

The Lenca leopard frog (Lithobates lenca) is a species of true frog found in the Chortis Highlands of southwestern Honduras at altitudes of 1560 to 2080 m. This frog was long thought to be a hybrid between the two lowland species Lithobates brownorum and Lithobates forreri until 2018 when DNA tests proved the highland leopard frogs to be a distinct species. They are smaller in size but have larger heads than the two lowland species, with males growing between 46.6–64.3 mm (1.83–2.53 in) while females grow between 43.7–76.3 mm (1.72–3 in). The Lenca leopard frog is named after the Lenca people, who inhabit the same mountainous region as the frog.
