= Guatemala plateau frog =

Conservation status
- Vulnerable (IUCN 3.1)

Scientific classification
- Kingdom: Animalia
- Phylum: Chordata
- Class: Amphibia
- Order: Anura
- Family: Ranidae
- Genus: Lithobates
- Species: L. macroglossa

Binomial name
- Lithobates macroglossa (Brocchi, 1877)

Synonyms
- Rana macroglossa Brocchi, 1877

Species of amphibian

The Guatemala plateau frog (Lithobates macroglossa) is a species of frog in the family Ranidae. It occurs in Guatemala and southern Mexico. It is impossible to morphologically distinguish this species from Lithobates forreri and Lithobates brownorum, and the validity of it has been questioned. It is an uncommon frog that inhabits cloud forests, including degraded forest, and grassland. Breeding takes place in streams and small temporary ponds. It is threatened by habitat degradation caused by agricultural encroachment, wood extraction, human settlement, and water pollution.
