= Patzcuaro frog =

Conservation status
- Endangered (IUCN 3.1)

Scientific classification
- Kingdom: Animalia
- Phylum: Chordata
- Class: Amphibia
- Order: Anura
- Family: Ranidae
- Genus: Lithobates
- Species: L. dunni

Binomial name
- Lithobates dunni (Zweifel, 1957)

Synonyms
- Rana dunni Zweifel, 1957

Species of amphibian

The Patzcuaro frog (Lithobates dunni or Rana dunni) is a species of frog in the family Ranidae. Within the former, broadly defined genus Rana, it belongs to the Rana montezumae (=Lithobates montezumae) subgroup of the Rana pipiens (=Lithobates pipiens) complex. It is endemic to Michoacán state, Mexico, where it is locally known as rana de Pátzcuaro. It occurs in Lake Pátzcuaro, Lake Cuitzeo, and the surrounding streams in Río de Morelia.

== Etymology ==
The specific name dunni honors Emmett Reid Dunn, a prominent American herpetologist.

== Description ==
Females grow to at least 97 mm (3.8 in) and males, based on the only adult male in the type series, to 71 mm (2.8 in) in snout–vent length. The body is chunky and the limbs are short and thick. The tympanum is distinct; the post-tympanic fold is indistinct. The dorso-lateral folds are weak. The toes are fully webbed and have rounded tips. Skin is dorsally very pustulose. The dorsum is dark grey with few indistinct, asymmetric yellow-gray markings. The head is yellowish-white and has some gray spotting. The ventral surfaces are white, apart from the gray chest and chin. Males have a paired vocal sac.

== Habitat and conservation ==
Patzcuaro frog is an aquatic frog living in deep water with abundant nutrients. Most of the types were collected in shallow water (0.2–0.5 m (6–18 in) deep) with abundant vegetation. The diet includes at least snails of the genus Physa. Males call throughout the year. Reproduction takes place in the streams.

A major threat to this species is harvesting—it is considered delicious by local people. Once common, over-exploitation has greatly reduced its abundance. It is not known to occur in any protected area.
