= Mayaro Bay =

Beach in Trinidad and Tobago

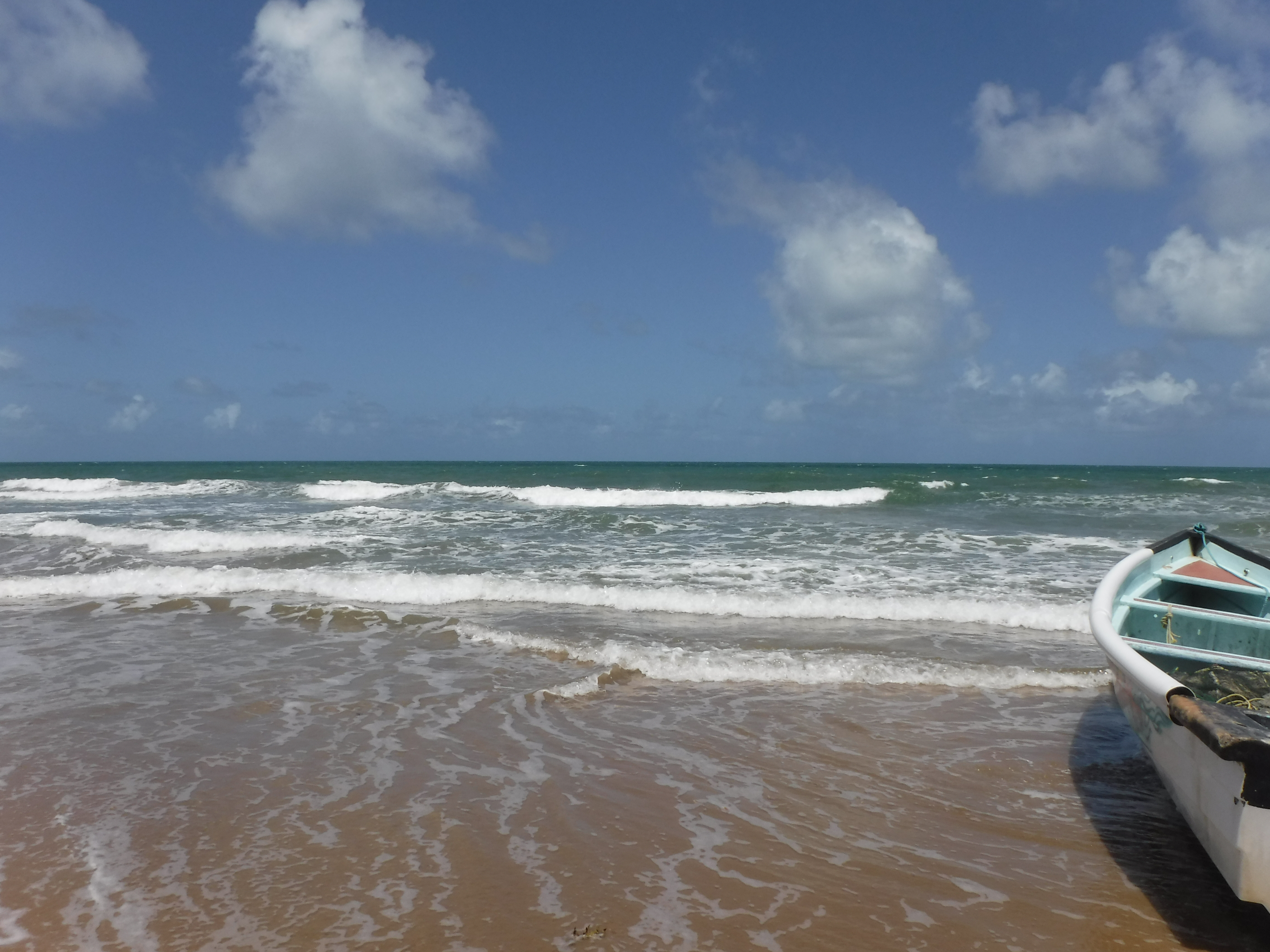
- Interactive map of Mayaro Bay
- Location: Trinidad and Tobago
- Nearest town: Mayaro
- Coordinates: 10.236050°N 61.001628°W
- Operator: Mayaro–Rio Claro
- Status: Open all year
- Designation: Public beach

Mayaro Bay stretches for nine miles on the east coast of the island of the Republic of Trinidad and Tobago. The beach which lines the bay, Mayaro Beach, is a popular destination for holidays, long weekends, and is one of the traditional places to spend the Easter holidays. Not only do beach-goers swim, but they also kayak, bird watch, camp, and occasionally kite surf, making Mayaro a tourist hot spot. Located at the southern end of Manzanilla Beach, Trinidad and Tobago, one can reach Mayaro Beach by traveling along the Mayaro–Guayaguayare road or the Mayaro–Naparima road.

== History ==
=== Etymology ===
The name Mayaro originates from maya, a plant that grew in abundance locally, and ‘ro’ meaning ‘the place of’ in an Arawak tongue.

=== European contact ===
French planters and African slaves were the first to settle the beach in 1783, after receiving land offered by the Spanish governor at the time, Don Jose Maria Chacon. Chacon welcomed the French planters, as they were fleeing from unrest in French islands, such as Martinique and Guadeloupe. Chacon's motives behind inviting the French planters would soon emerge, as the planters later aided Chacon in developing the profitable features of the island. After some time, residents managed to secure sixty-five cotton plantations, with a few others growing coffee and sugar cane, despite lacking roads in the area. By 1818, twenty-one new plantations were added as the bay grew more popular. In response to the rapid growth, Governor Sir Ralph James provided a steamboat to transport commodities and supplies around Trinidad.

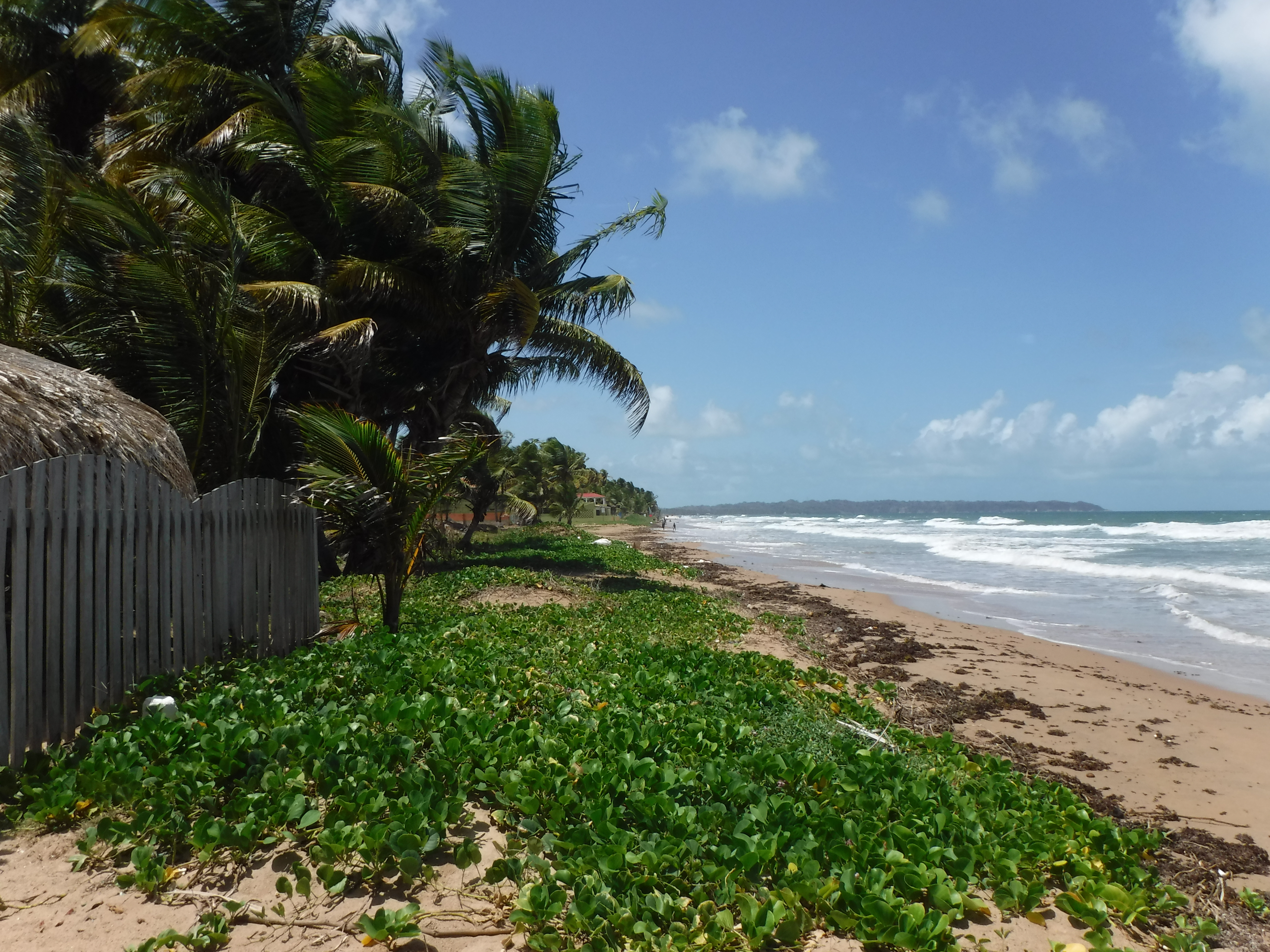
An example of vegetation thriving on the shore of Mayaro Beach (4/11/2016).

When slaves were emancipated in 1838, land belonging to whites was allocated and given to the freedmen. In 1849, however, Lord Harris passed a pay ward system which stripped land from newly freed Africans that were unwilling to pay the rates. The system would later change in 1870 when the concept of government schools was adopted.

=== Further development ===
Shortly after, surveyor St. Luce D'Abadie connected Mayaro Beach to Mission (modern-day Prince's Town) in the 1860s. D'Abadie traced the road on the request of Lord Harris before leaving the isle. This new road did not affect round-island transportation via the steamer, as it was still a popular form of transit. It would be around this time when the first police station in Mayaro was installed, in order to control the steadily growing population. Sugar cane production began to fade away as the attention turned to coconut plantations since coconut trees grew in abundance seaside and provided a steady income to farmers. The fishing industry would also expand and become an effective way to earn profit. Most of the great expansion and achievement in Mayaro occurred in the 20th century. The changing of times and growth of the population led to the first post office, constructed in 1913, which increased both the frequency and speed of mail delivery.

In the 21st century, Mayaro still continues to develop. It now has a roadway that links it to other locations on the isle, which allowed for a rise in populace and multifarious business. Upon the discovery of oil, the fishing and plantation town slowly shifted into the oil and gas industry Even with said expansion, Mayaro is still considered a paradise away from the hustling cities, such as Port of Spain.

== Geography ==
=== Biodiversity ===
In terms of woodland, eastern Trinidad is carpeted by Mora excelsa, a type of tree. The mora forest extends through the Mayaro Bay and Matura Bay. Mayaro forests provide a habitat for red howler monkeys, who have traditionally been hunted for their meat. Despite this, troops of the red howler monkey can be found in areas such as Chaguaramas and the forests located in the Mayaro area. Along with the red howler monkey, the Leptodactylus bolivianus or the Bolivian Tree frog (locally known as the edible frog or mountain chicken), inhabits the area. But the Bolivian Tree frog isn't the only amphibian to live in Mayaro Bay. The Amazon River frog (Lithobates palmipes), described as a "rare terrestrial frog" can also be found in the Mayaro forests. In terms of marine life, many species of fish thrive in Mayaro, further proving why villagers resorted to fishing to make a profit. Various species of Carangidae roam the waters of Mayaro Bay and are often captured by villagers by a seine. Mussels and oysters can also be found buried in the sand on the shoreline.

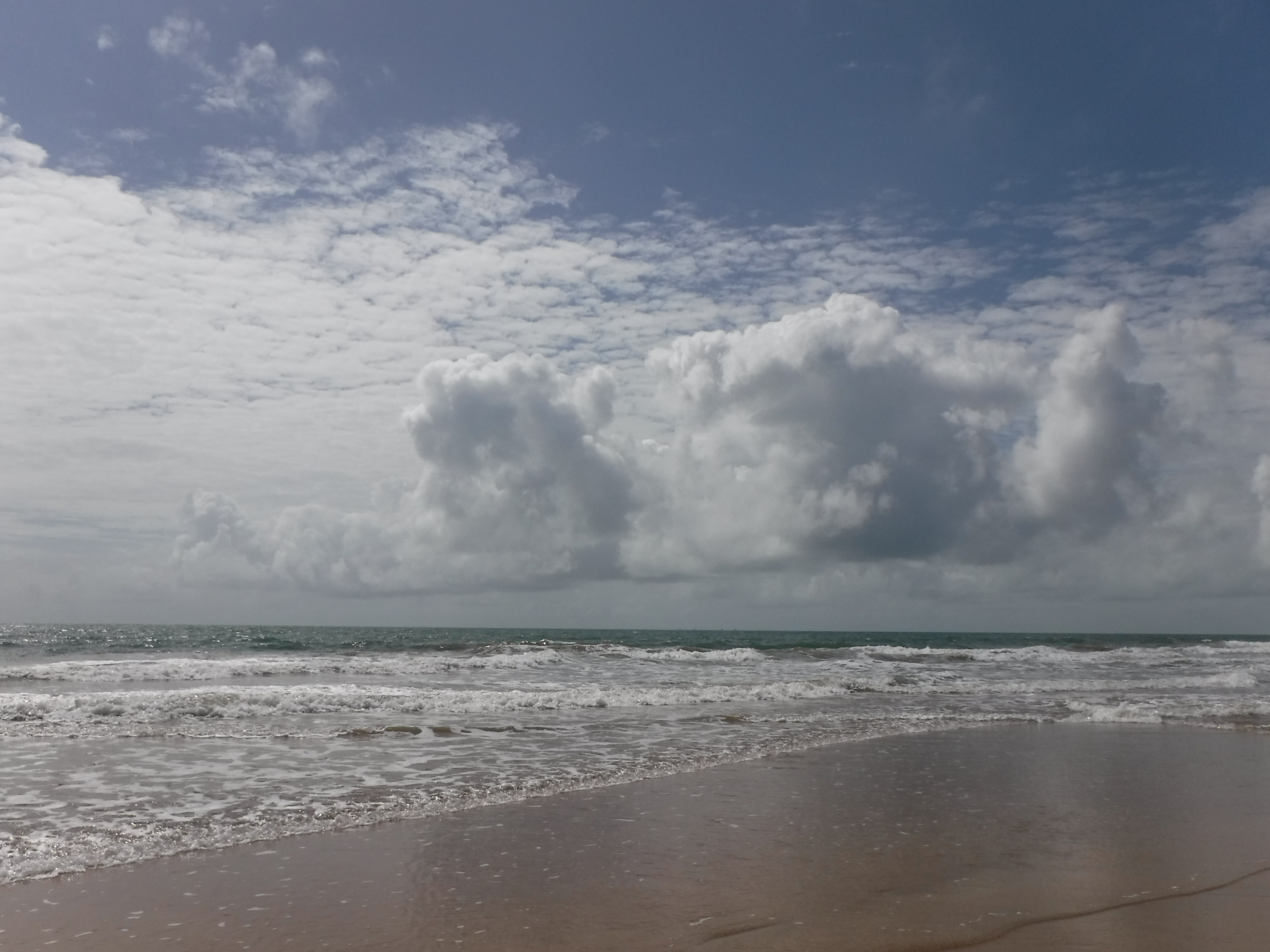
Mayaro Beach on a bright sunny day in the dry season (4/13/2016).

=== Climate ===
The climate of Mayaro Bay does not deviate noticeably from the overall climate of Trinidad and Tobago itself. The maximum temperature of the island can vary between 31–33 °C (88–91 °F) and the minimum temperature can vary between 20–23 °C (68–73 °F). However, depending on the month, the mean temperatures will shift between the two.

The annual average water temperature for Mayaro Beach is 28 °C (82 °F), but similar to the climate, the average water temperature varies based on the time of year. Warmer temperatures favor early fall, as the water heats up to 30.2 °C (86.4 °F) during the month of September. On the other hand, colder water temperatures typical occur during the month of February, when water measures to 25.7 °C (78.3 °F). Either way, water temperatures stay fairly warm year round on the beach.

=== Environmental concerns ===
Although the involvement of Mayaro in the petroleum industry has brought profits and prosperity to the area, oil tankers and other equipment harm the beach by releasing "petroleum based residue" into the blue waters and affecting the ecosystem beneath them. Along with issues caused by petroleum, Mayaro Bay faces damage from coastal erosion caused by climate change and rising sea levels. The water level surrounding the island steadily rises by 2 millimeters each year. Although Mayaro Bay was formed by the "erosion of unconsolidated sediments", the increased erosion over the years has begun to eat away at the shoreline.

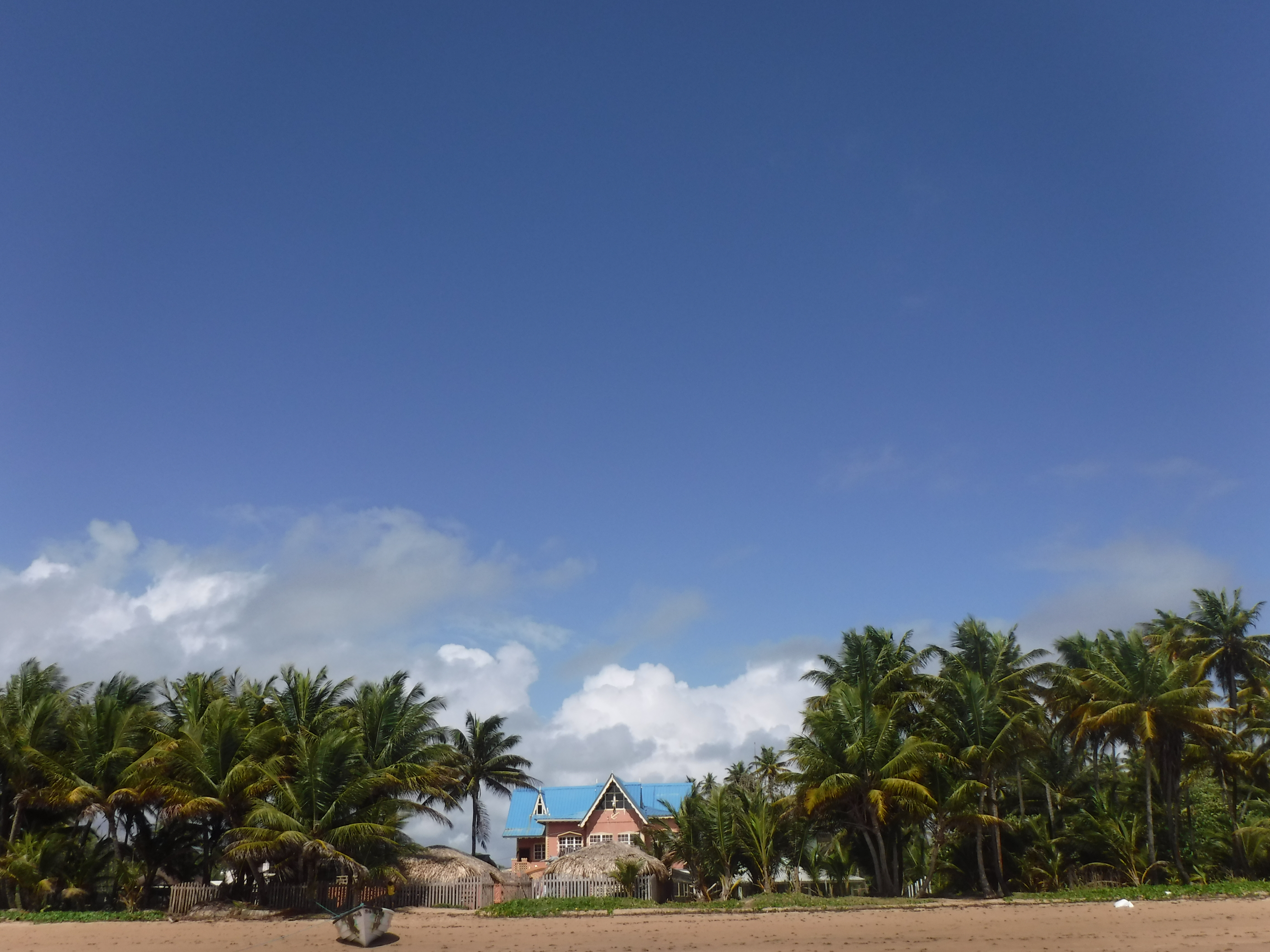
Tall, tropical coconut trees envelop a beachfront, pink and blue rental house (4/13/2016)

== Tourism ==
Unlike other beaches, such as Maracas and Las Cuevas, Mayaro is far less crowded and more private. This allows for an escape from the mass of tourists that pass through, as the privacy of the beach provides a true sense of relaxation. Despite this, luxurious resorts and commodious rental homes line the shore. Along with resorts, restaurants are also conveniently placed nearby to allow for easy access after a swim. In terms of attractions, the Brigand Hill Lighthouse is also in the area.

== See also ==
- Trinidad and Tobago
  - Maracas Beach
  - Pigeon Point, Tobago
  - Manzanilla Beach, Trinidad and Tobago
  - Port of Spain
