= R. trilobata =

R. trilobata may refer to:

- Rana trilobata, a synonym for Rana megapoda, a frog species endemic to Mexico
- Rhus trilobata, the sourberry, skunkbush or three-leaf sumac, a shrub species native to the western half of Canada and the United States

== See also ==
- Trilobata
