= Plateau frog (disambiguation) =

The plateau frog is a species of frog in the family Dicroglossidae.

Plateau frog may also refer to:

- Guatemala plateau frog, a frog found in Guatemala and Mexico
- Plateau brown frog, a frog endemic to China
