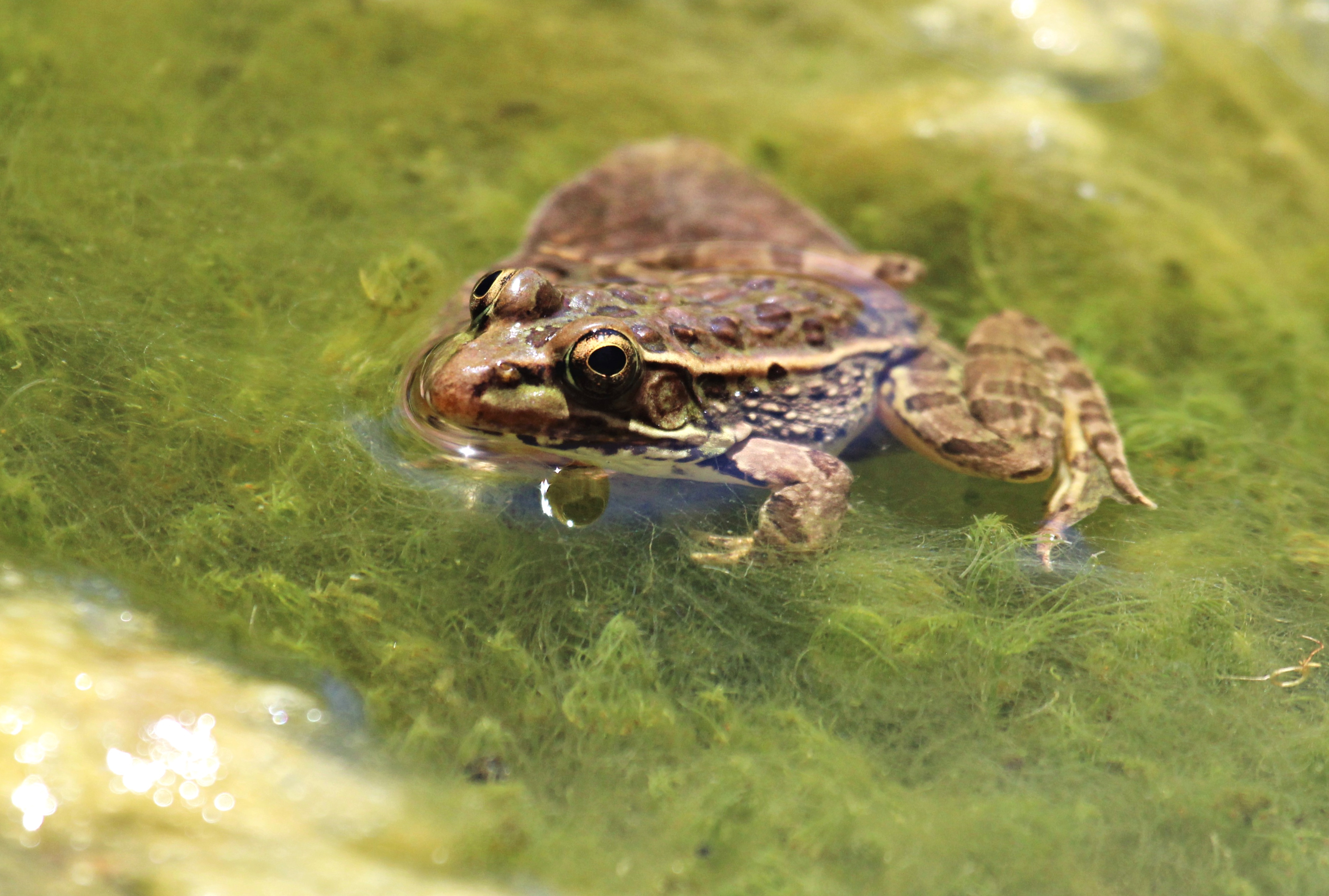

Conservation status
- Endangered (IUCN 3.1)

- Critically Imperiled (NatureServe)

Scientific classification
- Kingdom: Animalia
- Phylum: Chordata
- Class: Amphibia
- Order: Anura
- Family: Ranidae
- Genus: Lithobates
- Species: L. onca

Binomial name
- Lithobates onca (Cope, 1875)

Synonyms
- Rana onca Cope, 1875

= Relict leopard frog =

Species of amphibian

The relict leopard frog (Lithobates onca, formerly Rana onca) is a species of frog in the family Ranidae, endemic to the United States.

== Description ==
The vocalizations of the relict leopard frog have been described as a "low rumbling 'snore'." Individuals measure 4.4–8.4 cm (1.7–3.3 in), and have a narrow, brown-colored body with darker spots and a beige-colored streak on the upper lip. Relict leopard frogs are most nocturnal.

== Distribution and habitat ==
Its historic range is along the Colorado River in extreme northwestern Arizona, and adjacent Nevada and southwestern Utah, although true to its name, its present range seems to be restricted to the Lake Mead National Recreation Area in Nevada, rendering it extirpated in Arizona and Utah. Its natural habitat is freshwater springs and their outlets.

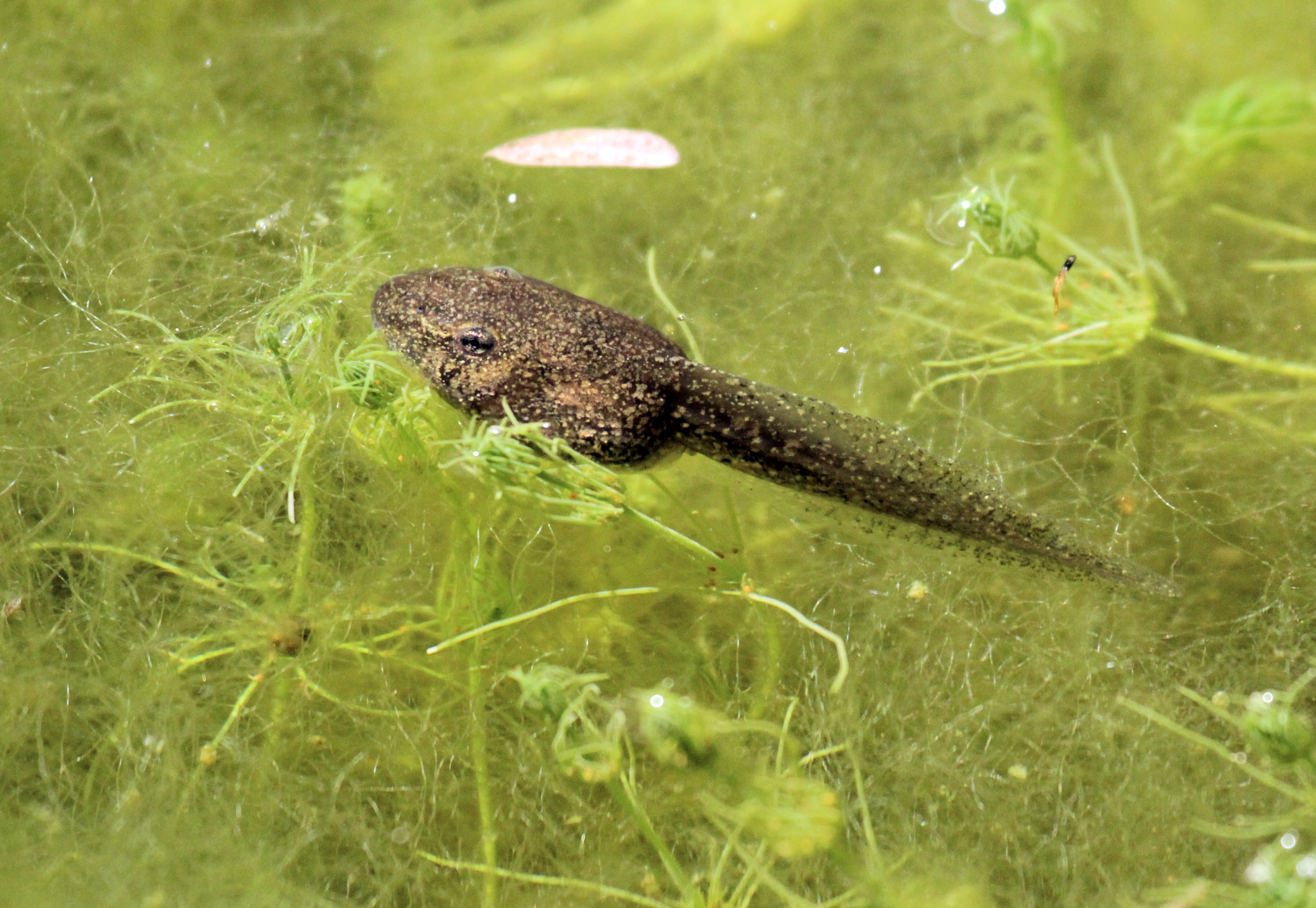
Tadpole

== Conservation ==
In the mid-20th century, the relict leopard frog was declared to be extinct. The species was rediscovered in the 1990s in the Virgin River and Muddy River watersheds in Nevada. It is threatened by habitat loss to agriculture and water development as well as invasive species.
