= Mexican cascades frog =

Conservation status
- Least Concern (IUCN 3.1)

Scientific classification
- Kingdom: Animalia
- Phylum: Chordata
- Class: Amphibia
- Order: Anura
- Family: Ranidae
- Genus: Lithobates
- Species: L. pustulosus

Binomial name
- Lithobates pustulosus (Boulenger, 1833)

Synonyms
- Rana pustulosa Boulenger, 1883; Rana sinaloae Zweifel, 1954

Species of amphibian

The Mexican cascades frog or white-striped frog (Lithobates pustulosus) is a species of frog in the family Ranidae endemic to Mexico, where it is known as rana de cascada.

Mexican cascades frog is a very common species inhabiting rocky cascading streams in tropical dry forest, possibly also coniferous forest at low to moderate elevations.
