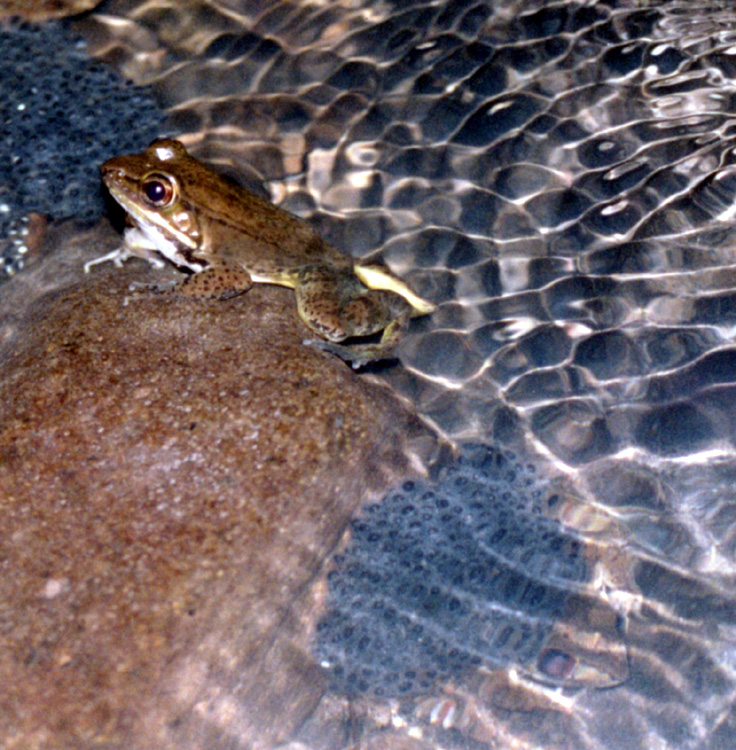

Conservation status
- Least Concern (IUCN 3.1)

Scientific classification
- Kingdom: Animalia
- Phylum: Chordata
- Class: Amphibia
- Order: Anura
- Family: Ranidae
- Genus: Lithobates
- Species: L. maculatus

Binomial name
- Lithobates maculatus Brocchi, 1877

Synonyms
- Rana maculata, Brocchi, 1877

= Highland frog =

Species of amphibian

The highland frog (Lithobates maculatus), also known as the masked mountain frog, is a species of frog in the family Ranidae, known from El Salvador, Guatemala, Honduras, Mexico, and Nicaragua. Its natural habitats are subtropical or tropical moist lowland forests, subtropical or tropical moist montane forests, rivers, and freshwater marshes. It is threatened by habitat loss.

Like other members of Lithobates, it is sometimes classified under the genus Rana.
