= Moore's frog =

Conservation status
- Vulnerable (IUCN 3.1)

Scientific classification
- Kingdom: Animalia
- Phylum: Chordata
- Class: Amphibia
- Order: Anura
- Family: Ranidae
- Genus: Lithobates
- Species: L. johni

Binomial name
- Lithobates johni Frost, 2006

Synonyms
- Rana moorei Blair, 1947 (preoccupied); Rana johni Blair, 1965

Species of amphibian

Moore's frog (Lithobates johni) is a species of frog in the true frog family (Ranidae). It is endemic to the Sierra Madre Oriental of Mexico.

Its natural habitats are subtropical or tropical moist lowland forests, subtropical or tropical moist montane forests, and rivers. It is threatened by habitat loss.
