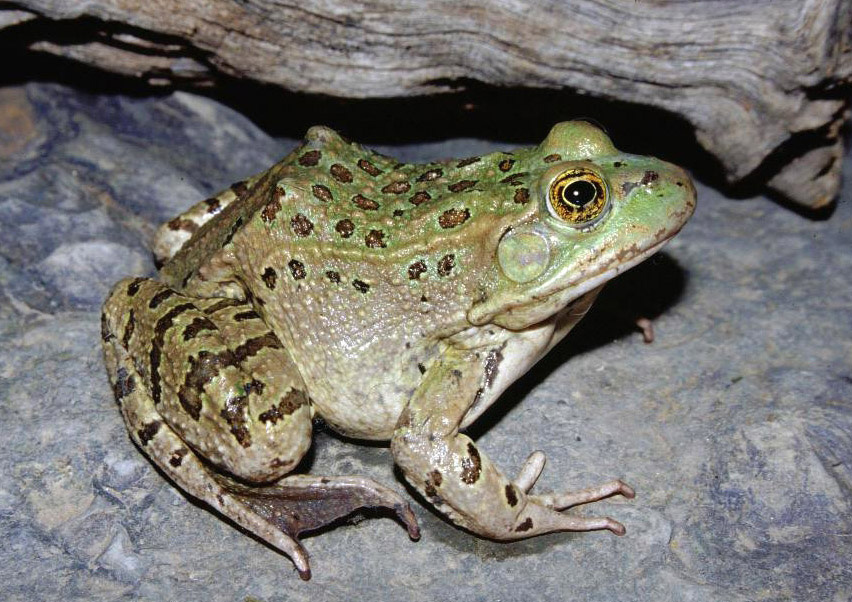

Conservation status
- Vulnerable (IUCN 3.1)

- Vulnerable (NatureServe)

Scientific classification
- Kingdom: Animalia
- Phylum: Chordata
- Class: Amphibia
- Order: Anura
- Family: Ranidae
- Genus: Lithobates
- Species: L. chiricahuensis

Binomial name
- Lithobates chiricahuensis Platz & Mecham, 1979

Synonyms
- Rana chiricahuensis; Lithobates fisheri; Lithobates subaquavocalis Platz, 1993

= Chiricahua leopard frog =

Species of amphibian

The Chiricahua leopard frog (Lithobates chiricahuensis syn. Rana chiricahuensis) is a species of frog in the family Ranidae, the true frogs.

== Distribution and habitat ==
It is native to Mexico and the United States (Arizona and New Mexico). The common name, as well as the specific name chiricahuensis, refers to the Chiricahua Mountains, AZ in which the species was first discovered. Its natural habitats are temperate forests, rivers, intermittent rivers, swamps, freshwater lakes, intermittent freshwater lakes, freshwater marshes, intermittent freshwater marshes, freshwater springs, ponds, and open excavations.

== Conservation ==
It is threatened by habitat loss and chytridiomycosis to such an extent that it has been eliminated from 80% of its former habitat. The Phoenix Zoo, Arizona's Department of Game and Fish, and the USFWS are trying to mitigate threats through captive breeding and reintroduction efforts.

== Phylogeny ==
A 2011 genetic analysis indicated that individuals of the northwestern Mogollon Rim population of L. chiricahuensis are indistinguishable from specimens of the extinct Vegas Valley leopard frog (Lithobates fisheri).

Lithobates subaquavocalis, also called the Ramsey Canyon leopard frog, is also conspecific with the Chiricahua leopard frog.
