= Island leopard frog =

Conservation status
- Critically Endangered (IUCN 3.1)

Scientific classification
- Kingdom: Animalia
- Phylum: Chordata
- Class: Amphibia
- Order: Anura
- Family: Ranidae
- Genus: Lithobates
- Species: L. miadis

Binomial name
- Lithobates miadis (Barbour & Loveridge, 1929)

Synonyms
- Rana miadis Barbour and Loveridge, 1929

Species of amphibian

The island leopard frog or Little Corn Island frog (Lithobates miadis, also commonly known as Rana miadis) is a species of frogs in the family Ranidae, endemic to Little Corn Island off the Caribbean coast of Nicaragua. It is locally known as rana leopardo isleña.

This species inhabits the tropical lowland rainforests of Little Corn Island. It is expected that the expanding tourist industry would lead to habitat loss to this species.
