= Maya Mountains frog =

Conservation status
- Least Concern (IUCN 3.1)

Scientific classification
- Kingdom: Animalia
- Phylum: Chordata
- Class: Amphibia
- Order: Anura
- Family: Ranidae
- Genus: Lithobates
- Species: L. juliani

Binomial name
- Lithobates juliani (Hillis & de Sa, 1988)

Species of amphibian

The Maya Mountains frog (Lithobates juliani) is a species of frog in the family Ranidae found in Belize and possibly Guatemala. Its natural habitats are subtropical or tropical moist lowland forests, moist savanna, and rivers. This anuran is found primarily in the Mayan Mountain region between 100 and 915 metres (328 and 3,002 ft) of elevation.

== Sources ==
- Hillis, D.M., and de Sá, R. (1984). Phylogeny and taxonomy of the Rana palmipes species group (Salientia: Ranidae). Herpetological Monographs 2: 1-26.
- Hillis, D.M. & Wilcox, T.P. (2005). Phylogeny of the New World true frogs (Rana). Mol. Phylogenet. Evol. 34(2): 299–314. doi:10.1016/j.ympev.2004.10.007 PDF fulltext.
- Hillis, D. M. (2007). Constraints in naming parts of the Tree of Life. Mol. Phylogenet. Evol. 42: 331–338.
- Hogan, C. Michael (2013). Belizean Pine Forests. Encyclopedia of Earth. National Council for Science and the Environment. ed. M. Mcginley.
- IUCN SSC Amphibian Specialist Group (2020). "Lithobates juliani". The IUCN Red List of Threatened Species. 2020 e.T58630A54372457. doi:10.2305/IUCN.UK.2020-3.RLTS.T58630A54372457.en.
