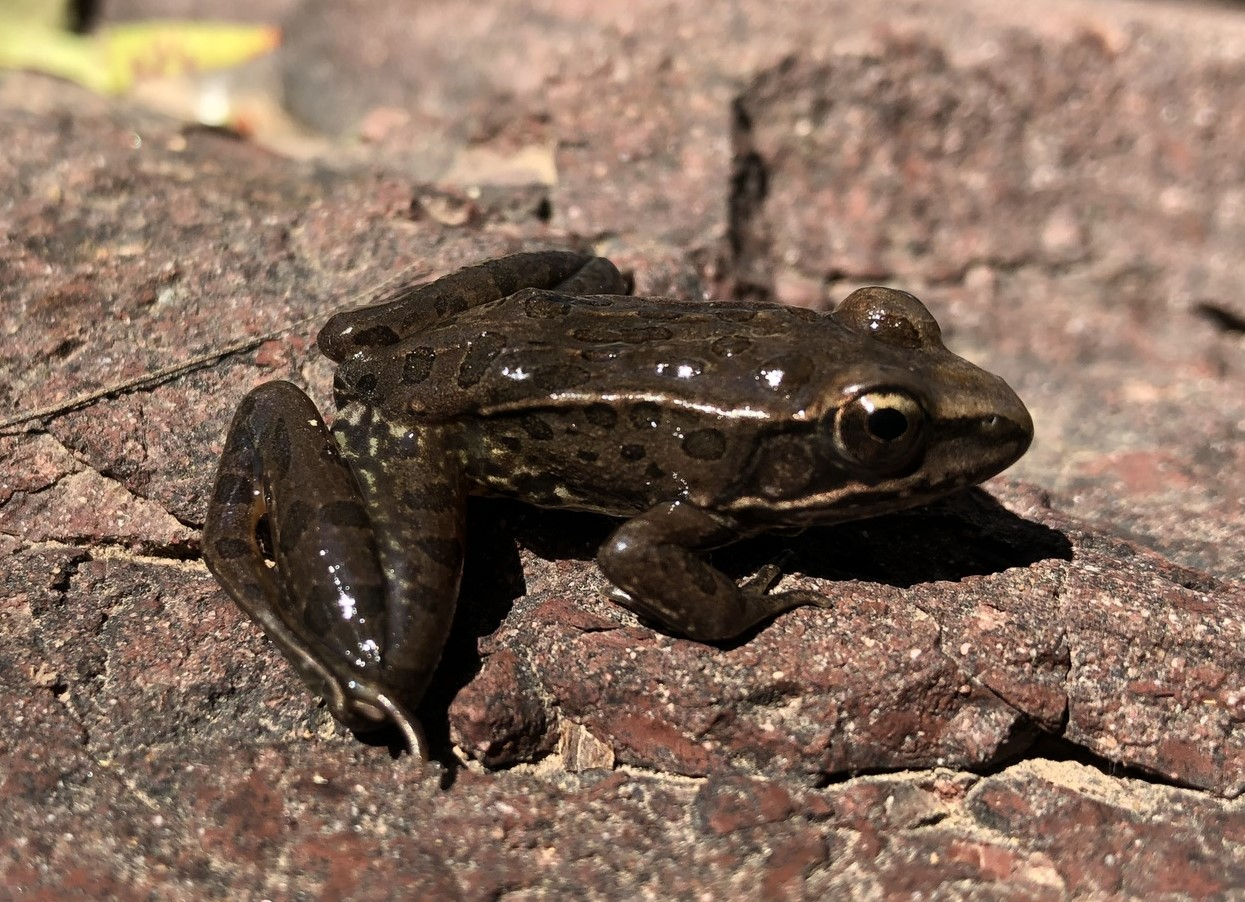

Conservation status
- Least Concern (IUCN 3.1)

Scientific classification
- Kingdom: Animalia
- Phylum: Chordata
- Class: Amphibia
- Order: Anura
- Family: Ranidae
- Genus: Lithobates
- Species: L. neovolcanicus

Binomial name
- Lithobates neovolcanicus (Hillis & Frost, 1985)

Synonyms
- Rana neovolcanica Hillis & Frost, 1985

= Transverse volcanic leopard frog =

Species of amphibian

The transverse volcanic leopard frog (Lithobates neovolcanicus) is a species of frog in the family Ranidae endemic to the southern edge of the Mexican Plateau, Mexico. Its natural habitats are pine-oak forests and mesquite grasslands near lakes, pools or slow-flowing streams. It is threatened by habitat loss.
