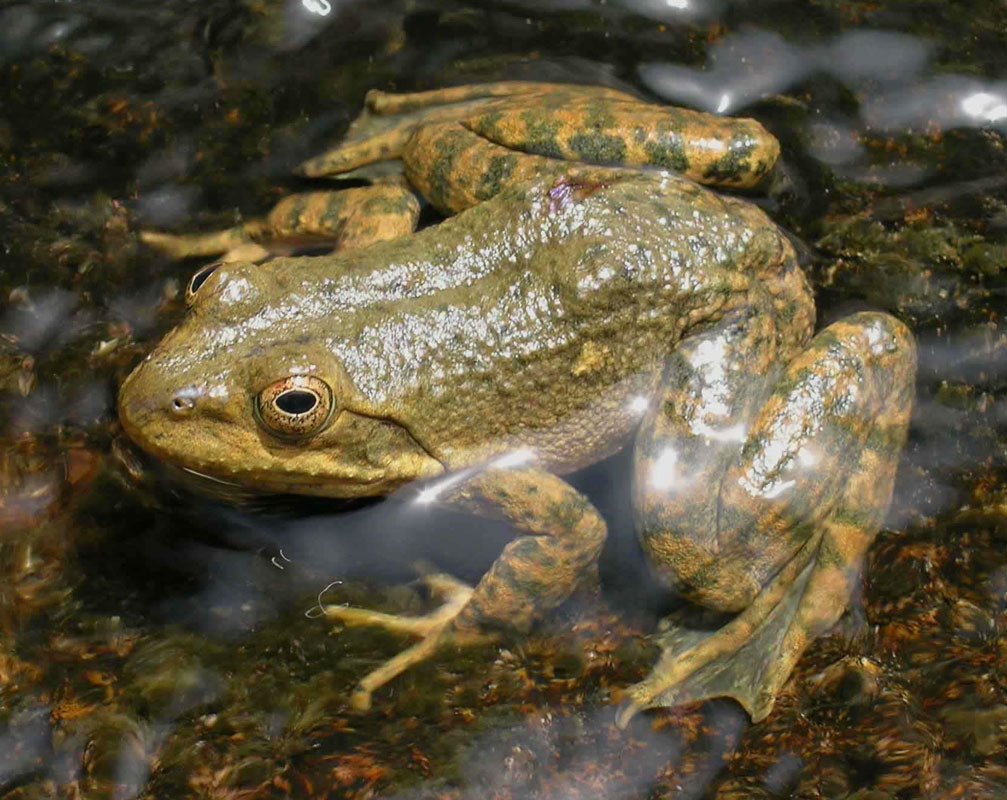

Conservation status
- Vulnerable (IUCN 3.1)

- Imperiled (NatureServe)

Scientific classification
- Kingdom: Animalia
- Phylum: Chordata
- Class: Amphibia
- Order: Anura
- Family: Ranidae
- Genus: Lithobates
- Species: L. tarahumarae

Binomial name
- Lithobates tarahumarae Boulenger, 1917

Synonyms
- Rana tarahumarae Boulenger, 1917

= Tarahumara frog =

Species of amphibian

The Tarahumara frog (Lithobates tarahumarae) is a species of frog in the family Ranidae found in Mexico and the southwestern United States, where it became regionally extinct in the early 1980s. Contributing factors include air pollution, chytridiomycosis and introduced species. Its natural habitats are streams and plunge pools in canyons in oak and pine–oak woodland, and foothill thorn scrub and tropical deciduous forest in the Pacific coast tropical area. Permanent water is necessary for reproduction.

In the early 2000s, wildlife managers reintroduced Tarahumara frogs to several of their historical locations in Arizona. This effort was largely unsuccessful due to the persistence of chytrid fungus in the environment, but refugium populations were established at chytrid-free sites outside their historical range (one at Kofa National Wildlife Refuge and another at the International Wildlife Museum).

The Tarahumara are a well-known indigenous tribe from the Copper Canyon of northern Mexico.
