= Vegas Valley leopard frog =

Conservation status
- Extinct (1942) (IUCN 3.1)

- Presumed Extinct (1942) (NatureServe)

Scientific classification
- Kingdom: Animalia
- Phylum: Chordata
- Class: Amphibia
- Order: Anura
- Family: Ranidae
- Genus: Lithobates
- Species: †L. fisheri

Binomial name
- †Lithobates fisheri (Stejneger, 1893)
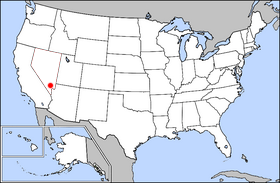
- Former range (in red)

Synonyms
- Rana fisheri Rana pipiens fisheri Rana onca fisheri Rana (Rana) fisheri Rana (Pantherana) fisheri

Species of amphibian

The Vegas Valley leopard frog (Lithobates fisheri), also known as the Las Vegas leopard frog, is an extinct species of frog. It once occurred in the Las Vegas Valley, as well as Tule Springs, Clark County, southern Nevada in the United States, at elevations between 370 and 760 m (1,210 and 2,490 ft). It was believed to be the only frog endemic to the United States to have become extinct in modern times.

== History ==
A. Vanderhorst collected 10 specimens of this species at Tule Springs on January 13, 1942. These frogs were believed to be the last recorded specimens of the Vegas Valley leopard frog and are now in the University of Michigan Museum of Comparative Zoology collection. The Vegas Valley leopard frog was considered extinct after extensive searches have failed to locate the species.

== Taxonomy ==
In 2011, a genetic analysis using mitochondrial DNA from preserved museum specimens of the Vegas Valley leopard frog revealed it forms a clade with the northwestern Mogollon Rim populations of the Chiricahua leopard frog (Lithobates chiricahuensis), which is extant but threatened. The authors argue that while it has been extirpated from the Las Vegas area, the frog is not extinct because populations formerly ascribed to the Chiricahua leopard frog actually belong to the Vegas Valley leopard frog. However, subsequent population genetic analyses using microsatellites have failed to recover the same patterns, calling into question whether these populations are ascribable to the Vegas Valley leopard frog. The 2021 revision of the IUCN Red List assessment does not recognize the northwestern Mogollon Rim populations as belonging to the Vegas Valley leopard frog and lists the species as extinct.

The close relation of the Vegas Valley leopard frog to populations of the Chiricahua leopard frog has called into question whether the two represent distinct species, and some contemporary authors treat the two as conspecific. According to nomenclatural priority, L. chiricahuensis, described in 1979, would be referable to the 1893-described L. fisheri. However, multiple authorities still refer to the two as distinct species.
