= Rio Chipillico frog =

Conservation status
- Least Concern (IUCN 3.1)

Scientific classification
- Kingdom: Animalia
- Phylum: Chordata
- Class: Amphibia
- Order: Anura
- Family: Ranidae
- Genus: Lithobates
- Species: L. bwana

Binomial name
- Lithobates bwana (Hillis & de Sa, 1988)

Synonyms
- Rana bwana Hillis and de Sá, 1988

Species of amphibian

The Rio Chipillico frog (Lithobates bwana) is a species of frog in the family Ranidae, found in Ecuador and Peru. Its natural habitats are tropical forests near fast-flowing rivers; it breeds in pools of water near rivers. It is threatened by habitat loss caused by agricultural expansion and human settlement.
