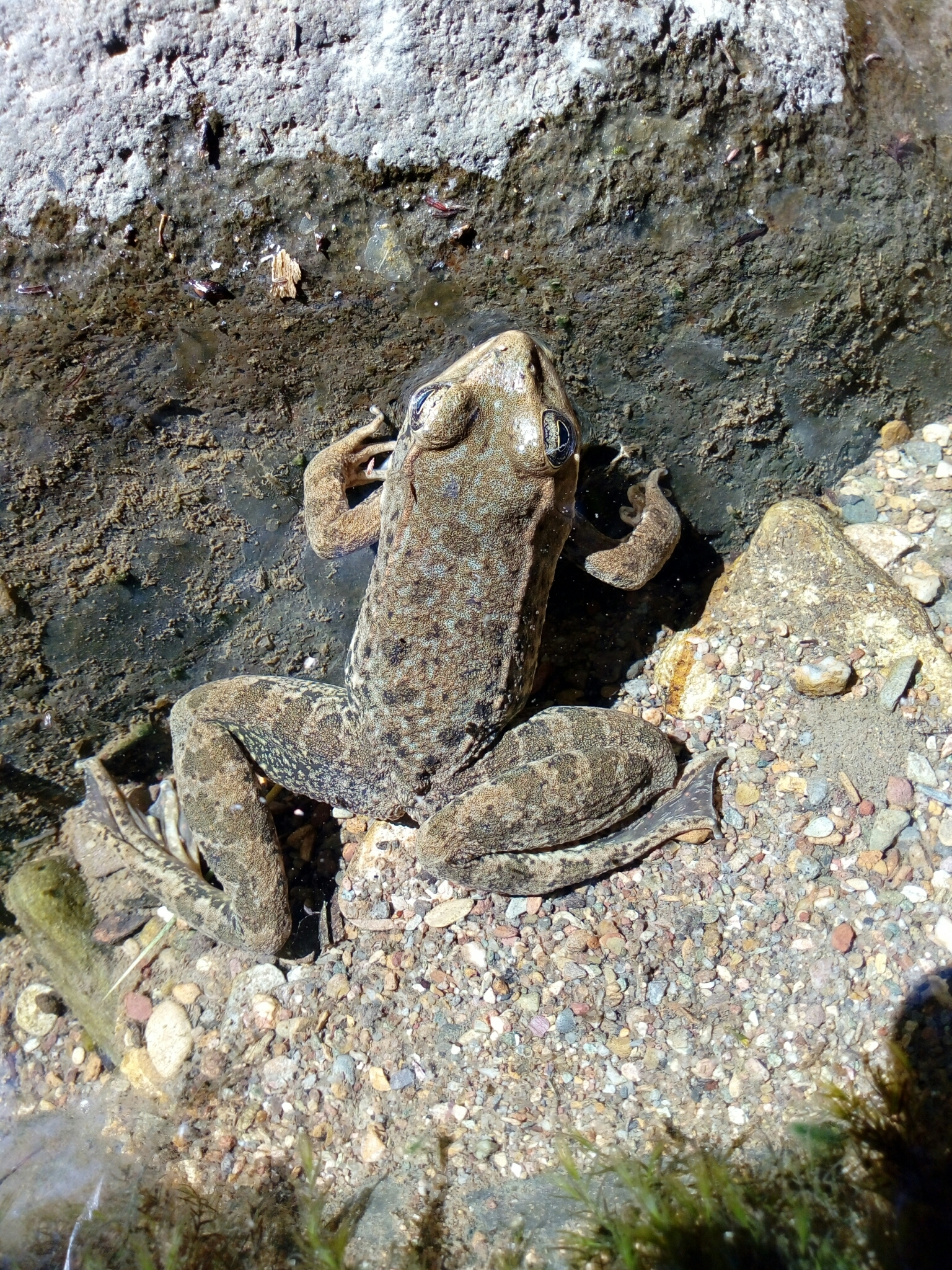

Conservation status
- Least Concern (IUCN 3.1)

Scientific classification
- Kingdom: Animalia
- Phylum: Chordata
- Class: Amphibia
- Order: Anura
- Family: Ranidae
- Genus: Lithobates
- Species: L. zweifeli

Binomial name
- Lithobates zweifeli (Hillis, J. Frost & Webb, 1984)

Synonyms
- Rana zweifeli Hillis, J. Frost & Webb, 1984

= Zweifel's frog =

Species of amphibian

Zweifel's frog (Lithobates zweifeli) is an amphibian species endemic in the family Ranidae, endemic to Mexico. It was described in 1984 and is primarily found in tropical seasonal forests at low elevations.

== Etymology ==
The specific name, zweifeli, honors American herpetologist Richard G. Zweifel.

== Habitat ==
Lithobates zweifeli inhabits tropical and subtropical forests at low elevations across southern Mexico, including the Balsas Depression and surrounding states such as Guerrero, Morelos, Michoacán, Puebla, México, Oaxaca, Jalisco, and Colima. It is typically found near permanent and temporary water bodies including streams, rivers, and ponds, which serve as breeding habitats.

== Conservation status ==
The species is currently listed as Least Concern by the IUCN Red List. However, local threats remain, particularly from habitat disturbance and the drying of aquatic systems necessary for breeding

== Taxonomy and Distribution ==
Lithobates zweifeli was formally described by Hillis, Frost, and Webb in 1984. The holotype locality is 12 km east of Teloloapan, Guerrero, Mexico. Its distribution is restricted to Mexico and it is regarded as endemic to the region.
