= Lithobates vibicarius =

Conservation status
- Endangered (IUCN 3.1)

Scientific classification
- Kingdom: Animalia
- Phylum: Chordata
- Class: Amphibia
- Order: Anura
- Family: Ranidae
- Genus: Lithobates
- Species: L. vibicarius

Binomial name
- Lithobates vibicarius (Cope, 1894)

Synonyms
- Rana vibicaria Cope, 1894; Rana godmani Günther, 1900

Species of amphibian

Lithobates vibicarius, commonly known as either green-eyed frog (after its green eyes) or Rancho Redondo frog (after its type locality in Costa Rica), is a species of frog in the family Ranidae from highland rainforests in Costa Rica and western Panama.

== Description ==
Lithobates vibicarius are relatively large frogs, 6–9 cm (2.4–3.5 in) in snout–vent length. Dorsal colouration is variable: golden, greenish, or dull brown; juveniles are usually green. There are at least some darker markings on the dorsum of most individuals. The dorsolateral folds typically have black linings on the outer edges. A black face mask is typical. The upper lip has white lining. The iris is green. Feet are extensively webbed.

== Reproduction ==
Breeding may occur throughout the year but is concentrated to the early parts of the rainy season. Calling and mating take place at night. Males generally call from vegetation in water. The call is a low, harsh trill. Eggs are laid in large, round gelatinous masses in shallow bodies of water, attached to the vegetation.

== Habitat and conservation ==
Lithobates vibicarius is a semi-aquatic frog found in lower montane and lower portions of montane rainforest. They prefer dense woods, but may also be found near water in clearings or pastures.

Lithobates vibicarius was once very common in Costa Rica, but has almost disappeared; only three populations are known at present. Surveys in Panama have failed to find the species. This decline is believed to be mainly due to the disease chytridiomycosis, although habitat loss and agricultural chemicals may also have played a role. The IUCN now lists it as endangered.
