= Lago de las Minas frog =

Conservation status
- Critically Endangered (IUCN 3.1)

Scientific classification
- Kingdom: Animalia
- Phylum: Chordata
- Class: Amphibia
- Order: Anura
- Family: Ranidae
- Genus: Lithobates
- Species: L. chichicuahutla

Binomial name
- Lithobates chichicuahutla (Cuellar, Méndez-De La Cruz & Villagrán-Santa Cruz, 1996)

Synonyms
- Rana chichicuahutla Cuellar, Méndez-De La Cruz & Villagrán-Santa Cruz, 1996

Species of amphibian

The Lago de las Minas frog (Lithobates chichicuahutla) is a species of frog in the family Ranidae. It is endemic to the Las Minas Lake (Lago de las Minas) in the Oriental Basin of Puebla, Mexico. Its natural habitat is vegetation surrounding the lake. It is threatened by deterioration in the quality of habitat surrounding the lake as well as the decline in lake surface level caused by groundwater extraction.
