= Smooth-backed frog =

Conservation status
- Least Concern (IUCN 3.1)

Scientific classification
- Kingdom: Animalia
- Phylum: Chordata
- Class: Amphibia
- Order: Anura
- Family: Ranidae
- Genus: Lithobates
- Species: L. psilonota

Binomial name
- Lithobates psilonota Frost, 2006

Synonyms
- Rana psilonota, Webb, 2001

Species of amphibian

The smooth-backed frog (Lithobates psilonota) is a species of frog in the family Ranidae endemic to Mexico.

This species is native to western Mexico, including southern Zacatecas, northern Aguascalientes, and southern Nayarit, and south to western Jalisco and northwestern Colima. It inhabits the basins of the Ameca, Armeria, and Grande de Santiago rivers, between 350 and 2,400 meters elevation.

Its natural habitats are temperate forests, subtropical or tropical moist montane forests, and rivers.

It is threatened by habitat loss.

== Sources ==
- Hillis, D. M., J. S. Frost, and R. G. Webb. (1984) A new species of frog of the Rana tarahumarae group from southwestern Mexico. Copeia '1984: 398–403.
- Hillis, D.M. & Wilcox, T.P. (2005): Phylogeny of the New World true frogs (Rana). Mol. Phylogenet. Evol. 34(2): 299–314. doi:10.1016/j.ympev.2004.10.007 PDF fulltext.
