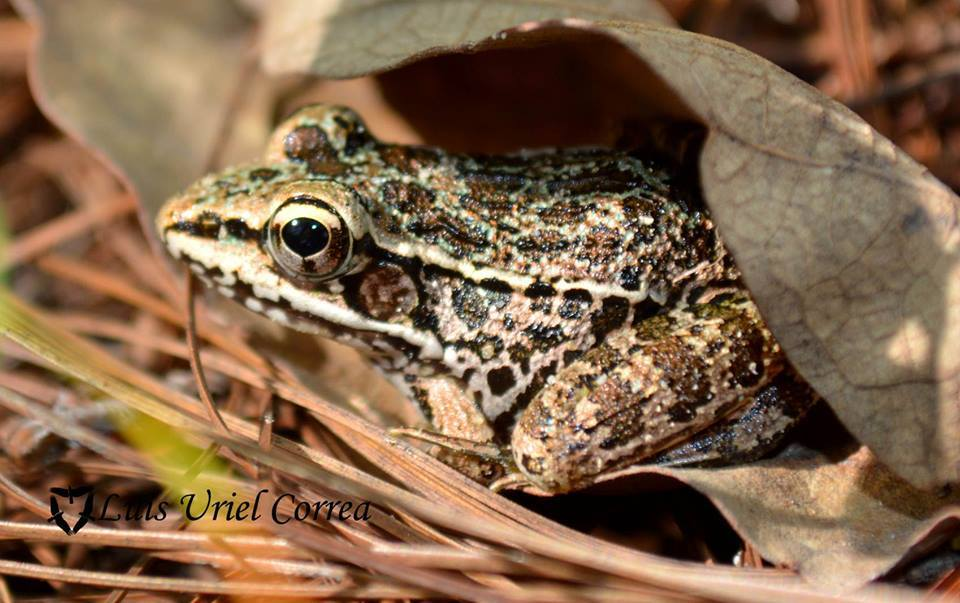

Conservation status
- Endangered (IUCN 3.1)

Scientific classification
- Kingdom: Animalia
- Phylum: Chordata
- Class: Amphibia
- Order: Anura
- Family: Ranidae
- Genus: Lithobates
- Species: L. omiltemanus

Binomial name
- Lithobates omiltemanus Günther, 1900

Synonyms
- Rana omiltemana Günther, 1900

= Guerreran leopard frog =

Species of amphibian

The Guerreran leopard frog (Lithobates omiltemanus) is a species of frog in the family Ranidae endemic to the Sierra Madre del Sur in Guerrero, Mexico.

Guerreran leopard frog inhabits montane forests at around 2,400 m (7,900 ft) elevation. It breeds in streams.
