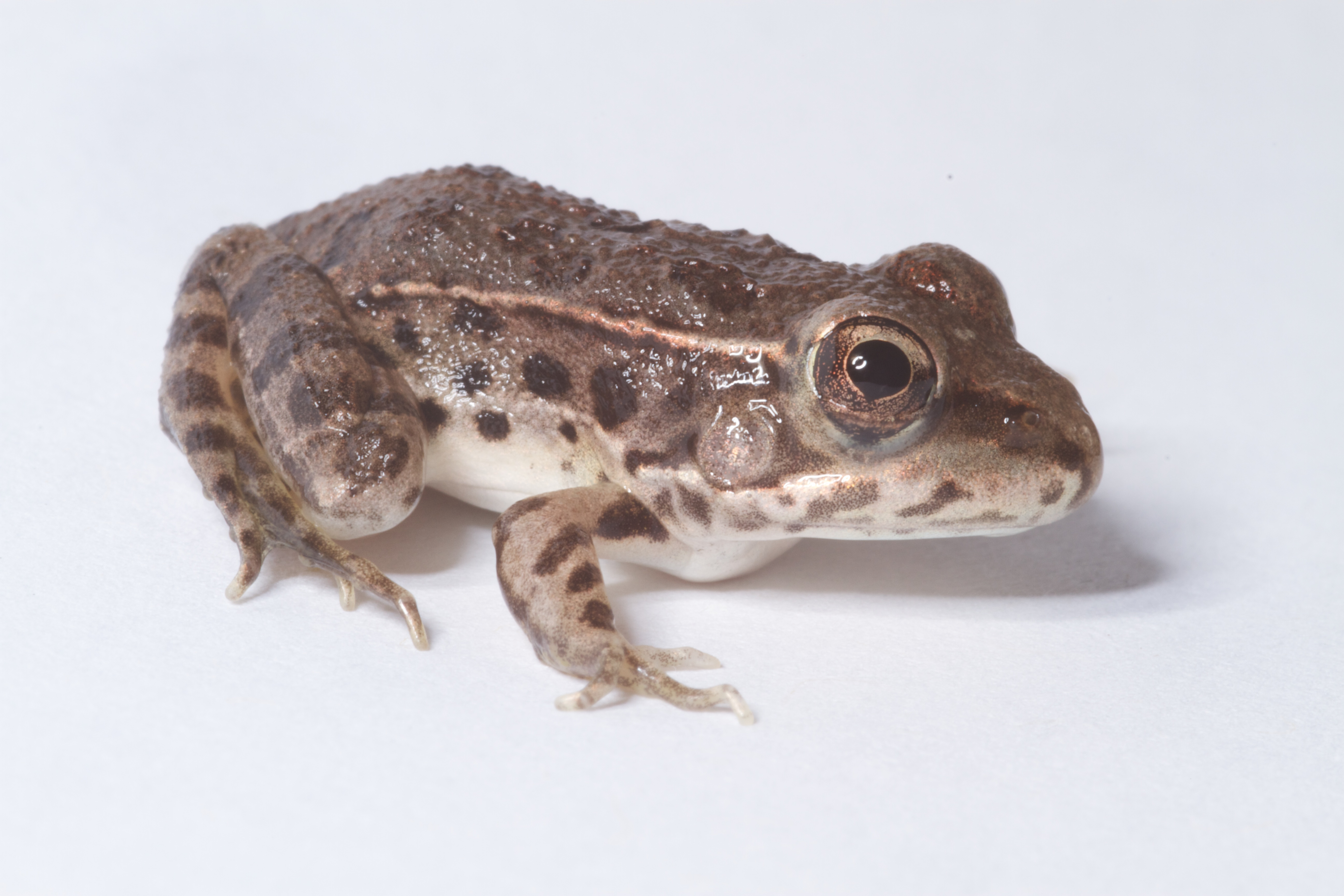

Conservation status
- Least Concern (IUCN 3.1)

- Apparently Secure (NatureServe)

Scientific classification
- Kingdom: Animalia
- Phylum: Chordata
- Class: Amphibia
- Order: Anura
- Family: Ranidae
- Genus: Lithobates
- Species: L. yavapaiensis

Binomial name
- Lithobates yavapaiensis (Platz & Frost, 1984)

Synonyms
- Rana yavapaiensis Platz & Frost, 1984

= Lowland leopard frog =

Species of amphibian

The lowland leopard frog (Lithobates yavapaiensis) is a species of frog in the family Ranidae that is found in Mexico and the United States.

Its natural habitats are temperate forests, rivers, intermittent rivers, freshwater lakes, and freshwater marshes. It is not considered threatened by the IUCN.

Larvae of lowland leopard frogs are herbivorous. The diet of adults is unknown, but they may be opportunistic insectivores, eating aquatic invertebrates and some vertebrates when available. Predators of tadpoles include insects, fish, great blue herons, Sonora mud turtles, tiger salamanders, and garter snakes. Adults are prey of black hawks, ringtail cats, cougars, bobcats, raccoons, American badgers, skunks, gray foxes, coyotes, and American black bears.
