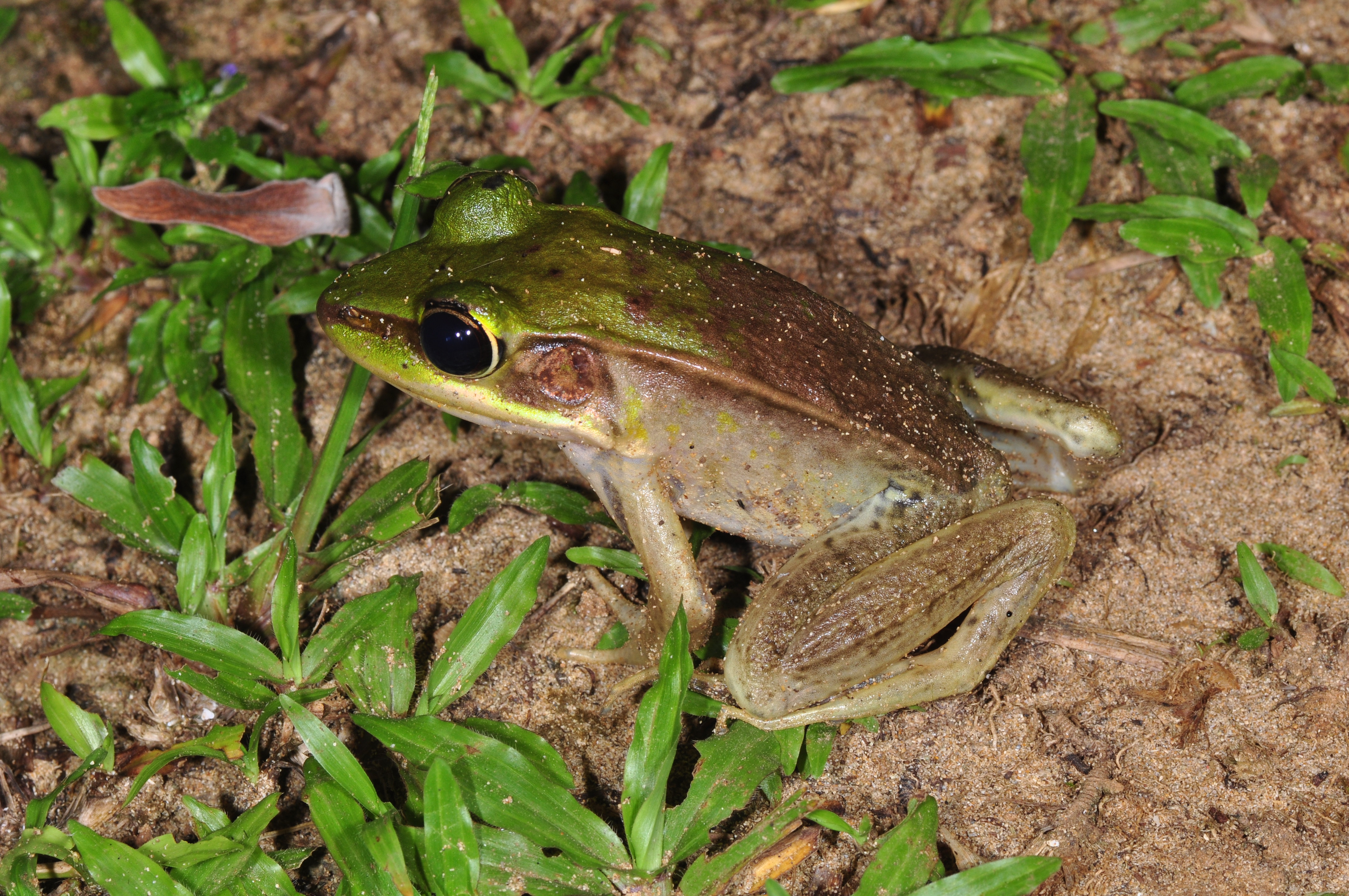

Conservation status
- Least Concern (IUCN 3.1)

Scientific classification
- Kingdom: Animalia
- Phylum: Chordata
- Class: Amphibia
- Order: Anura
- Family: Ranidae
- Genus: Lithobates
- Species: L. vaillanti

Binomial name
- Lithobates vaillanti (Brocchi, 1877)

Synonyms
- Rana bonaccana Günther, 1900; Rana vaillanti Brocchi, 1877

= Vaillant's frog =

Species of amphibian

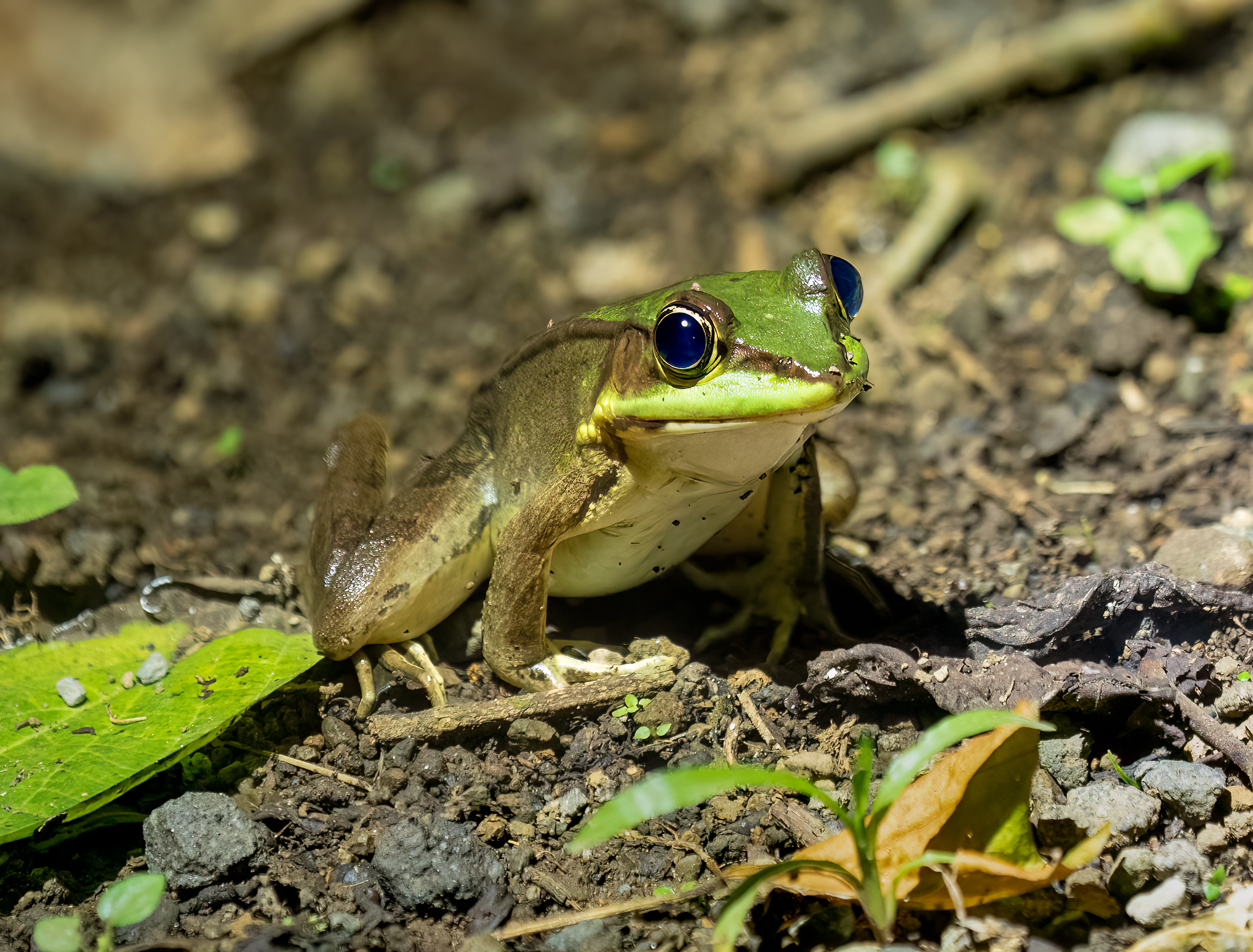
Vaillant's frog in Costa Rica

Vaillant's frog (Lithobates vaillanti) is a species of frog in the family Ranidae found in Central America. Its natural habitats are subtropical or tropical dry forests, subtropical or tropical moist lowland forests, subtropical or tropical swamps, rivers, swamps, freshwater lakes, intermittent freshwater lakes, freshwater marshes, intermittent freshwater marshes, rural gardens, heavily degraded former forests, water storage areas, ponds, and canals and ditches.
