= Sierra Madre frog =

Conservation status
- Least Concern (IUCN 3.1)

Scientific classification
- Kingdom: Animalia
- Phylum: Chordata
- Class: Amphibia
- Order: Anura
- Family: Ranidae
- Genus: Lithobates
- Species: L. sierramadrensis

Binomial name
- Lithobates sierramadrensis (Taylor, 1939)

Synonyms
- Rana sierramadrensis Taylor, 1939

Species of amphibian

The Sierra Madre frog (Lithobates sierramadrensis) is a species of frog in the family Ranidae endemic to the Sierra Madre del Sur in Guerrero and Oaxaca states, Mexico. Its local name is rana de Sierra Madre Occidental. Its natural habitats are conifer forests at intermediate elevations. Breeding takes place in streams. It is threatened by habitat loss (logging) and possibly chytridiomycosis.
