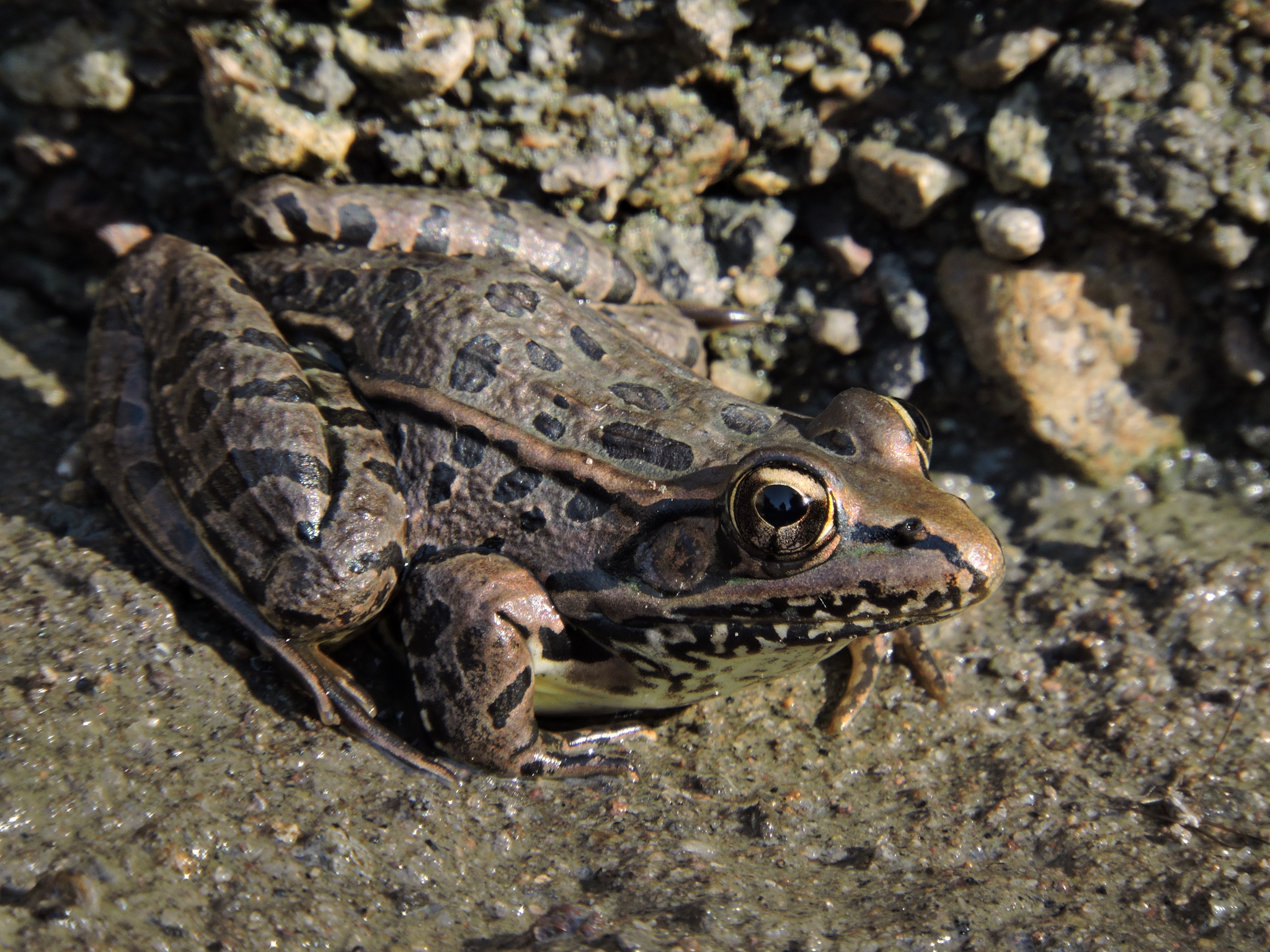

Conservation status
- Least Concern (IUCN 3.1)

Scientific classification
- Kingdom: Animalia
- Phylum: Chordata
- Class: Amphibia
- Order: Anura
- Family: Ranidae
- Genus: Lithobates
- Species: L. spectabilis

Binomial name
- Lithobates spectabilis (Hillis & Frost, 1985)

Synonyms
- Rana spectabilis Hillis & Frost, 1985

= Showy leopard frog =

Species of amphibian

The showy leopard frog (Lithobates spectabilis) is a species of frog in the family Ranidae endemic to Mexico.

Its natural habitats are subtropical or tropical moist montane forests, freshwater lakes, and water storage areas. It is threatened by habitat loss.
