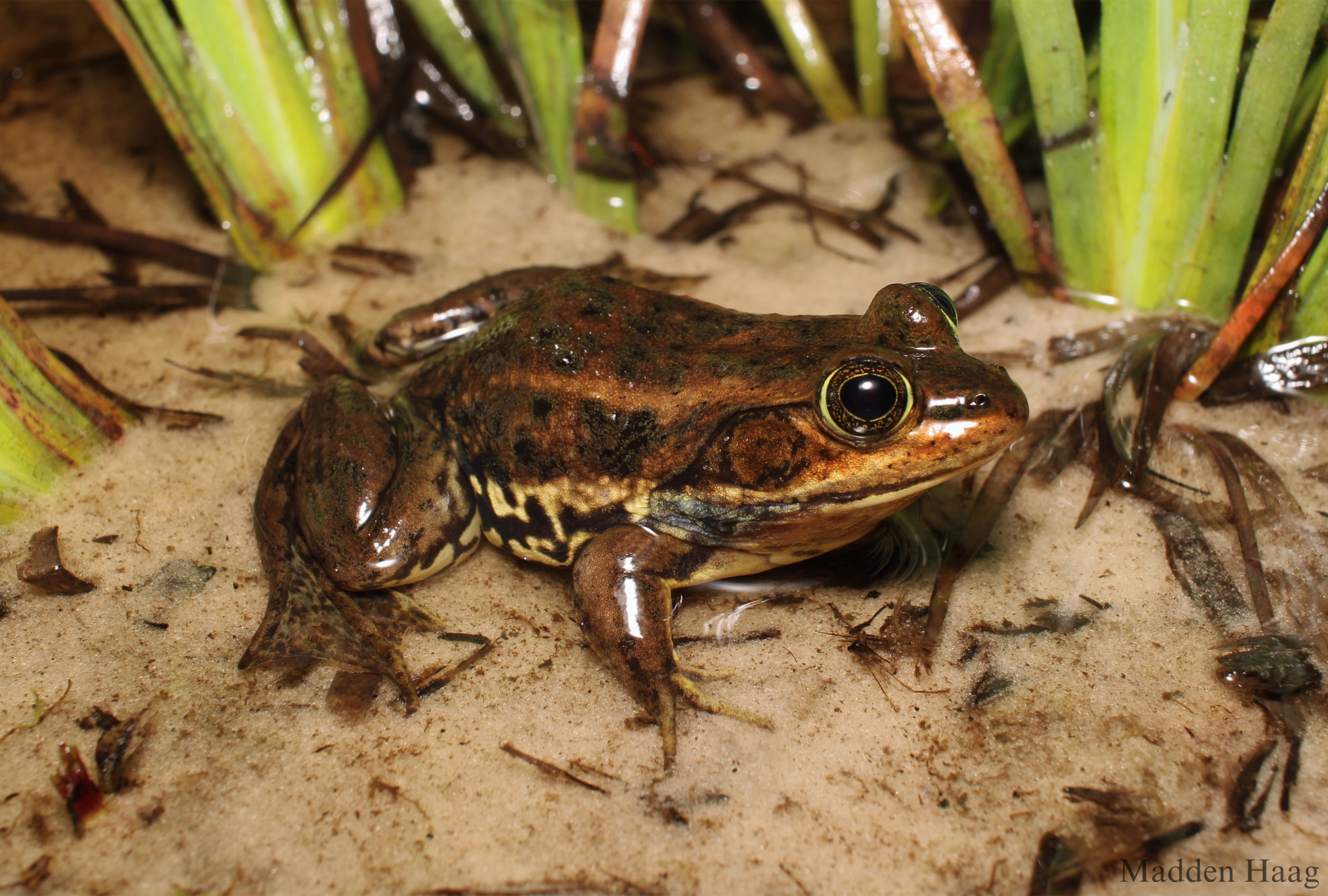
- This frog was found in northern Florida.

Conservation status
- Least Concern (IUCN 3.1)

- Apparently Secure (NatureServe)

Scientific classification
- Kingdom: Animalia
- Phylum: Chordata
- Class: Amphibia
- Order: Anura
- Family: Ranidae
- Genus: Lithobates
- Species: L. virgatipes

Binomial name
- Lithobates virgatipes (Cope, 1891)

Synonyms
- Rana virgatipes Cope, 1891

= Carpenter frog =

Species of amphibian

The carpenter frog (Lithobates virgatipes) is a species of true frog found on coastal plain of the Atlantic coast of the United States between central New Jersey and northeastern Florida.

== Identification ==
Carpenter frogs are distinguished by their all brown color with two yellow stripes on each side of the back. Their tail is gray in color and their underside is normally white or yellow. Unlike other frogs the webbing on their toes does not reach the longest toe. Carpenter frogs are recognized by their call which resembles a carpenter hammering, which gives them their name. They have ectothermic, heterothermic and bilateral symmetry. The frog's throat pouch is spherical shaped when inflated. Full grown frogs are medium-sized 4.1-6.6 centimeters.

== Habitat ==
The carpenter frog is found in the Atlantic coastal plains in the United States. From the pine barrens of New Jersey to the bottom of Georgia, the carpenter frog makes its home. The frog is also found, but not common, in Florida. They are usually found in water and rarely on land. The carpenter frog adapted to be able to live in acidic waters. The frog has been observed in cypress ponds, interdunal swales, tupelo swamps, acid swamps, canals, and is associated with sphagnum mats and other vegetation in coffee-colored waters of pine savanna bogs or ponds. They most commonly are found in relatively acidic water abundant Sphagnum or other vegetation leading to being sometimes referred to "sphagnum frogs." They depend on aquatic vegetation in shallow waters for protection and breeding. It is said that carpenter frogs are found in waterways that are tea or coffee colored, where they can easily be camouflaged.

== Reproduction ==
Carpenter frogs are prolonged breeders with a breeding season between 2–3 months. The breeding season typically occurs with onset of warm weather in late April and continues until late July or early August. Males maintain territories with a median radius of 1 meter and produce mating calls on most nights of the breeding season. Intensity of the calls varies according to body size, with smaller males having high pitched calls of lower intensity relative to larger males. Their calls resemble the sound of a carpenter hammer, which is the origin of their common name. They exhibit five different call types with each one being reserved for a different social interaction. Calling activity occurs between sunset and sunrise but peaks near midnight. After mating, females lay globular egg masses of 200-600 eggs attached to underwater vegetation up to 8 inches deep.

== Life cycle ==
Tadpoles hatch from eggs approximately one week after laying, and remain in this state for approximately 1 year. Between August and September, tadpoles will metamorphose into juvenile frogs.

== Diet ==
Carpenter frogs eat a majority of aquatic insects and invertebrates such as small crickets, bug larva, and spiders.

== Threats ==
One of the main reasons that the carpenter frog has become of special concern is due to its susceptibility to habitat loss and degradation. In the 1990s the carpenter frog population in Talbot County was found to be severely decreased as a possible result of habitat degradation. (Given, 1999; White and White, 2002) In South Georgia the Carpenter Frog is considered a common species although it has a limited range. Considering that the Carpenter Frog requires wetland areas with large amounts of submerged vegetation for breeding, human disturbances, such as ditching and urbanization, to such environments have and will continue to impact the species. ("Conservation Plans for Biotic Regions in Florida Containing Multiple Rare or Declining Wildlife Taxa", 2003)

Because it is known to thrive in acidic waters, throughout time the neutralization of water, specifically in the Delmarva region, has had a great impact on its decline in population because they are unable to adapt. As wetlands become less acidic, it becomes a new habitat for a larger variety of frogs and other species that can thrive in these conditions. It is suggested that predation also plays a role in the decline of their population. These larger frogs include more aggressive species such as northern green frogs which can potentially be a great threat to the carpenter frog. The presence of American Bullfrogs (Lithobates catesbeianus) and Pig Frogs (Lithobates grylio) have also negatively affected the species. Apart from other frogs becoming a threat to the carpenter frog, some research suggests that water snakes (Nerodia) also prey on the carpenter frog.
