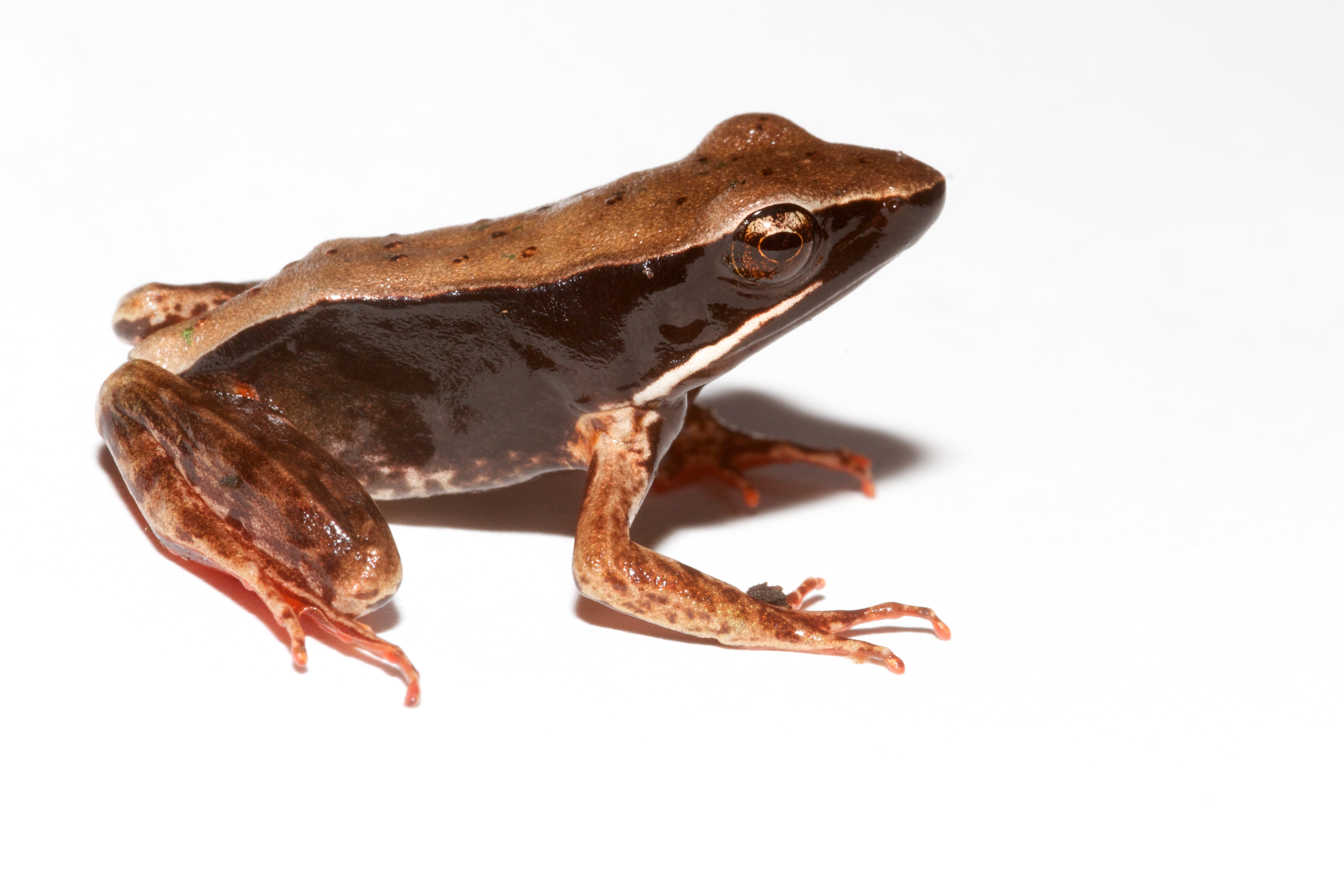

Conservation status
- Least Concern (IUCN 3.1)

Scientific classification
- Kingdom: Animalia
- Phylum: Chordata
- Class: Amphibia
- Order: Anura
- Family: Ranidae
- Genus: Lithobates
- Species: L. warszewitschii

Binomial name
- Lithobates warszewitschii (Schmidt, 1857)

Synonyms
- Rana warszewitschii Schmidt, 1857; Rana coeruleopunctata Steindachner, 1864; Ranula chrysoprasina Cope, 1866

= Warszewitsch's frog =

Species of amphibian

Warszewitsch's frog (Lithobates warszewitschii) is a species of frog in the family Ranidae found in Honduras, Nicaragua, Costa Rica, and Panama.

== Description ==
L. warszewitschii is medium-sized: males grow to 52 mm (2.0 in) and females to 63 mm (2.5 in) in snout–vent length. The snout is pointed. They have large or small green patches on a golden brown background on their backs; the colouration darkens to brown along the sides. The dark area extends forward onto the face to form a "mask". They also have a light lip line. The dorsolateral folds have lighter colouration, usually golden or yellow. The feet are extensively webbed.

== Habitat and conservation ==
Its natural habitats are humid lowland, montane, and gallery forests, where it is found near streams, but it can also be found far from streams. It can survive even in small forest patches. Some populations seem to have suffered from chytridiomycosis, but more recently recovered. It is also affected by habitat loss.
