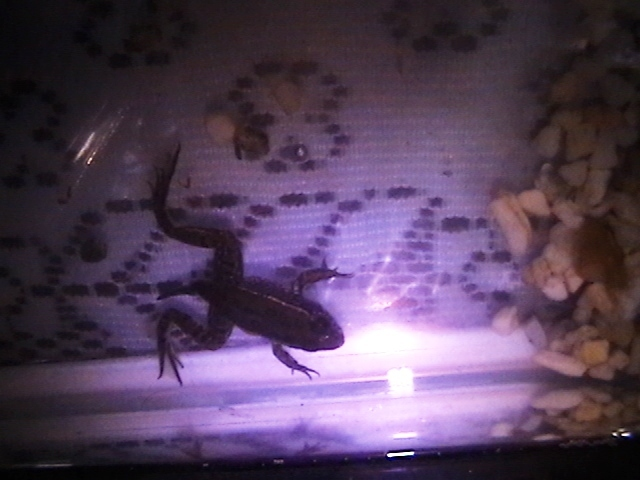

Conservation status
- Critically endangered, possibly extinct (IUCN 3.1)

Scientific classification
- Kingdom: Animalia
- Phylum: Chordata
- Class: Amphibia
- Order: Anura
- Family: Ranidae
- Genus: Lithobates
- Species: L. tlaloci

Binomial name
- Lithobates tlaloci (Hillis & Frost, 1985)

Synonyms
- Rana tlaloci Hillis & Frost, 1985

= Tlaloc's leopard frog =

Species of amphibian

Tlaloc's leopard frog (Lithobates tlaloci), or rana de Tláloc in Spanish, is a species of frog in the family Ranidae endemic to the Valley of Mexico. It is critically endangered.

Tlaloc's leopard frog inhabits wetland areas in the surroundings of southern Mexico City. Its habitat has disappeared because of rapid urbanization.
