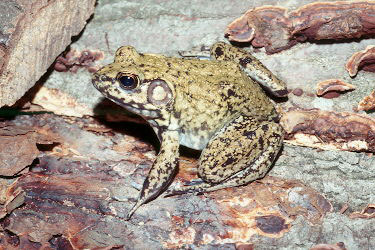

Conservation status
- Least Concern (IUCN 3.1)

- Secure (NatureServe)

Scientific classification
- Kingdom: Animalia
- Phylum: Chordata
- Class: Amphibia
- Order: Anura
- Family: Ranidae
- Genus: Lithobates
- Species: L. heckscheri

Binomial name
- Lithobates heckscheri (Wright, 1924)

Synonyms
- Rana heckscheri Wright, 1924

= Lithobates heckscheri =

River frog

Species of amphibian

The river frog (Lithobates heckscheri) is a species of aquatic frog in the family Ranidae. It is endemic to the southeastern United States. Its natural habitats are temperate rivers, swamps, freshwater lakes and freshwater marshes. It is threatened by habitat loss.

== Taxonomy ==
Historically, the river frog has been known as Rana heckscheri but was placed in the genus Lithobates by Frost et al., 2006, this being a separate genus of ranid frogs that included most of the North American frogs traditionally included in the genus Rana. This change has proved controversial, and some authorities treat Lithobates as a subgenus of Rana, with the river frog's scientific name being written Rana (Lithobates) heckscheri.

== Description ==
The river frog is a very large species with adults commonly between 7 and 13 cm (3 and 5 in) in length. The skin is rough and wrinkled but there are no dorso-lateral ridges as there are in the green frog (Lithobates clamitans). The back is some shade of dark green or blackish-green and the belly is dark grey, or blackish with pale wavy lines and specks. A distinctive characteristic is white spots on the lips, particularly on the lower lip, and this helps to distinguish this species from bullfrogs (Rana catesbeiana) and pig frogs (Rana grylio). Another distinguishing feature is a pale band outlining the groin. Males have a yellowish throat and their tympani (eardrums) are larger than their eyes while those of females are smaller.

== Distribution and habitat ==
The river frog is endemic to the Atlantic and Gulf coastal plains of the southeastern United States. Its range at least formerly extended southwards from the southern part of North Carolina to southeastern Mississippi and northern Florida; it is now thought to have been extirpated from North Carolina due to habitat loss. Its typical habitat is marshes and other wet locations with emergent vegetation near streams, rivers, ponds and lakes.

== Biology ==
Adult river frogs have a home range of about 16 square metres (170 sq ft). They are largely nocturnal and feed on insects and other invertebrates, as well as small vertebrates, including frogs. They spend much of their time in water and are relatively bold. During hot weather they are normally found sitting in moist or wet places, presumably to avoid desiccation. When the temperature falls below about 17 °C (63 °F) they are no longer to be seen in their normal habitat and are likely to be seeking refuge from the cold under water.

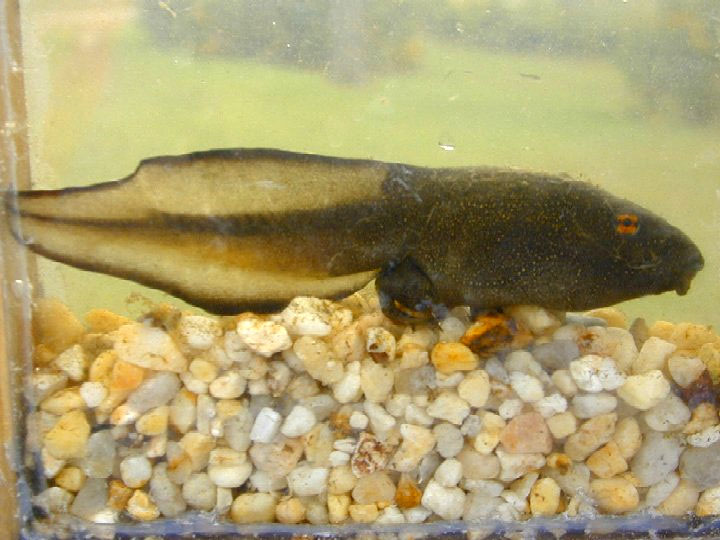
Tadpoles have red eyes and dark edges to the tail fin

Breeding takes place between April and August with males calling from the edge of ponds and swamps from April to July. The call has been described as "a deep, low-pitched, rolling snore". The eggs are laid in a floating layer among emergent vegetation, a clutch numbering several thousand eggs which hatch after about three days. The tadpoles are at first a dark color but become much paler over time with a dark edge to the tail fin. They congregate in the shallows in the daytime, sometimes in dense swarms, but move into deep water at night. They feed on both animal and vegetable matter. They remain as tadpoles for a long period, overwintering once or twice, and reaching a snout-to-vent length of 97 millimetres (3.8 in) or more. After metamorphosis, the newly emerged juveniles are 30 to 52 millimetres (1.2 to 2.0 in) long and move away from the margins of the water. The large number of juveniles compared to the relatively small number of adults indicates a high mortality rate for newly emerged young. Predators that feed on tadpoles and juveniles are thought to include the banded water snake (Nerodia fasciata), other water snakes (Nerodia sp.), the largemouth bass (Micropterus salmoides) and the grackle (Quiscalus sp.). However the skin may contain some noxious substances or malodorous secretions as some snakes, including the indigo snake (Drymarchon), have been observed gagging and retching after eating a river frog. Even after the frog has been regurgitated, the snake continued to wipe its mouth on the ground.

== Status ==
The river frog has a wide range and is quite common in much of that range. The population appears to be large and reasonably stable and the main threat the frog faces is degradation of its habitat; it has declined in portions of its range due to this, and is thought to have been extirpated from the northernmost extremity of its range in southern North Carolina by 1975. However, it is present in a number of protected areas and the IUCN considers its conservation status to be of "least concern".
