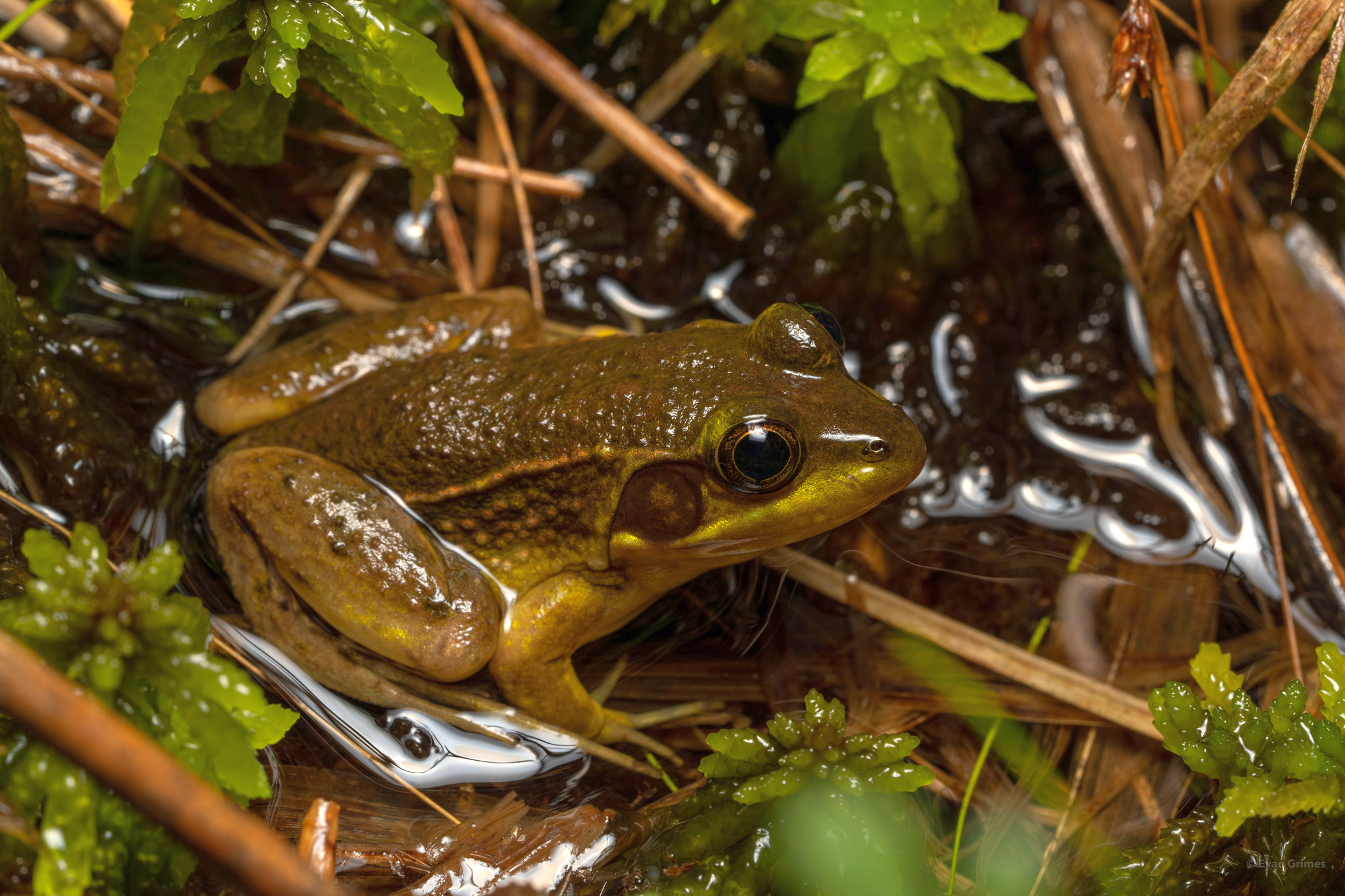
- Lithobates okaloosae has less webbing between its toes than other members of American frogs.

Conservation status
- Vulnerable (IUCN 3.1)

Scientific classification
- Kingdom: Animalia
- Phylum: Chordata
- Class: Amphibia
- Order: Anura
- Family: Ranidae
- Genus: Lithobates
- Species: L. okaloosae

Binomial name
- Lithobates okaloosae Moler, 1985

Synonyms
- Rana okaloosae

= Florida bog frog =

Species of amphibian

The Florida bog frog (Lithobates okaloosae) is a rare species of frog found only in western Florida.

== Distribution ==
The Florida bog frog inhabits a total area of less than 20 km^{2} (7.7 mi^{2}). It is found in shallow ponds or creeks along tributaries of the East Bay, Shoal and Yellow Rivers in Santa Rosa, Okaloosa, and Walton Counties in Florida. About 90% of its range lies within Eglin Air Force Base, so the major threat to this species originates from human activity disturbing their natural habitat. The base is working with Florida Fish and Wildlife to protect the bog frog, which has shown some tolerance to intrusion.

== Description ==
This species ranges from 34 to 49 mm (1.3 to 1.9 in) in snout to vent length (SVL), with females being a few millimeters larger than males on average. They have no spots on their dorsal surfaces and compared to other North American members of the genus Lithobates, the webbing between the toes is greatly reduced. They are light green. Males have a yellow throat and larger tympana. Tadpoles are brown with dark spots on the tail and light spots on the ventral surface.

The Florida bog frog differs from other American frogs by reduced webbing of their feet – "at least three phalanges of the 4th toe are free of webbing and at least two phalanges of all other toes are free".

== Habitat ==
Florida Bog Frogs occupy sluggish backwaters and seepages associated with clear, sand-bottomed streams. They prefer relatively open mucky areas that are thickly vegetated with low-lying herbaceous plant species, and are especially fond of areas dominated by sphagnum. The structure of their preferred microhabitats are maintained by the regular intrusion of fire and they will abandon habitats that become thickly overgrown with woody shrubs. Suppression of hot summer fires that enter wooded stream bottoms has led to the loss and degradation of much of the species' historic breeding habitat.

== Ecology and behavior ==
This species was unknown to science until the 1982, when it was discovered by State of Florida herpetologist Paul Moler while conducting surveys for the Pine Barrens Treefrog (Hyla andersonii). Relatively little is known about their reproduction and development. Males call at night during the summer months, often in areas where bronze frogs (Lithobates clamitans clamitans) also breed. Females lay several hundred eggs at a time on the surface of shallow, non-stagnant, acidic (pH 4.1–5.5) water during the spring and summer. Tadpoles metamorphose by the next spring.
