= Lemos-Espinal's leopard frog =

Conservation status
- Data Deficient (IUCN 3.1)

Scientific classification
- Kingdom: Animalia
- Phylum: Chordata
- Class: Amphibia
- Order: Anura
- Family: Ranidae
- Genus: Lithobates
- Species: L. lemosespinali

Binomial name
- Lithobates lemosespinali (Smith and Chiszar, 2003)

Synonyms
- Rana lemosespinali Smith and Chiszar, 2003

Species of amphibian

Lemos-Espinal's leopard frog (Lithobates lemosespinali) is a species of frog in the family Ranidae endemic to the Sierra Madre Occidental of southwestern Chihuahua in northern Mexico. Its natural habitats are pine-oak forests. It is threatened by habitat loss.
