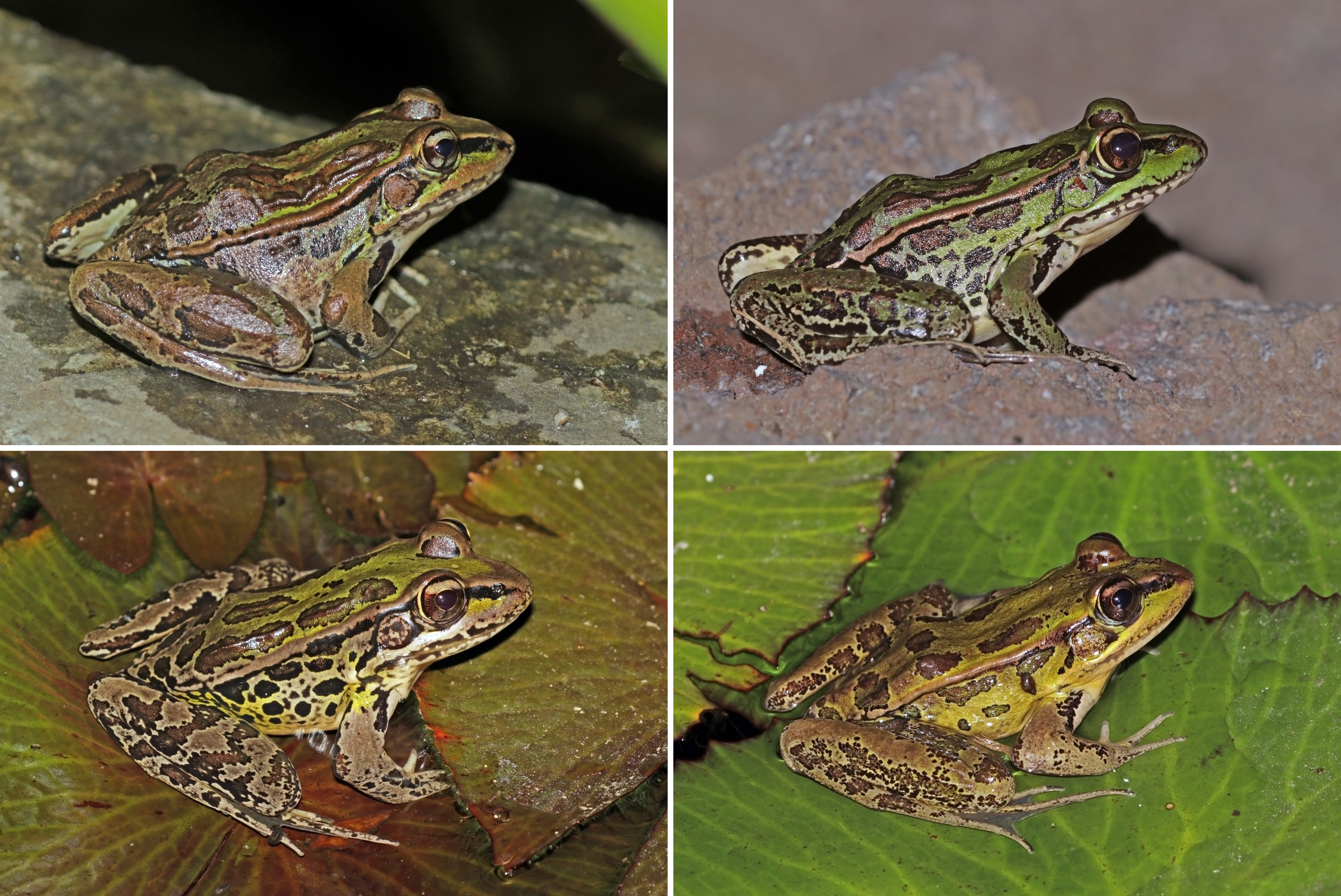
- four animals from one garden in Costa Rica

Conservation status
- Least Concern (IUCN 3.1)

Scientific classification
- Kingdom: Animalia
- Phylum: Chordata
- Class: Amphibia
- Order: Anura
- Family: Ranidae
- Genus: Lithobates
- Species: L. taylori

Binomial name
- Lithobates taylori (Smith, 1959)

Synonyms
- Rana taylori Smith, 1959

= Peralta frog =

Species of amphibian

The Peralta frog, or montane leopard frog, Lithobates taylori, is a species of frog in the family Ranidae found in Costa Rica and Nicaragua.

== Etymology ==
The specific name taylori honors Edward Harrison Taylor (1889–1978), an American herpetologist.

== Description ==
Peralta frogs are relatively large frogs, 6–8.5 cm (2.4–3.3 in) in snout–vent length. Colouration of dorsum is tan, green, or gray, often with large elongated black spots with clear edges. The dorsolateral folds are clear but become discontinuous towards the back. Belly is white. Feet are extensively webbed.

== Habitat and conservation ==
Peralta frog is a nocturnal, semi-aquatic frog inhabiting ponds, swamps, and marshes in lowland wet forest, premontane moist and wet forests, and rainforest. Breeding takes place during the wet season. The eggs are attached to aquatic vegetation. The tadpoles develop in these wetlands. It may be threatened by habitat loss due to deforestation, possibly by also water pollution from agricultural pesticides.
