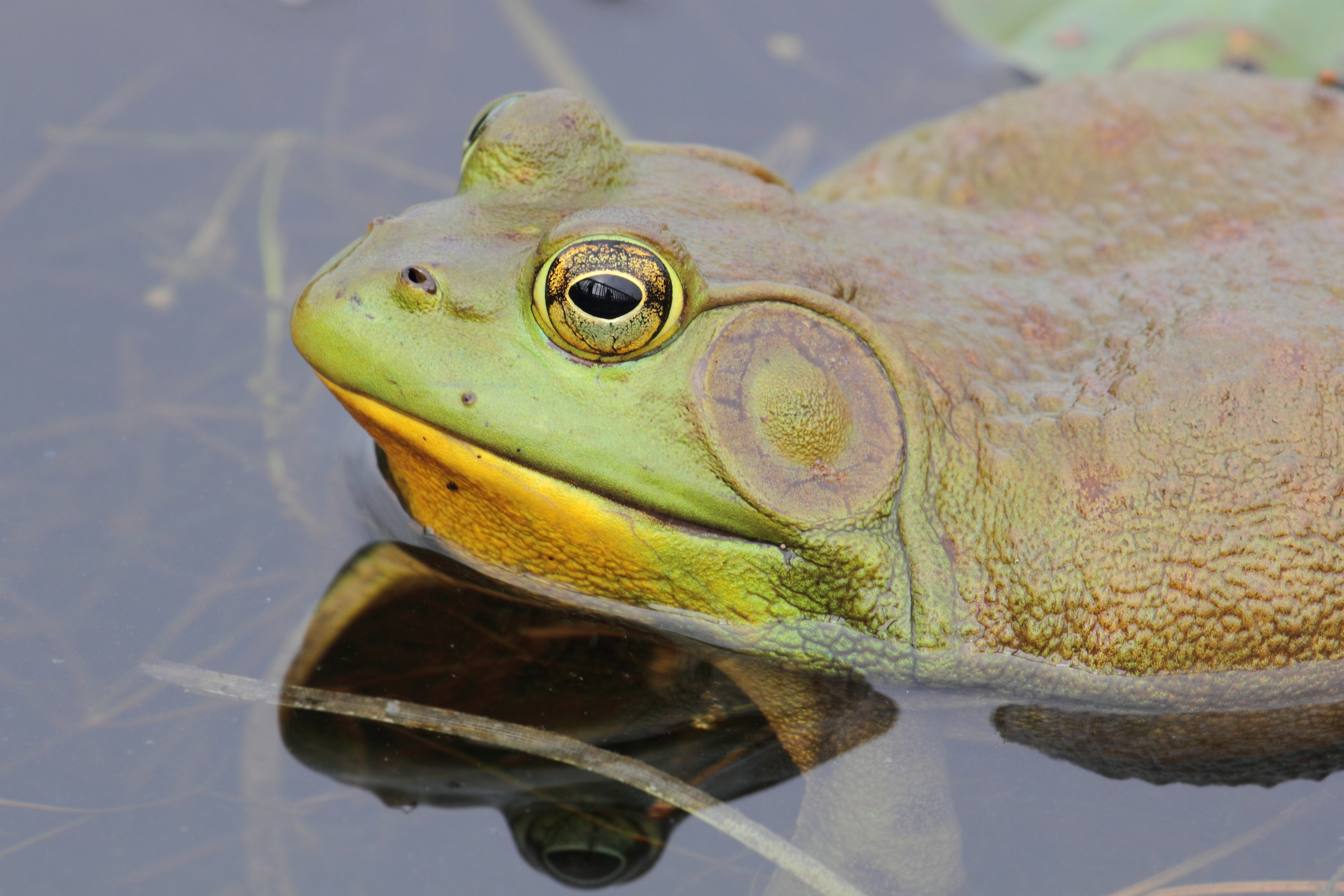
- A close up of a male American bullfrog (Lithobates catesbeianus)

Scientific classification
- Kingdom: Animalia
- Phylum: Chordata
- Class: Amphibia
- Order: Anura
- Family: Ranidae
- Genus: Lithobates; Fitzinger, 1843

Type species
- Rana palmipes Spix, 1824

Species
- 7 to 50, depending on the definition

Synonyms
- †Anchylorana Taylor, 1942

= Lithobates =

Lithobates Temporal range: Early Miocene–present

Genus of amphibians

Lithobates is a genus of frogs belonging to the family Ranidae, native to the Americas. The name is derived from Ancient Greek: litho- (stone) and βάτης : bátēs (one that treads), meaning one that treads on rock, or rock climber. As presently defined, it includes many of eastern North America's most familiar aquatic frog species, including the American bullfrog, green frog, and the leopard frogs.

== Systematics ==
The name was defined by Hillis and Wilcox (2005) for a subgenus of four Central and South American frogs within the genus Rana. The subgenus was subsequently expanded to seven species in Central and South America in a systematic revision of the genus Rana. The name was previously used by Frost et al. as a separate genus of ranid frogs that included most of the North American frogs traditionally included in the genus Rana, including the American bullfrog and northern leopard frog. Frost used the name in this sense in the frog section of a North American common names list edited by Crother (2008). This proposed change has since been rejected by others, such as Stuart (2008), Pauly et al. (2009), AmphibiaWeb, and Yuan et al. (2016). AmphibiaWeb, available at http://amphibiaweb.org/, an online compendium of amphibian names, follows Yuan et al. (2016) in recognizing Lithobates as a subgenus. On the other hand, Amphibian Species of the World 6.0, an online reference, uses Lithobates as a genus. This definition is also followed by, e.g., the International Union for Conservation of Nature (IUCN) and the Society for the Study of Amphibians and Reptiles.

The earliest known members of this genus are known from the Early Miocene of Florida, and appear to belong to the leopard frog species complex.

== Species ==
=== Recent species ===
These species are recognised in the genus Lithobates:

- Lithobates areolatus (Baird and Girard, 1852) – crawfish frog
- Lithobates berlandieri (Baird, 1859) – Rio Grande leopard frog
- Lithobates blairi (Mecham, Littlejohn, Oldham, Brown, and Brown, 1973) – Plains leopard frog
- Lithobates brownorum (Sanders, 1973)
- Lithobates bwana (Hillis and de Sá, 1988) – Rio Chipillico frog
- Lithobates capito (LeConte, 1855) – gopher frog
- Lithobates catesbeianus (Shaw, 1802) – American bullfrog
- Lithobates chichicuahutla (Cuellar, Méndez-De La Cruz, and Villagrán-Santa Cruz, 1996) – Lago de las Minas frog
- Lithobates chiricahuensis (Platz and Mecham, 1979) – Chiricahua leopard frog
- Lithobates clamitans (Latreille, 1801) – green frog
- Lithobates dunni (Zweifel, 1957) – Patzcuaro frog
- †Lithobates fisheri (Stejneger, 1893) – Vegas Valley leopard frog or Mogollon Rim leopard frog
- Lithobates forreri (Boulenger, 1883) – Forrer's leopard frog
- Lithobates grylio (Stejneger, 1901) – pig frog
- Lithobates heckscheri (Wright, 1924) – river frog
- Lithobates johni (Blair, 1965) – Moore's frog
- Lithobates juliani (Hillis and de Sá, 1988) – Maya Mountains frog
- Lithobates kauffeldi (Feinberg, Newman, Watkins-Colwell, Schlesinger, Zarate, Curry, Shaffer, and Burger, 2014) – Atlantic Coast leopard frog
- Lithobates lenca (Luque-Montes et al., 2018)
- Lithobates lemosespinali (Smith and Chiszar, 2003) – Lemos-Espinal's leopard frog
- Lithobates macroglossa (Brocchi, 1877) – Guatemala plateau frog
- Lithobates maculatus (Brocchi, 1877) – highland frog
- Lithobates magnaocularis (Frost and Bagnara, 1974) – Northwest Mexico leopard frog
- Lithobates megapoda (Taylor, 1942) – big-footed leopard frog
- Lithobates miadis (Barbour and Loveridge, 1929) – island leopard frog
- Lithobates montezumae (Baird, 1854) – Montezuma leopard frog
- Lithobates neovolcanicus (Hillis and Frost, 1985) – transverse volcanic leopard frog
- Lithobates okaloosae (Moler, 1985) – Florida bog frog
- Lithobates omiltemanus (Günther, 1900) – Guerreran leopard frog
- Lithobates onca (Cope, 1875) – relict leopard frog
- Lithobates palmipes (Spix, 1824) – Amazon River frog
- Lithobates palustris (LeConte, 1825) – pickerel frog
- Lithobates pipiens (Schreber, 1782) – northern leopard frog
- Lithobates psilonota (Webb, 2001) – smooth-backed frog
- Lithobates pueblae (Zweifel, 1955) – Puebla frog
- Lithobates pustulosus (Boulenger, 1883) – Mexican cascades frog
- Lithobates septentrionalis (Baird, 1854) – mink frog
- Lithobates sevosus (Goin and Netting, 1940) – Mississippi gopher frog
- Lithobates sierramadrensis (Taylor, 1939) – Sierra Madre frog
- Lithobates spectabilis (Hillis and Frost, 1985) – showy leopard frog
- Lithobates sphenocephalus (Cope, 1886) – southern leopard frog
- Lithobates sylvaticus (LeConte, 1825) – wood frog
- Lithobates tarahumarae (Boulenger, 1917) – Tarahumara frog
- Lithobates taylori (Smith, 1959) – Peralta frog
- Lithobates tlaloci (Hillis and Frost, 1985) – Tlaloc's leopard frog
- Lithobates vaillanti (Brocchi, 1877) – Vaillant's frog
- Lithobates vibicarius (Cope, 1894) – green-eyed frog
- Lithobates virgatipes (Cope, 1891) – carpenter frog
- Lithobates warszewitschii (Schmidt, 1857) – Warszewitsch's frog
- Lithobates yavapaiensis (Platz and Frost, 1984) – lowland leopard frog
- Lithobates zweifeli (Hillis, Frost, and Webb, 1984) – Zweifel's frog

Alternatively, if Lithobates is treated as a subgenus (neotropical true frogs), then this narrower definition would contain the following species:

- Rana (Lithobates) bwana Hillis and de Sá, 1988 – Rio Chipillico frog
- Rana (Lithobates) juliani Hillis and de Sá, 1988 – Maya Mountains frog
- Rana (Lithobates) maculata Brocchi, 1877 – highland frog
- Rana (Lithobates) palmipes Spix, 1824 – Amazon River frog
- Rana (Lithobates) vaillanti Brocchi, 1877 – Vaillant's frog
- Rana (Lithobates) vibicaria (Cope, 1894) – green-eyed frog
- Rana (Lithobates) warszewitschii Schmidt, 1857 – Warszewitsch's frog

=== Fossil species ===
The following fossil species are known, all assignable to the L. pipiens (leopard frog) complex:

- †Lithobates bucella (Holman, 1965) (Early Miocene of Florida)
- †Lithobates dubitus (Taylor, 1942) (Pliocene/early Pleistocene of Kansas)
- †Lithobates fayeae (Taylor, 1942) (Pliocene/early Pleistocene of Kansas)
- †Lithobates moorei (Taylor, 1942) (Pliocene/early Pleistocene of Kansas)
- †Lithobates miocenicus (Holman, 1965) (Early Miocene of Florida)
- †Lithobates robustocondylus (Taylor, 1942) (Pliocene/early Pleistocene of Kansas)
- †Lithobates rexroadensis (Taylor, 1942) (Pliocene/early Pleistocene of Kansas)
- †Lithobates parvissimus (Taylor, 1942) (Pliocene/early Pleistocene of Kansas)

The species described in 1942 were previously placed in their own genus, Anchylorana.

=== Phylogeny ===
Cladogram after Martínez‐Gil et al. 2025:

- Lithobates
  - L. sylvaticus (wood frog)
  - - - L. septentrionalis (mink frog)
      - - L. grylio (pig frog)
        - - - L. clamitans (green frog)
            - L. okaloosae (Florida bog frog)
          - - L. hecksheri (river frog)
            - L. catesbeianus (American bullfrog)
    - - - - L. maculatus (highland frog)
          - - L. warszewitschii (Warszewitsch's frog)
            - L. vibicaria (green-eyed/Rancho Redondo frog)
        - - - L. vaillanti (Vaillant's frog)
            - L. juliani (Maya Mountains frog)
          - - L. bwana (Rio Chipillico frog)
            - L. palmipes (Amazon River frog)
      - - - L. sierramadrensis (Sierra Madre frog)
          - L. tarahumarae (Tarahumara frog)
        - - - L. pipiens (northern leopard frog)
            - - L. chiricahuensis (Chiricahua leopard frog)
              - - L. montezumae (Montezuma leopard frog)
                - L. dunni (Patzcuaro frog)
          - - - L. palustris (pickerel frog)
              - - L. areolatus (crawfish frog)
                - - L. sevosus (Mississippi gopher frog)
                  - L. capito (gopher frog)
            - - - L. sphenocephalus (southern leopard frog)
                - - L. blairi (plains leopard frog)
                  - L. berlandieri (Rio Grande leopard frog)
              - - L. macroglossa (Guatemala plateau frog)
                - - - L. forreri (Forrer's grass frog)
                    - L. omiltemanus (Guerreran leopard frog)
                  - - L. magnaocularis (Northwest Mexico leopard frog)
                    - - L. onca (relict leopard frog)
                      - L. yavapaiensis (lowland leopard frog)
