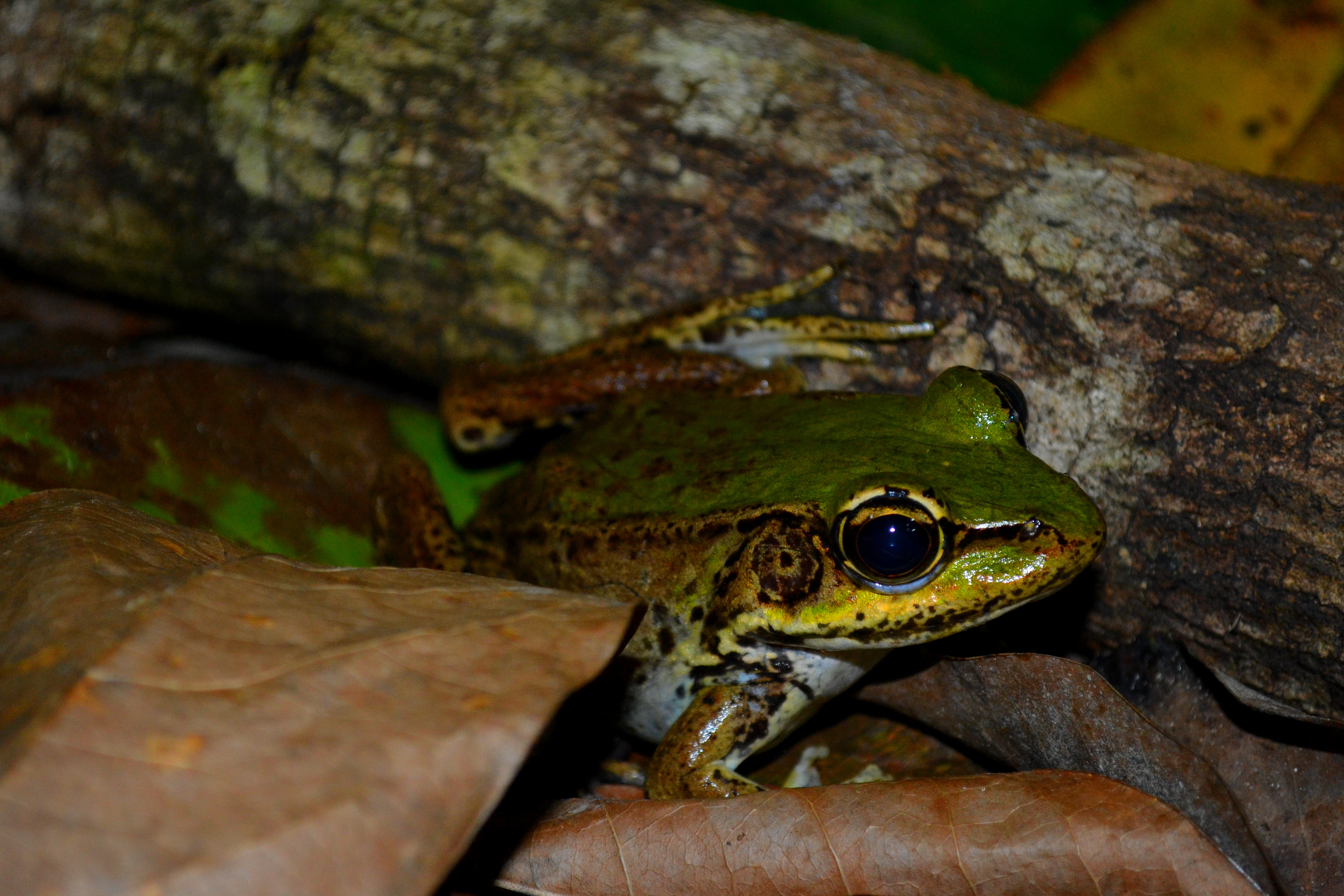

Conservation status
- Least Concern (IUCN 3.1)

Scientific classification
- Kingdom: Animalia
- Phylum: Chordata
- Class: Amphibia
- Order: Anura
- Family: Ranidae
- Genus: Lithobates
- Species: L. palmipes

Binomial name
- Lithobates palmipes (Spix, 1824)

Synonyms
- Rana palmipes Spix, 1824; Ranula affinis (Peters, 1859); Ranula gollmerii Peters, 1859; Hylarana brevipalmata (Cope, 1874); Pohlia palmipes (Spix, 1824); Rana clamata subsp. guianensis Peters, 1863; Rana juninensis Tschudi, 1845; Rana copii Boulenger, 1882; Rana affinis Peters, 1859; Ranula nigrilatus Cope, 1874; Rana nigrilatus (Cope, 1874)

= Amazon River frog =

Species of amphibian

The Amazon River frog (Lithobates palmipes) is a species of frog in the family Ranidae that occurs in the northern and Amazonian South America east of the Andes (Brazil, Bolivia, Peru, Ecuador, Colombia, Venezuela, Guyana, Suriname, French Guiana, and Trinidad), with scattered records from northeastern Brazil. In Spanish, it is known as rana verde verdadera. Its natural habitats are tropical rainforests near permanent waterbodies. It is not considered threatened by the International Union for Conservation of Nature. It is highly appreciated as food by the Ye'kwana of southeastern Venezuela.
