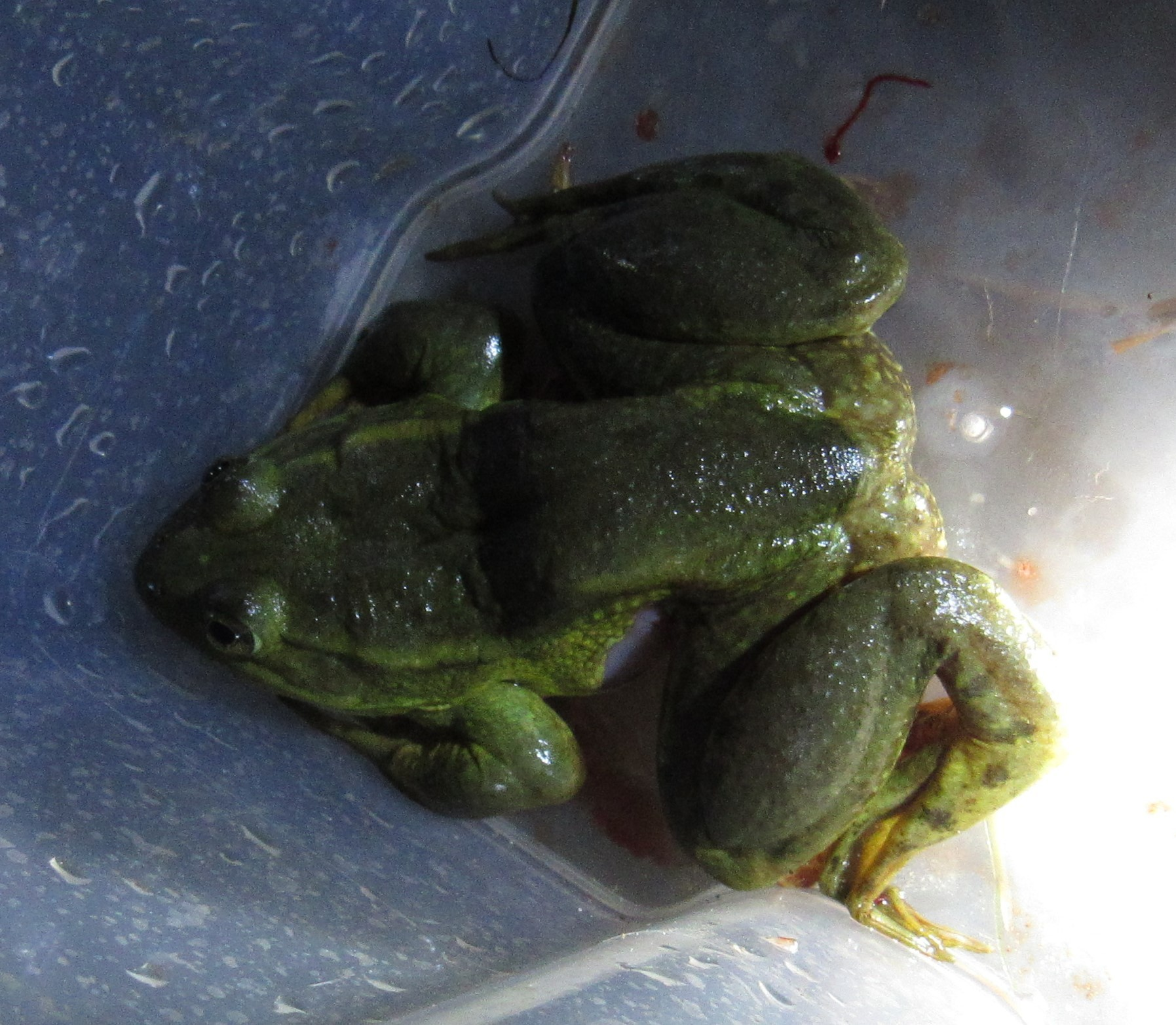

Conservation status
- Near Threatened (IUCN 3.1)

Scientific classification
- Kingdom: Animalia
- Phylum: Chordata
- Class: Amphibia
- Order: Anura
- Family: Ranidae
- Genus: Lithobates
- Species: L. megapoda

Binomial name
- Lithobates megapoda (Taylor, 1942)

Synonyms
- Rana megapoda Taylor, 1942; Rana trilobata Mocquard, 1899

= Lithobates megapoda =

Species of frog

The big-footed leopard frog or bigfoot leopard frog (Lithobates megapoda, formerly Rana megapoda), is a species of frog in the family Ranidae endemic to western central Mexico where it is found in the Nayarit, Jalisco, Michoacán, and Guanajuato states.

== Description ==
Lithobates megapoda are large, robust frogs. Females can be as large as 157 mm (6.2 in) in snout–vent length, whereas males are somewhat smaller, up to 112–117 mm (4.4–4.6 in). The back is of various shades of brown and patternless or (usually) with dark brown blotches that vary in numbers, size, and shape. The tadpoles are about 25–27 mm (0.98–1.06 in) at metamorphosis.

== Habitat ==
Lithobates megapoda is predominantly an aquatic frog. It inhabits permanent lakes, rivers and pools in shrubland and pine-oak forests; breeding takes place in the same habitats.

== Usage and conservation ==
Lithobates megapoda is collected for human consumption. There is also archaeological evidence suggesting that these frogs were an important component in the diet of the native communities in the Laguna de Magdalena Basin (Jalisco) during both prehispanic and colonial periods. A single frog may produce as much as 300 grams (11 oz) flesh.

This previously common frog has declined in abundance, particularly in the southern parts of its range. Threats to it include pollution, collection for food, and habitat loss (logging of pine-oak forests).
