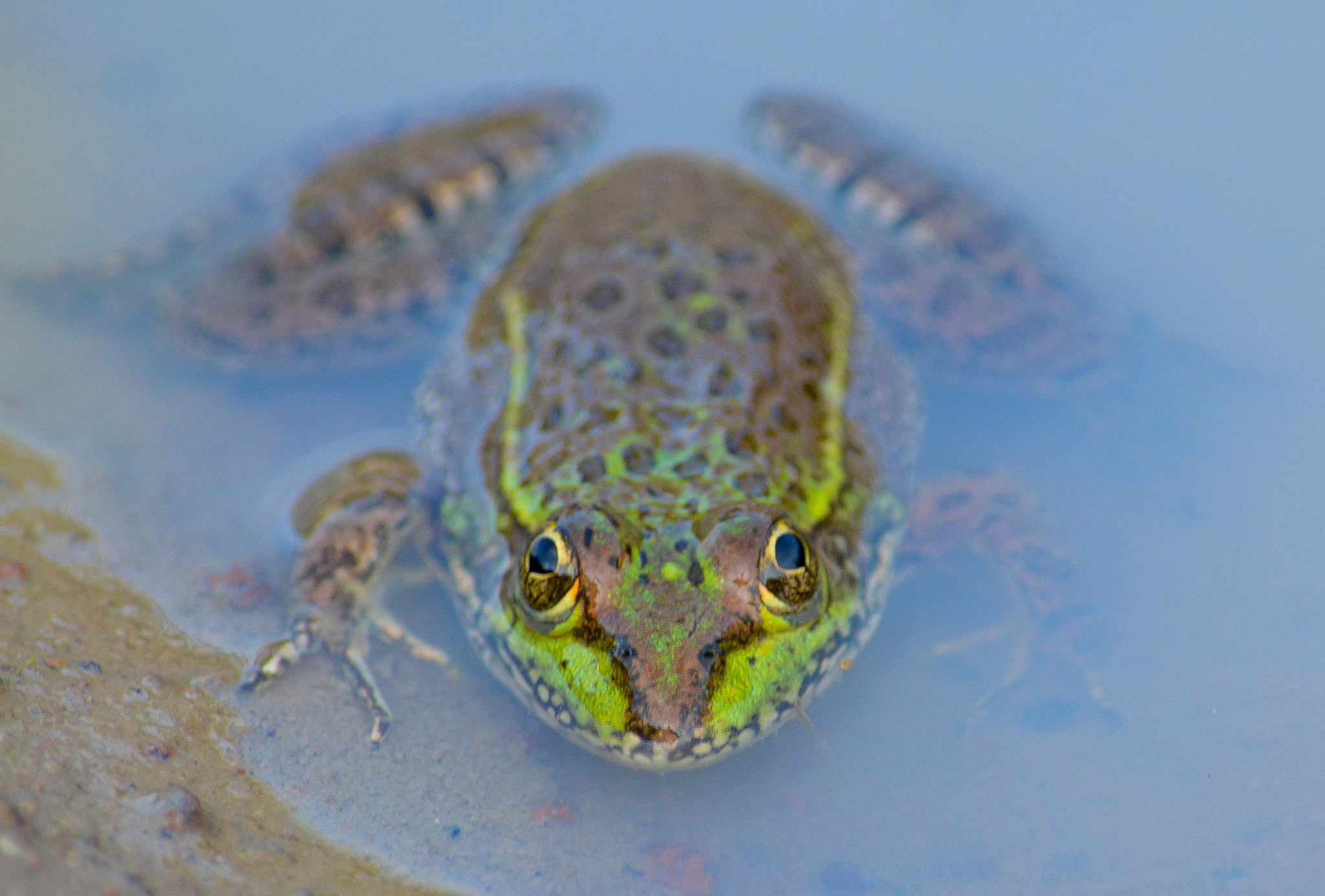

Conservation status
- Least Concern (IUCN 3.1)

Scientific classification
- Kingdom: Animalia
- Phylum: Chordata
- Class: Amphibia
- Order: Anura
- Family: Ranidae
- Genus: Lithobates
- Species: L. montezumae

Binomial name
- Lithobates montezumae (Baird, 1854)

Synonyms
- Rana montezumae Baird, 1854

= Montezuma leopard frog =

Species of amphibian

The Montezuma leopard frog (Lithobates montezumae) is a species of frog in the family Ranidae endemic to Mexico. Its natural habitats are pine-oak or oak forests above 2,000 m (6,600 ft) asl but it can also survive in moderately altered habitats. It breeds in lakes and big pools. It is potentially threatened by habitat loss and introduced predators. It is also collected for human consumption.
