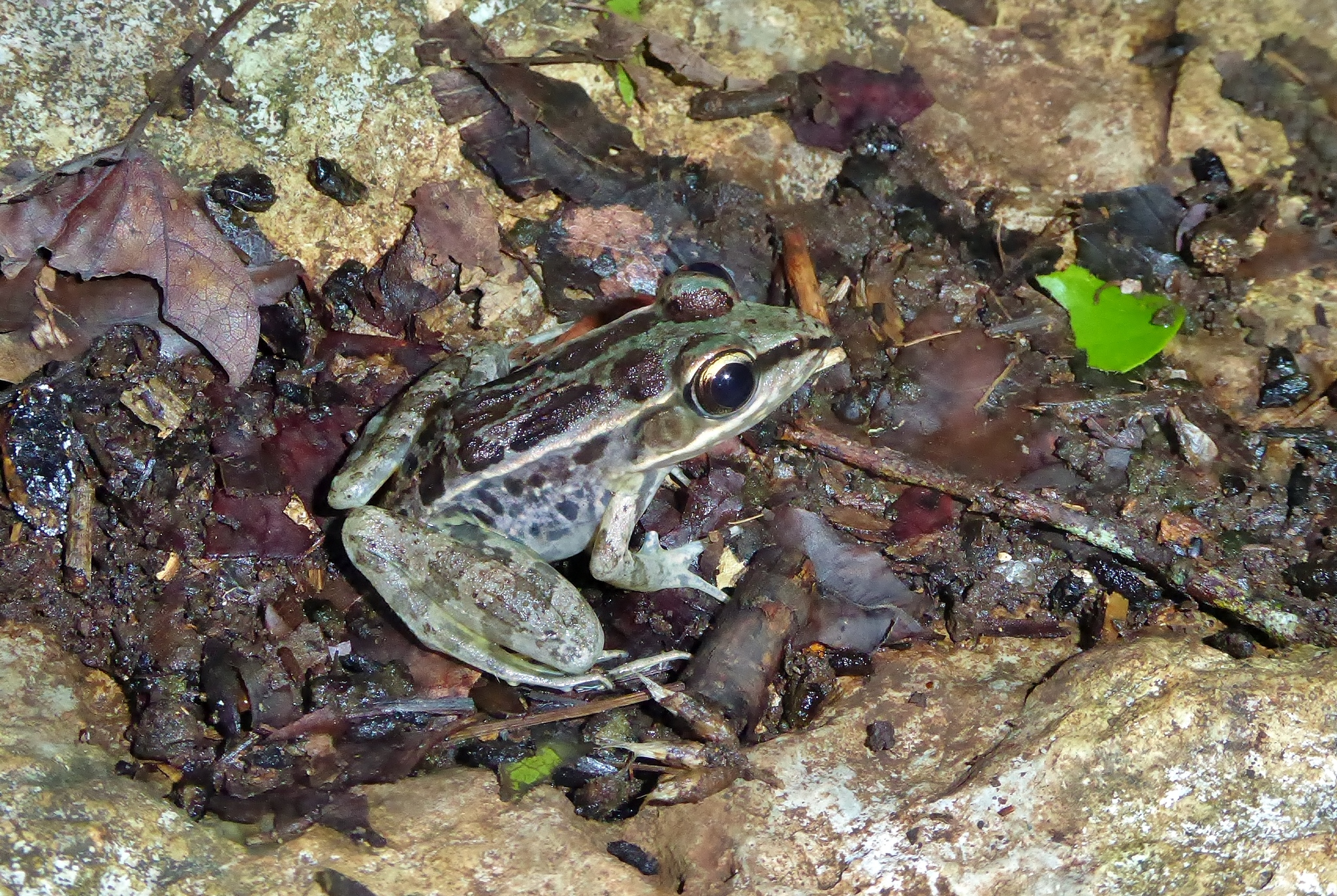

Conservation status
- Least Concern (IUCN 3.1)

Scientific classification
- Kingdom: Animalia
- Phylum: Chordata
- Class: Amphibia
- Order: Anura
- Family: Ranidae
- Genus: Lithobates
- Species: L. brownorum

Binomial name
- Lithobates brownorum (Sanders, 1973)

Synonyms
- Rana berlandieri brownorum Sanders, 1973

= Lithobates brownorum =

Species of amphibian

Lithobates brownorum, commonly known as Browns' leopard frog, is a species of frog native to southern Veracruz and northeastern Oaxaca east through the Yucatan Peninsula and the uplands of Chiapas in southern Mexico through Guatemala and Honduras to Nicaragua. Its separateness from Lithobates berlandieri has been questioned but molecular data now supports the conclusion that it is a separate species.
