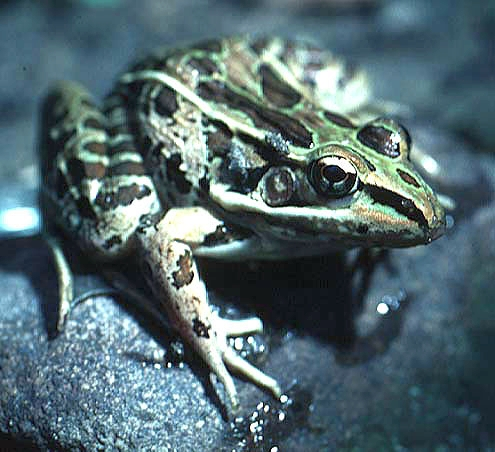

Conservation status
- Least Concern (IUCN 3.1)

Scientific classification
- Kingdom: Animalia
- Phylum: Chordata
- Class: Amphibia
- Order: Anura
- Family: Ranidae
- Genus: Lithobates
- Species: L. forreri

Binomial name
- Lithobates forreri (Boulenger, 1883)

Synonyms
- Rana forreri Boulenger, 1883

= Forrer's grass frog =

Species of amphibian

Forrer's grass frog or Forrer's leopard frog (Lithobates forreri) is a species of frog in the family Ranidae found in Mexico and Central America through Guatemala, El Salvador, Honduras, and Nicaragua to Costa Rica. It is a widespread and common frog found in lowland and seasonal tropical forests. It can also adapt to man-made habitats such as flooded agricultural lands and other water content systems. Reproduction requires permanent pools and lagoons.
