= Rana neba =

Conservation status
- Least Concern (IUCN 3.1)

Scientific classification
- Kingdom: Animalia
- Phylum: Chordata
- Class: Amphibia
- Order: Anura
- Family: Ranidae
- Genus: Rana
- Species: R. neba

Binomial name
- Rana neba Ryuzaki et al., 2014

True frog species

Rana neba is a species of true frog that was discovered in 2014 using genetic analysis and bioacoustics. It is thought to have originated quite recently. It was previously considered a part of a subspecies of Tago's brown frog, but the population was distinct enough to be considered its own species. It is found approx. 1200 meters above sea level on Mt. Chausu, Japan, and in the surrounding area within a radius of 40 kilometers or less.

== Description ==
Rana neba is brown with black bands on the legs and black, somewhat triangular markings on its back and eyelids. The tympana (temples) are black. The throat and abdomen are greyish and speckled. The underside of its legs is not speckled but a consistent orangish color. Its call is higher pitched than its previously designated subspecies Rana tagoi tagoi, a subspecies of Tago's brown frog. The SVL of Rana neba is about 3.8–4.8 cm (1.5–1.9 in), and there is seemingly no sexual dimorphism in terms of SVL, only in minor measurements e.g. the thickness of the forearm.

== Etymology ==
The name Rana neba is derived from the village Neba-mura, Japan, which is within the distribution of Rana neba.
