= Rana zhijinensis =

Scientific classification
- Kingdom: Animalia
- Phylum: Chordata
- Class: Amphibia
- Order: Anura
- Family: Ranidae
- Genus: Rana
- Species: R. zhijinensis

Binomial name
- Rana zhijinensis Luo, Xiao & Zhou, 2022

Species of frog

Rana zhijinensis, the Zhijin brown frog, is a species of true frog native to the Guizhou Province, China.

== Description ==
The Zhijin brown frog is a medium-sized light brown frog. It shares some characteristics with its sister taxon, the Chaochiao frog (Rana chaochiaoensis). The SVL ranges from around 46–54 mm (1.8–2.1 in) in males and 55–59 mm (2.2–2.3 in) in females. It has a round, visible tympanum that is similar in color to the rest of the dorsal side of the frog. The dorsal side of the legs is striped, with the hindlimbs being more visibly striped/banded. Its lateral sides are speckled. It has a slender body with conspicuous dorsolateral folds. In the middle of the back, there is a black, upside-down V-shape. Ventrally, the frog is off-white with reddish hindlimbs.

== Distribution and ecology ==
The Zhijin brown frog has only been collected in a small body of water outside of a cave at an altitude of 645–728 m (2,116–2,388 ft). They are thought to breed from late June to mid-August because eggs were only collected from late July to mid-August.

== Etymology ==
The species name Rana zhijinensis is derived from the type locality, Zhijin County in the Guizhou Province. The suffix "-ensis" means "originating in" or "pertaining to".
