= Rana sangzhiensis =

Conservation status
- Least Concern (IUCN 3.1)

Scientific classification
- Kingdom: Animalia
- Phylum: Chordata
- Class: Amphibia
- Order: Anura
- Family: Ranidae
- Genus: Rana
- Species: R. sangzhiensis

Binomial name
- Rana sangzhiensis Shen, 1986

Synonyms
- Pseudorana sangzhiensis Fei, Ye, and Huang, 1990; Rana zhengi Zhao, 1999

Species of frog

Rana sangzhiensis is a species of frog in the family Ranidae, the "true frogs". It is endemic to China. It occurs at its type locality of Mount Tianping in Sangzhi County, Hunan, Mount Dadong in Lianxian County, Guangdong, and Mount Emei in Hongya County, Sichuan. The common names Sangzhi frog and Sangzhi groove-toed frog have been proposed for it. It was formerly classified in the genus Pseudorana.

Rana sangzhiensis lives in hilly forest areas near streams, or bamboo forests in its Sichuan range. Breeding takes place in streams. One population occurs within Badagongshan National Nature Reserve.
