= Tagoi =

Tagoi may be,

- Tagoi language, Sudan
- Rana tagoi, the Tago frog
