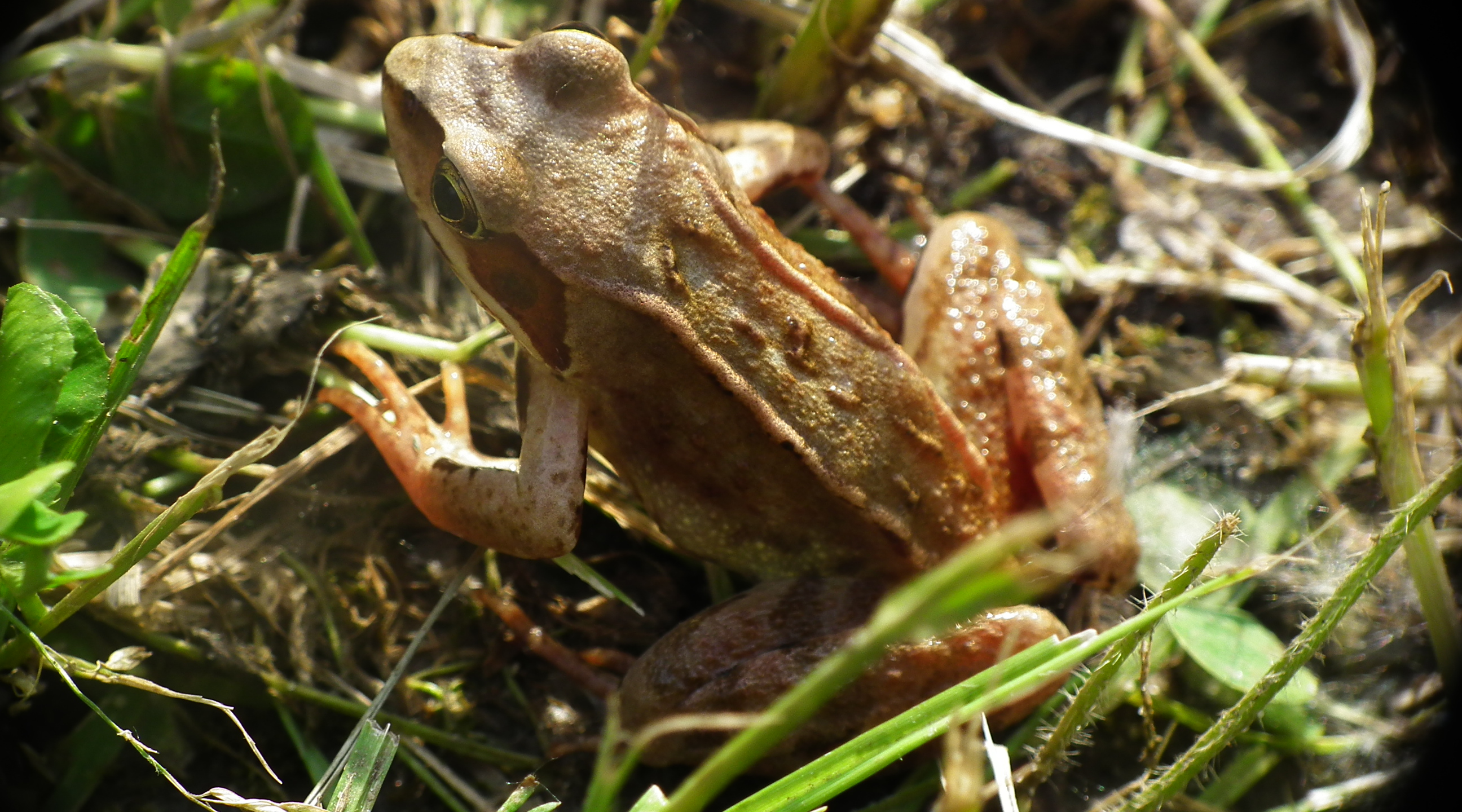
- Common frog (Rana temporaria)

Scientific classification
- Kingdom: Animalia
- Phylum: Chordata
- Class: Amphibia
- Order: Anura
- Family: Ranidae
- Genus: Rana; Linnaeus, 1758

Type species
- Rana temporaria Linnaeus, 1758

Synonyms
- Pseudoamolops Jiang et al., 1997; and see text

= Rana (genus) =

Rana Temporal range: Early Miocene–present

Genus of amphibians

Rana (derived from Latin rana, meaning 'frog') is a genus of frogs commonly known as the Holarctic true frogs, pond frogs or brown frogs. Members of this genus are found through much of Eurasia and western North America. Many other genera were formerly included here. These true frogs are usually largish species characterized by their slim waists and wrinkled skin; many have thin ridges running along their backs, but they generally lack "warts" as in typical toads. They are excellent jumpers due to their long, slender legs. The typical webbing found on their hind feet allows for easy movement through water. Coloration is mostly greens and browns above, with darker and yellowish spots.

== Behavior ==
Many frogs in this genus breed in early spring, although subtropical and tropical species may breed throughout the year. Males of most of the species are known to call, but a few species are thought to be voiceless. Females lay eggs in rafts or large, globular clusters, and can produce up to 20,000 at one time.

== Diet ==
Rana species feed mainly on insects and invertebrates, but swallow anything they can fit into their mouths, including small vertebrates. Among their predators are egrets, crocodiles, and snakes.

== Systematics ==
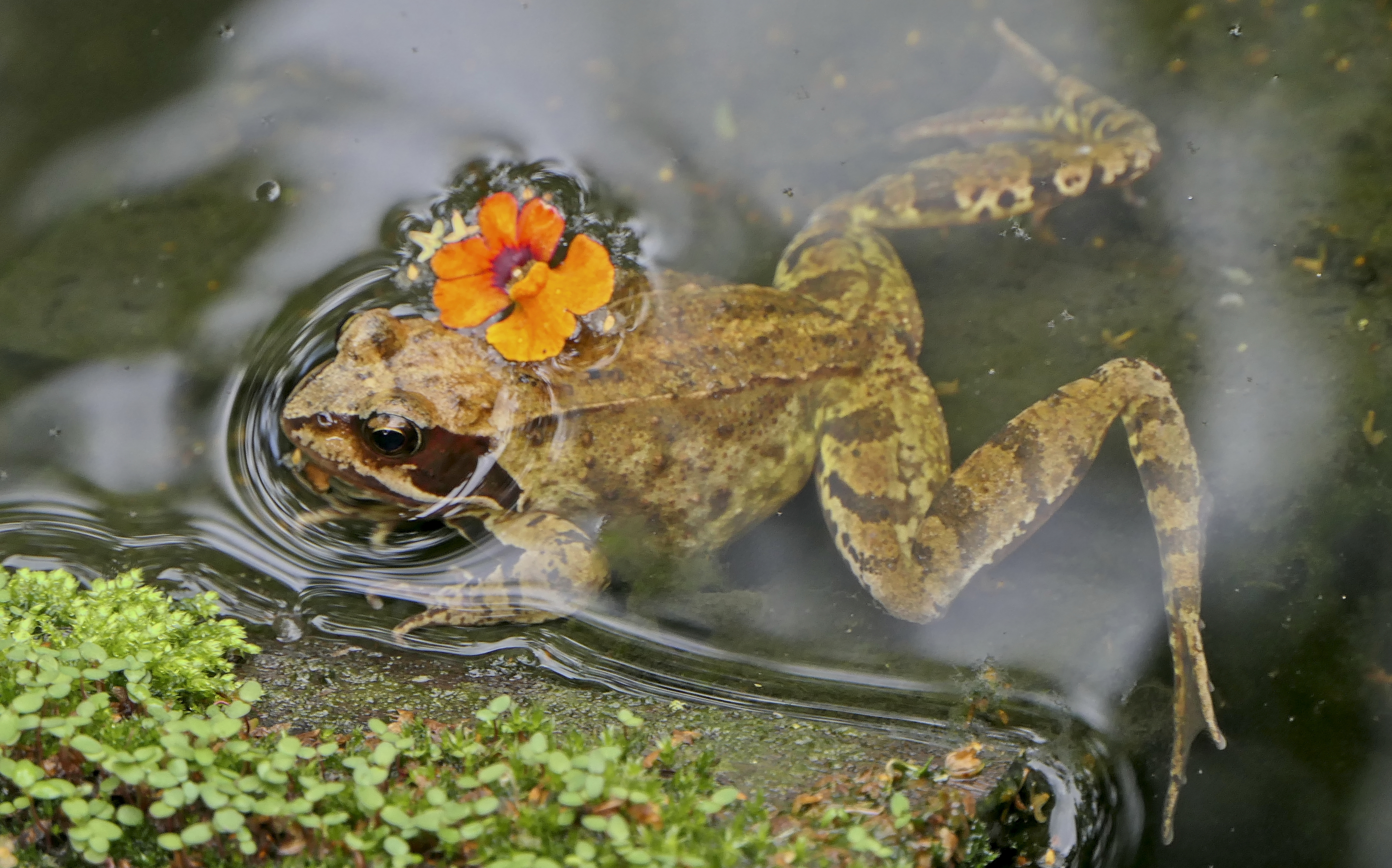
Common frog (Rana temporaria), a member of the Eurasian clade and the type species of the genus and family as a whole

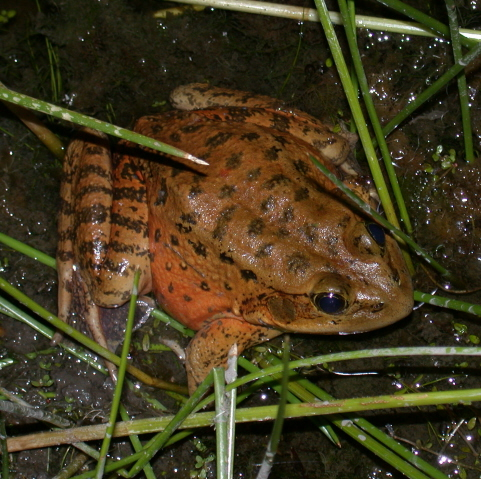
California red-legged frog (R. draytonii), a member of the North American clade and one of the largest members of the genus

Some 50 to 100 extant species are now placed in this genus by various authors; many other species formerly placed in Rana are now placed elsewhere. Frost restricted Rana to the Old World true frogs and the Eurasian brown and pond frogs of the common frog R. temporaria group, although other authors disagreed with this arrangement. In 2016, a consortium of Rana researchers from throughout Europe, Asia, and North America revised the group, and reported that the arrangement of Frost (2006) resulted in nonmonophyletic groups. Yuan et al. (2016) included all the North American ranids within Rana, and used subgenera for the well-differentiated species groups within Rana. Both of these classifications are presented below.

Genera recently split from Rana are Babina, Clinotarsus (including Nasirana), Glandirana, Hydrophylax, Hylarana, Lithobates, Odorrana (including Wurana), Pelophylax, Pulchrana, Sanguirana, and Sylvirana. Of these, Odorrana and Lithobates are so closely related to Rana proper, they could conceivably be included here once again. The others seem to be far more distant relatives, in particular Pelophylax.

New species are still being described in some numbers. A number of extinct species are in the genus, including Rana basaltica, from Miocene deposits in China.

=== Species ===
The following species are recognised in the genus Rana:

- Rana amurensis (Boulenger, 1886) – Siberian tree frog, Siberian wood frog, Amur brown frog
- Rana arvalis – Moor frog
- Rana asiatica – Central Asiatic frog, Asian frog
- Rana aurora – Northern red-legged frog
- Rana boylii – Foothill yellow-legged frog
- Rana cascadae – Cascades frog
- Rana chaochiaoensis – Chaochiao frog
- Rana chensinensis – Asiatic grass frog, Chinese brown frog
- Rana chevronta – Chevron-spotted brown frog
- Rana coreana – Korean brown frog
- Rana dalmatina – Agile frog
- Rana draytonii – California red-legged frog
- Rana dybowskii – Dybowski's frog
- Rana graeca – Greek stream frog, Greek frog
- Rana hanluica
- Rana huanrenensis – Huanren frog
- Rana iberica – Iberian frog
- Rana italica – Italian stream frog
- Rana japonica – Japanese brown frog
- Rana jiemuxiensis – Jiemuxi brown frog
- Rana johnsi – Johns' groove-toed frog
- Rana kobai – Ryukyu brown frog
- Rana kukunoris – Plateau brown frog
- Rana latastei – Italian agile frog, Lataste's frog
- Rana longicrus – Taipa frog
- Rana luanchuanensis
- Rana luteiventris – Columbia spotted frog
- Rana macrocnemis – Long-legged wood frog, Caucasus frog, Turkish frog, Brusa frog
- Rana maoershanensis
- Rana muscosa – Southern mountain yellow-legged frog
- Rana matsuoi – Goto Tago’s brown frog
- Rana neba
- Rana omeimontis – Omei brown frog, Omei wood frog
- Rana ornativentris – Montane brown frog, Nikkō frog
- Rana pirica – Hokkaidō frog
- Rana pretiosa – Oregon spotted frog
- Rana pseudodalmatina
- Rana pyrenaica – Pyrenean frog, Pyrenees frog
- Rana sakuraii – Stream brown frog, Napparagawa frog
- Rana sauteri – Sauter's brown frog, Kanshirei village frog, Taiwan groove-toed frog, Taiwan pseudotorrent frog
- Rana sangzhiensis – Sangzhi frog, Sangzhi groove-toed frog
- Rana shuchinae – Sichuan frog
- Rana sierrae – Sierra Nevada yellow-legged frog, Sierra Nevada Mountain yellow-legged frog
- Rana tagoi – Tago's brown frog
- Rana tavasensis – Tavas frog
- Rana temporaria – Common frog, European common frog, European common brown frog, European grass frog
- Rana tsushimensis – Tsushima brown frog, Tsushima leopard frog
- Rana uenoi
- Rana ulma – Okinawa frog
- Rana zhenhaiensis – Zhenhai brown frog

*Rana maoershanensis is likely not its own species, according to new genetic research.

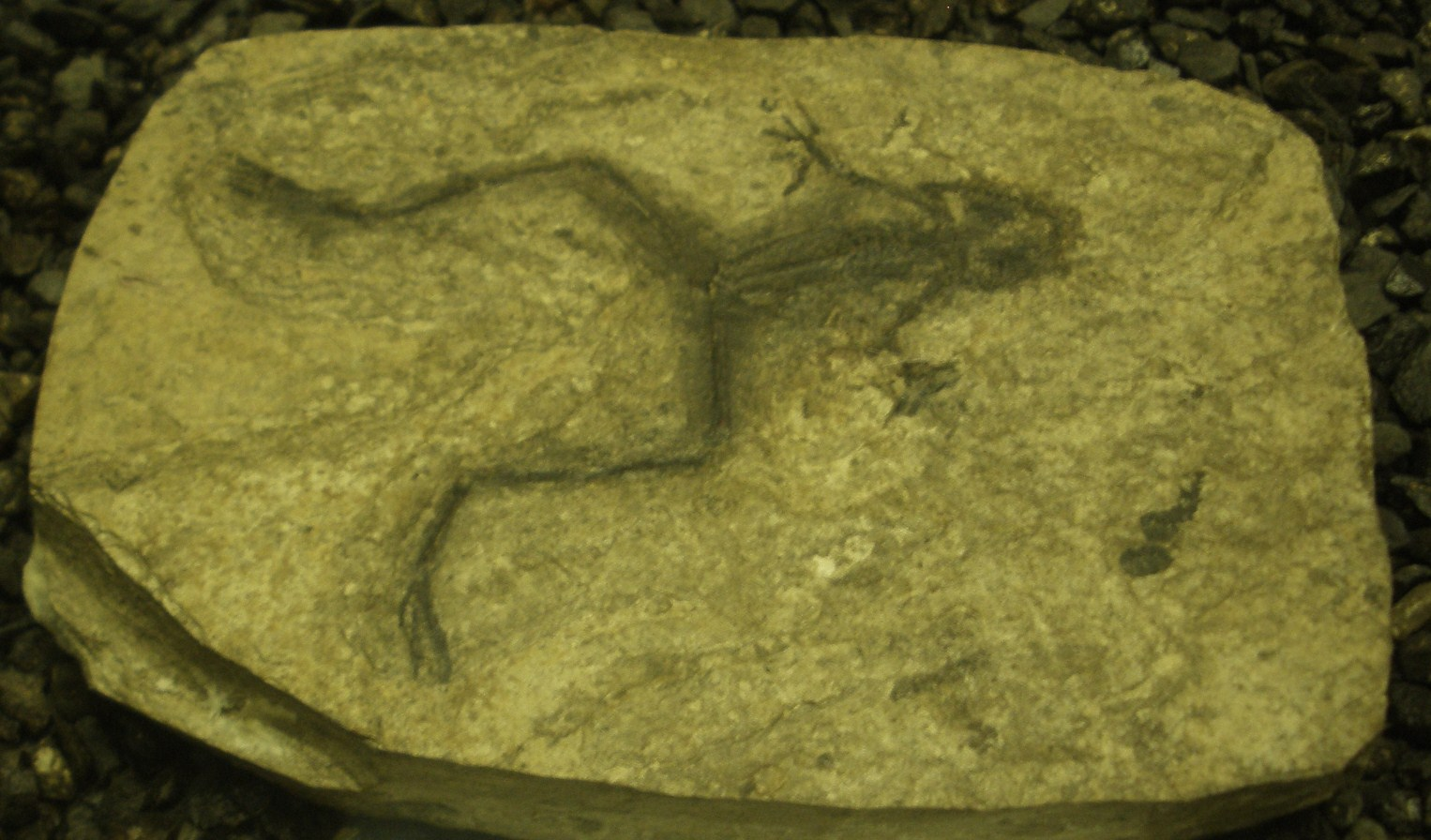
Rana basaltica, a fossil species from China

The following fossil species are also known:

- †Rana architemporaria (Pliocene of Japan)
- †Rana basaltica (Miocene of China)
- †?Rana hipparionum (Late Miocene/Early Pliocene of China, nomen dubium)
- †Rana pliocenica (Late Miocene of California)
- †Rana muelleri (Pleistocene of Germany)
- †Rana strausi (Late Pliocene of Germany)
- †?Rana yushensis (Early Pliocene of China, nomen nudum)

The earliest known fossils of true Rana are of an indeterminate species from the Early Miocene of Germany. The paleosubspecies Rana temporaria fossilis was described in 1951 for articulated fossils from the late Eocene/early Oligocene of Bulgaria, but this taxonomic proposal was found to be invalid. Rana likely originated in Asia and migrated west to colonize Europe by the early Miocene, as was done earlier by Pelophylax.

==== Alternative classifications ====
AmphibiaWeb includes the following species, arranged in subgenera:

Subgenus Amerana (Pacific brown frogs)

- Rana aurora – northern red-legged frog
- Rana boylii – foothill yellow-legged frog
- Rana cascadae – Cascades frog
- Rana draytonii – California red-legged frog
- Rana luteiventris – Columbia spotted frog
- Rana muscosa – southern mountain yellow-legged frog
- Rana pretiosa – Oregon spotted frog
- Rana sierrae – Sierra Nevada yellow-legged frog, Sierra Nevada Mountain yellow-legged frog

Subgenus Aquarana (North American water frogs)

- Rana catesbeiana Shaw, 1802 – American bullfrog
- Rana clamitans Latreille, 1801 – green frog, bronze frog, northern green frog
- Rana grylio Stejneger, 1901 – pig frog
- Rana heckscheri Wright, 1924 – river frog
- Rana okaloosae Moler, 1985 – Florida bog frog
- Rana septentrionalis Baird, 1854 – mink frog
- Rana virgatipes Cope, 1891 – carpenter frog

Subgenus Lithobates (neotropical true frogs)

- Rana bwana Hillis and de Sá, 1988 – Rio Chipillico frog
- Rana juliani Hillis and de Sá, 1988 – Maya Mountains frog
- Rana maculata Brocchi, 1877
- Rana palmipes Spix, 1824 – Amazon River frog
- Rana vaillanti Brocchi, 1877 – Vaillant's frog
- Rana vibicaria (Cope, 1894)
- Rana warszewitschii Schmidt, 1857

Subgenus Liuhurana

- Rana shuchinae Liu, 1950

Subgenus Pantherana (leopard, pickerel and gopher frogs)

- Rana areolata Baird and Girard, 1852 – crawfish frog
- Rana berlandieri Baird, 1859 – Rio Grande leopard frog
- Rana blairi Mecham et al., 1973 – plains leopard frog
- Rana brownorum Sanders, 1973 – Gulf Coast leopard frog
- Rana capito LeConte, 1855 – Carolina gopher frog
- Rana chichicuahutla Cuellar, Méndez-De La Cruz, and Villagrán-Santa Cruz, 1996
- Rana chiricahuensis Platz and Mecham, 1979 – Chiricahua leopard frog
- Rana dunni Zweifel, 1957 – Lake Patzcuaro frog
- Rana fisheri Stejneger, 1893 – Mogollon Rim leopard frog
- Rana forreri (Boulenger, 1883) – Forrer's leopard frog
- Rana kauffeldi Feinberg et al., 2014 – Atlantic Coast leopard frog
- Rana lemosespinali Smith and Chiszar, 2003
- Rana lenca (Luque-Montes et al., 2018)
- Rana macroglossa Brocchi, 1877
- Rana magnaocularis Frost and Bagnara, 1974
- Rana megapoda Taylor, 1942
- Rana miadis Barbour and Loveridge, 1929
- Rana montezumae Baird, 1854
- Rana neovolcanica Hillis and Frost, 1985
- Rana omiltemana Günther, 1900
- Rana onca Cope, 1875 – relict leopard frog
- Rana palustris LeConte, 1825 – pickerel frog
- Rana pipiens Schreber, 1782 – northern leopard frog
- Rana sevosa Goin and Netting, 1940 – dusky gopher frog
- Rana spectabilis Hillis and Frost, 1985 – brilliant leopard frog
- Rana sphenocephala Cope, 1886 – southern leopard frog
- Rana taylori Smith, 1959 – Peralta frog
- Rana tlaloci Hillis and Frost, 1985 – Tlaloc's leopard frog
- Rana yavapaiensis Platz and Frost, 1984 – lowland leopard frog

Subgenus Pseudorana (Weining brown frog)

- Rana weiningensis

Subgenus Rana (Eurasian brown frogs)

- Rana amurensis – Siberian tree frog, Siberian wood frog, Amur brown frog
- Rana arvalis – moor frog
- Rana asiatica – Central Asiatic frog, Asian frog
- Rana camerani – long-legged wood frog
- Rana chaochiaoensis – Chaochiao frog
- Rana chensinensis – Asiatic grass frog, Chinese brown frog
- Rana chevronta – chevron-spotted brown frog
- Rana coreana – Korean brown frog
- Rana culaiensis – Culai brown frog
- Rana dalmatina – agile frog
- Rana dybowskii – Dybowski's frog
- Rana graeca – Greek stream frog, Greek frog
- Rana hanluica
- Rana holtzi – long-legged wood frog
- Rana huanrenensis – Huanren frog
- Rana iberica – Iberian frog
- Rana italica – Italian stream frog
- Rana japonica – Japanese brown frog
- Rana jiemuxiensis – Jiemuxi brown frog
- Rana johnsi – Johns' groove-toed frog
- Rana kobai – Ryukyu brown frog
- Rana kukunoris – plateau brown frog
- Rana latastei – Italian agile frog, Lataste's frog
- Rana longicrus – Taipa frog
- Rana macrocnemis – long-legged wood frog, Caucasus frog, Turkish frog, Brusa frog
- Rana maoershanensis
- Rana neba
- Rana omeimontis – Omei brown frog, Omei wood frog
- Rana ornativentris – montane brown frog, Nikkō frog
- Rana pirica – Hokkaidō frog
- Rana pseudodalmatina
- Rana pyrenaica – Pyrenean frog, Pyrenees frog
- Rana sakuraii – stream brown frog, Napparagawa frog
- Rana sangzhiensis
- Rana sauteri – Sauter's brown frog, Kanshirei village frog, Taiwan groove-toed frog, Taiwan pseudotorrent frog
- Rana tagoi – Tago's brown frog
- Rana tavasensis – Tavas brown frog
- Rana temporaria – common frog, European common frog, European common brown frog, European grass frog
- Rana tsushimensis – Tsushima brown frog, Tsushima leopard frog
- Rana uenoi
- Rana ulma
- Rana wuyiensis – Wuyi brown frog
- Rana zhengi
- Rana zhenhaiensis – Zhenhai brown frog
- Rana zhijinensis Luo, Xiao & Zhou, 2022 – Zhijin brown frog

Subgenus Zweifelia (Mexican torrent frogs)

- Rana johni Blair, 1965
- Rana psilonota Webb, 2001
- Rana pueblae Zweifel, 1955
- Rana pustulosa (Boulenger, 1883)
- Rana sierramadrensis Taylor, 1939
- Rana tarahumarae (Boulenger, 1917) – Tarahumara frog
- Rana zweifeli Hillis, Frost, and Webb, 1984 – Zweifel's frog

Incertae sedis (no assigned subgenus)

- Rana dabieshanensis Wang et al., 2017
- Rana luanchuanensis Zhao and Yuan, 2017
- Rana sylvatica LeConte, 1825 – wood frog

Notes on other taxonomic arrangements:

The harpist brown frog, Kampira Falls frog, or Yaeyama harpist frog was formerly known as R. psaltes; it was subsequently identified as the long-known R. okinavana. The latter name has been misapplied to the Ryūkyū brown frog, but the harpist brown frog is a rather distinct species that apparently belongs in Babina or Nidirana if these are considered valid.

=== Phylogeny ===
Cladogram after Martínez‐Gil et al. 2025:

- Rana
  - R. shuchinae (Sichuan frog)
  - - - R. luteiventris (Columbia spotted frog)
      - - R. boylii (Foothill yellow-legged frog)
        - - - R. sierrae (Sierra Nevada yellow-legged frog)
            - R. muscosa (Mountain yellow-legged frog)
          - - R. aurora (Northern red-legged frog)
            - R. cascadae (Cascades frog)
    - - - R. johnsi (Johns' groove-toed frog)
        - R. sangzhiensis (Sangzhi frog)
      - - - - R. macrocnemis (long-legged wood frog)
            - - R. graeca (Greek stream frog)
              - - R. latastei (Italian agile frog)
                - R. dalmatina (agile frog)
          - - R. iberica (Iberian frog)
            - - R. arvalis (moor frog)
              - - R. temporaria (common frog)
                - R. pyrenaica (Pyrenean frog)
        - - - R. sauteri (Taiwan groove-toed frog)
            - - R. tagoi (Tago frog)
              - R. sakuraii (stream brown frog)
          - - - - R. dybowskii (Dybowski's frog)
                - R. pirica (Hokkaidō frog)
              - - R. ornativentris (montane brown frog)
                - - R. kukunoris (plateau brown frog)
                  - - R. huanrensis (Huanren frog)
                    - R. chensinensis (Asiatic grass frog)
            - - - R. amurensis (Siberian wood frog)
                - R. coreana (Korean brown frog)
              - - R. tsushimensis (Tsushima brown frog)
                - - R. japonica (Japanese brown frog)
                  - - R. omeimontis (Omei brown frog)
                    - R. longicrus (Taipa frog)
