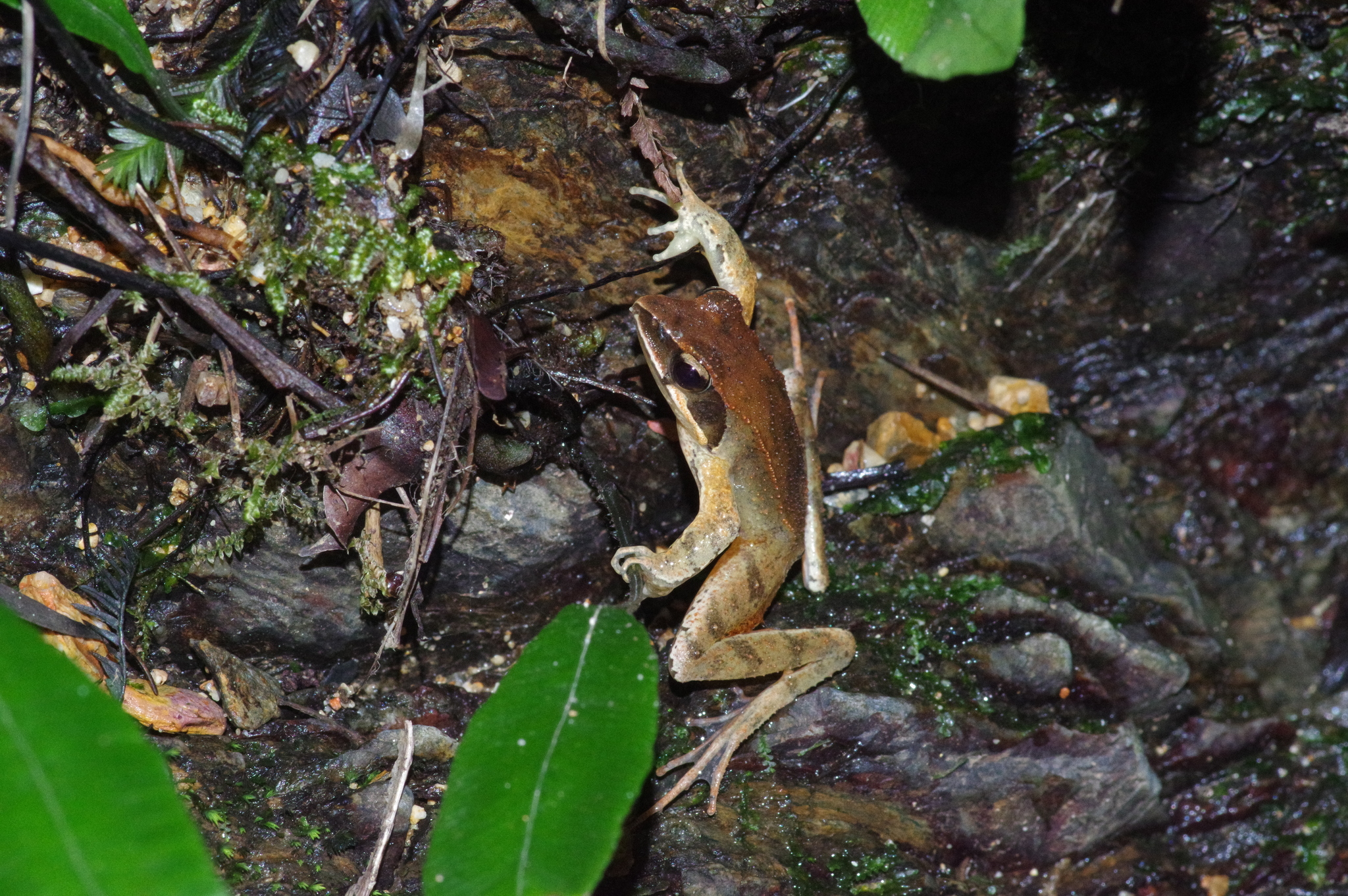

Conservation status
- Vulnerable (IUCN 3.1)

Scientific classification
- Kingdom: Animalia
- Phylum: Chordata
- Class: Amphibia
- Order: Anura
- Family: Ranidae
- Genus: Rana
- Species: R. ulma

Binomial name
- Rana ulma Matsui, 2011

Synonyms
- Rana (Rana) ulma –Yuan et al., 2016

= Rana ulma =

Species of amphibian

Rana ulma is a species of frog in the family Ranidae. It is endemic to Okinawa Islands, in the central Ryukyu Islands of Japan. It is currently only known from northern Okinawa Island and from Kume Island. Common names Okinawa frog and Ryukyu brown frog have been used for this species; the latter can refer to this species or to Rana kobai. The specific name ulma means "coral island" in Uruma dialect of Okinawa.

== Taxonomy ==
Before 2011, frogs now known as Rana ulma, together with those of its close relative Rana kobai from the neighboring Amami Islands, had been misidentified as Rana okinavana. Rana ulma and R. kobai form a clade that is the sister group for Rana tsushimensis. All three species share similar general appearance.

== Description ==
Adult males measure 33–39 mm (1.3–1.5 in) and adult females 42–51 mm (1.7–2.0 in) in snout–vent length (SVL). The snout is low and fairly pointed. The tympanum is distinct and relatively large (more so in males than in females). A supratympanic fold is present. The forelimbs are rather stout whereas the hindlimbs are long. The fingers are slender and have no webbing. The toes are moderately webbed. Alcohol-preserved specimens are dorsally light gray brown. A distinct dark brown marking runs over the eye and tympanum towards the arm insertion. Males have no vocal sack.

Males aggregate for breeding and form a chorus where they call synchronously. The call resembles that of chickens.

Tadpoles of Gosner stages 33–39 measure 26–33 mm (1.0–1.3 in) in total length. SVL at metamorphosis is about 12 mm (0.5 in).

== Habitat, ecology, and conservation ==
Rana ulma occurs in lowland to montane forests at elevations of 10–350 m (33–1,148 ft) above sea level. During the breeding season that takes place in December, adults congregate around small montane streams. The eggs are deposited in the shallows of headwaters, sometimes in small pools. The egg masses are loose and contain only about ten eggs; the total clutch size is about 320 eggs. Outside the breeding season, this species is terrestrial.

Predators of this frog include the pitviper Ovophis okinavensis, which prey upon breeding adults. Also the frog Limnonectes namiyei is a potential predator.

This species is suffering from habitat loss caused by human settlements. It is not known from protected areas, but the Kume Island population enjoys the status of "a locally protected population".
