= Johns' groove-toed frog =

Conservation status
- Least Concern (IUCN 3.1)

Scientific classification
- Kingdom: Animalia
- Phylum: Chordata
- Class: Amphibia
- Order: Anura
- Family: Ranidae
- Genus: Rana
- Species: R. johnsi

Binomial name
- Rana johnsi Smith, 1921

Synonyms
- Rana sauteri johnsi Smith, 1921

Species of amphibian

Johns' groove-toed frog or Johns' frog (Rana johnsi), is a frog species in the true frog family (Ranidae). It is found in scattered locations in southern China and Vietnam and in the Khammouan Province of Laos, eastern Cambodia, and north-central Thailand. Its natural habitats are subtropical or tropical evergreen forests where it can be found in leaf-litter and on low vegetation near streams. It breeds in paddy fields, at least. It is mostly known from protected areas without other major threats than fires. It is not considered threatened by the IUCN.
