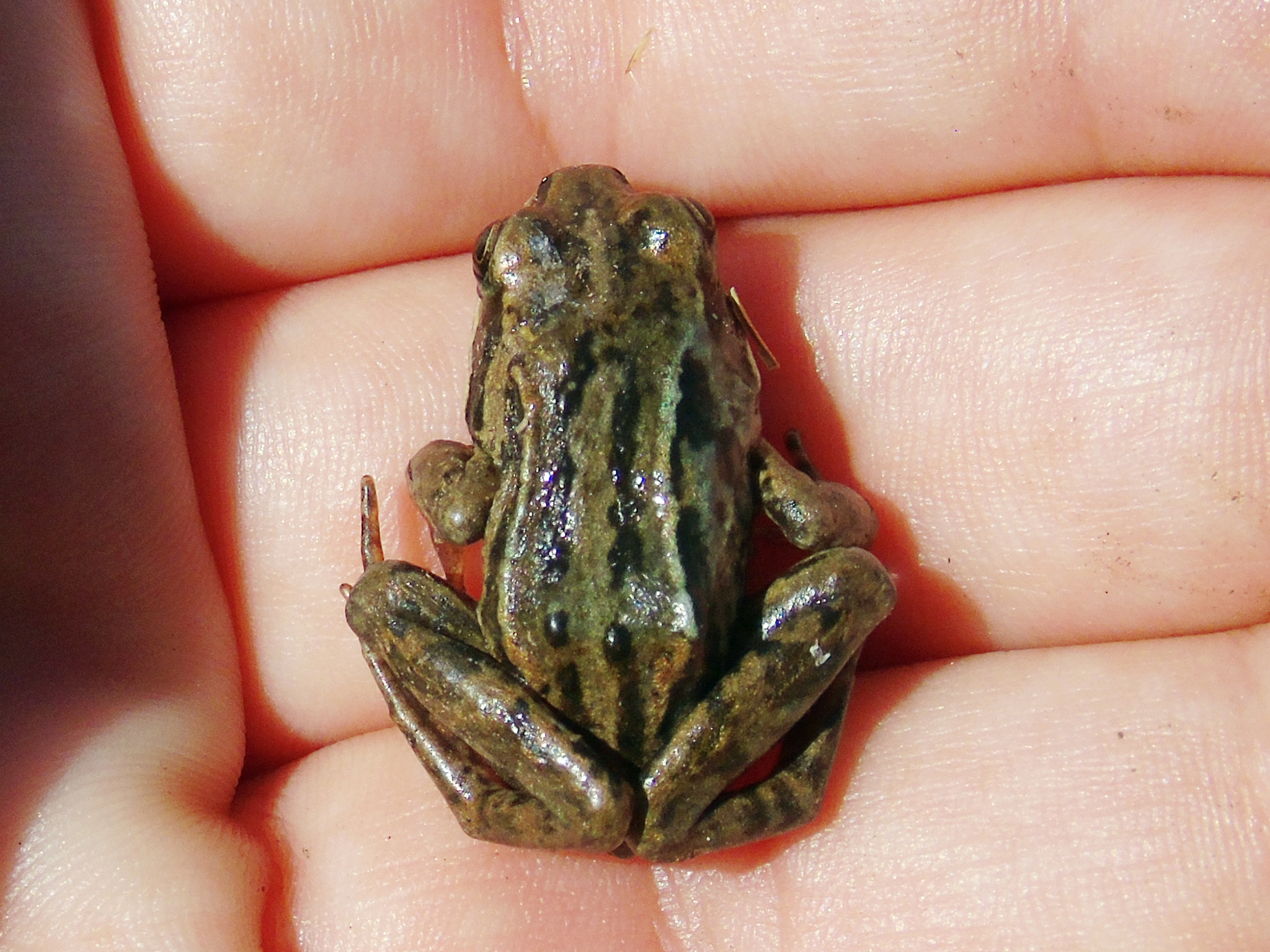
- in Kyrgyzstan

Conservation status
- Vulnerable (IUCN 3.1)

Scientific classification
- Kingdom: Animalia
- Phylum: Chordata
- Class: Amphibia
- Order: Anura
- Family: Ranidae
- Genus: Rana
- Species: R. asiatica

Binomial name
- Rana asiatica Bedriaga, 1898

Synonyms
- Rana bachtyana Kastschenko, 1909; Rana temporaria ssp. asiatica Bedriaga, 1898

= Central Asiatic frog =

Species of amphibian

The Central Asiatic frog (Rana asiatica), or Asian frog, is a species of true frog, found in China, Kazakhstan, and Kyrgyzstan. Its natural habitats are temperate forests, temperate shrubland, temperate grassland, rivers, intermittent rivers, swamps, freshwater lakes, intermittent freshwater lakes, freshwater marshes, intermittent freshwater marshes, freshwater springs, inland deltas, arable land, pastureland, rural gardens, urban areas, water storage areas, ponds, aquaculture ponds, and irrigated land.
