= Sichuan frog =

Conservation status
- Least Concern (IUCN 3.1)

Scientific classification
- Kingdom: Animalia
- Phylum: Chordata
- Class: Amphibia
- Order: Anura
- Family: Ranidae
- Genus: Rana
- Species: R. shuchinae

Binomial name
- Rana shuchinae Liu, 1950

Species of amphibian

The Sichuan frog (Rana shuchinae) is a species of frog in the family Ranidae found in China and possibly Myanmar. Its natural habitats are temperate shrubland, temperate grassland, rivers, intermittent rivers, swamps, freshwater marshes, and intermittent freshwater marshes.

It is found in Zhaojue County in southwestern Sichuan province, and Gongshan, Zhongdian and Deqin counties in northwestern Yunnan province.
