= Rana hanluica =

Conservation status
- Least Concern (IUCN 3.1)

Scientific classification
- Kingdom: Animalia
- Phylum: Chordata
- Class: Amphibia
- Order: Anura
- Family: Ranidae
- Genus: Rana
- Species: R. hanluica

Binomial name
- Rana hanluica Shen, Jiang, and Yang, 2007

Species of frog

Rana hanluica is a species of frog in the family Ranidae, the "true frogs". It is endemic to China and is known from the mountains of southwestern Hunan and northeastern Guizhou. It is locally common.
