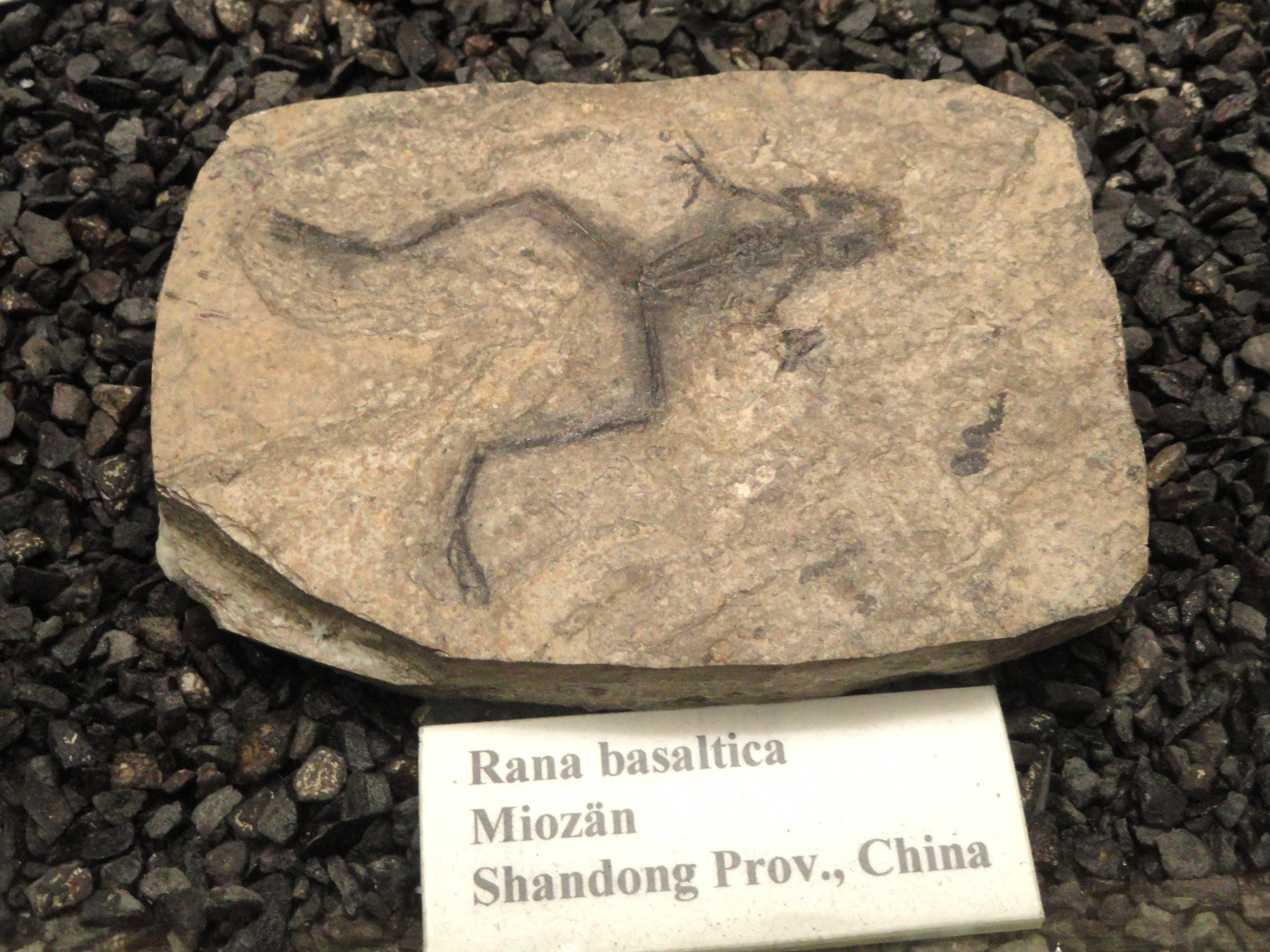
- Fossil

Scientific classification
- Kingdom: Animalia
- Phylum: Chordata
- Class: Amphibia
- Order: Anura
- Family: Ranidae
- Genus: Rana
- Species: †R. basaltica

Binomial name
- †Rana basaltica C.C. Young, 1936

= Rana basaltica =

Rana basaltica Temporal range: Middle Miocene, 15.97–11.608 Ma

Extinct species of amphibian

Rana basaltica is an extinct species of frog from Middle Miocene of China. It is known from the Shanwang formation beds in the Shanwang National Geological Park, Shandong Province, China.

== Taxonomy ==
Rana basaltica was described by C.C. Young in 1936 based on a single specimen. Although not explicitly designated as the holotype, this specimen is the holotype by monotypy. However, no information where it was deposited was given, and the holotype is now considered lost. Moreover, the description was cursory, and the name has even been considered a nomen dubium. Therefore, Roček and colleagues designated a neotype for Rana basaltica in 2011. This specimen (IVPP V11706) originates from the same fossil locality and bed, fits the diagnosis, and is preserved similarly to Young's original specimen.

== Description ==
Rana basaltica measured 29–46 mm (1.1–1.8 in) in snout–vent length. The skull is somewhat shorter than it is wide and is nearly triangular in shape. There are eight procoelous and non-imbricate presacral vertebrae. The hind limbs are comparatively long, with the tibiofibula (fused tibia and fibula) longer than femur, suggesting that this frog was a good jumper.
