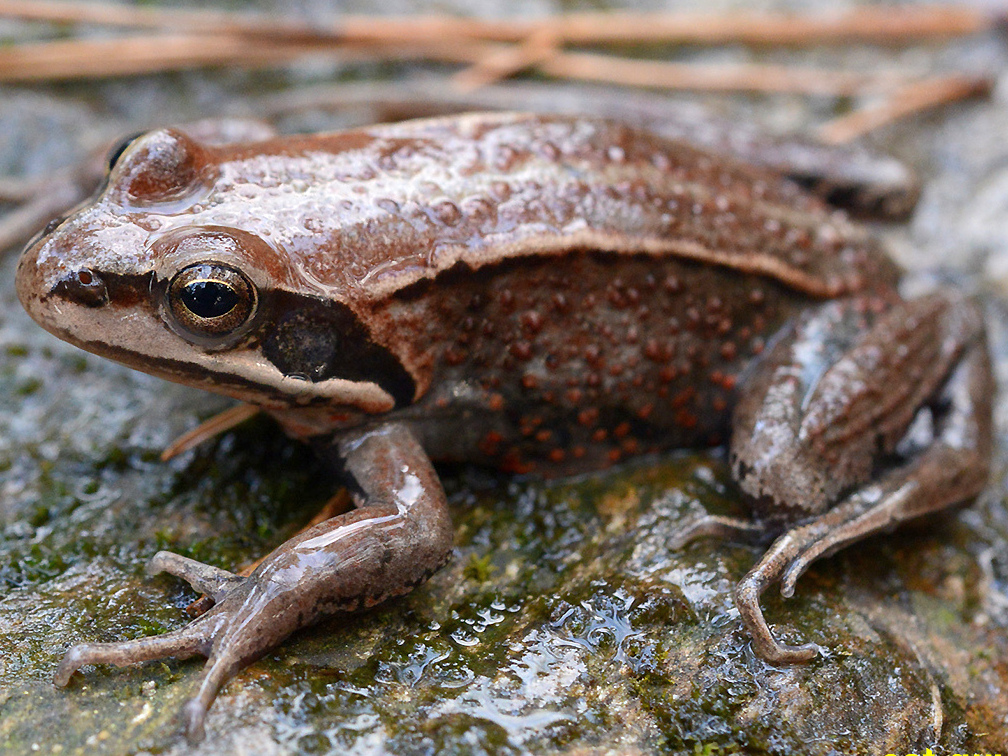

Conservation status
- Least Concern (IUCN 3.1)

Scientific classification
- Kingdom: Animalia
- Phylum: Chordata
- Class: Amphibia
- Order: Anura
- Family: Ranidae
- Genus: Rana
- Species: R. amurensis

Binomial name
- Rana amurensis Boulenger, 1886

= Rana amurensis =

Species of amphibian

Rana amurensis (Khabarovsk frog, Siberian wood frog, Heilongjiang brown frog or Amur brown frog) is a species of true frog found in northern Asia. Rana coreana was previously included in this species as a subspecies.

== Distribution and habitat ==
It ranges across western Siberia, as well as northeastern China, northeastern Mongolia, and on the northern Korean Peninsula and on Sakhalin. Found at latitudes up to 71° N, it is the northernmost wild amphibian species. Favoring lowlands, it is rarely encountered at elevations of more than 600 m. A habitat generalist, Rana amurensis favors open ground, but is also found in both deciduous and coniferous forests. In the winter, it hibernates on pond bottoms.

== Conservation ==
According to the IUCN, the main threat to the species is habitat loss, as it is only mildly tolerant of disturbance. In addition, it has become a frequent subject of hunting in Russia since the 1990s. However, it is not considered threatened on a global scale.

== Description ==
Adults are light brown with smooth skin and irregular dark brown and yellow stripes, with a body length of 2–2.5 cm (0.79–0.98 in).

== Diet and breeding ==
Rana amurensis favors beetles, and consumes 1.2–2.5 g (0.0026–0.0055 lb) of food per day. The average lifespan is three years. Their breeding season is very early, starting in late February in Korea. An egg sac contains 30-60 eggs.

== Gallery ==
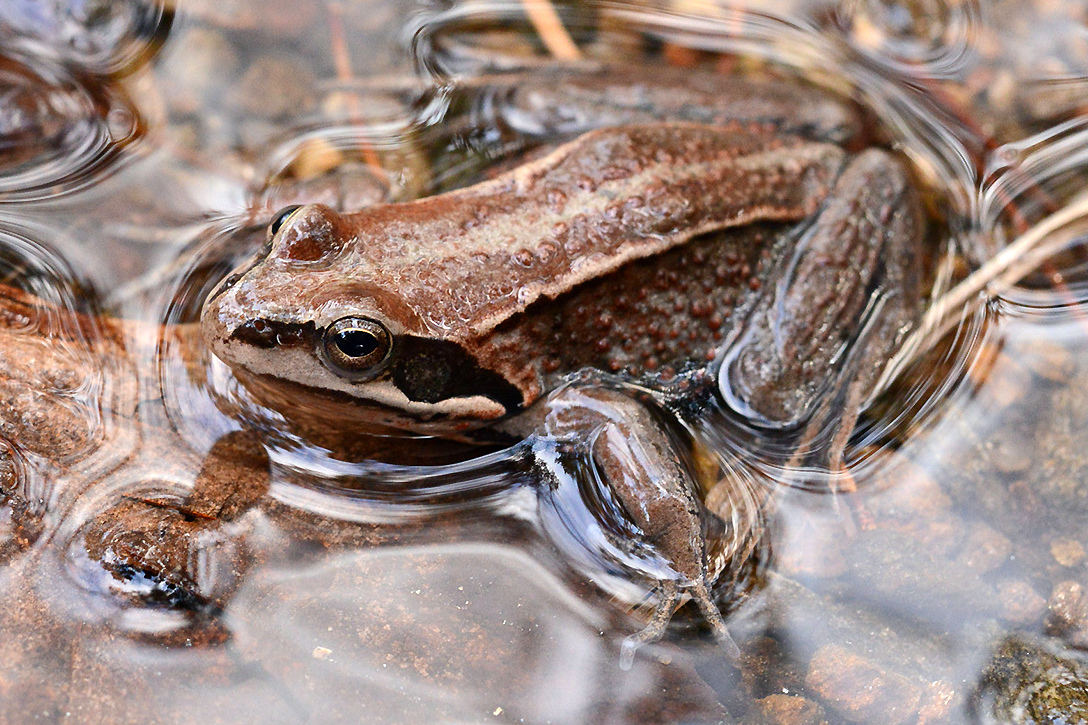
Rana amurensis in water

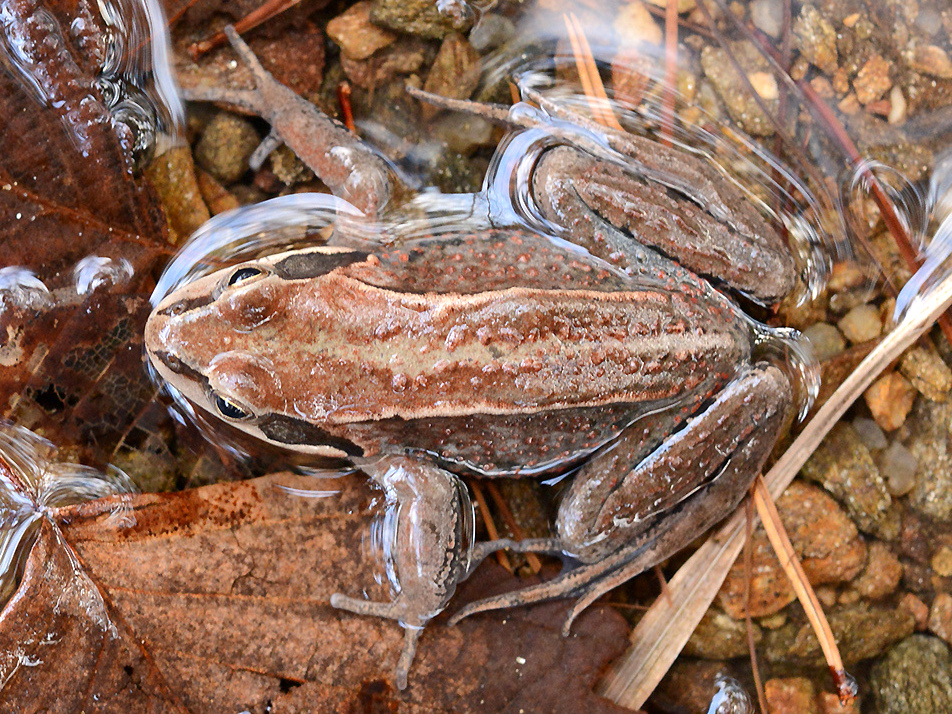
Dorsal view

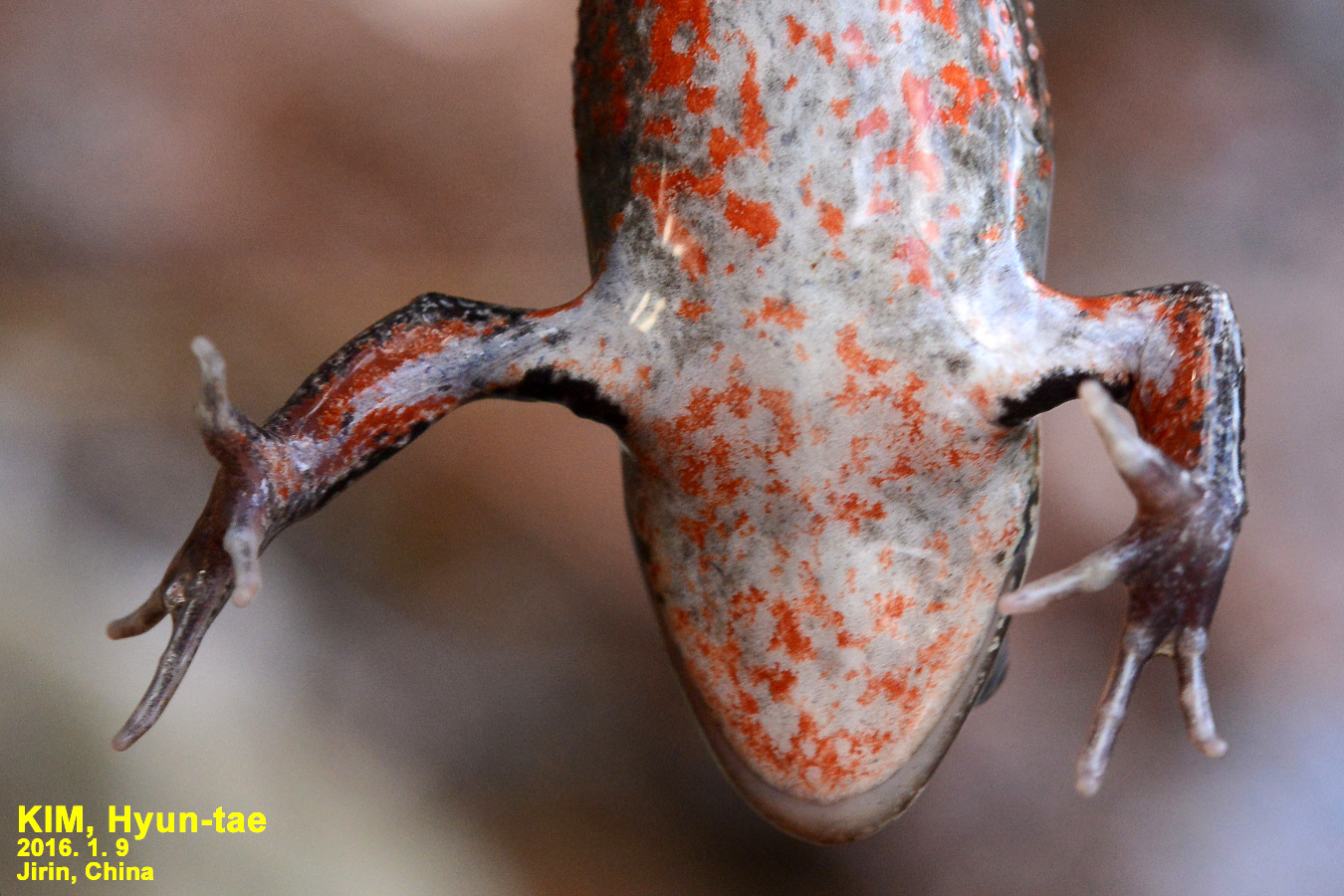
View of underside
