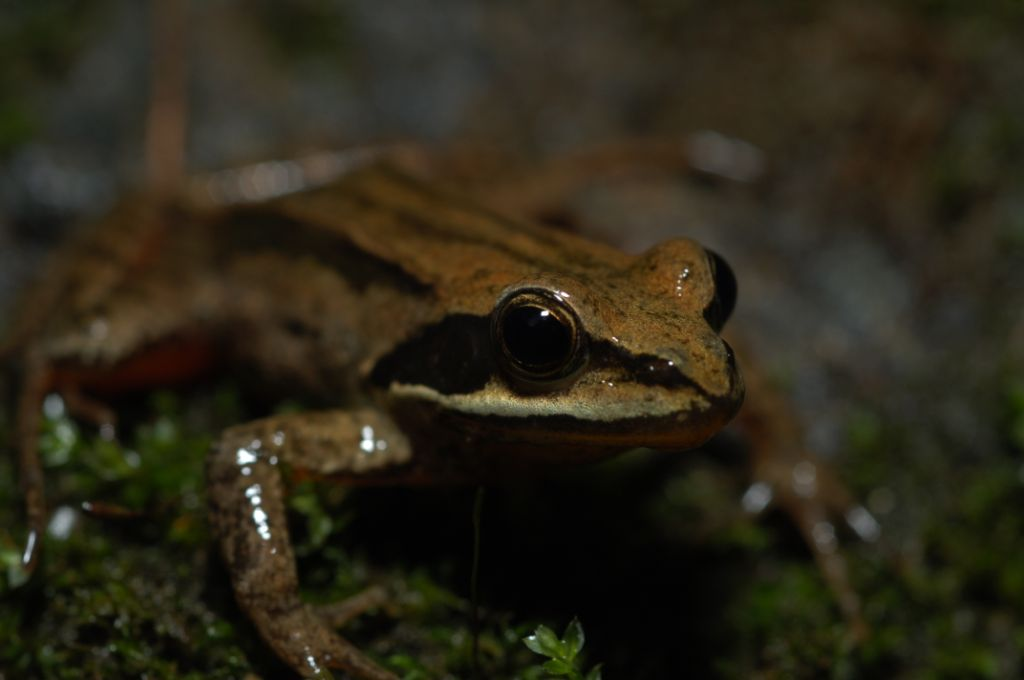

Conservation status
- Least Concern (IUCN 3.1)

Scientific classification
- Kingdom: Animalia
- Phylum: Chordata
- Class: Amphibia
- Order: Anura
- Family: Ranidae
- Genus: Rana
- Species: R. coreana

Binomial name
- Rana coreana Okada, 1928

Synonyms
- Rana temporaria coreana Okada, 1928; Rana amurensis coreana (Okada, 1928); Rana kunyuensis Lu and Li, 2002

= Korean brown frog =

Species of amphibian

The Korean brown frog (Rana coreana) is a species of frog in the genus Rana. It is native to the Korean Peninsula and Shandong, China.

== Taxonomy and systematics ==
The Korean brown frog has earlier mostly been considered as subspecies of Rana amurensis, that is, R. a. coreana. However, morphological and genetic analyses support its status as a distinct species, though closely related to R. amurensis. The boundary between these two species is unclear.

Until recently, Korean brown frog was considered Korean endemic. However, molecular and morphological evidence show Rana kunyuensis from Mount Kunyu in the Shandong province of China is the same species as Korean brown frog and its junior synonym.

== Description ==
It is the smallest of brown frogs in Korea, with males reaching up to 38 mm (1.5 in) and females to 44 mm (1.7 in) in snout-vent length.

== Habitat and conservation ==
The Korean brown frog inhabits coniferous, mixed and deciduous forests, shrublands, and grasslands. Most commonly it occurs in open, wet places (e.g., wet meadows, swamps, riverbanks, floodplains, etc.). They breed in shallow lakes, ponds, ditches, large puddles, and marshes. Hibernating frogs can be found in large numbers in the bottom mud of ponds and pools.

Korean brown frog may be locally threatened by habitat loss, but this common species is not threatened overall.

The now-synonymized Rana kunyuensis has been assessed as "Data Deficient" by the International Union for Conservation of Nature (IUCN).
