= Rana culaiensis =

Conservation status
- Data Deficient (IUCN 3.1)

Scientific classification
- Kingdom: Animalia
- Phylum: Chordata
- Class: Amphibia
- Order: Anura
- Family: Ranidae
- Genus: Rana
- Species: R. culaiensis

Binomial name
- Rana culaiensis Li et al., 2008

Species of amphibian

Rana culaiensis, commonly known as the Culai brown frog, is a species of true frog from Mt. Culai in the Shandong Province, China.

== Description ==
The average SVL in females is 6.2 cm (2.4 in) and 5.36 cm (2.11 in) in males. It looks different than most other taxa in the genus Rana found in China. The frog is reddish brown with inconspicuous bands on the hind legs. The tympana (temples) are black. The underside is cream white, with the legs having a slightly warmer tone.

== Behavior and ecology ==
Rana culaiensis likely breeds from March to April. It is found at an elevation of 630–900 m (2,070–2,950 ft). The specimens were collected from a forest brook, which is likely their habitat. Seemingly, Rana culaiensis is solely distributed on Mt. Culai and nowhere else.

== Etymology ==
The name Rana culaiensis stems from its locality, Mt. Culai.
