= Chevron-spotted brown frog =

Conservation status
- Critically Endangered (IUCN 3.1)

Scientific classification
- Kingdom: Animalia
- Phylum: Chordata
- Class: Amphibia
- Order: Anura
- Family: Ranidae
- Genus: Rana
- Species: R. chevronta

Binomial name
- Rana chevronta Hu & Ye, 1978

Species of amphibian

The chevron-spotted brown frog (Rana chevronta) is a species of frog in the family Ranidae, endemic to Mount Emei, Sichuan, China. Its natural habitats are temperate forests, freshwater marshes, and intermittent freshwater marshes. It is threatened by habitat loss.
