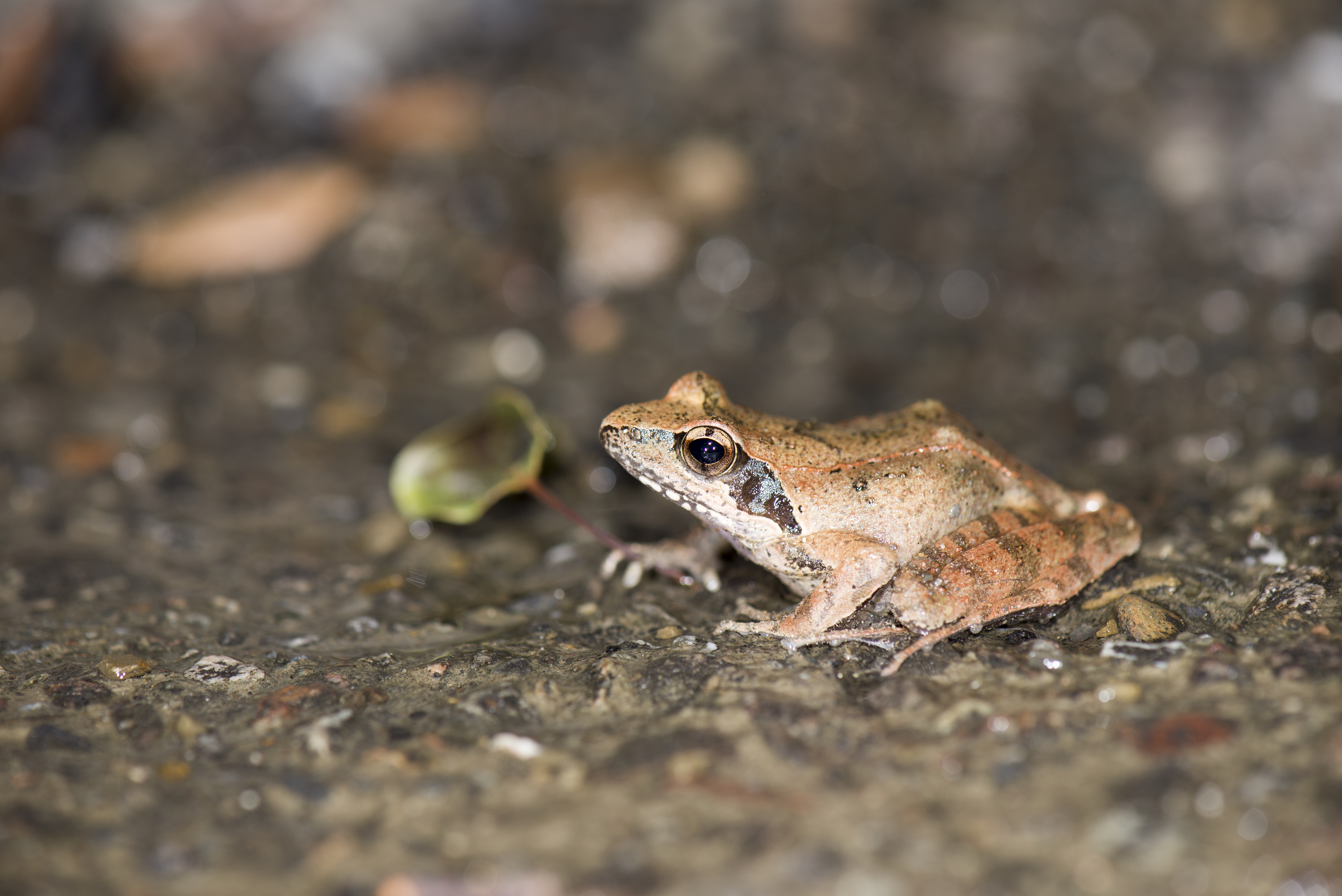

Conservation status
- Vulnerable (IUCN 3.1)

Scientific classification
- Kingdom: Animalia
- Phylum: Chordata
- Class: Amphibia
- Order: Anura
- Family: Ranidae
- Genus: Rana
- Species: R. longicrus

Binomial name
- Rana longicrus Stejneger, 1898

= Rana longicrus =

Species of amphibian

Rana longicrus, also known as the Taipa frog or long-legged brown frog, is a species of frog in the family Ranidae. It is distributed to northern and central Taiwan.

== Description ==
Rana longicrus is a slender-bodied frog with relatively long legs. Males measure 42–56 mm (1.7–2.2 in) and females 58–65 mm (2.3–2.6 in) in snout–vent length.

== Reproduction ==
The breeding season in Aoti, northern Taiwan, is from November to March. The smallest mature male measured 33 mm (1.3 in) SVL and smallest gravid female 32 mm (1.3 in) SVL. Both sexes appear to reach this size by the end of their first year. Peak breeding occurred in December but is probably influenced by rain. Egg clutches of 600–2,000 eggs are laid in water. Metamorphosis occurs after about two months. However, survival to metamorphosis is low because of disturbance by human activities (plowing of ricefields) and by the desiccation.

== Diet ==
Rana longicrus feed primarily on arachnids and insect larvae and adults (often ants or beetles). In winter when they spend more time near water also crustaceans are eaten.

== Habitat and conservation ==
Rana longicrus occurs in subtropical broad-leaf forests as well as cultivated fields below 1,000 m (3,300 ft) elevation. Breeding takes place in marshes, pools, and ponds. It is threatened by habitat loss, in particular due to infrastructure development, but also pollution. It is currently protected in the Yangmingshan National Park.
