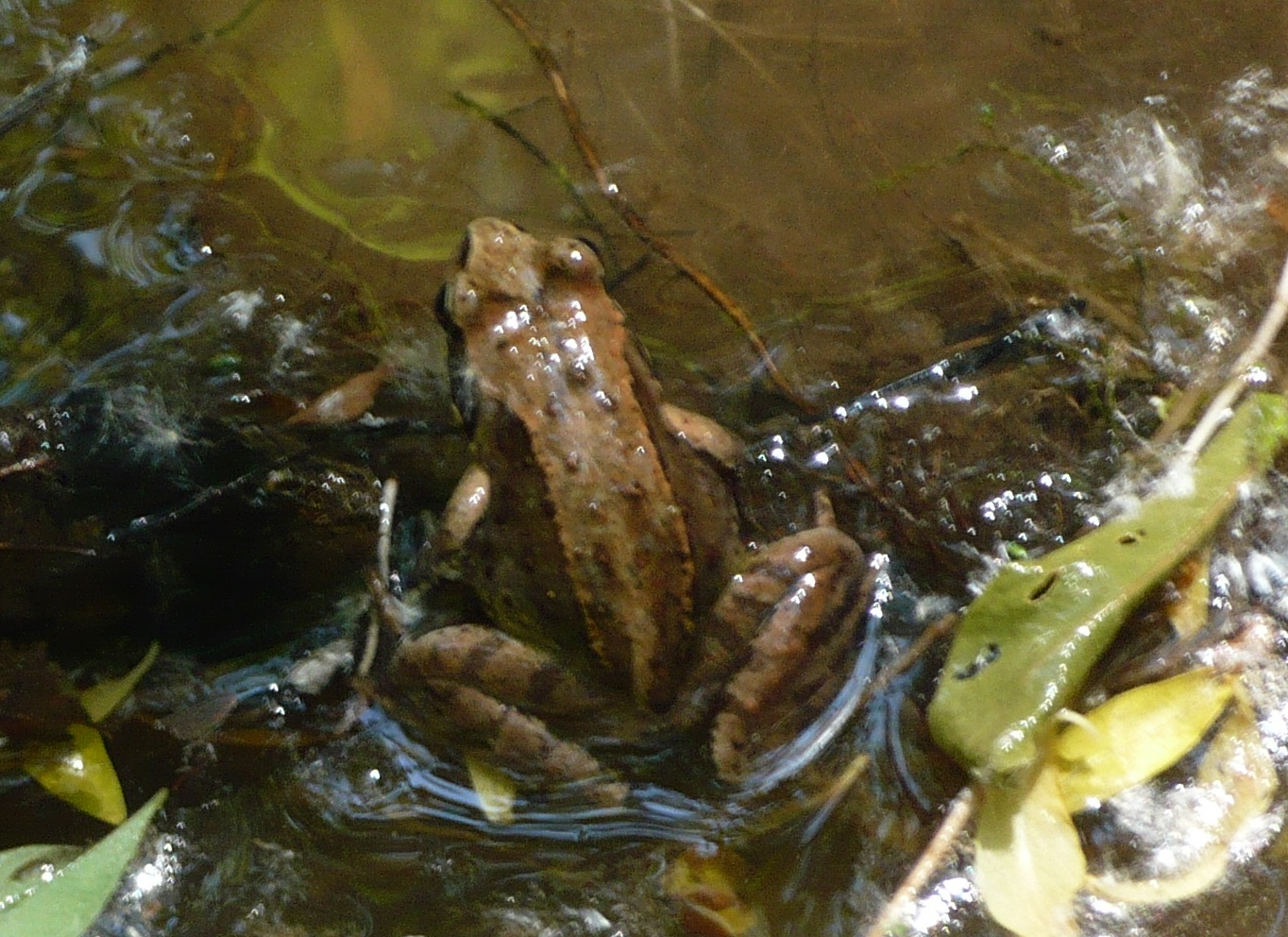

Conservation status
- Least Concern (IUCN 3.1)

Scientific classification
- Kingdom: Animalia
- Phylum: Chordata
- Class: Amphibia
- Order: Anura
- Family: Ranidae
- Genus: Rana
- Species: R. pirica

Binomial name
- Rana pirica Matsui, 1991

= Hokkaidō frog =

Species of amphibian

The Hokkaidō frog or the Ezo brown frog (Rana pirica) is a species in the family Ranidae found in Hokkaidō, Japan, and Sakhalin, Russia. Its natural habitats are boreal forests, temperate forests, temperate shrubland, temperate grassland, rivers, swamps, intermittent freshwater lakes, freshwater marshes, intermittent freshwater marshes, arable land, ponds, and irrigated land.
