= Rana jiemuxiensis =

Conservation status
- Data Deficient (IUCN 3.1)

Scientific classification
- Kingdom: Animalia
- Phylum: Chordata
- Class: Amphibia
- Order: Anura
- Family: Ranidae
- Genus: Rana
- Species: R. jiemuxiensis

Binomial name
- Rana jiemuxiensis Yan, et al., 2011

Species of frog

Rana jiemuxiensis, commonly known as the Jiemuxi brown frog, is a species of "true frog", family Ranidae. It was discovered through genetic analysis and their different mating season (winter) found in Jiemuxi in Yuanling County, China.

== Description ==
The snout–vent length is within the range of 3.4–5.4 cm (1.3–2.1 in). It is reddish brown to grayish brown with black irregular spots. The legs have dark bands. The underside is white with some small dark spots. They do display sexual dimorphism in various ways. The tympana (temples) are darker than the rest of the body in both genders.

== Etymology ==
The specific name jiemuxiensis refers to the type locality, which was in Jiemuxi, Hunan.
