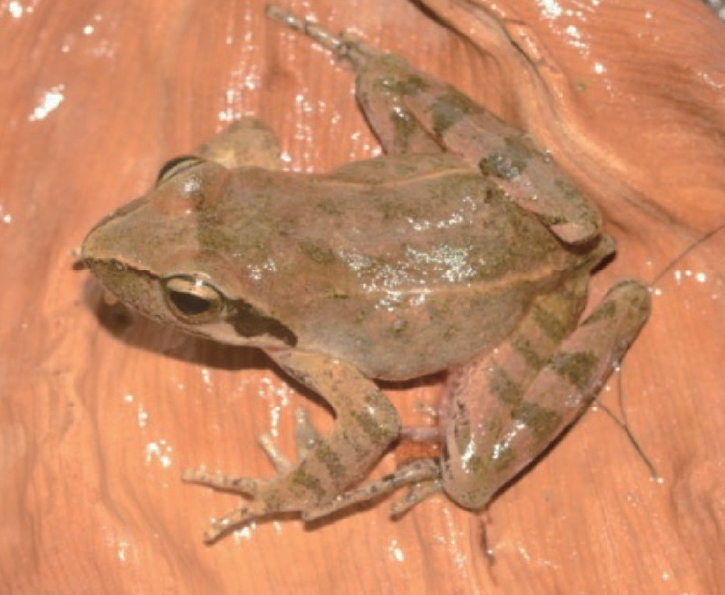
- A live individual of Rana luanchuanensisw

Conservation status
- Data Deficient (IUCN 3.1)

Scientific classification
- Kingdom: Animalia
- Phylum: Chordata
- Class: Amphibia
- Order: Anura
- Family: Ranidae
- Genus: Rana
- Species: R. luanchuanensis

Binomial name
- Rana luanchuanensis Zhao & Yuan, 2017
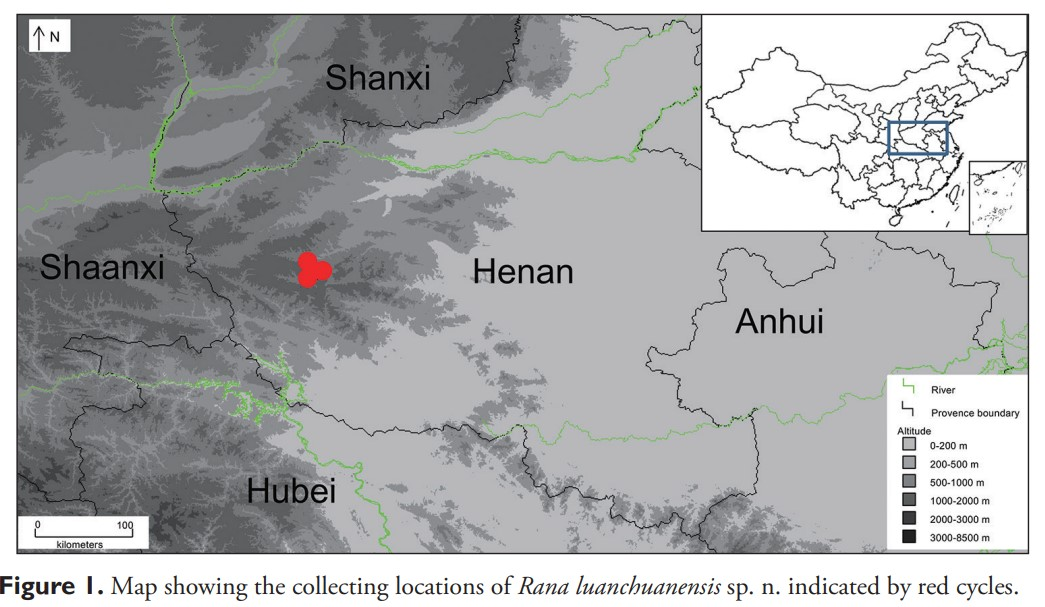
- Distribution shown by red dot

= Rana luanchuanensis =

Species of true frog

Rana luanchuanensis is a species of true frog discovered in Luanchuan County, China, through morphometric and genetic analysis.

== Description ==
From the 38 examined specimens, it was found that the SVL was 2.72–3.3 cm (1.07–1.30 in) in males and 2.37–4.12 cm (0.93–1.62 in) in females. The frog is reddish brown with dark bands on its limbs. There is a thin stripe going from the tip of the snout, across the eyes, and into the dark blotch on the tympana (temples). The underside is white, except for the reddish fore- and hindlimbs and the posterior part of the belly.

== Distribution and ecology ==
Rana luanchuanensis is found in Luanchan County in Henan, China. All specimens were collected near mountains in slow-flowing streams with rocky beds in forested areas. They are thought to breed during the winter, but more research needs to be done.

== Etymology ==
The name Rana luanchuanensis stems from where the specimens were collected (their type locality) in Luanchuan County.
