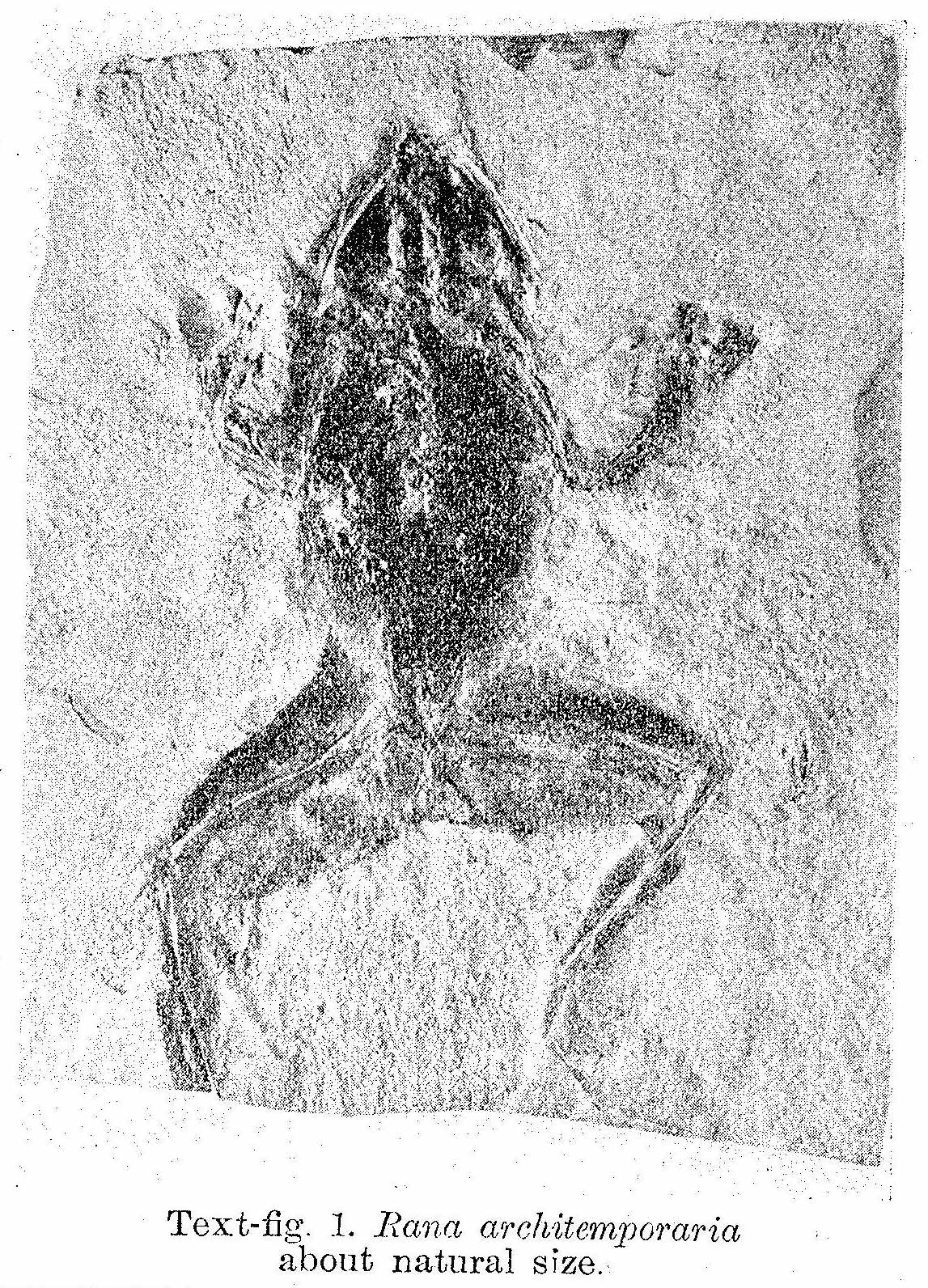
- The original specimen that was used to describe the species in 1937

Scientific classification
- Kingdom: Animalia
- Phylum: Chordata
- Class: Amphibia
- Order: Anura
- Family: Ranidae
- Genus: Rana
- Species: †R. architemporaria

Binomial name
- †Rana architemporaria Okada, 1937

= Rana architemporaria =

Rana architemporaria Temporal range: Pliocene

Extinct species of amphibian

Rana architemporaria is an extinct species of true frog from the Pliocene that was found in Kabutoiwa, near the Arafune volcano, Central Japan. It was found at an altitude of 1200 meters. The species was described from a single specimen, but another specimen of Rana architemporaria may also have been found later in 1980, though it was not deemed a definitive ID. This specimen was also dated to around the Pliocene.

== Etymology ==
The author of Rana architemporaria was comparing it to Rana temporaria, the European common brown frog and observed some key differences such as a shorter skull and limbs. However, they were very similar and because of this, he named it Rana architemporaria. "Archi-" as a prefix could mean "first" in the context of Rana architemporaria.
