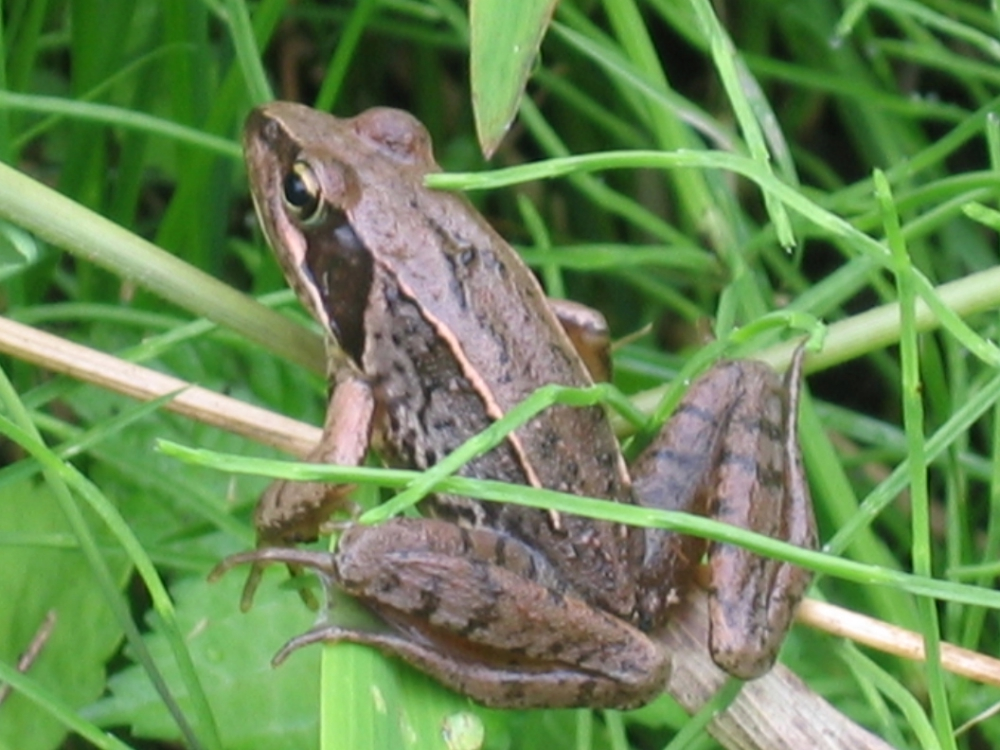

Conservation status
- Least Concern (IUCN 3.1)

Scientific classification
- Kingdom: Animalia
- Phylum: Chordata
- Class: Amphibia
- Order: Anura
- Family: Ranidae
- Genus: Rana
- Species: R. japonica

Binomial name
- Rana japonica Boulenger, 1879

= Japanese brown frog =

Species of amphibian

The Japanese brown frog (Rana japonica) is a species of frog in the family Ranidae, endemic to Japan. Its natural habitats are temperate grassland, rivers, swamps, irrigated land, and seasonally flooded agricultural land.

== Characteristics ==
Defining characteristics include a slender, reddish-brown body with a long, narrow head. The average snout-vent length is 48 mm (0.157 ft) for males. Females are usually much larger than males, with lengths of about 54 mm (0.177 ft). Neither gender has a vocal sac, but males develop yellowish-brown nuptial pads and sing during mating season (which lasts from January to March). Songs consist of 10 to 20 notes.

== Habitat ==
R. japonica occurs in Honshu, Shikoku, and Kyushu in Japan to the southern region of China. Within Japan, it inhabits mostly hillsides and plains and is rarely seen in mountain ranges. More specifically, the brown frog resides in temperate grasslands, hillsides, plains, rivers, swamps, irrigated land, and seasonally flooded agricultural land.

== Translucent breed ==
By combining two types of recessive genes that cause frogs to become translucent, a breed of Rana japonica, popularly called "see-through frogs", was produced by Japanese scientists in 2007 to see the frog's organs, blood cells, and eggs without dissection. The skin is not clear, but translucent. Cancer growths can be seen more easily.

== Predators ==
Tadpole larvae of R. japonica are known to be consumed by aquatic larvae of the Ezo salamander, Hynobius retardatus.

== See also ==
- European frog
