= Rana tavasensis =

Conservation status
- Endangered (IUCN 3.1)

Scientific classification
- Kingdom: Animalia
- Phylum: Chordata
- Class: Amphibia
- Order: Anura
- Family: Ranidae
- Genus: Rana
- Species: R. tavasensis

Binomial name
- Rana tavasensis Baran and Atatür, 1986

Species of frog

Rana tavasensis is a species of frog in the family Ranidae. It is endemic to southwestern Turkey. Common name Tava frog has been proposed for it.

== Habitat and ecology ==
Rana tavasensis occurs near streams in wooded areas of cedar and pine trees. It is threatened by loss of forest habitats and by pollution and drainage of wetlands and breeding sites. It has carnivorous feeding habits, and its diet includes crustaceans, insects, arachnids, and gastropods.
