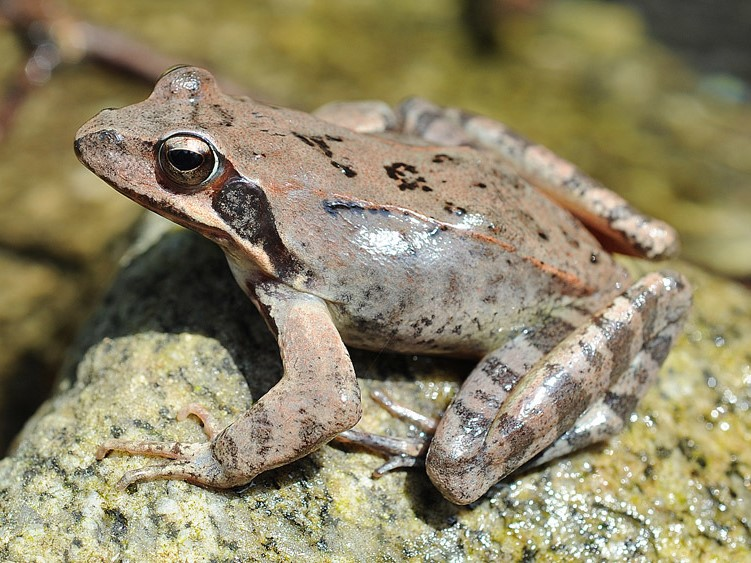

Conservation status
- Least Concern (IUCN 3.1)

Scientific classification
- Kingdom: Animalia
- Phylum: Chordata
- Class: Amphibia
- Order: Anura
- Family: Ranidae
- Genus: Rana
- Species: R. uenoi

Binomial name
- Rana uenoi Matsui, 2014

= Rana uenoi =

Species of frog

Rana uenoi is a species of true frog that was discovered in 2014 using mtDNA and comparative morphology etc. to distinguish it from its previously designated species, Dybowski's frog.

== Range ==
This frog is found in wooded areas in the Korean Peninsula (it is very likely found in North Korea but the evidence is incomplete) and the nearby islands. It is also found on Tsushima Island, Japan.

== Description ==
Males are smaller than females and grow to around 5–6.2 cm (2.0–2.4 in) SVL, while females grow to around 6–7.6 cm (2.4–3.0 in) SVL. They are brown with striped legs and dark "temples" called tympana. They sometimes have black dots on their back. The abdomen is white and gets yellowish closer to the posterior end. Many small details distinguish R. uenoi from Dybowski's frog e.g. R. uenoi has longer hindlimbs.

== Etymology ==
Rana uenoi is named after Dr. Shun-ichi Uéno, a Japanese entomologist.
