= Rana omeimontis =

Omei brown frog

Conservation status
- Least Concern (IUCN 3.1)

Scientific classification
- Kingdom: Animalia
- Phylum: Chordata
- Class: Amphibia
- Order: Anura
- Family: Ranidae
- Genus: Rana
- Species: R. omeimontis

Binomial name
- Rana omeimontis Ye & Fei, 1993

Species of frog

The Omei brown frog or Omei wood frog (Rana omeimontis) is a species of frog in the family Ranidae. It is endemic to central China (Sichuan, Chongqing, southwestern Hubei, Guizhou, and western Hunan). Its name refers to Mount Emei, its type locality. Its natural habitats are hill forests and grass clumps in forests. Breeding occurs in late summer and the tadpoles overwinter; the breeding habitat is standing water (ponds, pools, flooded fields, and backwaters of small streams). It is not considered threatened by the IUCN.

Female frogs reach a length of 67 mm (2.6 in), males are slightly smaller.
