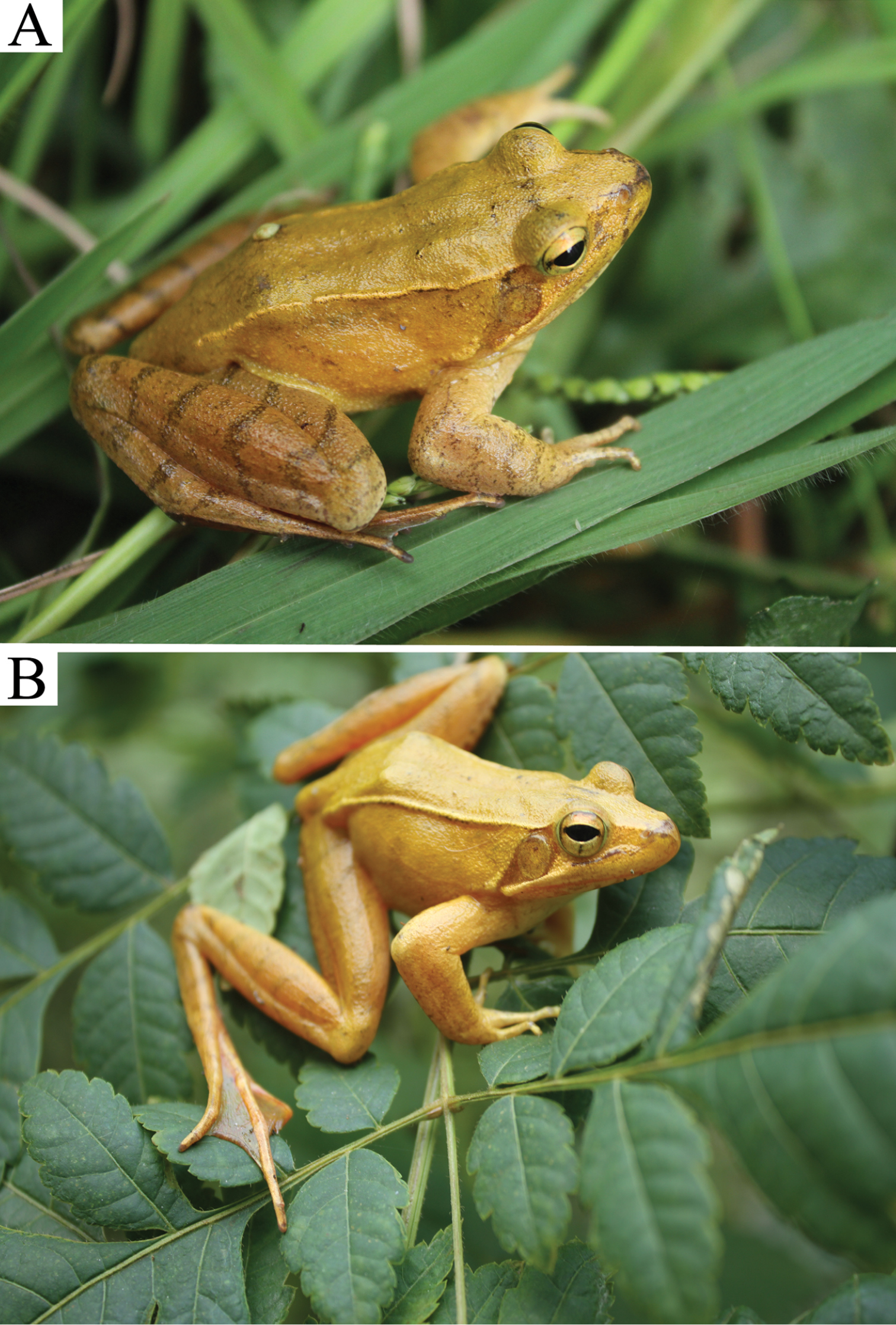
- Pictures of the holotype

Conservation status
- Data Deficient (IUCN 3.1)

Scientific classification
- Kingdom: Animalia
- Phylum: Chordata
- Class: Amphibia
- Order: Anura
- Family: Ranidae
- Genus: Rana
- Species: R. dabieshanensis

Binomial name
- Rana dabieshanensis Wang, 2017
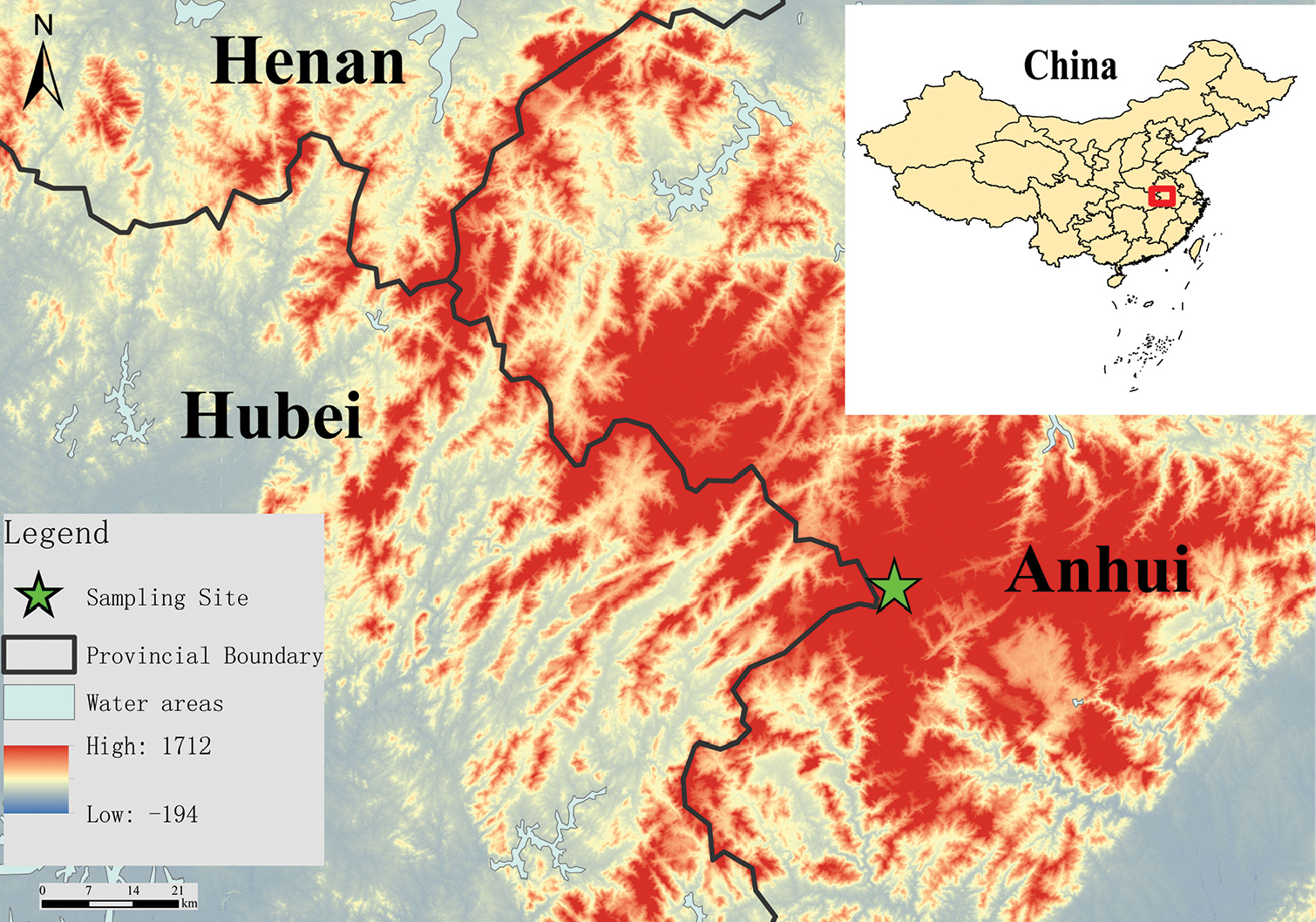
- Specimens collected at the green star

= Rana dabieshanensis =

Species of frog

Rana dabieshanensis is a species of true frog that was discovered in the Dabie Mountains in Anhui, China through genetic analysis and morphology.

== Description ==
It is a somewhat large, golden to light brown frog. The SVL in female specimens was between 5.3 and 6.83 cm (2.09 and 2.69 in) however, only 2 female specimens were measured. The SVL in the 8 measured males was between 50.9 and 62.8 cm (20.0 and 24.7 in). The tympanum is slightly darker than the rest of the frog. The dorsolateral folds (the lines from the back of the eye towards the posterior end) are obvious. Thin, inconspicuous bands can be found on the legs. The coloration of the dorsal side (the back) is dependent on the environment. The belly is white and has some small black spots.

== Distribution and ecology ==
The specimens were collected at an elevation of 1150 meters above sea level. Most specimens were caught at night sitting in grass near a body of water. The humidity was between 62 and 81%. Rana dabieshanensis may also be found elsewhere in the Dabie Mountains.

== Etymology ==
The researchers suggested the common name Dabie Mountain brown frog. The name Rana dabieshanensis stems from where it was found (its type locality) which was in the Dabie mountains. The Dabie Mountains are also known as Dabie Shan. Adding -ensis may mean that the species is named after a location.
