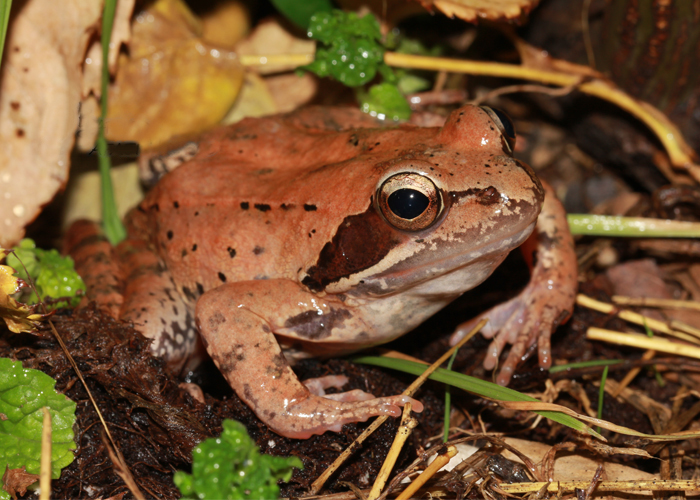

Conservation status
- Least Concern (IUCN 3.1)

Scientific classification
- Kingdom: Animalia
- Phylum: Chordata
- Class: Amphibia
- Order: Anura
- Family: Ranidae
- Genus: Rana
- Species: R. pseudodalmatina

Binomial name
- Rana pseudodalmatina Eiselt & Schmidtler, 1971

= Rana pseudodalmatina =

Species of frog

Rana pseudodalmatina is a species of frog in the family Ranidae endemic to Hyrcanian forests in Iran and Azerbaijan. Since 5 July 2019, the Hyrcanian Forests have been designated a UNESCO World Heritage Site.

Its natural habitats are temperate forests, temperate grassland, and rivers.
