= Rana strausi =

Rana strausi Temporal range: Late Pliocene

Scientific classification
- Kingdom: Animalia
- Phylum: Chordata
- Class: Amphibia
- Order: Anura
- Family: Ranidae
- Genus: Rana
- Species: †R. strausi

Binomial name
- †Rana strausi Špinar, 1980

Extinct species of amphibians

Rana strausi is an extinct species of true frog from the late Pliocene discovered in Willershausen, Germany.

== Description ==
There was only one holotype, but the author used 6 specimens to get an accurate description. It has a relatively small skull relative to the body. The skull is also around 0,5 cm wider than it is long and ends in a somewhat pointy snout. It has a long spine consisting of 9 relatively long vertebrae. Males and females can be distinguished by the width of the pelvis; males have narrower pelvises than females. Some of the soft tissue has been preserved, including some pigmentation. The hindlimbs have dark, horizontal stripes; 5 stripes on the thigh and 4 on the calf.

The eggs appeared pigmented and oval. However, the oval shape is likely caused by deformation, as a similar species (Common frog) produces round eggs.

== Etymology ==
Rana strausi is named after Dr. Adolf Straus because he, according to Špinar (the author), significantly helped expand the knowledge about fossils from the fossil-rich clay pit in Willershausen.
