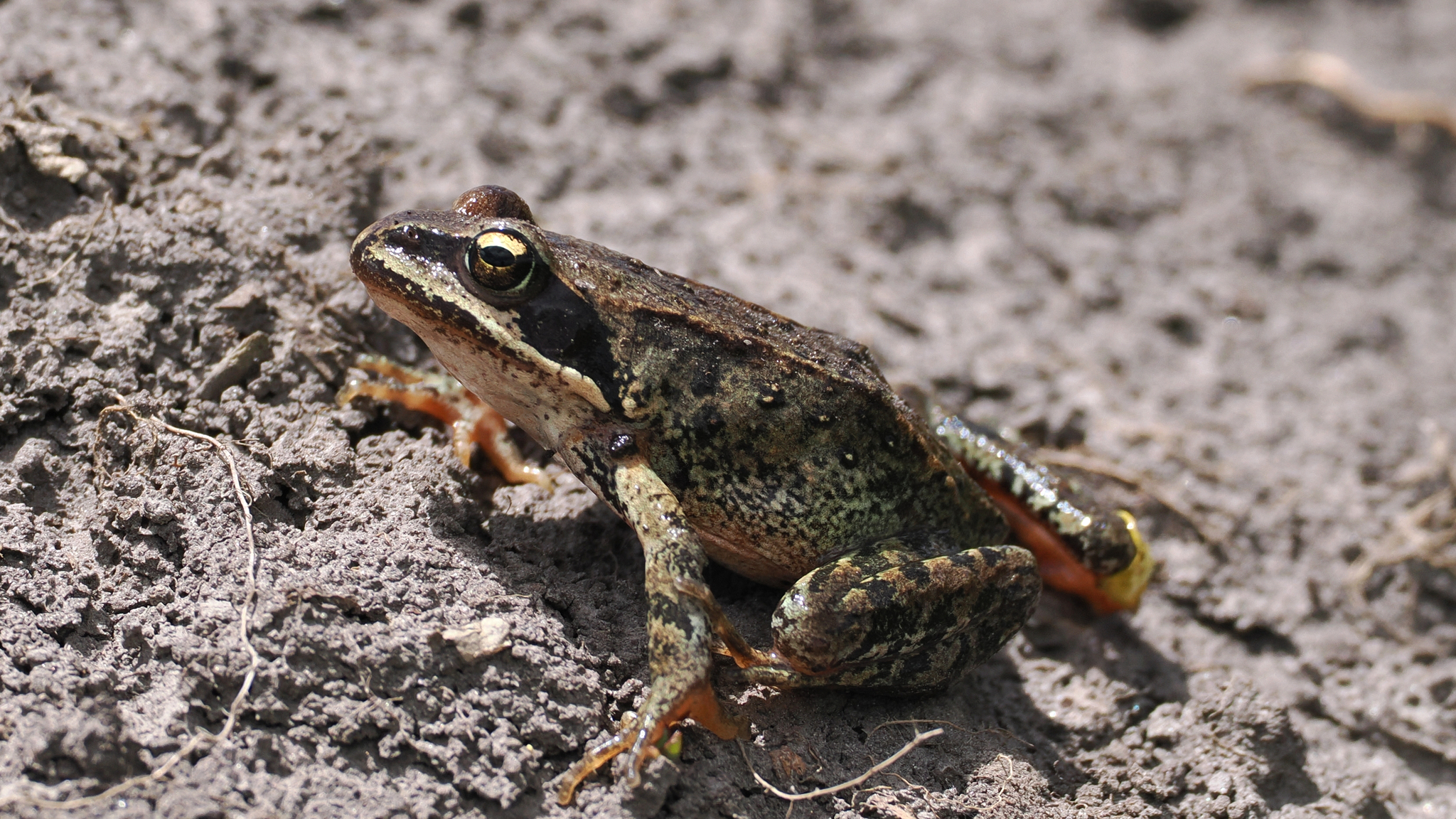

Conservation status
- Least Concern (IUCN 3.1)

Scientific classification
- Kingdom: Animalia
- Phylum: Chordata
- Class: Amphibia
- Order: Anura
- Family: Ranidae
- Genus: Rana
- Species: R. kukunoris

Binomial name
- Rana kukunoris Nikolskii, 1918

Synonyms
- Rana amurensis ssp. kukunoris Nikolskii, 1918

= Plateau brown frog =

Species of amphibian

The plateau brown frog or plateau wood frog (Rana kukunoris) is a species of frog in the family Ranidae, endemic to the plateau region of western China (northwestern Sichuan, eastern Qinghai, Gansu, and very northeastern Tibet). It was previously included in Rana chensinensis but it now considered a valid species. It is a common frog in suitable habitats that include alpine meadows, marshland and grassland. It hibernates in streams. It is not considered threatened by the IUCN.
