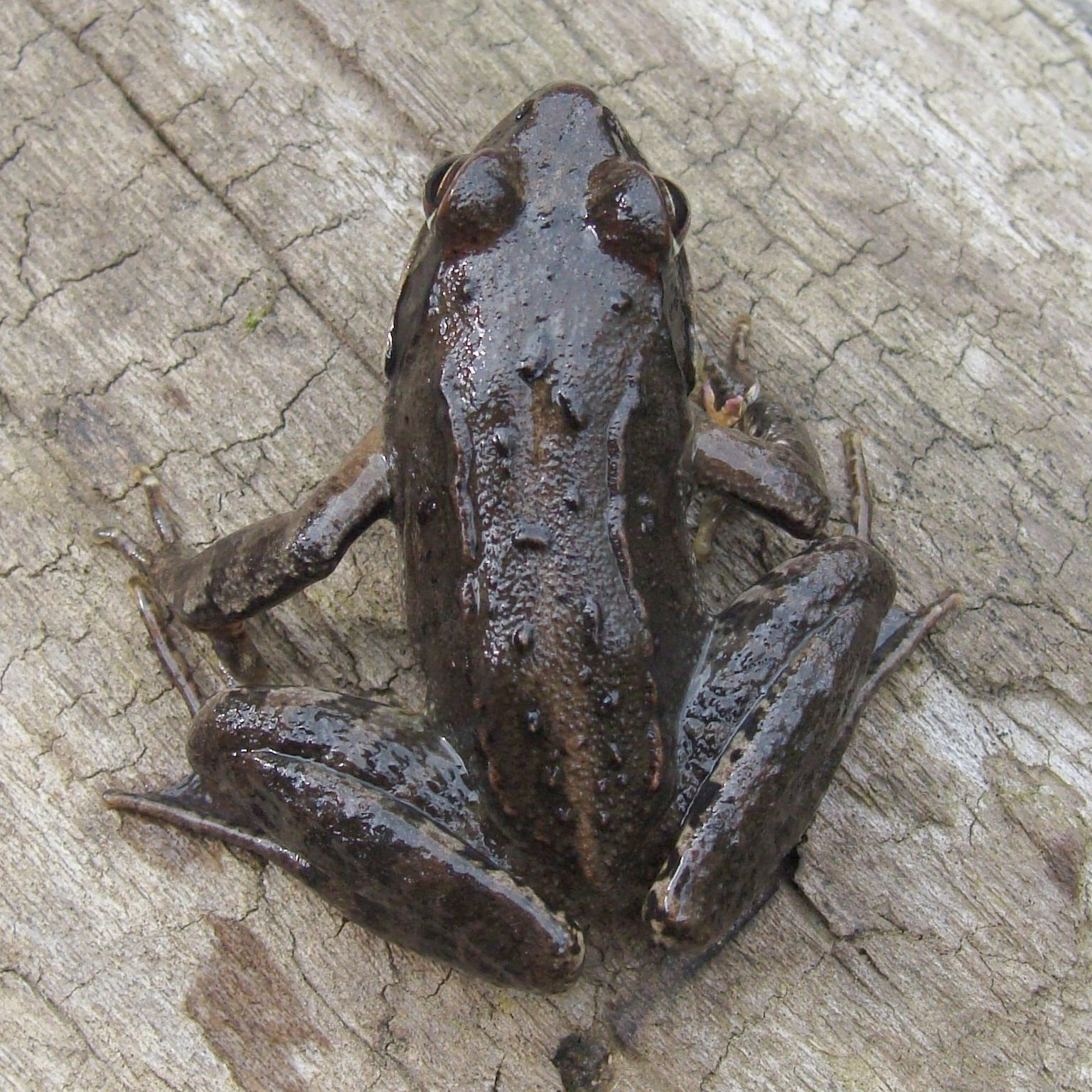

Conservation status
- Least Concern (IUCN 3.1)

Scientific classification
- Kingdom: Animalia
- Phylum: Chordata
- Class: Amphibia
- Order: Anura
- Family: Ranidae
- Genus: Rana
- Species: R. ornativentris

Binomial name
- Rana ornativentris Werner, 1903

= Montane brown frog =

Species of amphibian

The montane brown frog or Nikkō frog (Rana ornativentris) is a species of frog in the family Ranidae. It is endemic to Japan.

Its natural habitats are subtropical or tropical dry forests, rivers, swamps, freshwater marshes, arable land, irrigated land, and seasonally flooded agricultural land.
