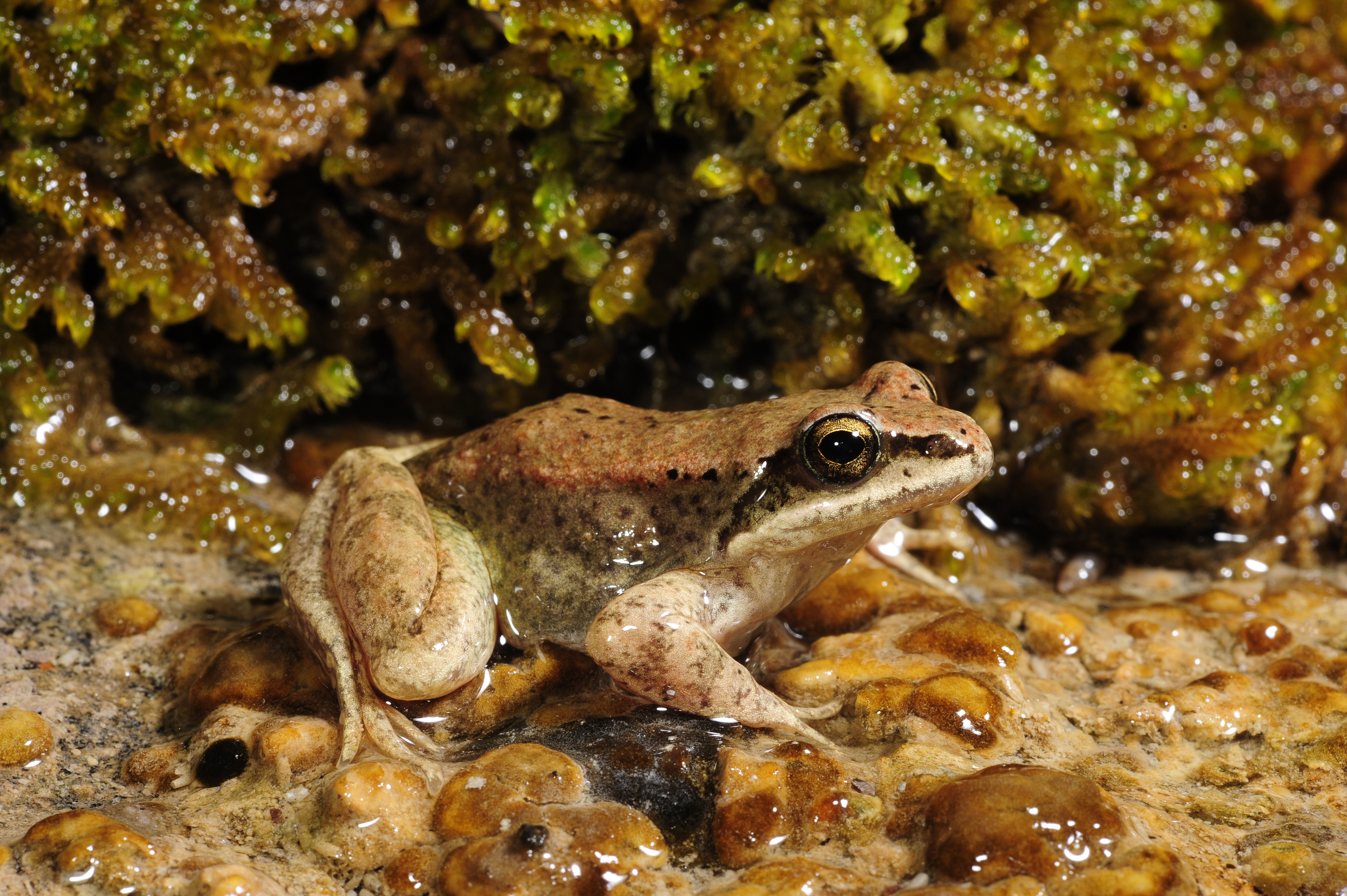

Conservation status
- Endangered (IUCN 3.1)

Scientific classification
- Kingdom: Animalia
- Phylum: Chordata
- Class: Amphibia
- Order: Anura
- Family: Ranidae
- Genus: Rana
- Species: R. pyrenaica

Binomial name
- Rana pyrenaica Serra-Cobo, 1993

= Pyrenean frog =

Species of amphibian

The Pyrenean frog or Pyrenees frog (Rana pyrenaica) is a species of frogs in the family Ranidae found in the Pyrenees mountains of France and Spain. Its natural habitats are fast-moving mountain streams and their surroundings. The IUCN lists it as "endangered".

== Description ==
The Pyrenean frog is the smallest species of brown frog in Europe, with adults reaching a snout-to-vent length of about 33 to 45 mm (1.3 to 1.8 in), females being slightly larger than males. The snout is blunt and rounded and the nostrils are more widely separated than are the eye bulges. The tympani are small and not always visible and the dorso-lateral folds are fairly close together. The hind feet are completely webbed apart from the tip of the fourth toe. This frog is creamy-brown, buff, greyish-brown, reddish-brown or olive-grey with rather indistinct blotches of greenish-brown or brown. The hind legs are faintly barred. The upper lip is often noticeably pale and the throat and underparts are whitish with the belly sometimes flushed with yellow or pink, especially under the thighs. It differs from the common frog (Rana temporaria) by being smaller, having a less-pointed snout and less-distinct markings.

== Distribution and habitat ==
The Pyrenean frog is endemic to the Pyrenees with most populations being on the Spanish slopes at altitudes between about 1,000 and 1,800 m (3,300 and 5,900 ft). Its range extends from the Ordesa y Monte Perdido National Park to the Roncal Valley in the Navarre region. It is also present in limited numbers on the French side of the mountains. It is found in and around fast-moving, rocky streams with little vegetation, sharing this habitat with the Pyrenean brook salamander (Calotriton asper). It avoids still water ponds and lakes.

== Behaviour ==
Adult Pyrenean frogs spend much of their time in the fast-flowing rocky streams and torrents near which they live, but juveniles are more terrestrial. The frogs are timid and escape from danger by diving into water and hiding in crevices and under stones. They hibernate in the winter but are active during both day and night between about February and July. Breeding takes place after the snow has melted, the female laying batches of jelly-covered eggs (totalling up to 150) under stones, in crevices or on the bed of a stream.

== Status ==
The International Union for Conservation of Nature lists the Pyrenean frog as being an "endangered species". This is because its numbers are decreasing, its total area of occupancy is less than 5,000 square kilometres (1,900 sq mi) and even within this range, its populations are fragmented. Threats it faces include alteration to its habitat through the intensification of agricultural practices, disturbance from increased tourism, the introduction of non-native fish and possibly climate change.
