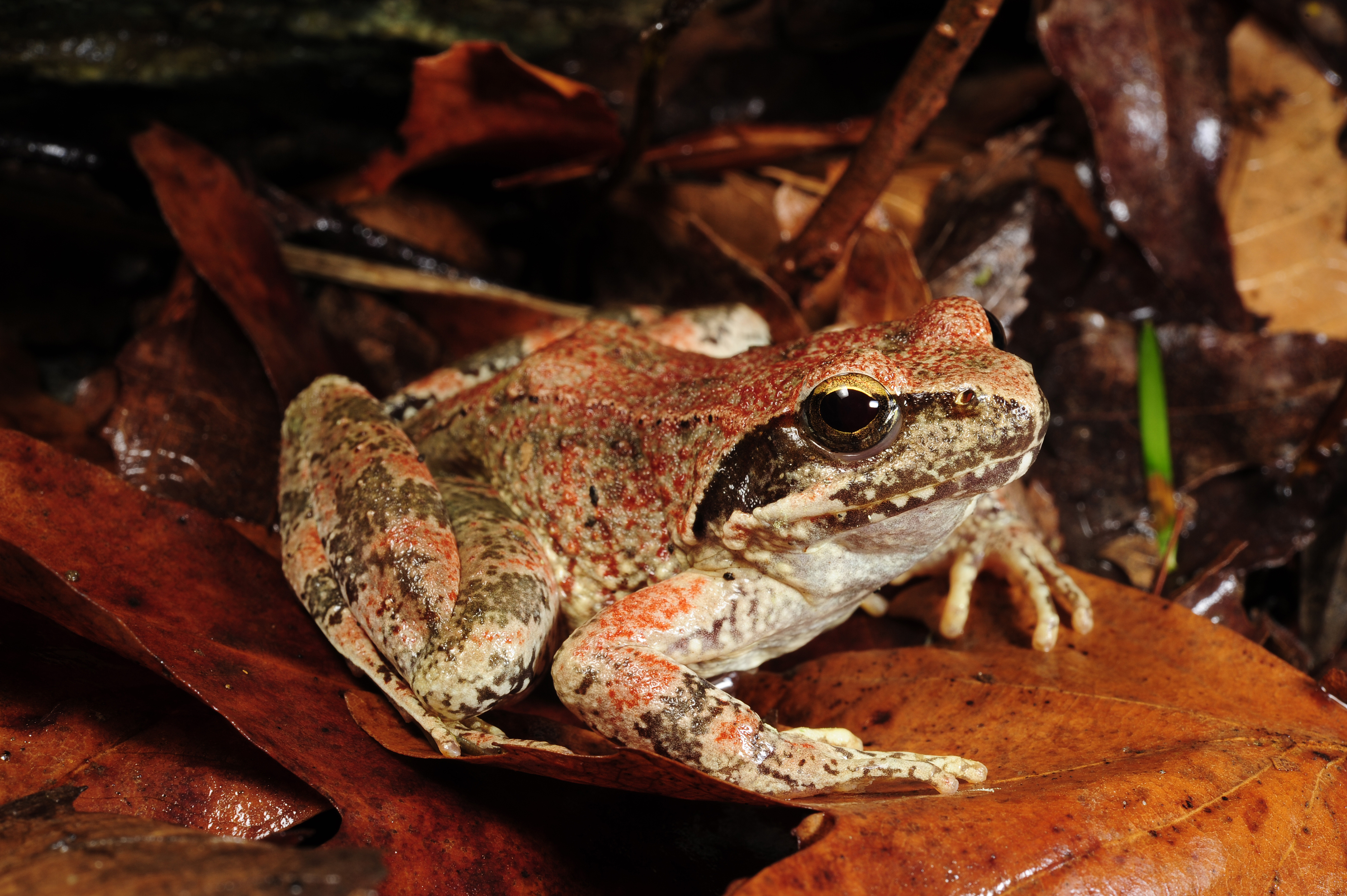

Conservation status
- Least Concern (IUCN 3.1)

Scientific classification
- Kingdom: Animalia
- Phylum: Chordata
- Class: Amphibia
- Order: Anura
- Family: Ranidae
- Genus: Rana
- Species: R. graeca

Binomial name
- Rana graeca Boulenger, 1891

= Greek stream frog =

Species of amphibian

The Greek stream frog, or simply Greek frog (Rana graeca), is a species of frog in the family Ranidae found in Albania, Bosnia and Herzegovina, Bulgaria, Greece, North Macedonia, Serbia, Montenegro and Turkey. Its natural habitats are temperate forests, temperate grassland, rivers, intermittent rivers, freshwater springs, and pastureland. It is not considered threatened by the IUCN.

== Reproduction ==
Reproductive periods occur only once a year, beginning shortly after hibernation in February and ending in April. The process involves a call from the male, which can come from either under or above the water surface, mainly during the night. Males will, however, call during the day depending on water temperature. Spots seen as safe and out of sight by the species, such as dark crevices in the bank under roots or stones, are its first choice for calling and mating sites.

The egg masses are then attached to the roof of a cavity. Each egg mass may contain anywhere from 200 to 2000 individual eggs, which range from 2 to 3.5 millimetres in diameter, surrounded by a protective gelatinous envelope of size between 4 and 7 millimetres. Observation has led to believe that males can guard the eggs for a certain amount of time.

The newly hatched larvae are about 9 millimetres in length, and grow up to 45 millimetres in anywhere from two to three months (water temperature may, however, cause development to slow down). After their third hibernation, the new Rana graeca reach sexual maturity.
