= Rana pliocenica =

Rana pliocenica Temporal range: Miocene

Scientific classification
- Kingdom: Animalia
- Phylum: Chordata
- Class: Amphibia
- Order: Anura
- Family: Ranidae
- Genus: Rana
- Species: †R. pliocenica

Binomial name
- †Rana pliocenica Zweifel, 1954

Extinct species of frog

Rana pliocenica is an extinct species of frog within the family Ranidae. The species was described by Richard G. Zweifel from the Miocene of the Pinole Tuff Formation in Contra Costa County, California, with the type locality being from UCMP 1037, Hipparion Point. The holotype specimen named UCMP 34564 is a partial skeleton.
