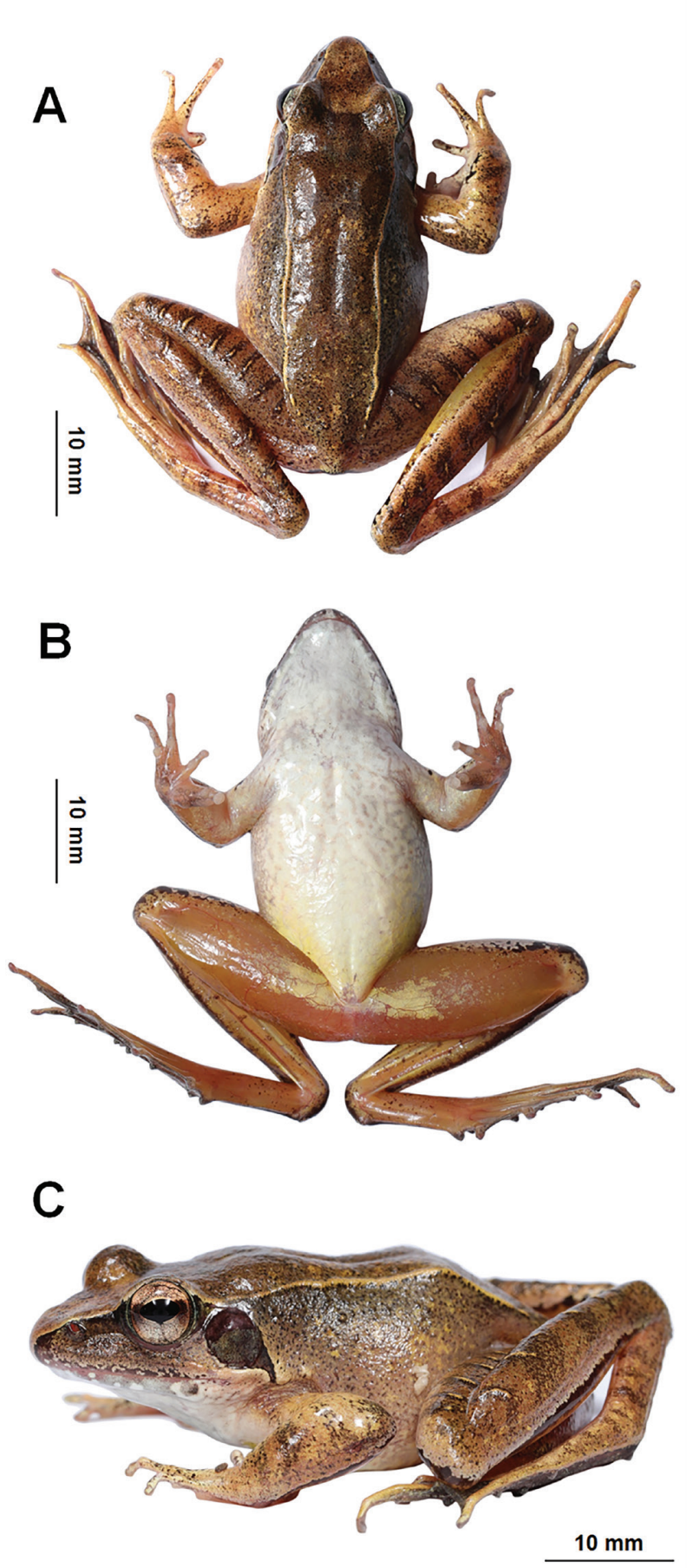
- Rana wuyiensis (various views)

Scientific classification
- Kingdom: Animalia
- Phylum: Chordata
- Class: Amphibia
- Order: Anura
- Family: Ranidae
- Genus: Rana
- Species: R. wuyiensis

Binomial name
- Rana wuyiensis Wu et al.,
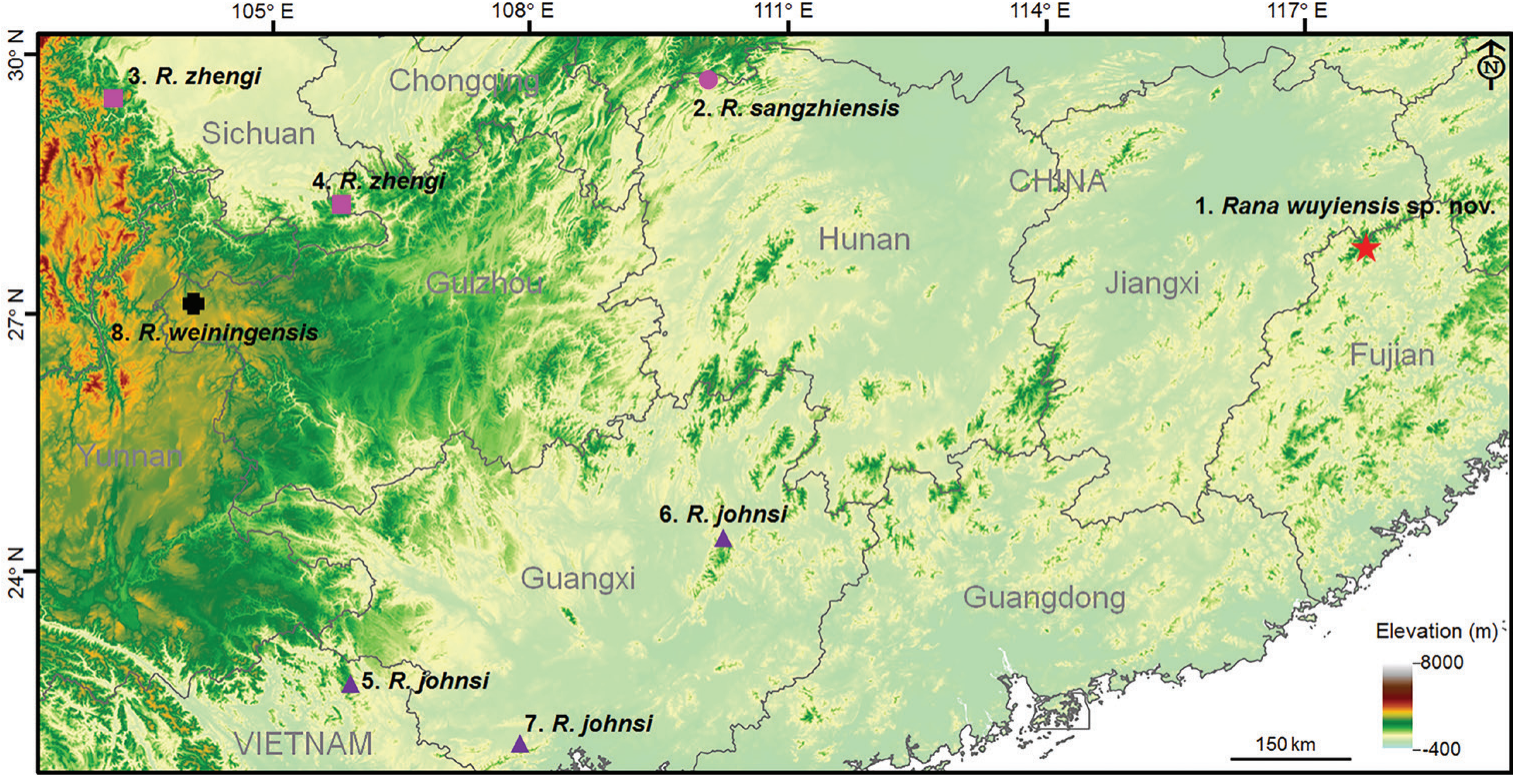
- Rana wuyiensis range shown by red star

= Rana wuyiensis =

Species of frog

Rana wuyiensis, the Wuyi brown frog, is a species of true frog that was discovered in the Wuyi Mountains, China.

== Etymology ==
The name Rana wuyiensis stems from where it was collected (its type locality), which was on the Wuyi Mountain in the Fujian Province, China. The suffix "-ensis" approximately means "originated in" which is the standard suffix when naming an organism after their place of origin.
