= Chaochiao frog =

Conservation status
- Least Concern (IUCN 3.1)

Scientific classification
- Kingdom: Animalia
- Phylum: Chordata
- Class: Amphibia
- Order: Anura
- Family: Ranidae
- Genus: Rana
- Species: R. chaochiaoensis

Binomial name
- Rana chaochiaoensis Liu, 1946

Species of amphibian

The Chaochiao frog (Rana chaochiaoensis) is a species of frog in the family Ranidae, found in China and possibly in Myanmar and Vietnam. Its natural habitats are temperate forests, subtropical or tropical moist montane forests, subtropical or tropical high-altitude shrubland, subtropical or tropical high-altitude grassland, rivers, swamps, freshwater lakes, freshwater marshes, intermittent freshwater marshes, ponds, irrigated land, and canals and ditches. It is not considered threatened by the IUCN.
