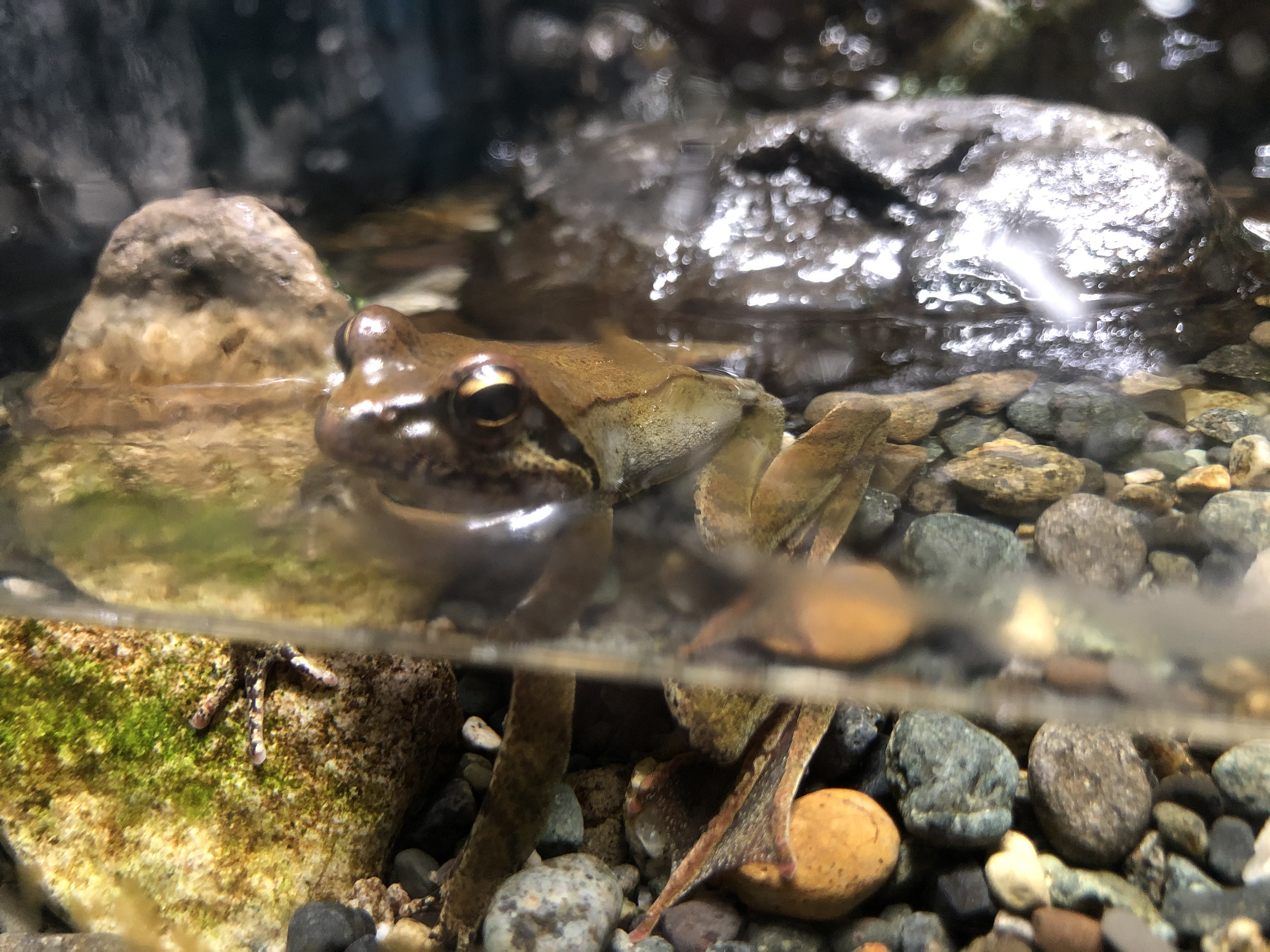
- Rana sakuraii Yamanashi aquarium

Conservation status
- Least Concern (IUCN 3.1)

Scientific classification
- Kingdom: Animalia
- Phylum: Chordata
- Class: Amphibia
- Order: Anura
- Family: Ranidae
- Genus: Rana
- Species: R. sakuraii

Binomial name
- Rana sakuraii T. Matsui & M. Matsui, 1990

= Stream brown frog =

Species of amphibian

The stream brown frog or Napparagawa frog (Rana sakuraii) is a species of frog in the family Ranidae. It is endemic to Japan.

Its natural habitats are temperate forests and rivers.
