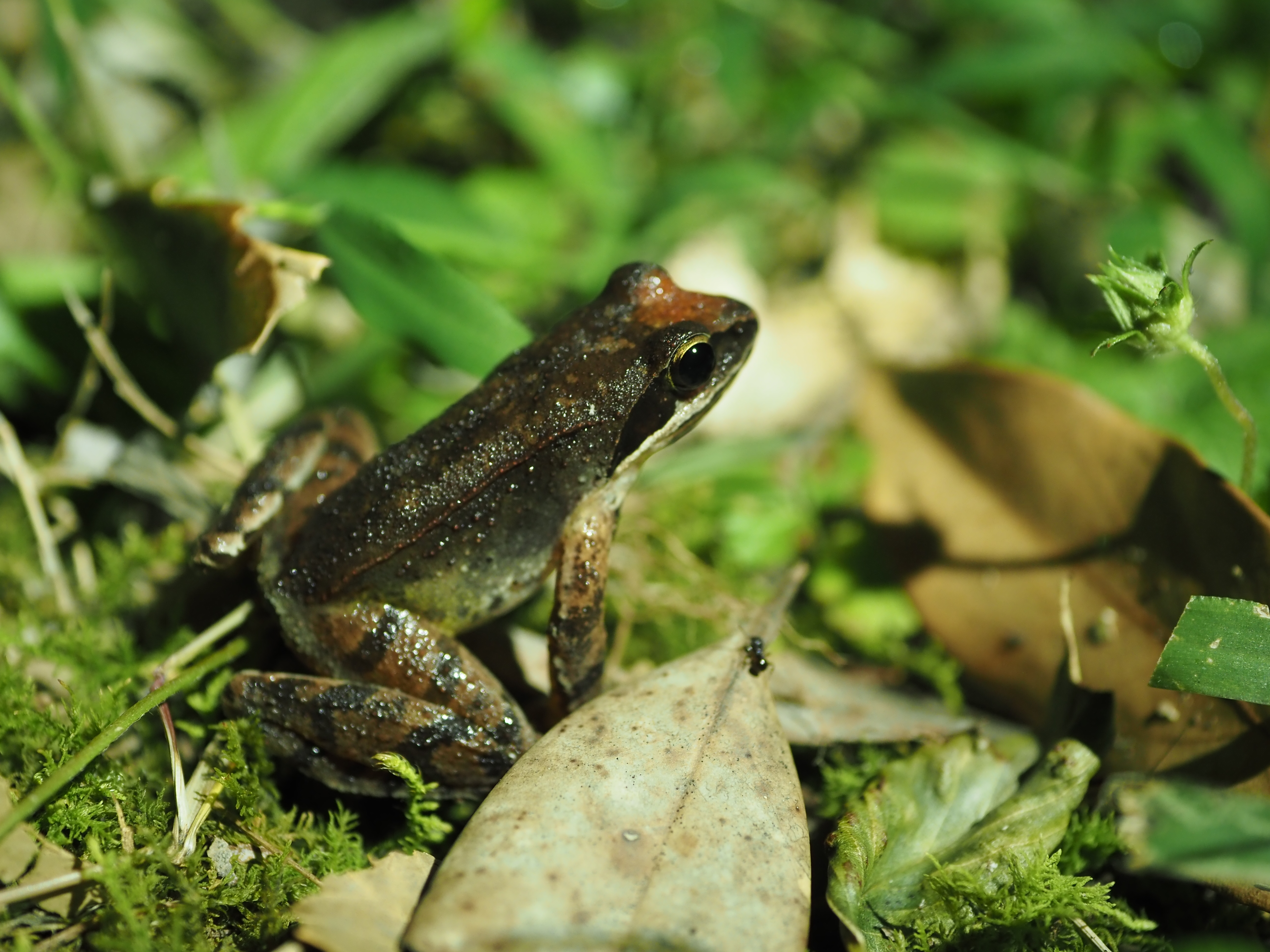

Conservation status
- Near Threatened (IUCN 3.1)

Scientific classification
- Kingdom: Animalia
- Phylum: Chordata
- Class: Amphibia
- Order: Anura
- Family: Ranidae
- Genus: Rana
- Species: R. tsushimensis

Binomial name
- Rana tsushimensis Stejneger, 1907

Synonyms
- Rana temporaria tsushimensis — Sato and Takashima, 1955; Rana (Rana) amurensis tsushimensis — Nakamura and Ueno, 1963

= Tsushima brown frog =

Species of amphibian

The Tsushima brown frog or Tsushima leopard frog (Rana tsushimensis) is a species of frog in the family Ranidae. It is endemic to the Tsushima Island, Japan.

This species is common and occurs in forests and streams from lowland to hilly areas. Breeding takes place in rice paddies, ditches, swamps, and other wetland habitats. It is not facing any known threats, although its small range is a vulnerability.
