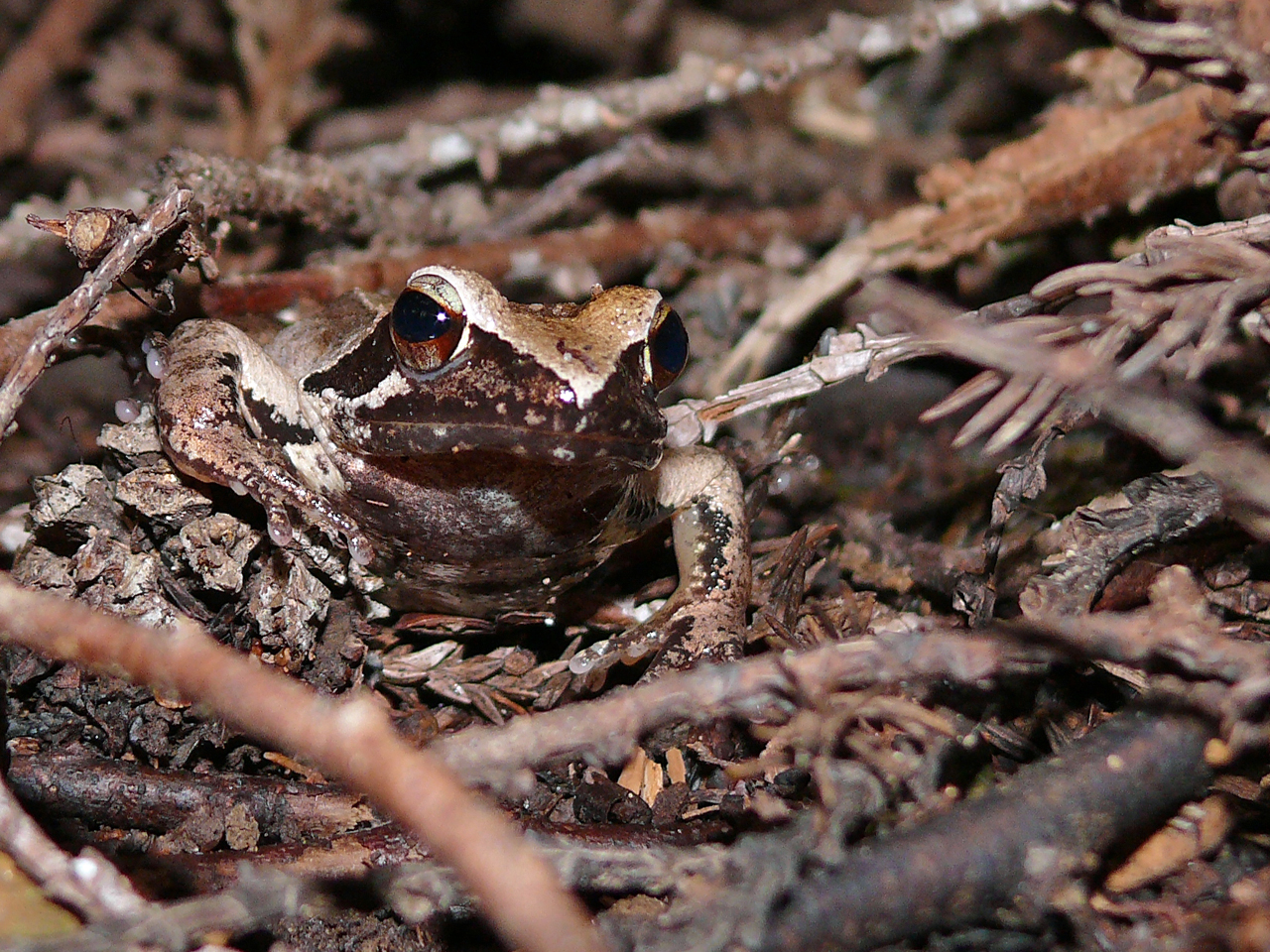

Conservation status
- Least Concern (IUCN 3.1)

Scientific classification
- Kingdom: Animalia
- Phylum: Chordata
- Class: Amphibia
- Order: Anura
- Family: Ranidae
- Genus: Rana
- Species: R. tagoi

Binomial name
- Rana tagoi Okada, 1928

= Tago's brown frog =

Species of amphibian

Tago's brown frog or the Tago frog (Rana tagoi) is a species of frog in the family Ranidae endemic to Japan. It is widely distributed within Japan and found on Honshu, Shikoku, and Kyushu, as well as on some outlying islands. There are two subspecies:

- Rana tagoi okiensis — Oki Islands
- Rana tagoi yakushimensis — Yakushima

These might qualify as species. It can also introgres with its sister species, Rana sakuraii.

== Habitat ==
These frogs are found in mountainous areas close to streams in the leaf-litter, or underneath stones in the streams. They lay their eggs in subterranean rivers, where the tadpoles grow into frogs. In late spring their croaks can be heard from above ground.
