= Weining frog =

Conservation status
- Least Concern (IUCN 3.1)

Scientific classification
- Kingdom: Animalia
- Phylum: Chordata
- Class: Amphibia
- Order: Anura
- Family: Ranidae
- Genus: Pseudorana; Fei, Ye, and Huang, 1990
- Species: P. weiningensis

Binomial name
- Pseudorana weiningensis (Liu, Hu & Yang, 1962)

Synonyms
- Rana weiningensis Liu, Hu & Yang, 1962

Species of amphibian

Pseudorana weiningensis is a species of true frog endemic to China. It is the only species in the genus Pseudorana. It is also known as the Weining frog or Weining groove-toed frog. Its natural habitats are temperate shrubland, temperate grassland, and rivers. It is threatened by habitat loss.
