= Xenbase =

Model organism database on Xenopus frogs

Content
- Description: Xenbase: The Xenopus Model Organism Knowledgebase.
- Data types captured: Phenotypes, Diseases, Literature, Nucleotide Sequence, RNA sequence, Protein sequence, Structure, Genomics, Morpholinos, Metabolic and Signaling Pathways, Human and other Vertebrate Genomes, Human Genes and Diseases, Microarray Data and other Gene Expression, Proteomics Resources, Other Molecular Biology, Organelle
- Organisms: Xenopus laevis and Xenopus tropicalis

Contact
- Research center: Cincinnati Children's Hospital, University of Calgary
- Laboratory: Zorn lab, Vize lab
- Primary citation: PMID 41182265
- Release date: 1999

Access
- Website: https://www.xenbase.org/
- Download URL: https://download.xenbase.org/xenbase/

Tools
- Standalone: BLAST, JBrowse, JBrowse2

Miscellaneous
- License: Public domain
- Data release frequency: Continuous
- Version: 8.x
- Curation policy: Professionally curated
- Bookmarkable entities: Yes

Xenbase is a Model Organism Database (MOD), providing informatics resources, as well as genomic and biological data on Xenopus frogs. Xenbase has been available since 1999, and covers both X. laevis and X. tropicalis Xenopus varieties. As of 2013 all of its services are running on virtual machines in a private cloud environment, making it one of the first MODs to do so. Other than hosting genomics data and tools, Xenbase supports the Xenopus research community though profiles for researchers and laboratories, and job and events postings.

== Xenbase's Software and Hardware Platform ==
Xenbase runs in a cloud environment. Its virtual machines are running in a VMware vSphere environment on two servers, with automatic load balancing and fault tolerance. Xenbase software uses Java, JSP, JavaScript, AJAX, XML, and CSS. It also uses Apache Tomcat and the Postgres database. The same hardware and software platforms support Echinobase.

== Supported Species ==
Xenbase offers two levels of support. Full support includes full genome integration in the database, including gene pages, BLAST, JBrowse, and genome downloads. Partial support provides BLAST, JBrowse, and download options, but no gene page integration.

Full support: Xenbase's primary mission is to provide comprehensive support for the following frogs

- Xenopus laevis (Africal clawed frog)
- Xenopus tropicalis (Western clawed frog)

Partial support:

- Rana catesbeiana (American bullfrog)
- Nanorana parkeri (High Himalaya frog)
- Ambystoma mexicanum (Axolotl)
- Hymenochirus boettgeri (Zaire or Congo dwarf clawed frog)

== Xenopus as a Model Organism ==
The Xenopus model organism is responsible for large amounts of new knowledge on embryonic development and cell biology. Xenopus has a number of unique experimental advantages as a vertebrate model. Paramount among these is the robustness of early embryos and their amenability to microinjection and microsurgery. This makes them a particularly attractive system for testing the ectopic activity of gene products and loss-of-function experiments using antagonizing reagents such as morpholinos, dominant-negatives and neomorphic proteins. Morpholinos are synthetic oligonucleotides that can be used to inhibit nuclear RNA splicing or mRNA translation and are the common gene inhibition reagent in Xenopus as neither siRNA or miRNA have yet been shown to reproducibly function in frog embryos. Xenopus embryos develop very quickly and form a full set of differentiated tissues within days of fertilization, allowing rapid analysis of the effects of manipulating embryonic gene expression. The large size of embryos and amenability to microinjection also makes them extremely well suited to microarray approaches. Furthermore, these same characteristics make Xenopus, one of the few vertebrate model organisms suited for chemical screens. Xenbase provides a large database of images illustrating the full genome, movies detailing embryogenesis, and multiple online tools useful for designing and conducting experiments using Xenopus.

== Xenopus as a Human Disease Model ==
Xenopus can be used to model human diseases caused by common genes. Xenbase supports this by mapping Disease Ontology and OMIM diseases to Xenopus genes and publications. Xenopus phenotype data, as well as links to comparable human and mouse phenotypes and diseases (via the Monarch Initiative) are also provided.

== Xenbase Contents and Tools ==
Xenbase provides many tools useful for both professional research as well as academic learning. Highlighted below are a few of the tools, along with a brief description. For full details on provided tools, users are referred to Xenbase's publications. A detailed introduction to using Xenabse comes in.

- Phenotype support, including Monarch Initiative (human and mouse) data links
- Diseases - Users can search for both Disease Ontology and OMIM diseases to find relevant Xenopus genes and publications
- NGS RNA-Seq and ChIP-Seq data integration and visualization from Gene Expression Omnibus (GEO).
- RNA-Seq viewers - Graphs of temporal expression profiles and spatial (anatomy) expression heatmaps for both laevis and tropicalis
- Gene Expression - Xenbase supports search and visualization of Gene Expression Omnibus (GEO) data sets, mapped to the latest Xenopus genomes.
- BLAST - Users can BLAST against Xenopus genomes, RNA, and protein sequences
- Genome browser - Xenbase uses both JBrowse and GBrowse
- Expression Search and Clone Search - Search by gene symbol, gene name, anatomy item, etc.
- Gene nomenclature guidelines - Xenbase is the official body responsible for Xenopus gene naming
- Literature search: Textpresso- Uses an algorithm to match your search to specific criteria or section of a paper. For example, you could identify papers describing HOX genes and limit your results to only papers which used morpholinos.
- Anatomy and Development: Images, fate maps, videos, etc.
- Community Link - People, jobs, labs which study Xenopus
- Protocol List- Identify clones, antibodies, procedures
- Stock Center- Supports the National Xenopus Resource, the European Xenopus Resource Centre, etc. to help researchers with obtaining frog stocks or advanced research training

== 2012 Nobel Prize in Xenopus Research ==
The Nobel Prize for Medicine or Physiology was awarded to John B. Gurdon and Shinya Yamanaka on October 8, 2012. for nuclear reprogramming in Xenopus.

Importance: Gurdon's experiments challenged the dogma of the time which suggested that the nucleus of a differentiated cell is committed to their fate (Example: a liver cell nucleus remains a liver cell nucleus and cannot return to an undifferentiated state).

Specifically, John Gurdon's experiments showed that a mature or differentiated cell nucleus can be returned to its immature undifferentiated form; this is the first instance of cloning of a vertebrate animal.

Experiment: Gurdon used a technique known as nuclear transfer to replace the killed-off nucleus of a frog (Xenopus) egg with a nucleus from a mature cell (intestinal epithelial). The tadpoles resulting from these eggs did not survive long (past the gastrulation stage), however, further transformation of the nuclei from these Xenopus eggs to a second set of Xenopus eggs resulted in fully developed tadpoles. This process (transfer of nuclei from cloned cells) is referred to as serial transplantation.

== Xenopus Research Utilizing Xenbase Tools ==
To provide examples of how Xenbase could be used to facilitate academic research, two research articles are briefly described below.

- Genetic Screens for Mutations Affecting Development of X. tropicalis.

This paper uses Xenbase resources to create and characterize mutations in Xenopus tropicalis. Goda et al., performed a large scale forward genetics screen on X. tropicalis embryos to identify novel mutations (2006). Defects were noted and put into 10 different categories as follows: eye, ear, neural crest/pigment, dwarf, axial, gut, cardiovascular, head, cardiovascular plus motility, and circulation. Further studies were performed on the whitehart mutant "wha" which does not have normal circulating blood. The Xenopus Molecular Marker Resource page was used to design a microarray experiment which compared wild type (normal circulation) and "wha" mutant X. tropicalis. Analysis of microarray data revealed that 216 genes had significant changes in expression, with genes involved in hemoglobin and heme biosynthesis being the most affected, consistent with the observation that "wha" may have a role in hematopoiesis.

- High efficiency TALENs enable F0 functional analysis by targeted gene disruption in Xenopus laevis embryos.

The 2013 paper by Suzuki et al. describes the use of a relatively new gene knockdown technique in X. laevis. Traditionally, antisense morpholino oligonucleotides have been the method of choice to study the effects of transient gene knockdown in Xenopus.

In comparison to morpholinos which disrupt gene expression by inhibiting translational machinery TALENs disrupt gene expression by binding to DNA and introducing double stranded breaks. Xenbase was utilized to obtain publicly available sequences for tyrosinase (tyr) and Pax6, needed for TALEN design. Knockdown of both Pax6 and tyr was highly efficient using TALENs, suggesting that gene disruption using TALENs may be an alternative or better method to use in comparison to antisense morpholino's.

== See also ==
- Echinobase
- FlyBase
- WormBase
- Mouse Genome Informatics
- ZFIN
- DictyBase
