= C3orf38 =

Uncharacterized gene

Identifiers
- Aliases: C3orf38, chromosome 3 open reading frame 38
- External IDs: MGI: 1914859; HomoloGene: 27867; GeneCards: C3orf38; OMA:C3orf38 - orthologs

Gene location (Human)
Chr.	Chromosome 3 (human)
Band	3p11.1	Start	88,149,959 bp
Band	3p11.1	End	88,168,729 bp

Gene location (Mouse)
Chr.	Chromosome 16 (mouse)
Band	16|16 C1.3	Start	64,572,114 bp
Band	16|16 C1.3	End	64,591,524 bp
RNA expression pattern
Bgee	Human / Mouse (ortholog); Top expressed in: secondary oocyte; sperm; monocyte; gonad; Achilles tendon; bone marrow; left testis; right testis; ganglionic eminence; bone marrow cell / Top expressed in: seminiferous tubule; spermatid; spermatocyte; triceps brachii muscle; temporal muscle; intercostal muscle; sternocleidomastoid muscle; digastric muscle; medial head of gastrocnemius muscle; atrioventricular valve; More reference expression data
BioGPS	n/a
Gene ontology
Molecular function	molecular function
Cellular component	nucleus
Biological process	apoptotic process; positive regulation of apoptotic process
Sources:Amigo / QuickGO
Orthologs
Species	Human	Mouse
Entrez	285237	67609
Ensembl	ENSG00000179021	ENSMUSG00000059920
UniProt	Q5JPI3	Q3TTL0
RefSeq (mRNA)	NM_173824	NM_026273
RefSeq (protein)	NP_776185	NP_080549
Location (UCSC)	Chr 3: 88.15 – 88.17 Mb	Chr 16: 64.57 – 64.59 Mb
PubMed search
- Wikidata
View/Edit Human	View/Edit Mouse

Chromosome 3 open reading frame 38 (C3orf38) is a protein which in humans is encoded by the C3orf38 gene.

== Gene ==
Figure depicting human chromosome 3 and the 3p11.1 location at which the C3orf38 gene is found. Image derived from GeneCards.

The C3orf38 gene is located on chromosome 3 (3p11.1) on the forward strand. It spans 18,771 bases from chr3:88,149,959-88,168,729. It contains 3 exons. Common aliases for this gene are MGC26717, LOC285237, and FLJ54270. Some of the genes neighboring C3orf38 include ZNF654, CGGBP1, and LOC105377202.

== Transcripts ==
C3orf38 Transcripts
Protein Name	Gene ID	Transcript Accession	Length (nt)	Length (aa)
uncharacterized protein C3orf38	285237	NM_173824.4	2414	329
uncharacterized protein C3orf38 isoform X1	285237	XM_005264745.5	2356	328

== Protein ==
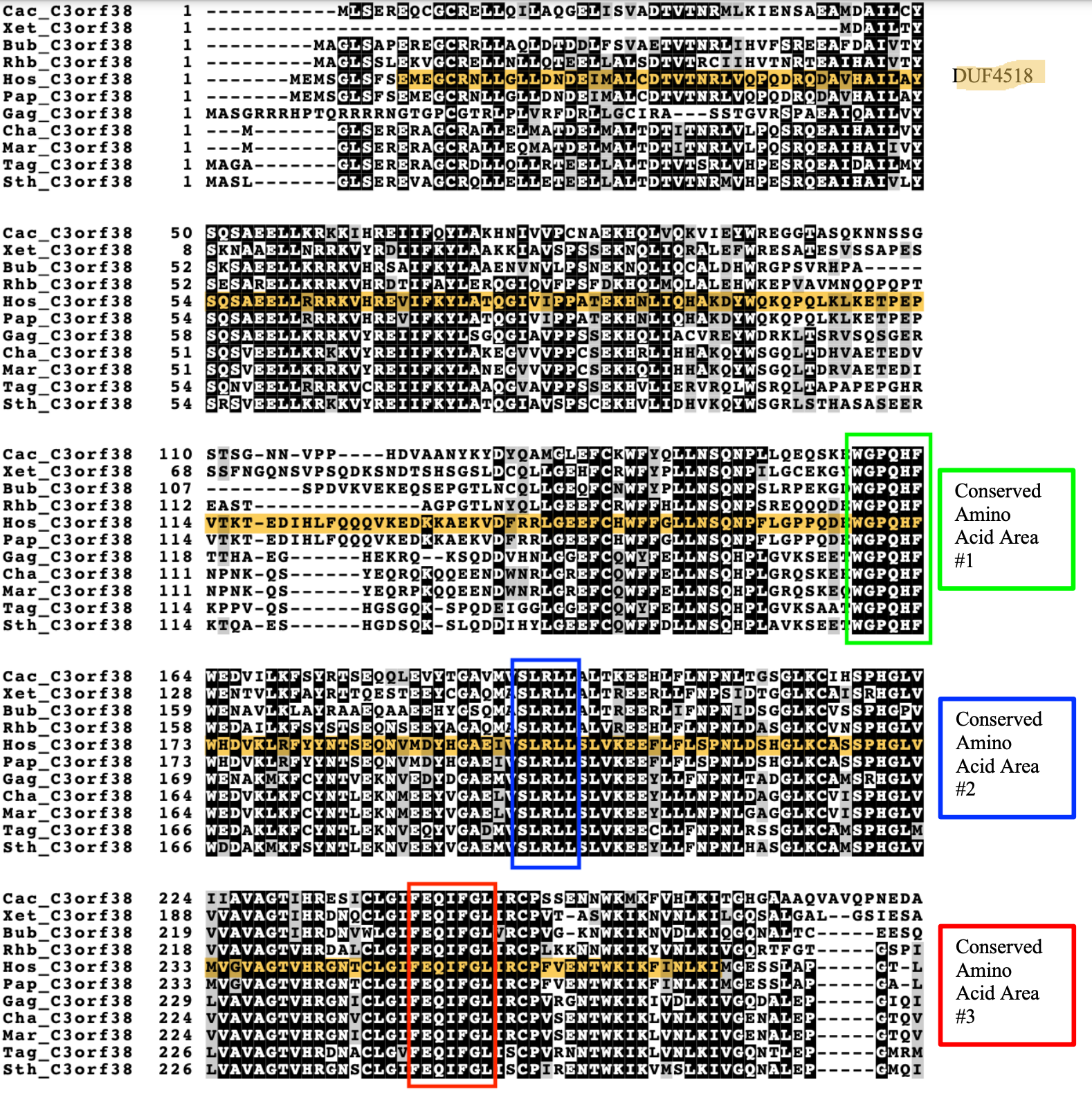
Multiple sequence alignment of C3orf38 protein in humans and various orthologs showing DUF conservation. MSA created using BoxShade tools.

The C3orf38 protein is 329 amino acids in length. A large domain of unknown function, DUF4518, encompasses majority of the C3orf38 protein. This domain is a part of the protein family pfam15008, which is thought to be involved in apoptosis regulation. This pfam15008 is the only member of the cl20886 superfamily. While the C3orf38 protein does not have any abnormal amino acid abundance as a whole, the DUF4518 has a high abundance of histidines and a low abundance of serines, according to compositional analysis. The predicted molecular weight of the entire C3orf38 protein is 37.0 kD and the isoelectric point is 6.01. The DUF4518 contained inside the C3orf38 protein has a predicted molecular weight of 31 kD and an isoelectric point of 6.49.

== Regulation ==
=== Gene Level Regulation ===
There have been a number of potential promoters identified for the C3orf38 gene, which are described in the table below.

Potential Promoters for the C3orf38 Gene
Promoter	Start	End	Length (bp)	Transcripts
GXP_203118	88148634	88150046	1413	GXT_23216585, GXT_22791246, GXT_2803824, GXT_26239186
GXP_9795962	88148768	88149807	1040	no transcript assigned; promoter based on comparative genomics
GXP_9795963	88148794	88150027	1234	no transcript assigned; promoter based on comparative genomics
GXP_3194836	88149604	88150643	1040	GXT_24485561

The C3orf38 gene exhibits ubiquitous expression in human tissues.

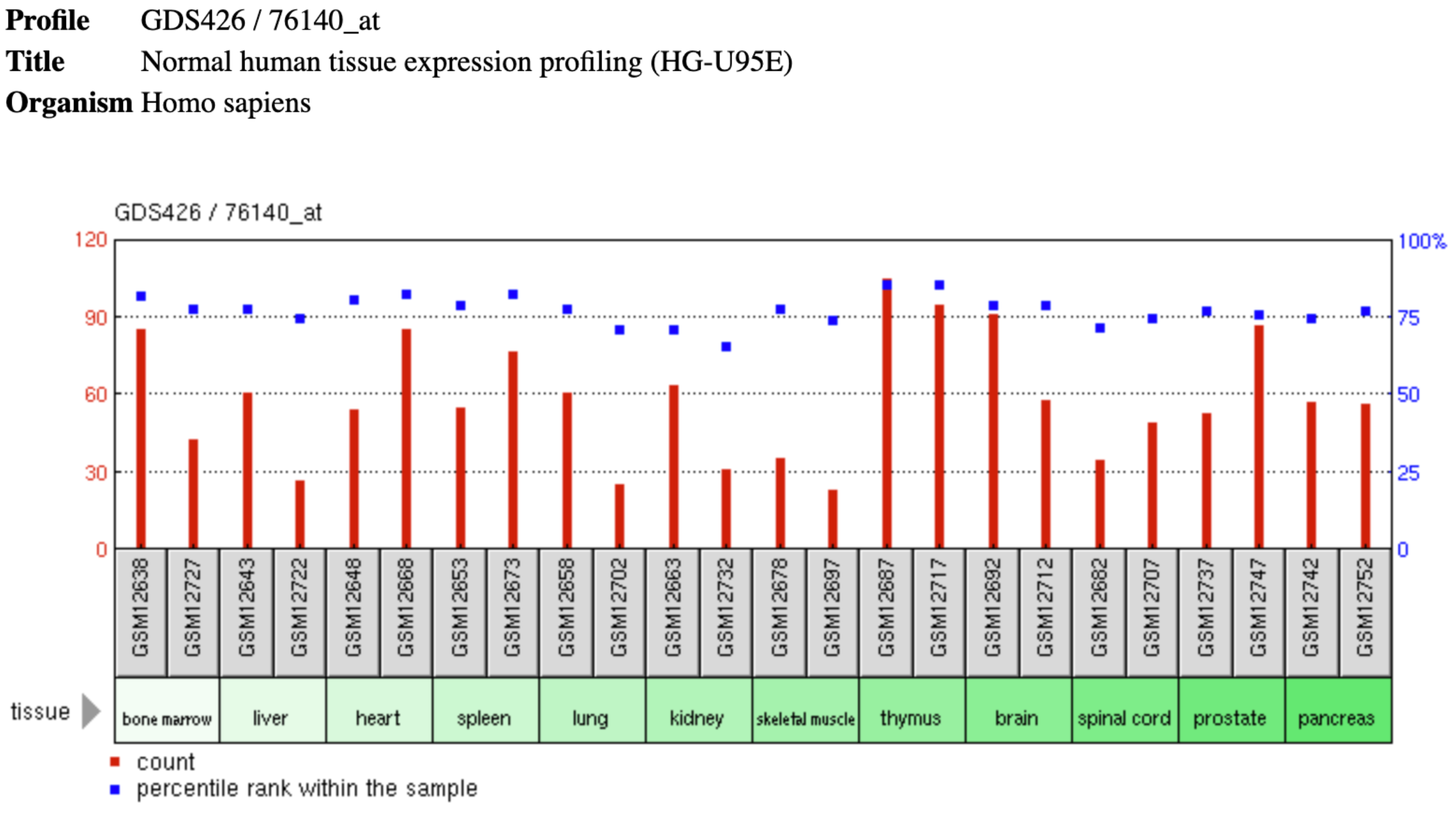
Normal human tissue expression profiling (HG-U95E) for the C3orf38 gene. Data pictured is captured from the NCBI GEO database.

=== Protein Level Regulation ===
The C3orf38 protein is expected to be found with the highest confidence in the cytoplasm. This finding is supported by examination of an array of C3orf38 orthologs.

There are several well conserved post translation modification sites found amongst the human C3orf38 protein and its orthologs, which are depicted in the table below. Majority of these PTMs are PKC phosphorylation sites. Additionally, two confirmed active sites are located in the C3orf38 protein. The first is an aldehyde dehydrogenases glutamic acid active site located from amino acids 1-8. The second site is a eukaryotic thiol (cysteine) proteases histidine active site located from amino acids 227-237.

Predicted cellular localization of C3orf38 in humans and several orthologs. Localization predictions gathered from PSORT II Prediction tool.

Conserved Post Translational Modification Sites
PTM	Protein Location (aa)
Myristyl site	235-240
PKC phosphorylation site	34-36
PKC phosphorylation site	86-88
PKC phosphorylation site	199-201
PKC phosphorylation site	265-267

== Homology/evolution ==
Orthologs for the C3orf38 protein can be found in mammals, reptiles, birds, amphibians, fish, and invertebrates using BLAST searches. A selection of these orthologs can be found in the ortholog table below. There are no paralogs. Additionally, by comparing sequences of C3orf38 protein with cytochrome C and fibrinogen alpha proteins, a moderate rate of evolution was determined for the C3orf38 protein.

C3orf38 Ortholog Table
	Genus, species	Common name	Taxonomic group	Divergence Date (MYA)	Accession number	Sequence length (aa)	Sequence identity (%)	Sequence similarity (%)
Mammals	Homo sapiens	Human	Primates	0	NP_776185.2	329	100	100
Mammals	Pan paniscus	Bonobo	Primates	6.7	XP_003831564.1	329	99.4	99.7
Mammals	Puma concolor	Puma	Carnivora	96	XP_025769652.1	348	79.8	86.6
Reptiles	Mauremys reevesii	Reeve's Turtle	Testudines	312	XP_039379932.1	315	55.7	70.5
Reptiles	Chelonoidis abingdonii	Abingdon Island Giant Tortoise	Testudines	312	XP_032650981.1	304	55.4	69.9
Birds	Strigops habroptila	Kākāpō	Psittaciformes	312	XP_030327387.1	309	52.1	66.3
Birds	Taeniopygia guttata	Zebra Finch	Passeriformes	312	XP_002190058.5	306	51	63.9
Birds	Gallus gallus	Chicken	Galliformes	312	XP_004938363.2	312	44.2	59.9
Amphibians	Rhinatrema bivittatum	Two-Lined Caecilian	Gymnophiona	351.8	XP_029434832.1	289	49.7	64.5
Amphibians	Bufo bufo	Common Toad	Anura	351.8	XP_040279187.1	289	43.9	62.1
Amphibians	Xenopus tropicalis	Tropical Clawed Frog	Anura	351.8	XP_017946806.1	261	38.6	54.8
Fish	Chelmon rostratus	Copperband Butterflyfish	Perciformes	435	XP_041807133.1	302	42.7	58.2
Fish	Coregonus clupeaformis	Lake Whitefish	Salmoniformes	435	XP_041700482.1	308	42.4	60.6
Fish	Carcharodon carcharias	Great White Shark	Lamniformes	473	XP_041066710.1	308	45	59.8
Fish	Amblyraja radiata	Thorny Skate	Rajiformes	473	XP_032888490.1	382	32.5	46.5
Invertebrates	Lytechinus variegatus	Sea Urchin	Temnopleuroida	684	XP_041465399.1	312	36.4	48.3
Invertebrates	Patiria miniata	Bat Star	Valvatida	684	XP_038067113.1	294	34.1	46.2
Invertebrates	Cryptotermes secundus	Termite	Blattodea	797	XP_023724689.1	296	30.1	48
Invertebrates	Crassostrea virginica	Eastern Oyster	Ostreidae	797	XP_022335568.1	340	29.6	46.5
Invertebrates	Diabrotica virgifera	Western Corn Rootworm	Coleoptera	797	XP_028133096.1	284	26.9	43.6
Invertebrates	Acropora millepora	Branching Stony Coral	Scleractinia	824	XP_029194133.1	288	32.6	50.9

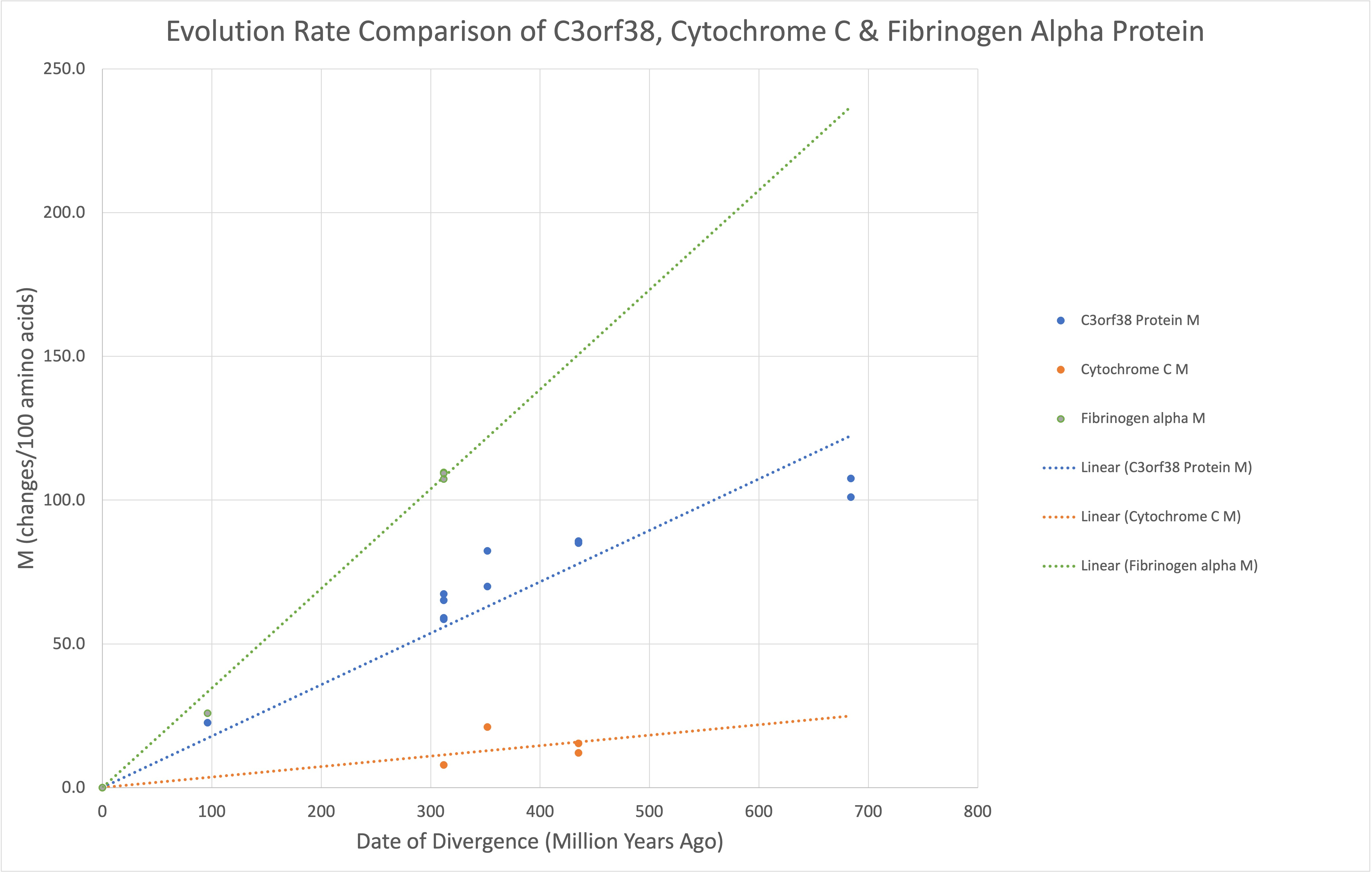
Figure showing an evolution rate graph comparing the C3orf38, cytochrome C, and fibrinogen alpha proteins. Noting the cytochrome C to be a relatively slow-evolving protein and the fibrinogen alpha to be a relatively fast-evolving protein, it is clear that C3orf38 protein evolves at a comparatively moderate rate.

== Function ==
Although investigation into the function of the C3orf38 gene is ongoing, a couple studies have granted valuable insights into its role. One study has identified C3orf38 as a candidate proapoptotic gene. Another study identified C3orf38 as a top candidate tumor suppressor gene (TSG).

== Interacting proteins ==
Of the various proteins C3orf38 protein interacts with, two are particularly interesting seeing as C3orf38 is a candidate proapoptotic and tumor suppressor gene. First, BAG family molecular chaperone regulator 4 (BAG4) is an anti-apoptotic protein that is known to interact with a number of apoptosis and growth-related proteins. Second, DnaJ Heat Shock Protein Family Member B4 (DNAJB4) is a member of the heat shock protein-40 family (Hsp40), a molecular chaperone, and a tumor suppressor (specifically for colorectal carcinoma).
