= Dysmorphic feature =

Abnormal difference in body structure

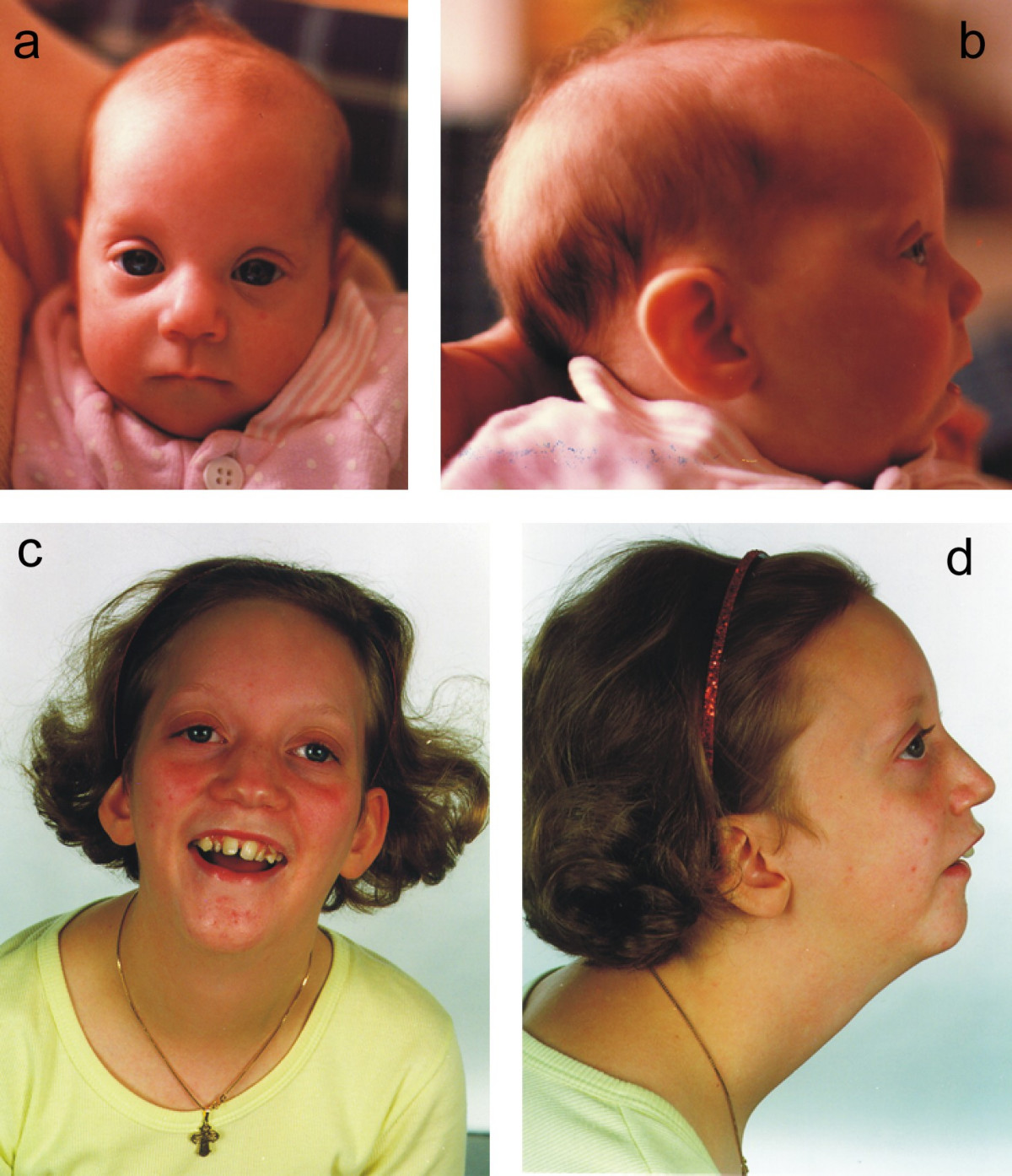
Multiple dysmorphic features in a patient with Pitt–Rogers–Danks syndrome: microcephalia, micrognathia and protrusion of the eyeballs

A dysmorphic feature is an abnormal difference in body structure. It can be an isolated finding in an otherwise normal individual, or it can be related to a congenital disorder, genetic syndrome or birth defect. Dysmorphology is the study of dysmorphic features, their origins and proper nomenclature. One of the key challenges in identifying and describing dysmorphic features is the use and understanding of specific terms between different individuals. Clinical geneticists and pediatricians are usually those most closely involved with the identification and description of dysmorphic features, as most are apparent during childhood.

Dysmorphic features can vary from isolated, mild anomalies such as clinodactyly or synophrys to severe congenital anomalies, such as heart defects and holoprosencephaly. In some cases, dysmorphic features are part of a larger clinical picture, sometimes known as a sequence, syndrome or association. Recognizing the patterns of dysmorphic features is an important part of a geneticist's diagnostic process, as many genetic disease present with a common collection of features. There are several commercially available databases that allow clinicians to input their observed features in a patient to generate a differential diagnosis. These databases are not infallible, as they require on the clinician to provide their own experience, particularly when the observed clinical features are general. A male child with short stature and hypertelorism could have several different disorders, as these findings are not highly specific. However a finding such as 2,3-toe syndactyly raises the index of suspicion for Smith–Lemli–Opitz syndrome.

Most open source projects that perform phenotype-driven disease or gene prioritization work with the terminology of the Human Phenotype Ontology. This controlled vocabulary can be used to describe the clinical features of a patient and is suitable for machine learning approaches. Publicly accessible databases that labs use to deposit their diagnostic findings, such as ClinVar, can be used to build knowledge graphs to explore the clinical feature space.

Dysmorphic features are invariably present from birth, although some are not immediately apparent upon visual inspection. They can be divided into groups based on their origin, including malformations (abnormal development), disruptions (damage to previously normal tissue), deformations (damage caused by an outside physical force) and dysplasias (abnormal growth or organization within a tissue).

== Dysmorphology ==
Dysmorphology is the discipline of using dysmorphic features in the diagnostic workup and delineation of syndromic disorders. In the recent years advances in computer vision have also resulted in several deep learning approaches that assist geneticists in the study of the facial gestalt. Training and test data for clinicians and computer scientists in order to compare the performance of new AIs can be obtained from GestaltMatcher.
