= Echinobase =

Echinoderm genomic database

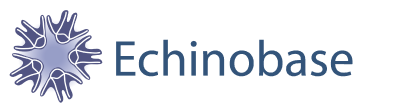

Content
- Description: Echinobase: The Echinoderm Knowledgebase.
- Data types captured: Literature, Nucleotide Sequence, RNA sequence, Protein sequence, Structure, Genomics, Morpholinos, Metabolic and Signaling Pathways, Human and other Vertebrate Genomes, Human Genes and Diseases, Microarray Data and other Gene Expression, Proteomics Resources, Other Molecular Biology, Organelle
- Organisms: echinoderms

Contact
- Research center: Carnegie Mellon University, University of Florida, University of Calgary
- Laboratory: Ettensohn lab, Hinman lab, Vize lab
- Primary citation: PMID 38262680
- Release date: 2009

Access
- Website: https://www.echinobase.org/
- Download URL: https://download.echinobase.org/echinobase/

Tools
- Standalone: BLAST, JBrowse

Miscellaneous
- License: Public domain
- Data release frequency: Continuous
- Version: 8.x
- Curation policy: Professionally curated
- Bookmarkable entities: Yes

Echinobase is a model organism database (MOD). It supports the international research community by providing a centralized, integrated web-based resource to access the diverse and rich functional genomics data of echinoderm evolution, development and gene regulatory networks.

Genomic research data and tools are available for searching, browsing and bioinformatic analysis of genomes, genes, and transcripts.

Echinobase provides a critical data sharing infrastructure for other NIH-funded projects and enhances the availability and visibility of echinoderm data to the broader biomedical research community.

== Supported species ==
Echinobase offers two levels of integration for supported echinoderm species. Full support includes full genome integration in the database, including gene pages, as well as availability of the genomes to BLAST, browsing via JBrowse, and genome download. Partial support provides BLAST, JBrowse, and download options, but no gene page integration.

Current level one supported species (at various stages of integration) are:

- Strongylocentrotus purpuratus (Purple sea urchin)
- Patiria miniata (Bat star)
- Lytechinus pictus (Painted urchin)
- Lytechinus variegatus (Green variegated sea urchin)
- Acanthaster planci (Crown-of-thorns starfish)

Current level two supported species (at various stages of integration) are:

- Anneissia japonica (Feather star, a crinoid)
- Asterias rubens (Sugar star)
- Amphiura filiformis (Brittle star)
- Ptychodera flava (Yellow acorn worm)

== Software, hardware and platform ==
Echinobase runs in a cloud environment. Its virtual machines are running in a VMware vSphere environment on two servers, with automatic load balancing and fault tolerance. Its software uses Java, JSP, JavaScript, AJAX, XML, and CSS. It also uses Apache Tomcat and the Postgres database. Echinobase is developed in tandem with Xenbase.

== Functional genomics ==
Echinobase is a resource for genomics research that is organized by gene models and represented using gene pages. Each gene page has a tremendous amount of gene-specific information.

Genomics – Search and BLAST tools are available directly or through the gene pages that display gene model HGNC-compliant names, orthology, GO terms and link to BLAST, the JBrowse genome browser, and a gene expression plotting tool.

Tabs beyond the summary provide gene-specific literature, transcripts, expression data, protein sequences and interactants.

Genomic research tools are implemented to assist browsing, search and analysis and visualization of genomic sequence assemblies, annotations and features. Additionally, gene expression data collection, search and visualization is provided.

- Gene search – Search genes by name, symbol or synonym directly from the landing page
- Gene nomenclature guidelines – Echinobase is the official body responsible for echinoderm gene naming
- Genome browser with tracks for RNA-seq and ATAC-seq data – Echinobase uses JBrowse
- BLAST – Users can BLAST against supported genomes, RNA, and protein sequences
- RNA-seq data visualization – Plots of temporal expression profiles and spatial (anatomy) expression heatmaps for S. purpuratus
- Diseases – Users can search for both Disease Ontology and OMIM diseases to find relevant genes and publications

The Echinoderm Anatomical Ontology (ECAO) uses standardized terms to refer to anatomical cell types and structures and relates these to developmental stages. Numerous echinoderm species are included in the ontology so that some terms are present in all echinoderms while others are species specific. The ECAO contains thousands of anatomical terms for cell types, structures and tissues and anatomical systems such as the nervous system or skeletal system. Relationships between entities are defined using "develops_from" or "develops_into" and "is_a" or "part_of".

- Echinoderm Anatomical Ontology – Standardized anatomy terms are used to describe developmental stages

== Literature, resources and community ==
Literature on Echinobase is collected by automatically searching published papers using echinoderm query terms and retrieved articles are then manually curated.

- Literature Search – Users can search for papers based on title, author, journal, etc.

The data download site makes GFF genome files available and Gene Page Reports provide files for bioinformatic analyses.

- EchinoWiki -The Echinobase Resources serve to support the community by collecting data, protocols, reagents and other resources that are then shared using the EchinoWiki.
- Reagents – Echinobase has reagent search tools for antibodies (Ab), morpholinos (MO), and guide RNAs (gRNA) used in published studies.

In order to support the Community and to enable interdisciplinary and collaborative studies, research, descriptions and contact information of community members, labs and organizations are available and searchable. New Job Openings are also posted on Echinobase.

- Community Link – People, jobs, labs which study echinoderms

== Other model organism databases (MODs) ==
- Xenbase
- Flybase
- Wormbase
- Mouse Genome Informatics
- ZFIN
- DictyBase
