= GestaltMatcher =

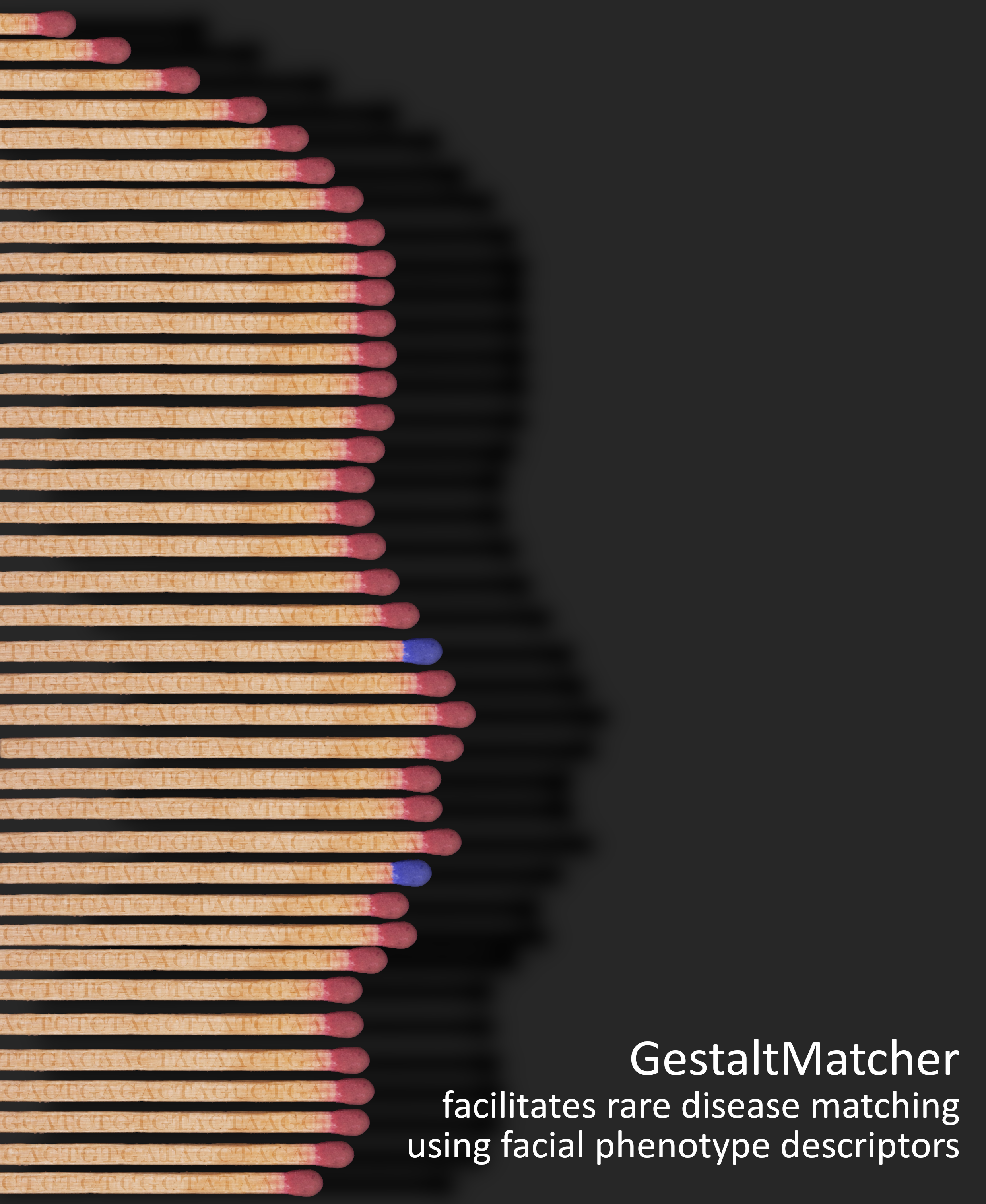
GestaltMatcher is a blend word of Gestalt and Match with a camel case M. Gestalt is a professional term in dysmorphology for a recognizable pattern and match is a person resembling another person in some respect. Since match is also a polyseme for a slender piece of wood with a flammable tip, this was used for the illustration of algorithm GestaltMatcher. The two matches with blue tips indicate the individuals affected by a shared rare disorder that need to be found. The AI can support with that task by computing the similarity between portraits.

GestaltMatcher is a continuously updated collection of medical images of individuals with rare diseases and open-source AIs for the interpretation of such data. As of March 2023, GestaltMatcher DataBase (GMDB) contained approximately 10,000 case reports with a molecular diagnosis and clinical features annotated with HPO terminology. Medical images include, for example, facial photographs of patients with genetic syndromes manifesting with facial dysmorphic features, as well as radiographs from those with skeletal dysplasias.

GestaltMatcher allows users to find and publish case reports, including medical images, if that option is chosen in the dynamic consent module. By that means, GMDB complements medRxiv and can also be used as a repository for re-identifiable images in preprints.

In a prospective three year multi center study, GestaltMatcher showed clinical utility as an artificial expert opinion in a multidisciplinary team.

== History ==
The GestaltMatcher project started in April 2021 during the revision of the manuscript from Hsieh, et al. with funding from University of Bonn and the German Research Foundation (DFG). The reviewers and editors of Nature Genetics asked for FAIR data in order to reproduce the algorithmic results described in that work. Since then, the database (GMDB) has grown by contributions from its community. Since January 2022, GMDB can be used as repository for medical imaging data for preprints submitted to medRxiv. In February 2023, at the 14th ICHG meeting in Cape Town, Prof. Shahida Moosa (Stellenbosch University) reported the 10,000 case, which is a patient from South Africa with Mabry syndrome. Prof. Peter Krawitz also announced at the conference that AGD e.V., a German non-profit organization, will oversee the GMDB from this point forward. In January 2024 the GestaltMatcher project received a donation from the Eva Luise und Horst Köhler Stiftung, which is a charity of the former German president Horst Köhler and his wife, Eva Köhler, to improve the medica care for people with rare diseases.
