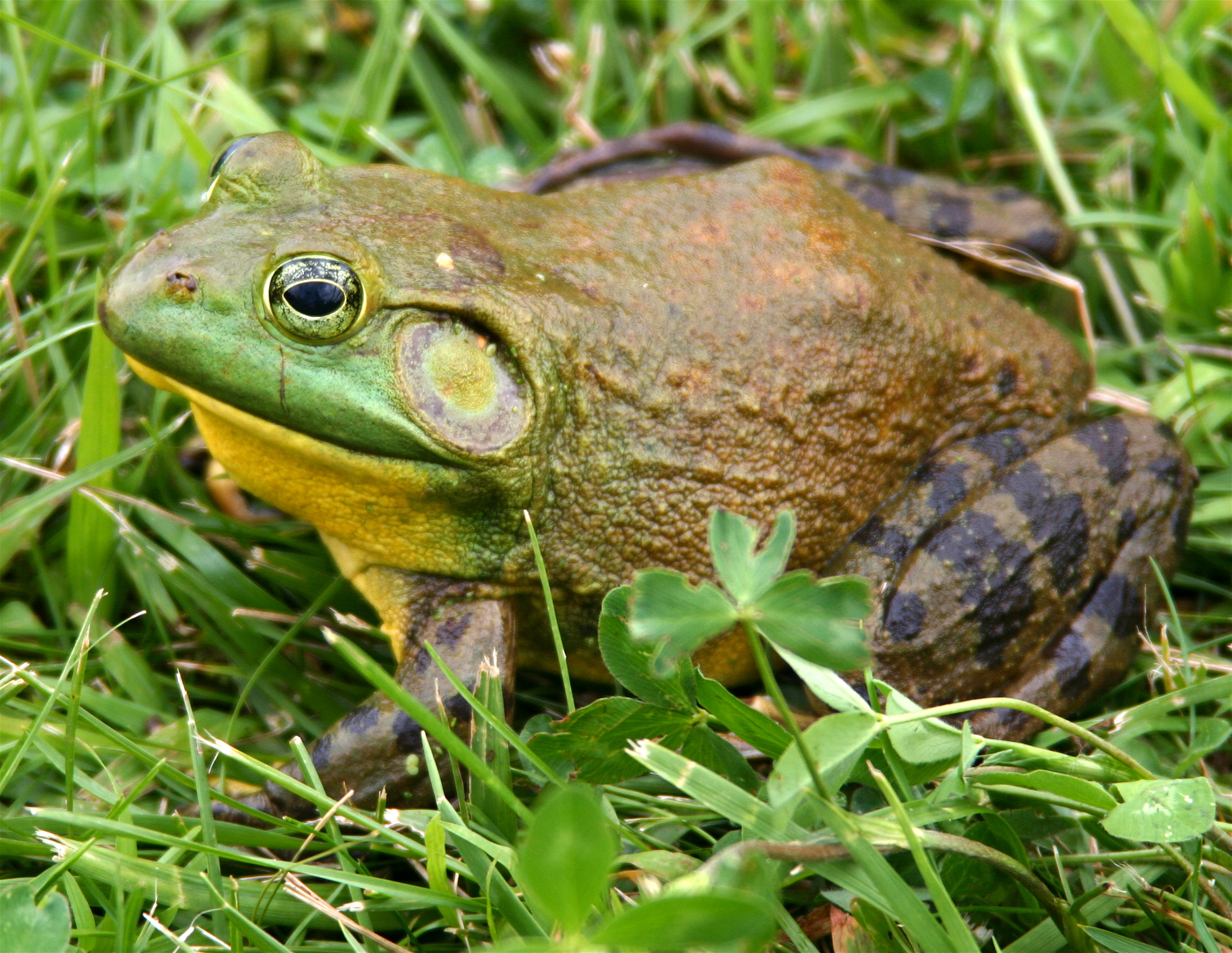
- Adult male

Conservation status
- Least Concern (IUCN 3.1)

- Secure (NatureServe)

Scientific classification
- Kingdom: Animalia
- Phylum: Chordata
- Class: Amphibia
- Order: Anura
- Family: Ranidae
- Genus: Lithobates
- Species: L. catesbeianus

Binomial name
- Lithobates catesbeianus (Shaw, 1802)
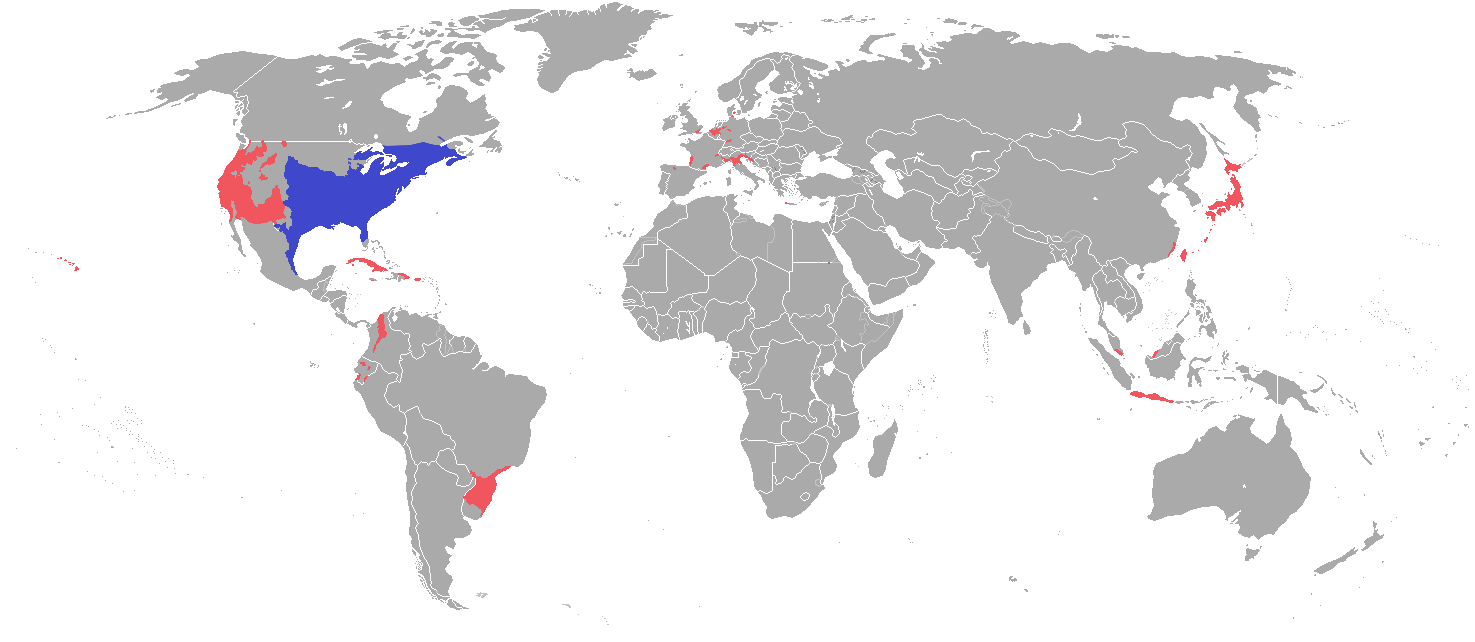
- Natural range – blue; Introduced range – red

Synonyms
- List: Rana catesbeiana Shaw, 1802; Rana pipiens – Daudin, 1802; Rana taurina Cuvier, 1817; Rana mugiens Merrem, 1820; Rana scapularis Harlan, 1826; Rana conspersa LeConte, 1855; Rana catesbyana Cope, 1889; Rana catesbyana Werner, 1909; Rana (Rana) catesbeiana – Boulenger, 1920; Rana nantaiwuensis Hsü, 1930; Rana mugicus Angel, 1947; Rana catesbyana Smith, 1978; Rana (Rana) catesbeiana Dubois, 1987; Rana (Aquarana) catesbeiana Dubois, 1992; Rana (Novirana, Aquarana) catesbeiana Hillis & Wilcox, 2005; Lithobates (Aquarana) catesbeianus Dubois, 2006; Rana (Lithobates) catesbeiana Fouquette and Dubois, 2014

= American bullfrog =

Species of amphibian

The American bullfrog (Lithobates catesbeianus), often simply known as the bullfrog in Canada and the United States, is a species of large frog in the family Ranidae (true frogs). The species is native to eastern North America. It typically inhabits large permanent water bodies such as swamps, ponds, and lakes. The bullfrog can also be found in manmade habitats such as pools, koi ponds, canals, ditches, reservoirs and culverts. The bullfrog gets its common name from the sound the male makes during the breeding season, which sounds similar to a bull bellowing. It is a generalist carnivore, consuming a wide variety of prey. In turn, it is eaten by predators such as alligators, snakes, and birds.

The bullfrog is large and is commonly eaten by humans throughout its range, especially in the southern United States where it is plentiful. Its use as a food source has led to the bullfrog being introduced outside of its native range. The bullfrog has been introduced in more than 40 countries and many continents including the Western United States, the Caribbean, South America, Western Europe, Belgium, Italy, Spain, Greece, China, Japan, South Korea, Malaysia, Southeast Asia, and more. In these places it is considered an invasive species due to its voracious appetite and the large number of eggs it produces, which has a negative effect on native amphibians, certain insects and other fauna. The bullfrog is very skittish, which can make its capture difficult, and thus it often becomes established.

Other than for food, the bullfrog is also used for dissection in science classes. Albino bullfrogs are sometimes kept as pets, and bullfrog tadpoles are often sold at ponds or fish stores.

== Taxonomy and etymology ==
The specific name, catesbeiana (feminine) or catesbeianus (masculine), is in honor of English naturalist Mark Catesby. Some authorities use the scientific name, Lithobates catesbeianus, although others prefer Rana catesbeiana.

Cladogram of the position of the American bullfrog within Lithobates, after Martínez‐Gil et al. 2025:

- - Lithobates
    - L. sylvaticus (wood frog)
    - - - L. septentrionalis (mink frog)
        - - L. grylio (pig frog)
          - - - L. clamitans (green frog)
              - L. okaloosae (Florida bog frog)
            - - L. hecksheri (river frog)
              - Lithobates catesbeianus (American bullfrog)
      - ⊞Lithobates spp. (incl. type species L. palmipes)
        ⊟
        - - - L. maculatus (highland frog)
            - - L. warszewitschii (Warszewitsch's frog)
              - L. vibicaria (green-eyed/Rancho Redondo frog)
          - - - L. vaillanti (Vaillant's frog)
              - L. juliani (Maya Mountains frog)
            - - L. bwana (Rio Chipillico frog)
              - L. palmipes (Amazon River frog)
        - - - L. sierramadrensis (Sierra Madre frog)
            - L. tarahumarae (Tarahumara frog)
          - - - L. pipiens (northern leopard frog)
              - - L. chiricahuensis (Chiricahua leopard frog)
                - - L. montezumae (Montezuma leopard frog)
                  - L. dunni (Patzcuaro frog)
            - - - L. palustris (pickerel frog)
                - - L. areolatus (crawfish frog)
                  - - L. sevosus (Mississippi gopher frog)
                    - L. capito (gopher frog)
              - - - L. sphenocephalus (southern leopard frog)
                  - - L. blairi (plains leopard frog)
                    - L. berlandieri (Rio Grande leopard frog)
                - - L. macroglossa (Guatemala plateau frog)
                  - - - L. forreri (Forrer's grass frog)
                      - L. omiltemanus (Guerreran leopard frog)
                    - - L. magnaocularis (Northwest Mexico leopard frog)
                      - - L. onca (relict leopard frog)
                        - L. yavapaiensis (lowland leopard frog)
- Rana

== Description ==
The dorsal (upper) surface of the bullfrog has an olive-green background color, either plain or with mottling and banding of grayish brown. The ventral (under) surface is off-white blotched with yellow or gray. Often, a marked contrast in color is seen between the green upper lip and the pale lower lip. The teeth are tiny and are useful only in grasping. The eye is prominent with a brown iris and a horizontal, almond-shaped pupil. The tympanum (eardrum) is easily seen just behind the eye, and a dorsolateral fold of skin encloses it. The limbs are blotched or banded with gray. The fore legs are short and sturdy, and the hind legs are long. The front toes are not webbed, but the back toes have webbing between the digits with the exception of the fourth toe, which is unwebbed.

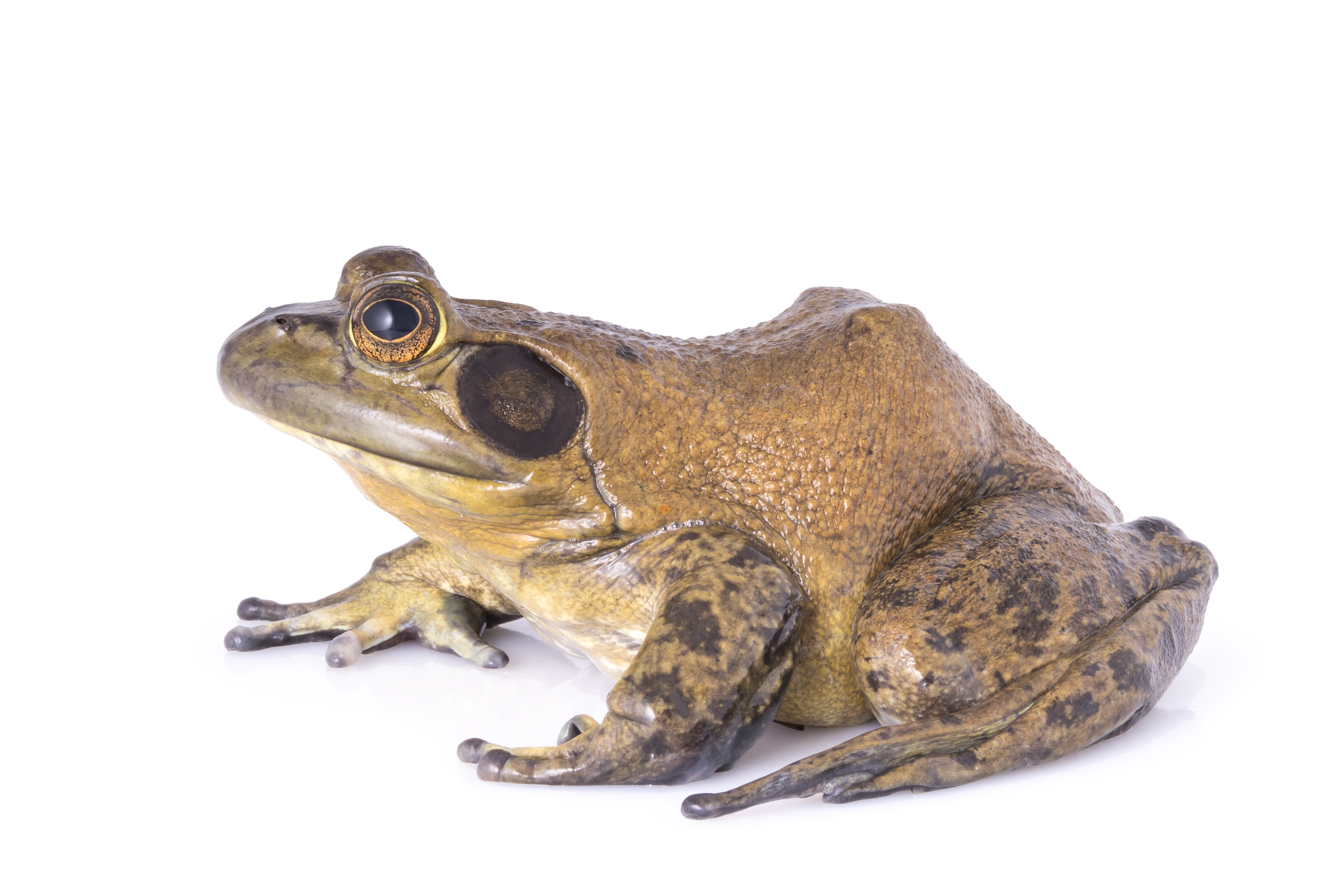
Male

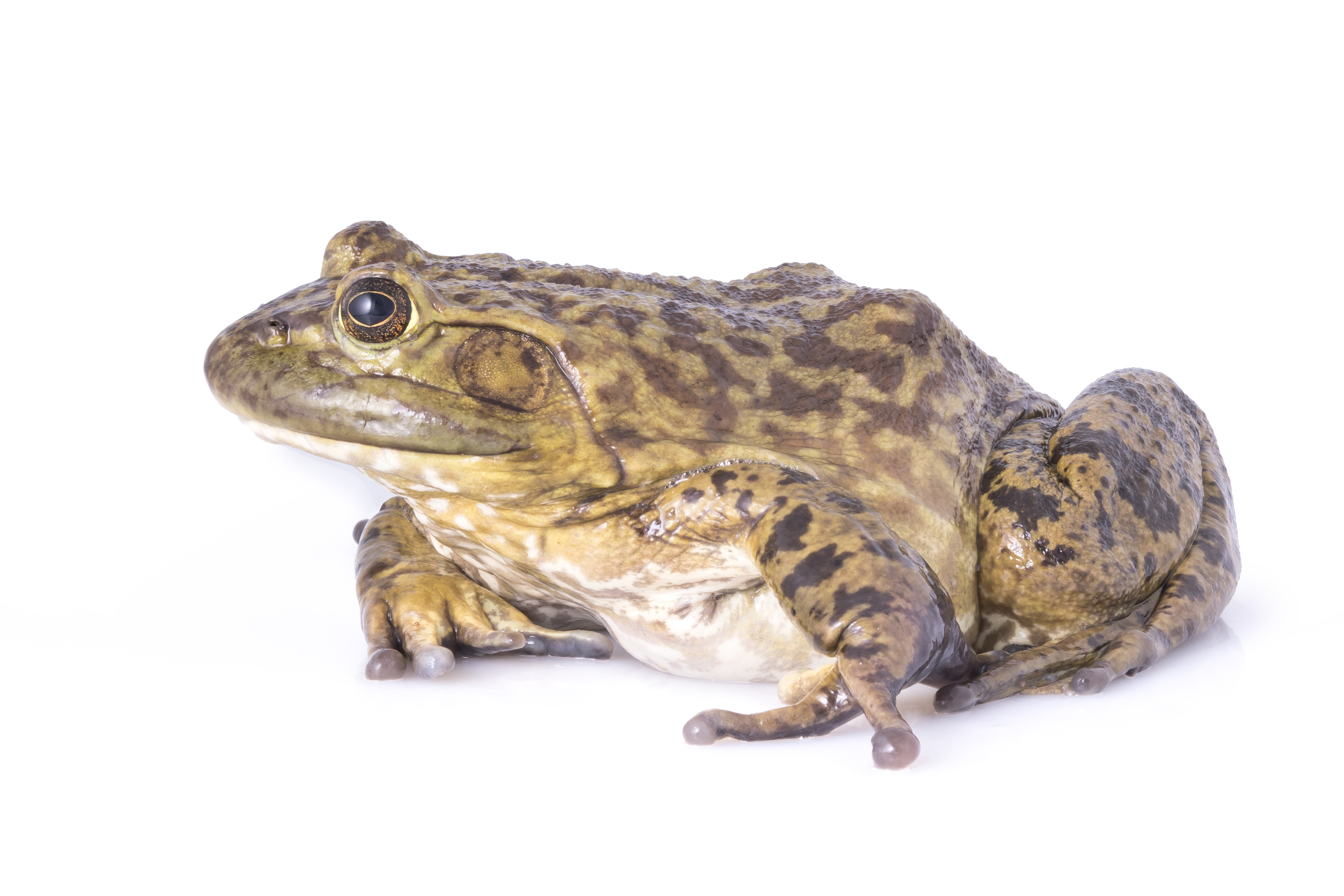
Female

The bullfrog is sexually dimorphic, with males being smaller than females and having yellow throats. Males have tympana larger than their eyes, whereas the tympana in females are about the same size as the eyes. Bullfrogs measure about 3.6 to 6 in (9 to 15 cm) in snout–to–vent length. They grow fast in the first eight months of life, typically increasing in weight from 5 to 175 g (0.18 to 6.17 oz), and large, mature individuals can weigh up to 500 g (1.1 lb). In some cases bullfrogs have been recorded as attaining 800 g (1.8 lb) and measuring up to 8 in (20 cm) from snout to vent. The American bullfrog is the largest species of true frog in North America.

== Geographic distribution ==
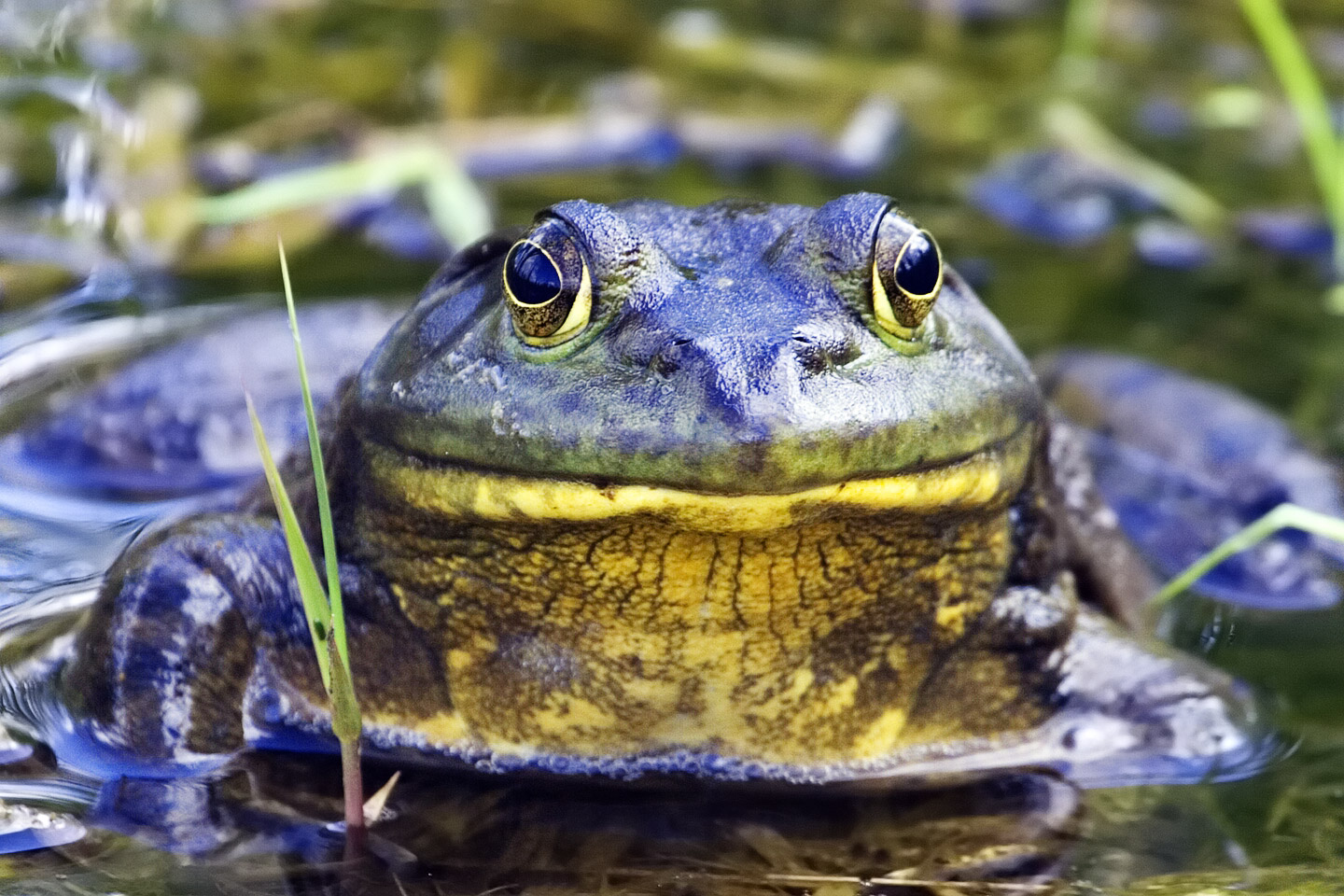
In typical aquatic habitat

The bullfrog is originally native to eastern North America, where it is commonly found in every U.S. state east of the Mississippi River. Its natural range extends from the eastern Canadian Maritime Provinces to as far west as Idaho and Texas, and as far north as Michigan (including the Upper Peninsula), Minnesota and Montana; it is largely absent in North Dakota.

Within North America, the bullfrog has been introduced to Nantucket island, as well as portions of the western U.S., including Arizona, California, Colorado, Idaho, Nevada, New Mexico, Oregon, Utah, Washington and Wyoming. In these states, it is considered to be an invasive species, as concerns exist that it may outcompete or prey upon native species of reptiles and amphibians, disrupting the delicate ecological balance of certain areas. It is very common on the West Coast, especially in California, where it is believed to pose a threat to the California red-legged frog, and is considered to be a factor in the decline of that vulnerable species. Bullfrogs have been found to feed on the young of several snakes, including the California endemic giant garter snake, a threatened species. In early 2023, the Utah Department of Natural Resources began tweeting tips on how to catch and cook bullfrogs in an effort to encourage residents to help control the growing population by catching the invasive frogs for food.

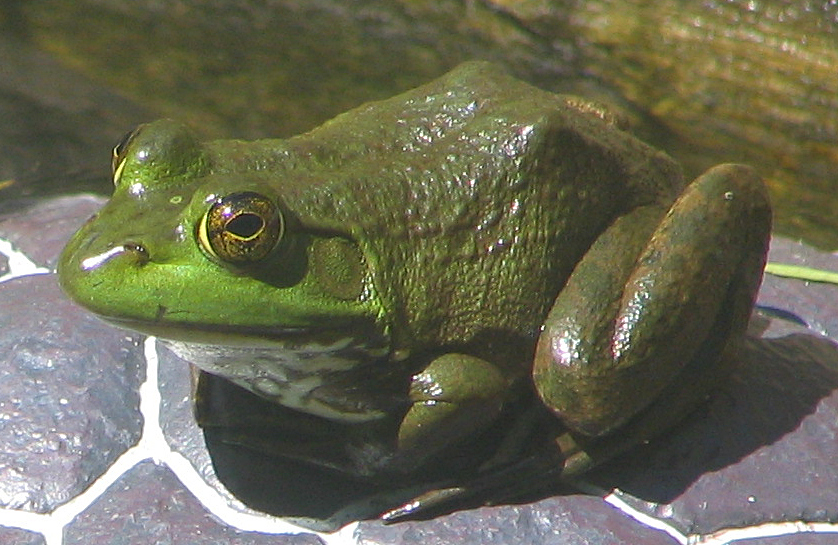
Female American bullfrog

The bullfrog has also been introduced to Hawaii, South America, Asia, the Caribbean, and Europe for various purposes including frog farming and population control of other species. Specifically, the bullfrog has been introduced to the extreme south of British Columbia, Canada, nearly every state in Mexico, as well as Belgium, Cuba, the Dominican Republic, Haiti, Italy, Jamaica, the Netherlands, and Puerto Rico. It is also found in Argentina, Brazil, China, Colombia, Japan, South Korea, Uruguay and Venezuela. The reasons for introducing the bullfrog to these areas have largely been intentional, either to provide humans with a source of food or as biological control agents. In addition, the unintended escape of frogs from breeding establishments or scientific research facilities, captive escapees or released pets are also a possibility. Conservationists are concerned that the bullfrog is relatively immune to the fungal infection chytridiomycosis (also called 'chytrid' fungus) which has been ravaging numerous frog species: as it invades new territories, it may assist in the spread of this lethal fungus as an asymptomatic carrier, spreading the fungus to more susceptible, native species of frog it encounters.

== Biology ==
=== Ecology ===
The bullfog is a voracious, opportunistic, ambush predator that preys on any small animal it can overpower and consume. Bullfrog stomachs have been found to contain rodents, small lizards and snakes, other frogs and toads, other amphibians, crayfish, other crustaceans, small birds, scorpions, tarantulas and bats (such as big brown bats, eastern red bats, southeastern myotis, and other unidentified bats), as well as the many types of invertebrates, such as snails, worms and insects, which are the usual food of ranid frogs. These studies revealed the bullfrog's diet to be unique among North American ranids in the inclusion of a large percentage of aquatic animals, such as fish, tadpoles, ram's horn snails, and dytiscid beetles, as well as the aquatic eggs of fish, frogs, insects, or salamanders. Cannibalism has been observed in bullfrog populations in resource-limited environments. The bullfrog is able to capture large, strong prey because of the powerful grip of its jaws after the initial ranid tongue strike. However, there is a correlation found with size of prey relative to body size of the bullfrog. Juveniles and adults typically go after prey that is relative to their own body size. The bullfrog is able to make allowance for light refraction at the water-air interface by striking at a position posterior to the target's perceived location. The comparative ability of the bullfrog to capture submerged prey, compared to that of the green frog, leopard frog, and wood frog (Lithobates clamitans, Lithobates pipiens, and Lithobates sylvaticus, respectively) was also demonstrated in laboratory experiments.

Prey motion elicits feeding behavior. First, if necessary, the frog performs a single, orienting bodily rotation ending with the frog aimed towards the prey, followed by approaching leaps, if necessary. Once within striking distance, the bullfrog begins its feeding strike, which consists of a ballistic lunge (eyes closed as during all leaps) that ends with the mouth opening. At this stage, the fleshy, mucus-coated tongue is extended towards the prey, often engulfing it, while the jaws continue their forward travel to close (bite) just as the tongue is retracted. Large prey that do not fit entirely into the mouth are stuffed in with the hands. In laboratory observations, bullfrogs taking mice usually swam underwater with prey in mouth, apparently with the advantageous result of altering the mouse's defense from counter-attack to struggling for air. Asphyxiation is the most likely cause of death of warm-blooded prey.

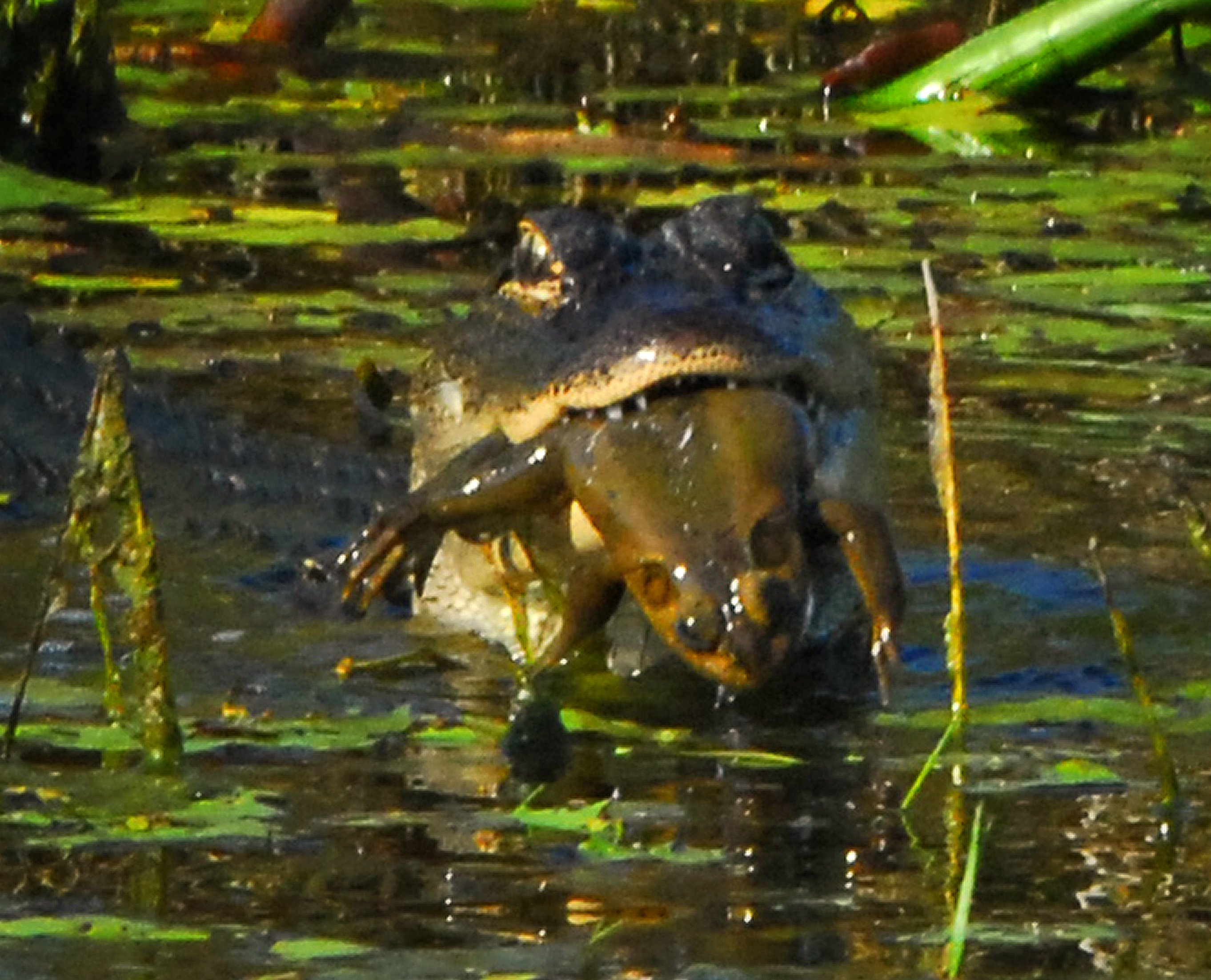
An American alligator (Alligator mississippiensis) feeding on a bullfrog

The bullfrog is an important item of prey for many birds (especially large herons), the North American river otter (Lontra canadensis), predatory fish, and occasionally other amphibians. Predators of the American bullfrog once in its adult stage can range in weight from 150 g (5.3 oz) belted kingfishers (Megaceryle alcyon) to 1,100 lb (500 kg) American alligators (Alligator mississippiensis). The eggs and larvae are unpalatable to many salamanders and fish, but the high levels of activity of the tadpoles may make them more noticeable to a predator not deterred by their unpleasant taste. Humans hunt bullfrogs as game and consume their legs. Adult frogs try to escape by splashing and leaping into deep water. A trapped individual may squawk or emit a piercing scream, which may surprise the attacker sufficiently for the frog to escape. An attack on one bullfrog is likely to alert others in the vicinity to danger and they will all retreat into the safety of deeper water. Bullfrogs may be at least partially resistant to the venom of copperhead (Agkistrodon contortrix) and cottonmouth (Agkistrodon piscivorus) snakes, though these species are known natural predators of bullfrogs as are northern water snakes (Nerodia sipedon).

==== As an invasive species ====
Multiple traits of L. catesbeianus contribute to its competitive ability, especially as an invasive. The generalist diet of the American bullfrog allows for it to consume food in different environments. They directly predate indigenous frog species, leading to numerous frog declines. When observing the contents of American bullfrog stomachs, it was discovered that adult bullfrogs regularly consume predators of bullfrog young, including dragonfly nymphs, garter snakes, and giant water bugs. Thus, the ecological check on American bullfrog juveniles in invaded areas become less effective. L. catesbeianus seems to exhibit traits of immunity or resistance against the antipredator defenses of other organisms, with analysis of stomach contents from New Mexican bullfrogs showing the regular consumption of wasps, with no conditioned avoidance due to the wasps' stingers. Along the Colorado river, L. catesbeianus stomach contents indicate the ability to withstand the discomforting spines of the stickleback fish. Reports of American bullfrogs eating scorpions and rattlesnakes also exist.

Analysis of the American bullfrog's realized niche at various sites in Mexico, and comparisons with the niches of endemic frogs show that it is possible that the American bullfrog capable of niche shift, and pose a threat to many endemic Mexican frog species, even those that are not currently in competition with the American bullfrog.

Self-sustaining populations of American bullfrogs became established in the United Kingdom around 1999, where their introduction was likely due to accidental escapes and deliberate releases from captivity. These populations appear to be quite small, and are undergoing control by Natural England as the species poses a threat to native amphibians.

The American bullfrog has been known to spread the amphibian pathogen Batrachochytrium dendrobatidis among populations that it has been introduced to.

=== Breeding season ===
The bullfrog breeding season typically lasts two to three months. A study of bullfrogs in Michigan showed the males arriving at the breeding site in late May or early June, and remaining in the area into July. The territorial males that occupy sites are usually spaced some 3 to 6 m (9.8 to 19.7 ft) apart and call loudly. At least three different types of calls have been noted in male bullfrogs under different circumstances. These distinctive calls include territorial calls made as threats to other males, advertisement calls made to attract females, and encounter calls which precede combat.

The males continuously engage in sexual activity throughout the long breeding season. Though the reproductive cycle of American bullfrogs in Oregon is mainly restricted to the summer season when individuals congregate in lentic freshwater systems. Males are present at the breeding pond for longer periods than females during the entire season, increasing their chances of multiple matings. The sex ratio is typically skewed toward males. Which might lead to some interspecific amplexus events with other North American frogs Conversely, females have brief periods of sexual receptivity during the season. In one study, female sexual activity typically lasted for a single night and mating did not occur unless the females initiated the physical contact. Males only clasp females after they have indicated their willingness to mate. This finding refutes previous claims that a male frog will clasp any proximate female with no regard to whether the female has consented. Once a male finds a receptive female he will clasp onto her and undergo inguinal amplexus — a reproductive position — using his forelimbs. The enlargement of forelimb muscles is a sexually dimorphic trait seen in the male bullfrog. One study investigating male and female bullfrog forelimbs muscles found males had significantly stronger muscles that could undergo longer durations of activity before the onset of fatigue. The significance of forelimb sexual dimorphism allow males to remain in amplexus with the female for longer durations increasing their chance at reproductive success in the highly competitive mating environment. Females can deposit 1,000 - 40,000 eggs which hatch in 3 - 5 days.

These male and female behaviors cause male-male competition to be high within the bullfrog population and sexual selection for the females to be an intense process. Kentwood Wells postulated leks, territorial polygyny, and harems are the most likely classifications for the bullfrog mating system. Leks would be a valid description because males congregate to attract females, and the females arrive to the site for the purpose of copulation. In a 1980 study on bullfrogs in New Jersey, the mating system was classified as resource-defense polygyny. The males defended territories within the group and demonstrated typical physical forms of defense.

==== Choruses ====
Male bullfrogs aggregate into groups called choruses. The male chorus behavior is analogous to the lek formation of birds, mammals, and other vertebrates. Choruses are dynamic, forming and remaining associated for a few days, breaking down temporarily, and then forming again in a new area with a different group of males. Male movement has experimentally been noted to be dynamic. In the Michigan study, the choruses were described as "centers of attraction" in which their larger numbers enhanced the males' overall acoustical displays. This is more attractive to females and also attractive to other sexually active males. Choruses in this study were dynamic, constantly forming and breaking up. New choruses were formed in other areas of the site. Males moved around and were highly mobile within the choruses.

A review of multiple studies on bullfrogs and other anurans noted male behavior within the groups changes according to the population density of the leks. At higher population densities, leks are favored due to the difficulty in defending individual territories among a large population of males. This variance causes differences in how females choose their mates. When the male population density is low and males maintain clearer, more distinct territories, female choice is mostly determined by territory quality. When male population density is higher, females depend on other cues to select their mates. These cues include the males' positions within the chorus and differences in male display behaviors among other determinants. Social dominance within the choruses is established through challenges, threats, and other physical displays. Older males tend to acquire more central locations while younger males were restricted to the periphery.

Chorus tenure is the number of nights that a male participates in the breeding chorus. One study distinguishes between chorus tenure and dominant tenure. Dominant tenure is more strictly defined as the amount of time a male maintains a dominant status. Chorus tenure is restricted due to increased risk of predation, lost foraging opportunities, and higher energy consumption. Calling is postulated to be energetically costly to anurans in general. Energy is also expended through locomotion and aggressive interactions of male bullfrogs within the chorus.

==== Aggressive behavior ====
To establish social dominance within choruses, bullfrogs demonstrate various forms of aggression, especially through visual displays. Posture is a key factor in establishing social position and threatening challengers. Territorial males have inflated postures while non-territorial males remain in the water with only their heads showing. For dominant (territorial) males, their elevated posture reveals their yellow-colored throats. When two dominant males encounter each other, they engage in a wrestling bout. The males have their venters clasped, each individual in an erect position rising to well above water level. The New Jersey study noted the males would approach each other to within a few centimeters and then tilt back their heads, displaying their brilliantly colored gular sacs. The gular is dichromatic in bullfrogs, with dominant and fitter males displaying yellow gulars. The New Jersey study also reported low posture with only the head exposed above the water surface was typical of subordinate, or non-territorial males, and females. High posture was demonstrated by territorial males, which floated on the surface of the water with their lungs inflated, displaying their yellow gulars. Males optimize their reproductive fitness in a number of ways. Early arrival at the breeding site, prolonged breeding with continuous sexual activity throughout the season, ownership of a centrally located territory within the chorus, and successful movement between the dynamically changing choruses are all common ways for males to maintain dominant, or territorial, status within the chorus. Older males have greater success in all of these areas than younger males. Some of the males display a more inferior role, termed by many researchers as the silent male status. These silent males adopt a submissive posture, sit near resident males and make no attempt to displace them. The silent males do not attempt to intercept females but are waiting for the territories to become vacant. This has also been called the alternate or satellite male strategy.

=== Life cycle ===
After selecting a male, the female deposits eggs in his territory. During amplexus, the male rides on top of the female, grasping her just behind her fore limbs. The female chooses a site in shallow water among vegetation, and lays a batch of up to 20,000 eggs, and the male simultaneously releases sperm, resulting in external fertilization. The eggs form a thin, floating sheet which may cover an area of 0.5 to 1.0 m^{2} (5.4 to 10.8 sq ft). The embryos develop best at water temperatures between 24 and 30 °C (75 and 86 °F) and hatch in three to five days.

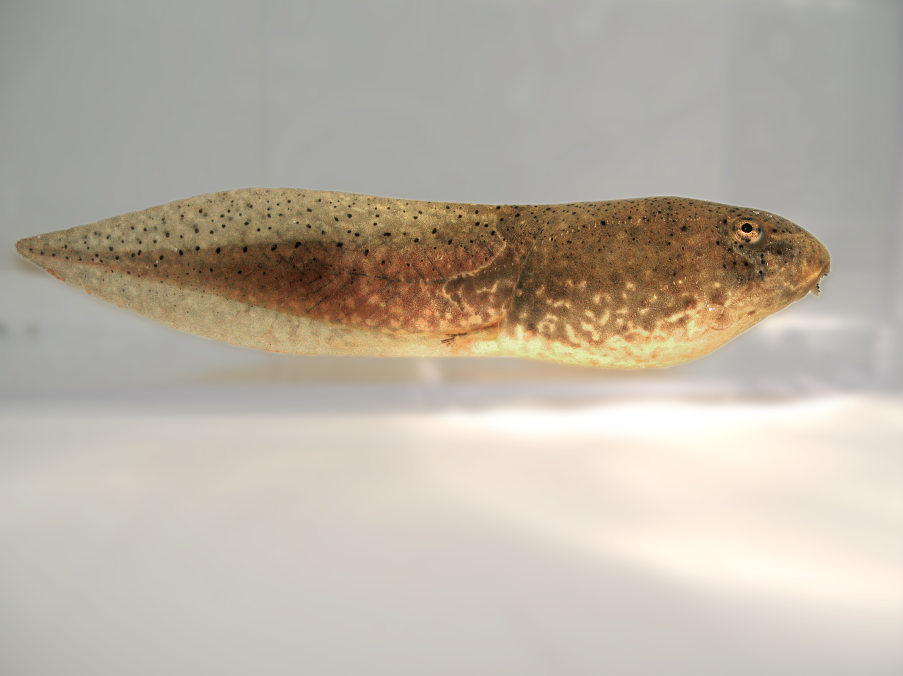
Tadpole

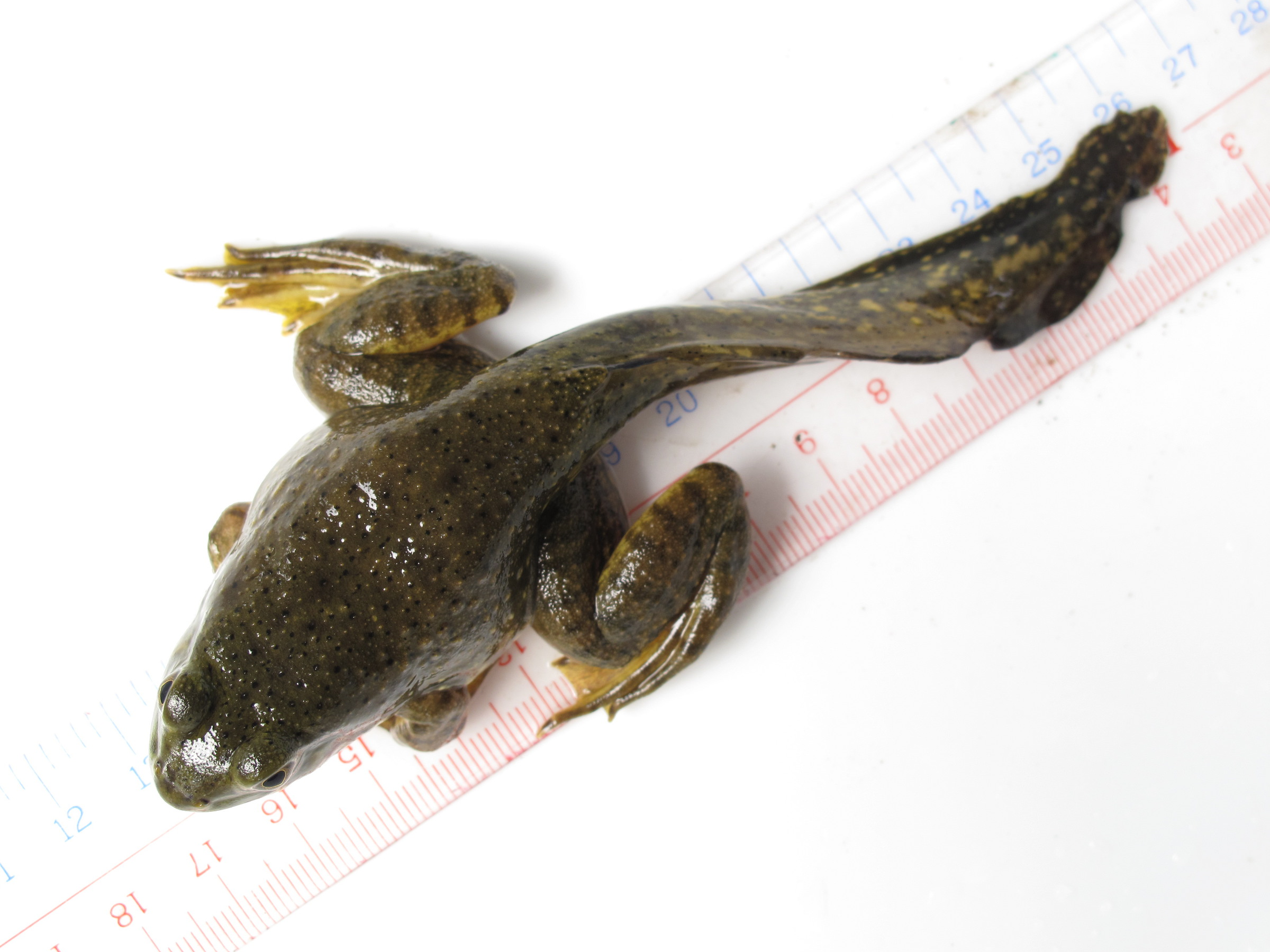
Froglet with tail

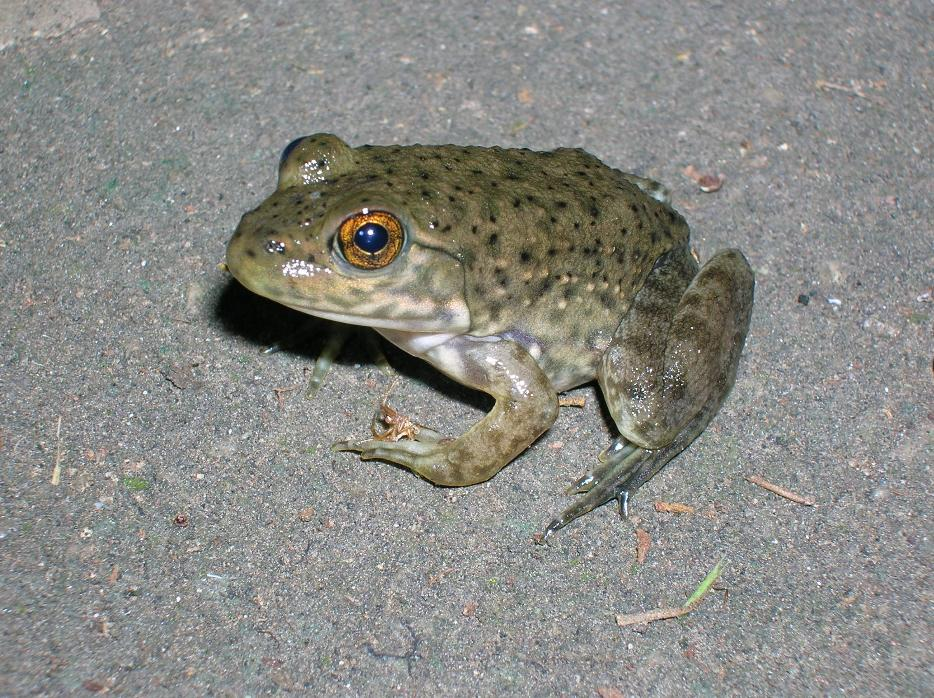
Juvenile with a small, grey, oval-shaped area on top of the head, the parietal eye

If the water temperature rises above 32 °C (90 °F), developmental abnormalities occur, and if it falls below 15 °C (59 °F), normal development ceases. Newly hatched tadpoles show a preference for living in shallow water on fine gravel bottoms. American bullfrog tadpoles have also "showed a preference for habitats containing structure." This may reflect a lesser number of predators in these locations. As they grow, they tend to move into deeper water. The tadpoles initially have three pairs of external gills and several rows of labial teeth. They pump water through their gills by movements of the floor of their mouths, trapping bacteria, single-celled algae, protozoans, pollen grains, and other small particles on mucus in a filtration organ in their pharynges. As they grow, they begin to ingest larger particles and use their teeth for rasping. They have downward-facing mouths, deep bodies, and tails with broad dorsal and ventral fins.

Time to metamorphosis ranges from a few months in the southern part of the range to 3 years in the north, where the colder water slows development. Maximum lifespan in the wild is estimated to be 8 to 10 years, but one frog lived for almost 16 years in captivity.

== Relation to humans ==
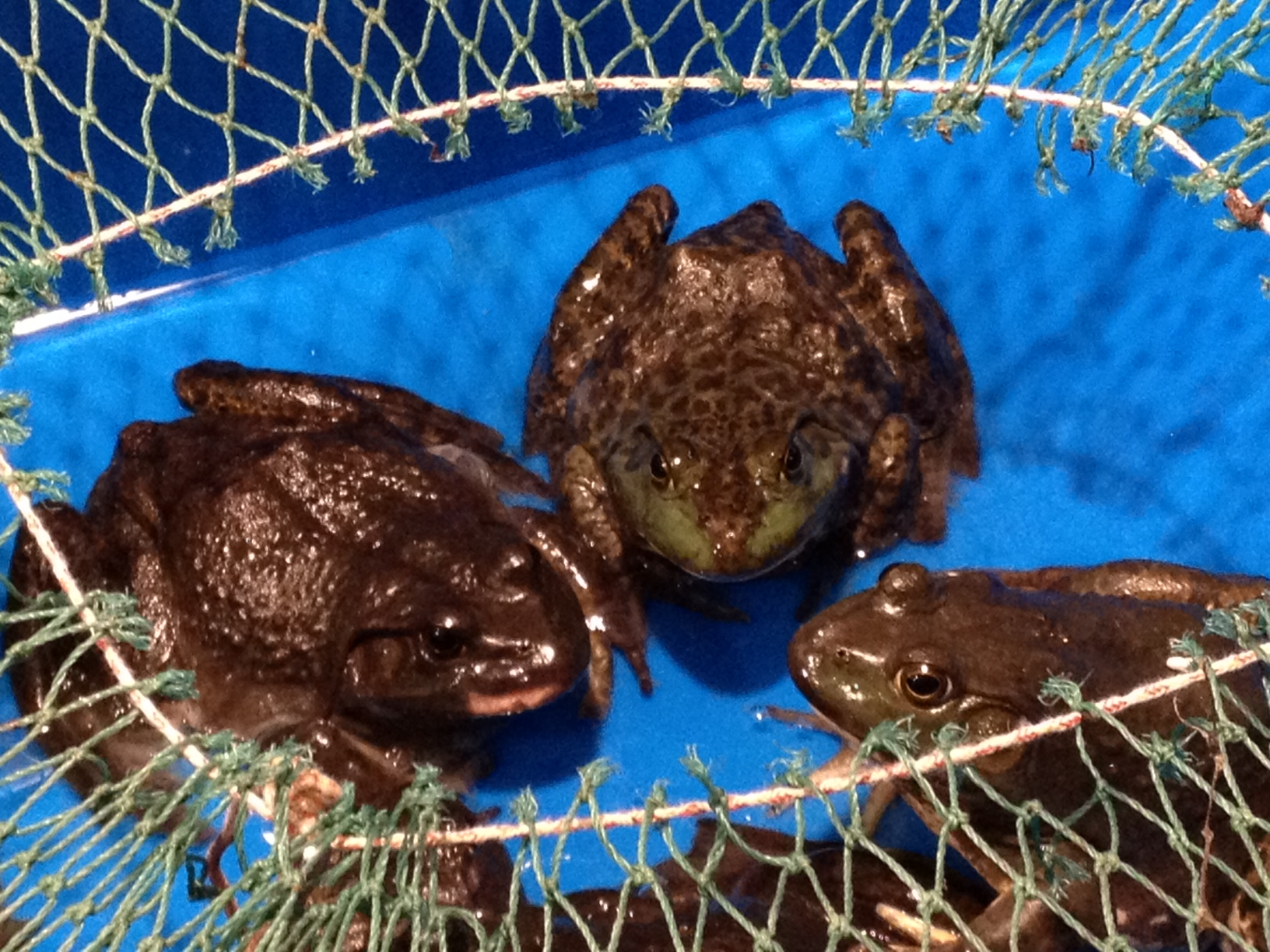
Bullfrogs in a supermarket in China.

The American bullfrog provides a food source, especially in the Southern and some areas of the Midwestern United States. The traditional way of hunting them is to paddle or pole silently by canoe or flatboat in ponds or swamps at night; when the frog's call is heard, a light is shone at the frog which temporarily inhibits its movement. The frog will not jump into deeper water as long as it is approached slowly and steadily. When close enough, the frog is gigged with a multiple-tined spear and brought into the boat. Bullfrogs can also be stalked on land, by again taking great care not to startle them. In some states, breaking the skin while catching them is illegal, and either grasping gigs or hand captures are used. Like most frogs, the hind legs of the bullfrog are the only parts generally eaten. When cooked, they resemble small chicken drumsticks, have a similar flavor and texture and can be prepared in similar ways.

Commercial bullfrog culture in near-natural enclosed ponds has been attempted, but is fraught with difficulties. Although pelleted feed is available, frogs usually will not willingly consume artificial diets, and providing sufficient live prey is challenging. Disease among frogs also tends to be a problem even when great care is taken to provide sanitary conditions. Other challenges to be overcome may be predation, cannibalism, and low water quality. The frogs are large, have powerful leaps, and inevitably escape after which they may wreak havoc among the native frog population. Countries that export bullfrog legs include the Netherlands, Belgium, Mexico, Bangladesh, Japan, China, Taiwan, and Indonesia. Most of these frogs are caught in the wild, but some are raised in captivity. The United States is a net importer of frog legs.

During the Great Depression, businessman Dr. Albert Broel promoted bullfrog farming as a way for people experiencing difficult economic times to earn extra money by raising and selling bullfrogs. He published several instructional manuals, including "Frog Raising for Pleasure and Profit," as well as in-person training services. Broel offered to purchase all the adult frogs independent breeders could successfully raise to adult weight. The scheme was, ultimately, unsuccessful for many of the reasons described above. However, the business model of outsourcing livestock raising to independent farmers continues today, especially in the poultry industry.

The American bullfrog is used as a specimen for dissection in many biology and anatomy classes in schools across the world. It is the state amphibian of Missouri, Ohio, and Oklahoma.

In areas where the American bullfrog is introduced, the population can be controlled by various means. One project (3n-Bullfrog project) uses sterile triploïd (3n) bullfrogs. In Europe, the American bullfrog is included since 2016 in the list of Invasive Alien Species of Union concern (the Union list). This means that this species cannot under any circumstances be imported, bred, transported, commercialized, or intentionally released into the environment in the whole of the European Union.

== Online Model Organism Database ==
American Bullfrog is a partially supported species on Xenbase. This includes genome download, BLAST, and JBrowse functionalities.
