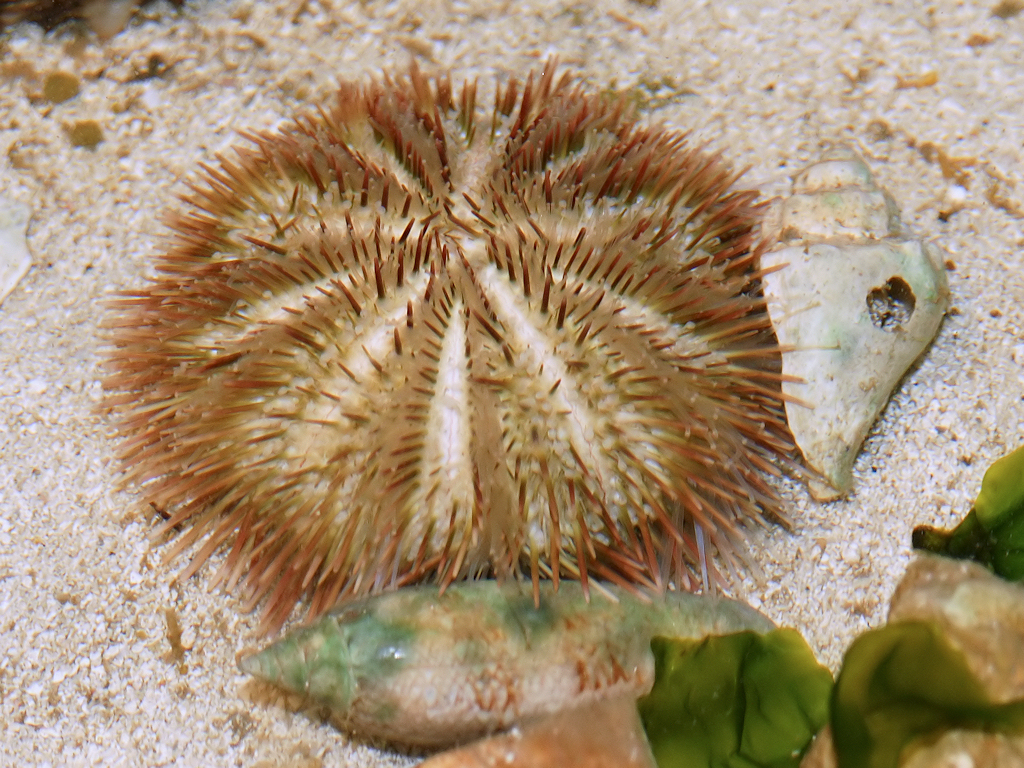
- Lytechinus variegatus

Scientific classification
- Kingdom: Animalia
- Phylum: Echinodermata
- Class: Echinoidea
- Order: Camarodonta
- Family: Toxopneustidae
- Genus: Lytechinus; A. Agassiz, 1863

= Lytechinus =

Genus of sea urchins

Lytechinus is a genus of sea urchins.

== Species ==
The following extant species are listed in this genus by the World Register of Marine Species:

- Lytechinus callipeplus H.L. Clark, 1912
- Lytechinus euerces H.L. Clark, 1912
- Lytechinus panamensis Mortensen, 1921
- Lytechinus pictus (Verrill, 1867)
- Lytechinus semituberculatus (Valenciennes in L. Agassiz, 1846)
- Lytechinus variegatus (Lamarck, 1816)
- Lytechinus williamsi Chesher, 1968
