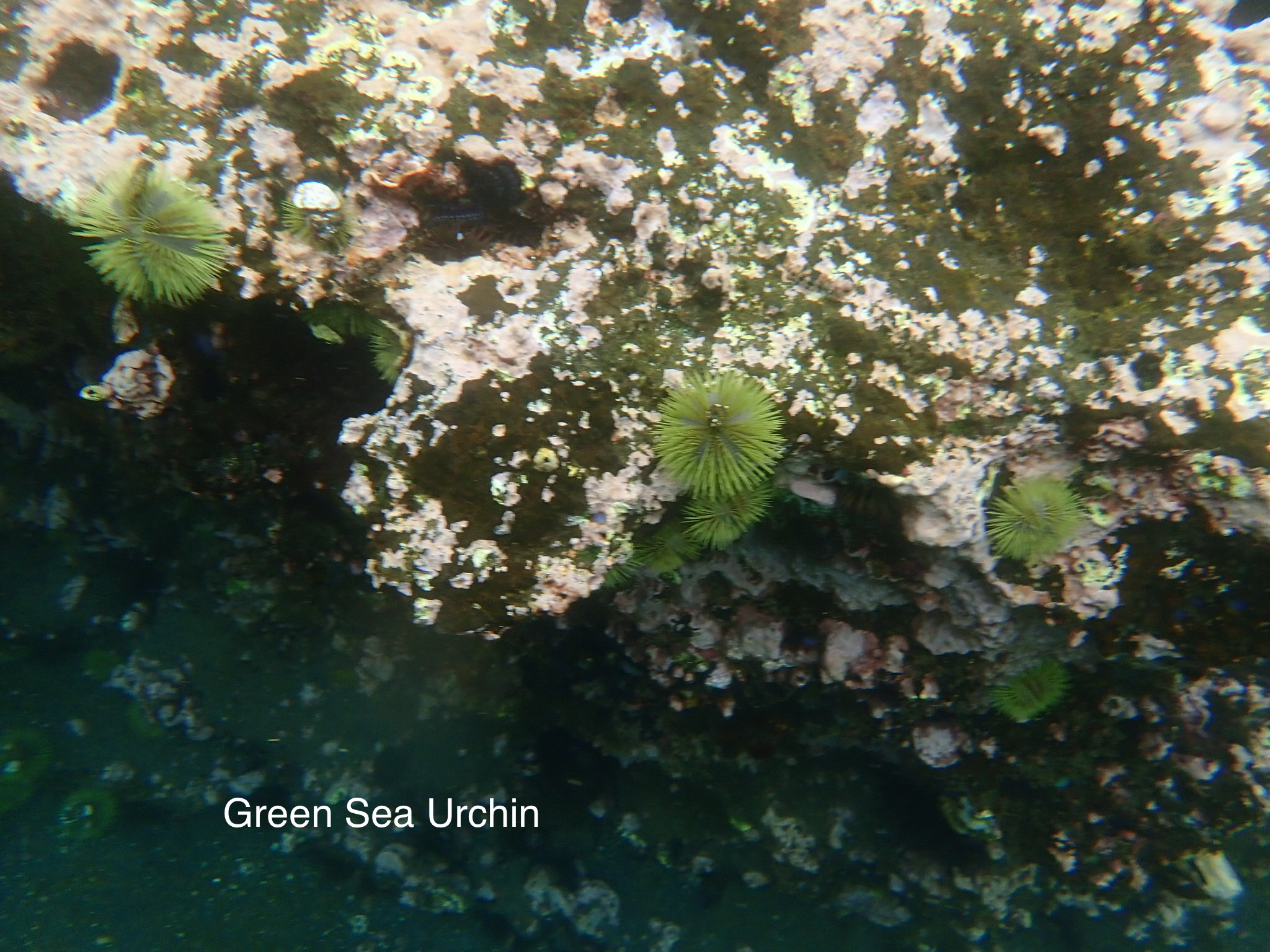

Scientific classification
- Domain: Eukaryota
- Kingdom: Animalia
- Phylum: Echinodermata
- Class: Echinoidea
- Order: Camarodonta
- Family: Toxopneustidae
- Genus: Lytechinus
- Species: L. semituberculatus

Binomial name
- Lytechinus semituberculatus (Valenciennes in L. Agassiz, 1846)

= Lytechinus semituberculatus =

Species of sea urchin

Lytechinus semituberculatus, commonly known as the green hedgehog or green sea urchin, is a sea urchin found in the coast of the Galapagos Islands. It is recognizable by its green coloration. Its conservation status is unknown.

== Gallery ==
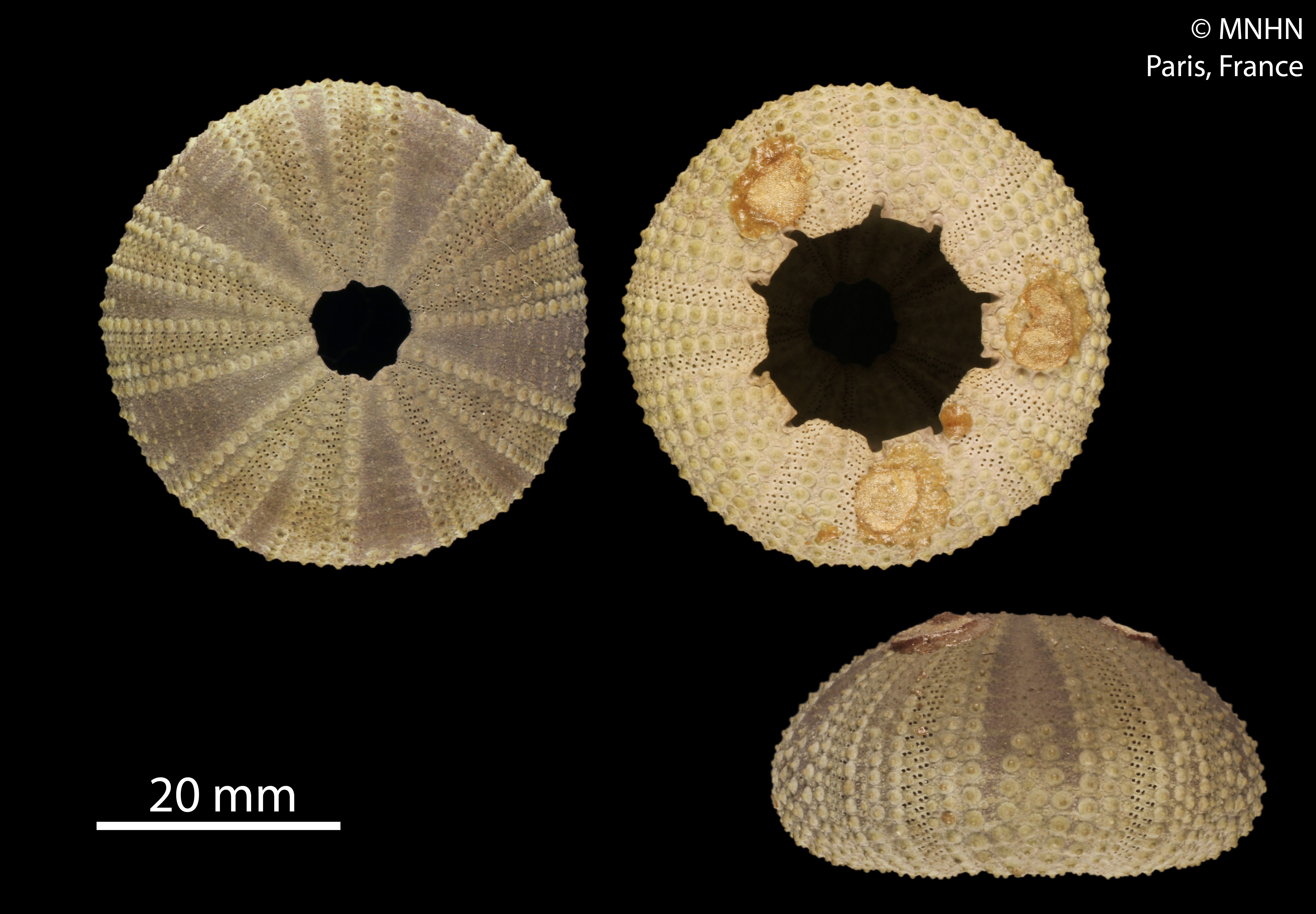
Lytechinus semituberculatus scan

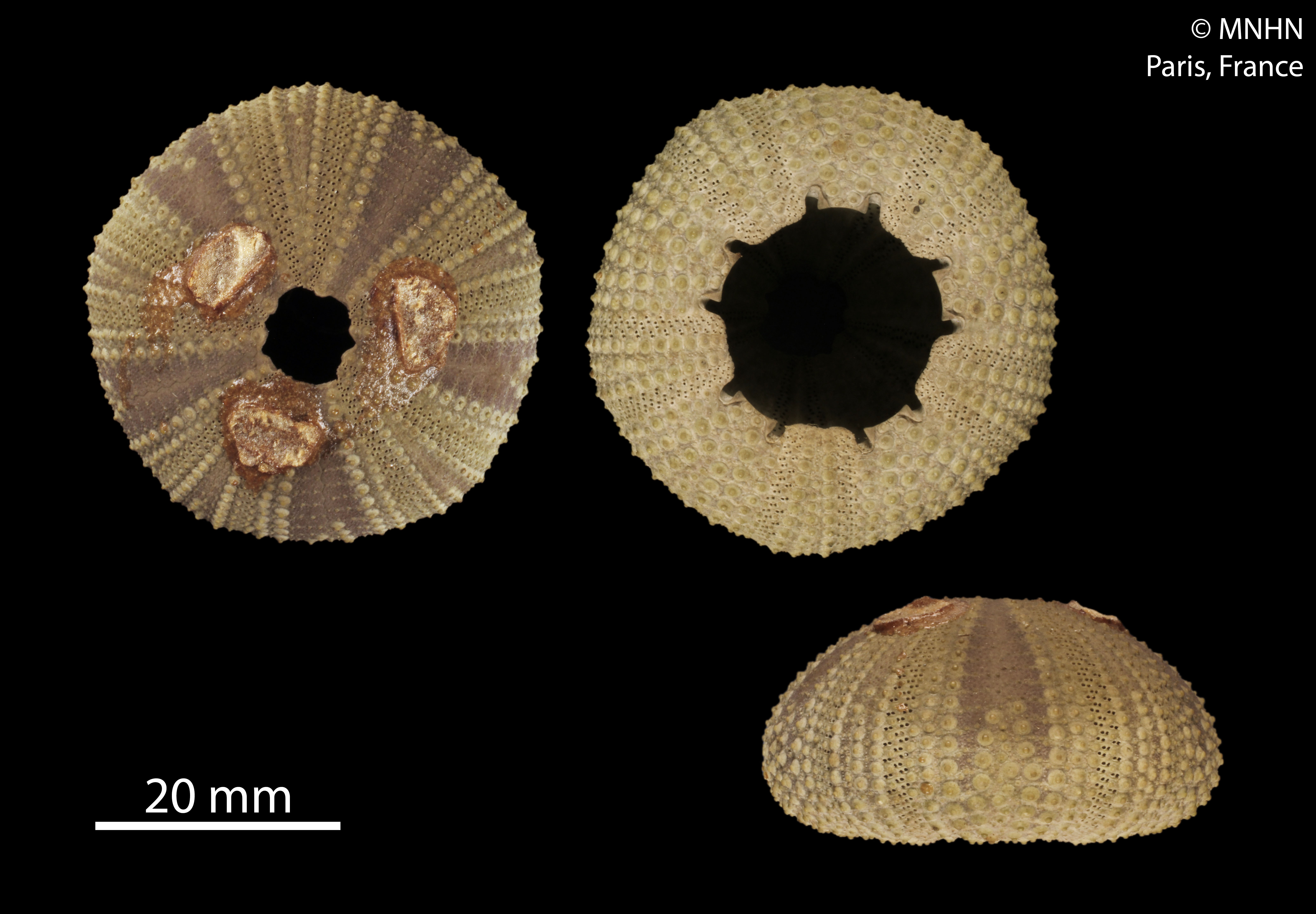
Lytechinus semituberculatus scan

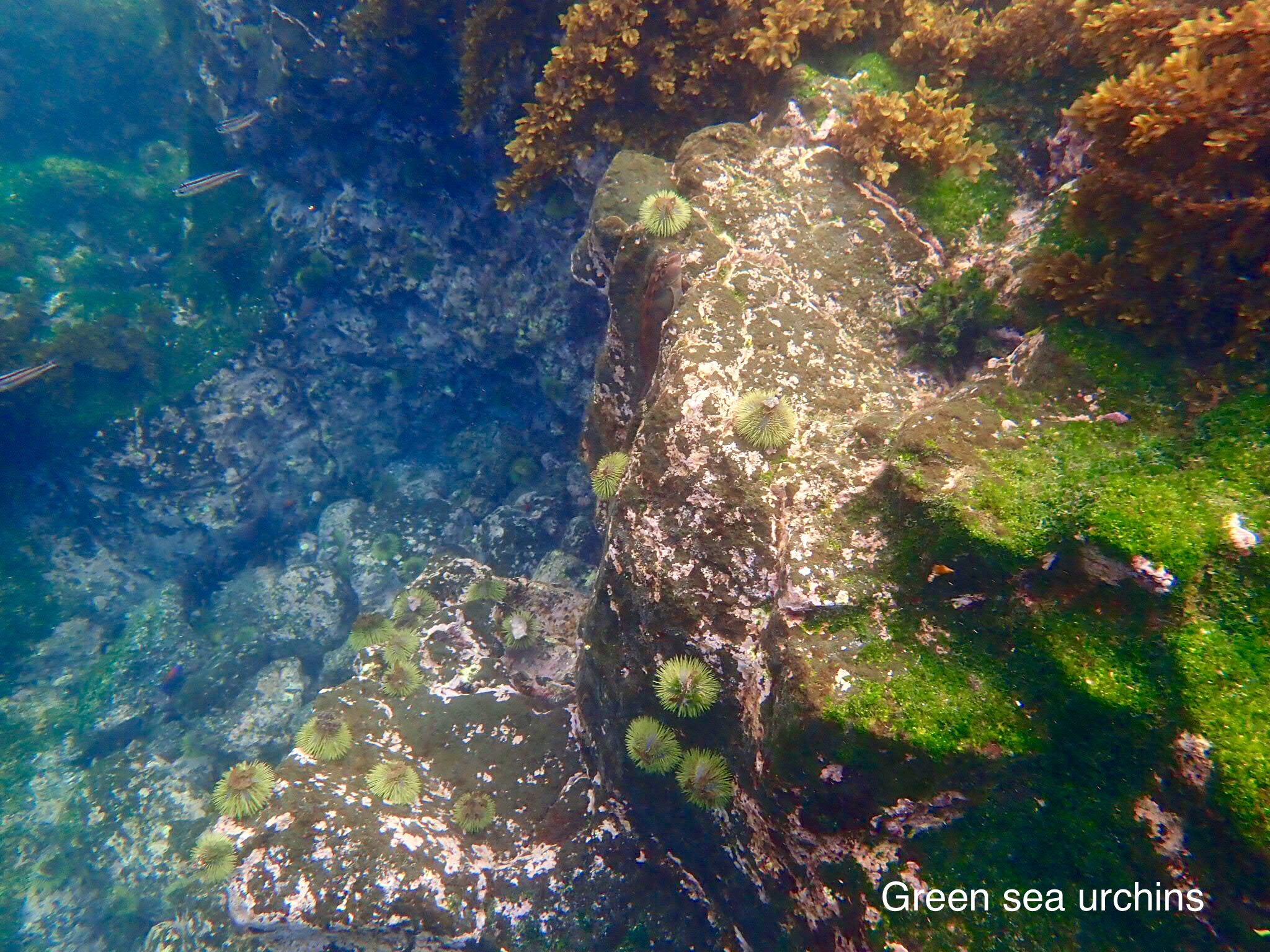
Lytechinus semituberculatus in its natural habitat
