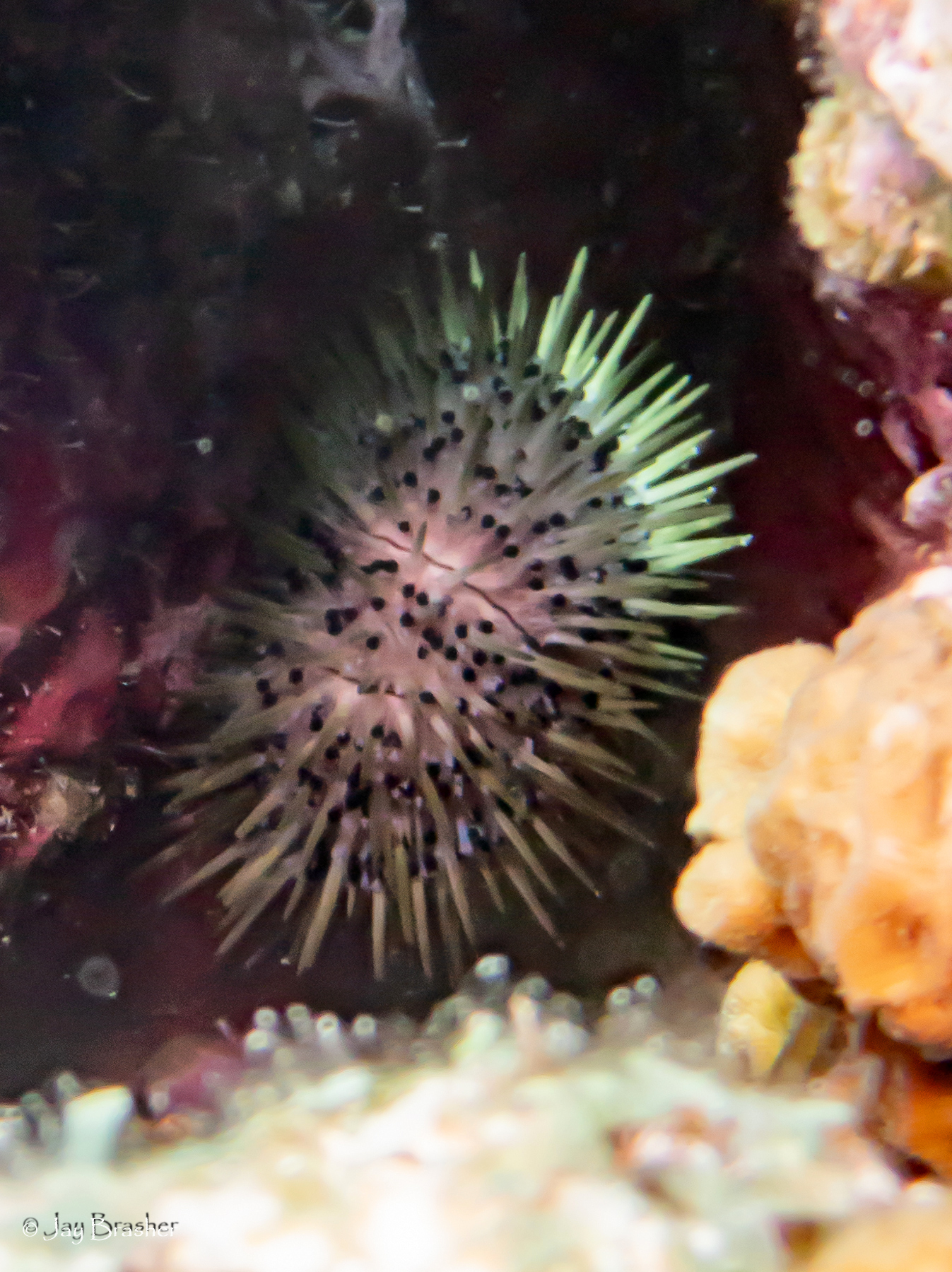

Conservation status
- Vulnerable (NatureServe)

Scientific classification
- Kingdom: Animalia
- Phylum: Echinodermata
- Class: Echinoidea
- Order: Camarodonta
- Family: Toxopneustidae
- Genus: Lytechinus
- Species: L. williamsi

Binomial name
- Lytechinus williamsi Chesher, 1968

= Lytechinus williamsi =

Species of sea urchin

Lytechinus williamsi, the jewel urchin, is a sea urchin in the family Toxopneustidae. It occurs on shallow reefs off the coasts of Panama, Belize, the Florida Keys and Jamaica.

== Description ==
The jewel urchin grows to a diameter of about 3 to 5 centimetres (1.2 to 2.0 in) and has spines up to 3 centimetres (1.2 in) long. Many of them are shorter than this and provide a dense covering. The test is usually a pale brown colour with a red or dark brown stripe along the joints of the main interambulacral plates. The spines are either deep green or white and have a ridge running along one side of each, a fact that distinguishes this species from the very similar Lytechinus variegatus. In between the spines are large purple tweezer shaped structures called pedicellariae which are also distinctive, L. variegatus having white pedicellariae.

== Distribution and habitat ==
The jewel urchin is the commonest sea urchin on some coral reefs in the Caribbean Sea but it seems to be restricted to the coasts of Panama, Belize, the Florida Keys and Jamaica at depths between 5 and 90 metres (16 and 295 ft). It is found in crevices in rocks and coral reefs and on the surfaces of other organisms such as table corals, Acropora spp., and lettuce corals in the family Agariciidae. It does not feed on these corals.

== Biology ==
The jewel urchin does not protect itself from the sun by covering its upper surface with bits of seagrass and shell but instead, tends to hide in cracks during the day and emerge to feed at night. Like other sea urchins, the diet is mainly algae which are scraped off the surface of rocks or chewed by the rasping mouthparts situated on the oral (under) surface of the animal.

In Panama the jewel urchin's spawning period occurs annually in the rainy season. It occurs over an extended period and does not seem to be linked with phases of the moon as is the case in some other species of sea urchin.
