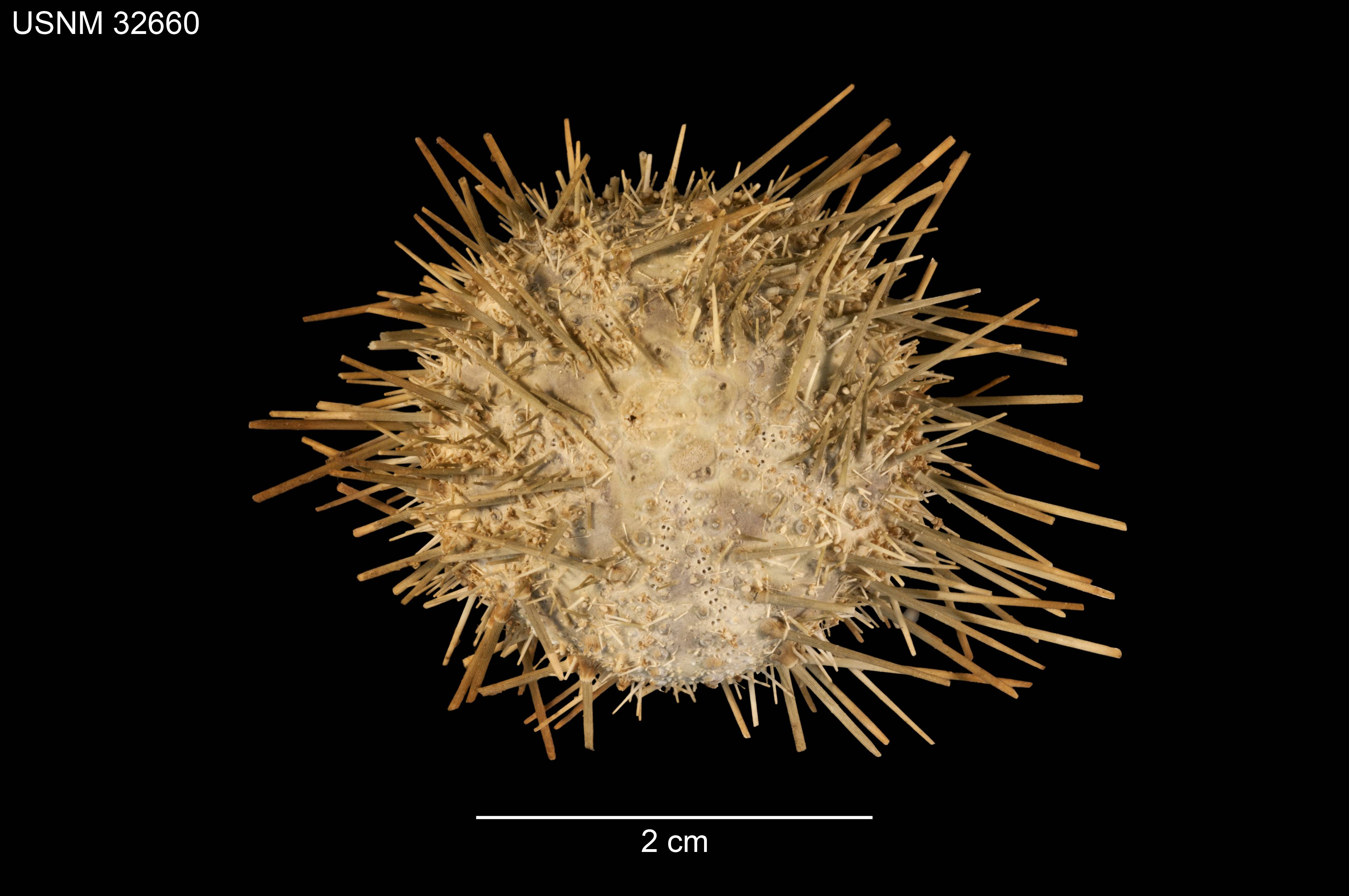

Scientific classification
- Kingdom: Animalia
- Phylum: Echinodermata
- Class: Echinoidea
- Order: Camarodonta
- Family: Toxopneustidae
- Genus: Lytechinus
- Species: L. pictus

Binomial name
- Lytechinus pictus (Verrill, 1867)

Synonyms
- Lytechinus anamesus H.L. Clark, 1912; Psammechinus pictus Verrill, 1867

= Lytechinus pictus =

Species of sea urchin

Lytechinus pictus, commonly known as the painted urchin, is a sea urchin in the family Toxopneustidae. It occurs on shallow reefs in the tropical and subtropical eastern Pacific Ocean, off the coasts of California, Central America and South America as far south as Ecuador.

== Taxonomy ==
This sea urchin was first described in 1867 by the American zoologist Addison Emery Verrill who gave it the name Psammechinus pictus. It was later transferred to the genus Lytechinus and became Lytechinus pictus. In 1912, another species Lytechinus anamesus was described by American zoologist Hubert Lyman Clark as Lytechinus anamesus. He was the curator of echinoderms at the Museum of Comparative Zoology at Harvard University at the time. It had long been suspected that L. pictus and L. anamesus were synonymous, and this was confirmed by analysis of mitochondrial DNA in 2004.

== Description ==
The test of this sea urchin is up to 40 mm (1.6 in) in diameter. The general colour is greyish or pale straw brown, sometimes with a pinkish flush. The spines are robust, short and blunt, the basal half of each spine usually being white while the rest of the spine varies in colour. Juvenile urchins sometimes have banded spines.

== Online model organism database ==
Echinobase is the model organism database for the painted urchin and a number of other echinoderms.

== Distribution and habitat ==
Lytechinus pictus is found in the tropical and subtropical eastern Pacific Ocean at depths down to about 300 m (1,000 ft). Its range extends from central California southwards to Ecuador. In California it tends to inhabit the middle and lower intertidal zone but in the northern part of the Gulf of California it mainly inhabits the subtidal zone.

These sea urchins tend to form dense aggregations at the edge of, or inside, the kelp beds that line this coast. At San Onofre, California in 1978–79, the density of individuals close to the kelp beds was recorded at 80 per square metre while inside the kelp bed it was 40. At Anacapa Island, California, the highest densities (36 per sq.m.) were found in barren areas with coralline algae near the kelp beds.

== Ecology ==
This sea urchin tends to be more active at night. During the day it may semi-bury itself in sand, and it sometimes disguises itself with fragments of shell and gravel held in place by its tube feet. It feeds on kelp, particularly Macrocystis, Gigartina and Laminaria, but primarily grazes on young stages rather than fully-grown fronds. In the California kelp forests, the painted urchin is preyed on by the bat star (Patiria miniata).
