= DNAJB4 =

Protein-coding gene found in humans

Identifiers
- Aliases: DNAJB4, DNAJW, DjB4, HLJ1, DnaJ heat shock protein family (Hsp40) member B4
- External IDs: OMIM: 611327; MGI: 1914285; GeneCards: DNAJB4

Gene location (Human)
Chr.	Chromosome 1 (human)
Band	1p31.1	Start	77,979,175 bp
Band	1p31.1	End	78,017,964 bp

Gene location (Mouse)
Chr.	Chromosome 3 (mouse)
Band	3|3 H3	Start	151,884,148 bp
Band	3|3 H3	End	151,915,939 bp
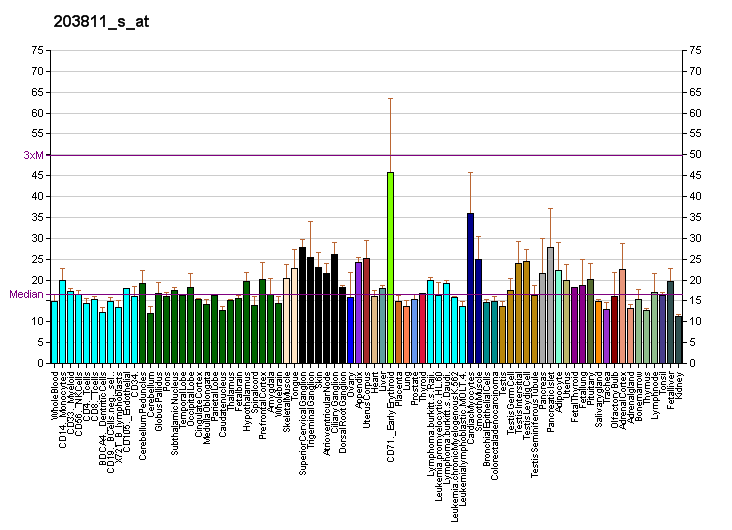

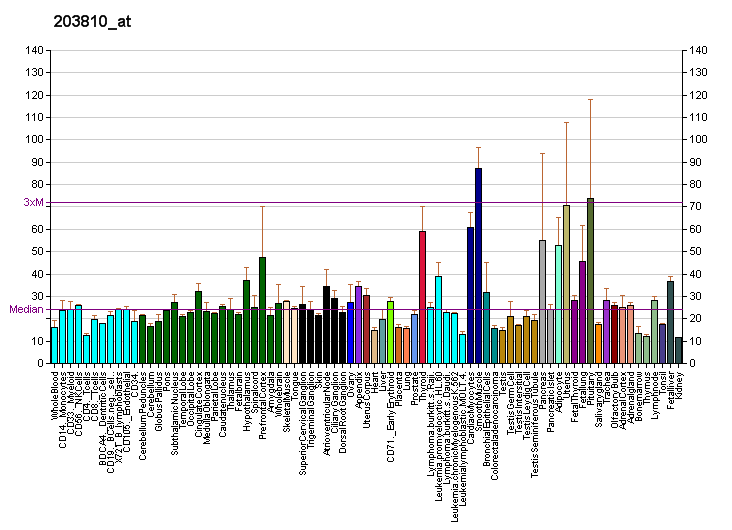
RNA expression pattern
Bgee	Human / Mouse (ortholog); Top expressed in: Skeletal muscle tissue of rectus abdominis; Achilles tendon; Skeletal muscle tissue of biceps brachii; muscle of thigh; right ventricle; thoracic diaphragm; tail of epididymis; myocardium; vena cava; right coronary artery / Top expressed in: ascending aorta; aortic valve; secondary oocyte; zygote; seminiferous tubule; primary oocyte; atrioventricular valve; spermatid; intercostal muscle; tunica media of zone of aorta; More reference expression data
BioGPS	More reference expression data
Gene ontology
Molecular function	unfolded protein binding; chaperone binding; protein binding; ATPase activator activity
Cellular component	cytosol; membrane; cytoplasm; nucleoplasm; plasma membrane
Biological process	response to unfolded protein; response to heat; protein folding; positive regulation of ATP-dependent activity; negative regulation of transcription by RNA polymerase II; chaperone cofactor-dependent protein refolding
Sources:Amigo / QuickGO
Orthologs
Databases	NCBI: entry; OMA: entry
Species	Human	Mouse
Entrez	11080	67035
Ensembl	ENSG00000162616	ENSMUSG00000028035
UniProt	Q9UDY4	Q9D832
RefSeq (mRNA)	NM_007034; NM_001317099; NM_001317100; NM_001317101; NM_001317102 NM_001317103	NM_025926; NM_027287; NM_001356363; NM_001356364
RefSeq (protein)	NP_001304028; NP_001304029; NP_001304030; NP_001304031; NP_001304032 NP_008965	NP_080202; NP_081563; NP_001343292; NP_001343293
Location (UCSC)	Chr 1: 77.98 – 78.02 Mb	Chr 3: 151.88 – 151.92 Mb
PubMed search
- Wikidata
View/Edit Human	View/Edit Mouse

DnaJ homolog subfamily B member 4 is a protein that in humans is encoded by the DNAJB4 gene.
