= The Monarch Initiative =

Content
- Description: Bioinformatics database of genetic disease data
- Data types captured: genotype, phenotype, variant, disease, species
- Organisms: Metazoa

Contact
- Primary citation: Mungall et al. 2017
- Release date: July 12, 2015

Access
- Website: https://monarchinitiative.org

The Monarch Initiative is a large scale bioinformatics web resource focused on leveraging existing biomedical knowledge to connect genotypes with phenotypes in an effort to aid research that combats genetic diseases. Monarch does this by integrating multi-species genotype, phenotype, genetic variant and disease knowledge from various existing biomedical data resources into a centralized and structured database. While this integration process has been traditionally done manually by basic researchers and clinicians on a case-by-case basis, The Monarch Initiative provides an aggregated and structured collection of data and tools that make biomedical knowledge exploration more efficient and effective.

== Mondo ontology ==
Mondo ontology is product of the Monarch Initiative and provides harmonized disease content for diseases and disorders, both rare and common. The rare disease subset has been published with >10.5 rare diseases, and is maintained by the community.
