= Disease Ontology =

The Disease Ontology (DO) is a formal ontology of human disease. The Disease Ontology project is hosted at the Institute for Genome Sciences at the University of Maryland School of Medicine.

The Disease Ontology project was initially developed in 2003 at Northwestern University to address the need for a purpose-built ontology that covers the full spectrum of disease concepts annotated within biomedical repositories within an ontological framework that is extensible to meet community needs.

The Disease Ontology is an OBO (Open Biomedical Ontologies) Foundry ontology.

Disease Ontology Identifiers (DOIDs) consist of the prefix DOID: followed by number, for example, Alzheimer's disease has the stable identifier DOID:10652. DO is cross-referenced in several resources such as UniProt.

== Example term ==
The Disease Ontology entry for motor neuron disease in OBO format is given below, showing the links to other classification schemes, including ICD-9, ICD-10, MeSH, SNOMED and UMLS.

id: DOID:231
name: motor neuron disease
def: "A neurodegenerative disease that is located_in the motor neurones." Motor neuron disease
xref: ICD10CM:G12.2
xref: ICD10CM:G12.20
xref: ICD9CM:335.2
xref: MSH:D016472
xref: SNOMEDCT_US_2016_03_01:155015007
xref: SNOMEDCT_US_2016_03_01:192888001
xref: SNOMEDCT_US_2016_03_01:192889009
xref: SNOMEDCT_US_2016_03_01:192890000
xref: SNOMEDCT_US_2016_03_01:37340000
xref: UMLS_CUI:C0085084
is_a: DOID:1289 ! Neurodegenerative disease

== See also ==
- Disease Ontology project
