= Otak-otak =

Indonesian traditional fish cake

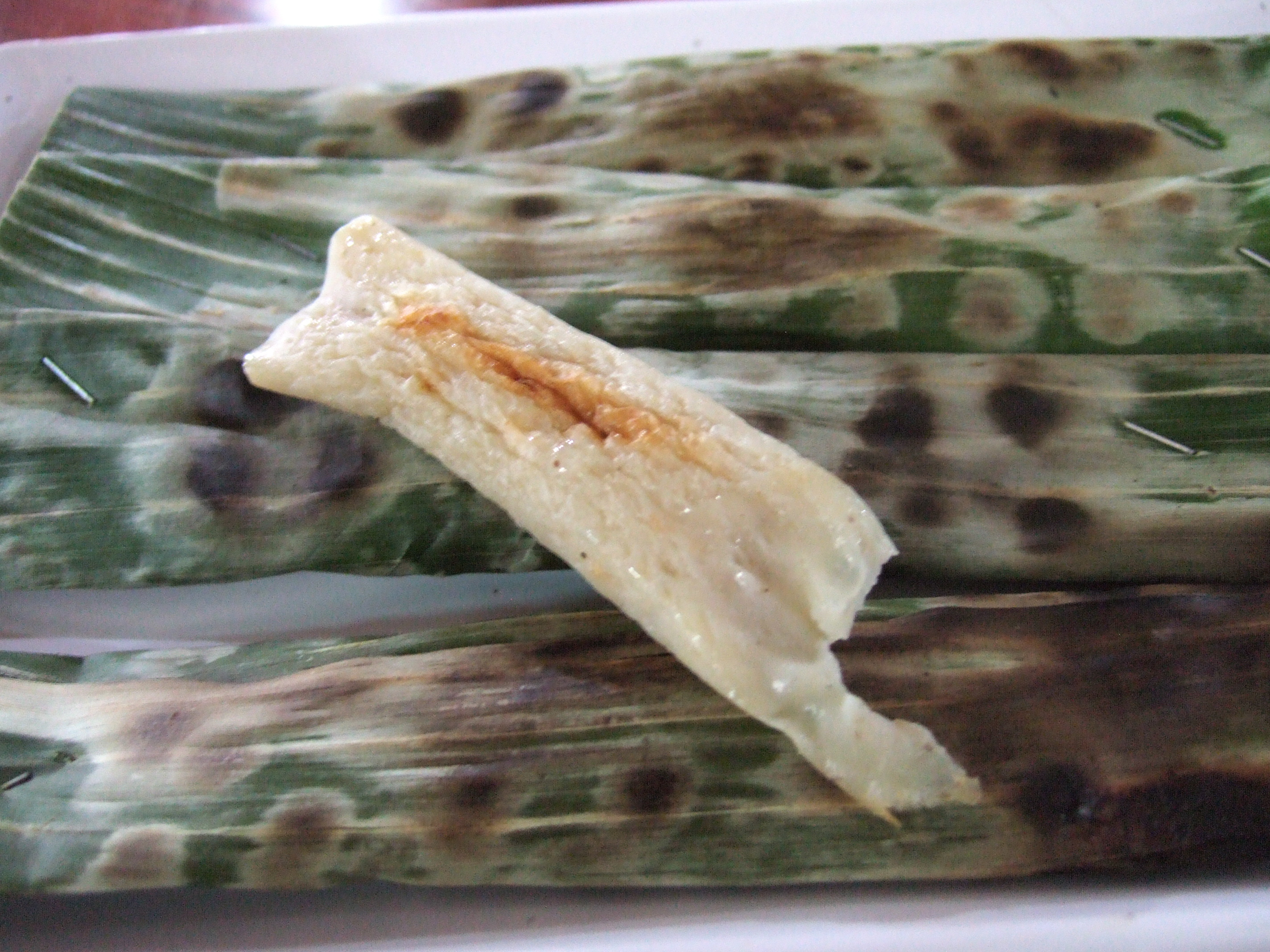
- Otak-otak served in Jakarta
- Alternative names: Otah
- Place of origin: Palembang
- Region or state: Southeast Asia
- Associated cuisine: Indonesia Malaysia, Singapore
- Main ingredients: Fish, spices, leaves

Otak-otak (lit. brains in Malay and Indonesian; Thai: โอตัก-โอตัก) is a Southeast Asian fish cake made of ground fish mixed with spices and wrapped in leaf parcels. Otak-otak is traditionally served steamed or grilled, encased within the leaf parcel it is cooked in, and can be eaten solely as a snack or with steamed rice as part of a meal.

The earliest preparations of otak-otak are believed to have originated in Palembang cuisine of South Sumatra, where it takes the form of grilled banana leaf parcels filled with a mixture of ground fish, tapioca starch and spices. Regional varieties which bear the name otak-otak are widely known across Indonesia and other Southeast Asian countries, though they may have little in common with the Palembang version. In Singapore and southern Malaysia, the reddish-orange or brown colour of its contents is acquired from chili, turmeric and other spices.

== Origins and distribution ==
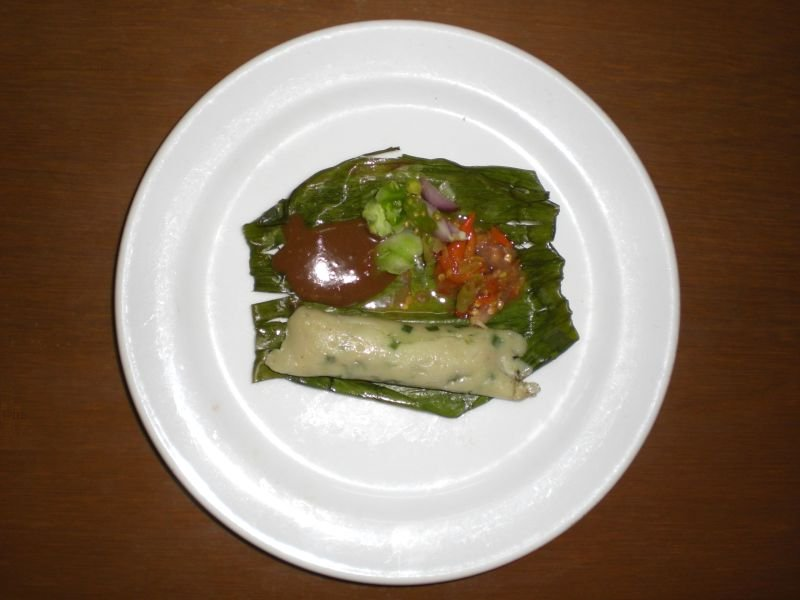
Otak-otak in Makassar, Indonesia

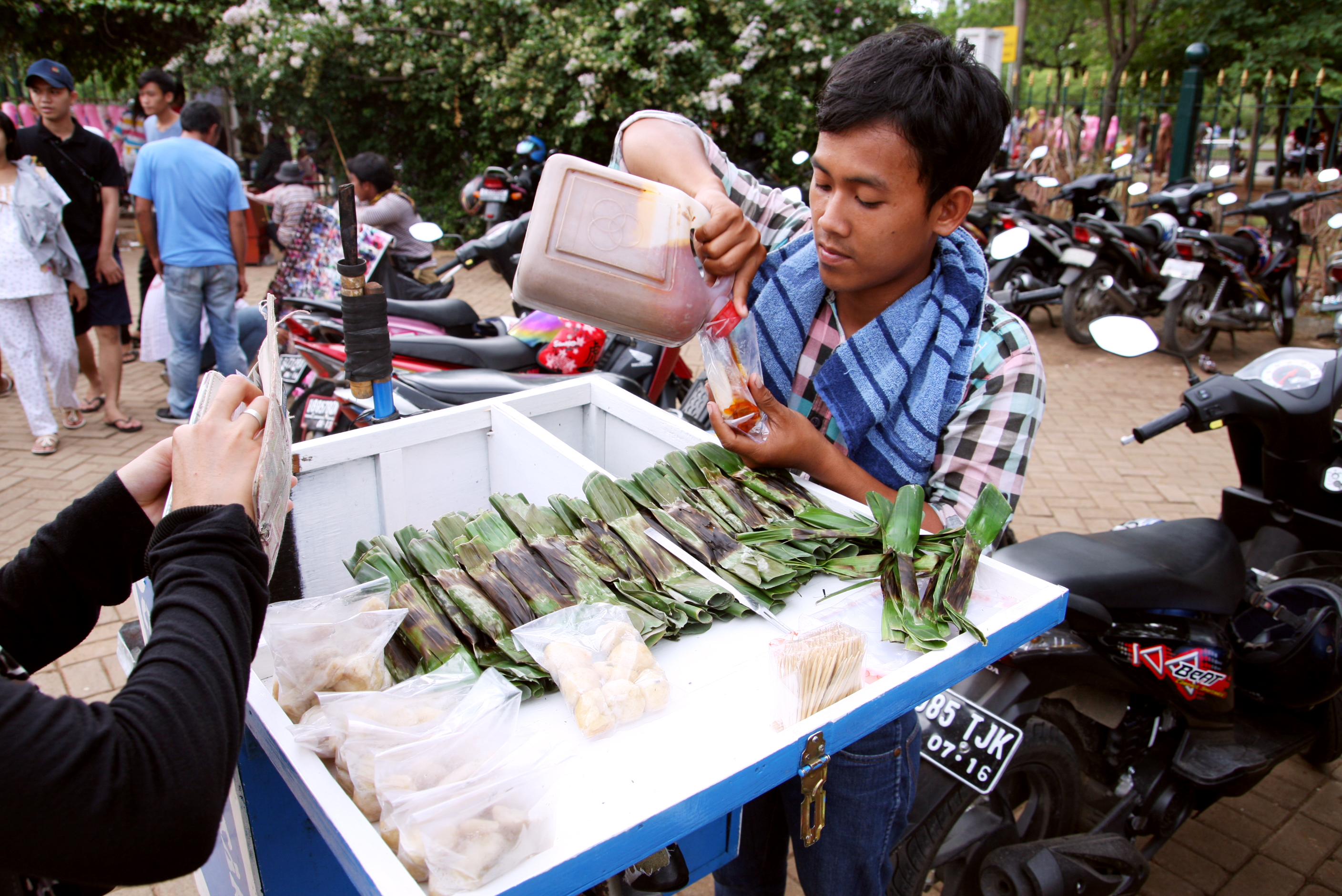
Otak-otak seller pouring spicy peanut sauce.

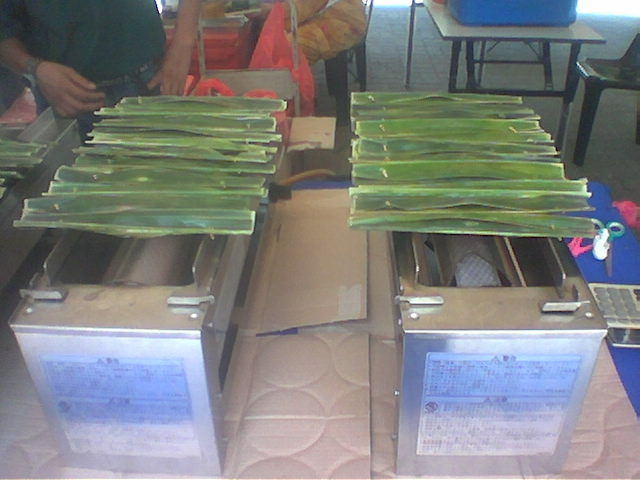
Grilling otak-otak in Malaysia

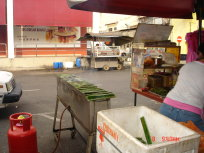
Otak-otak being grilled on a street in Muar, Johor, Malaysia.

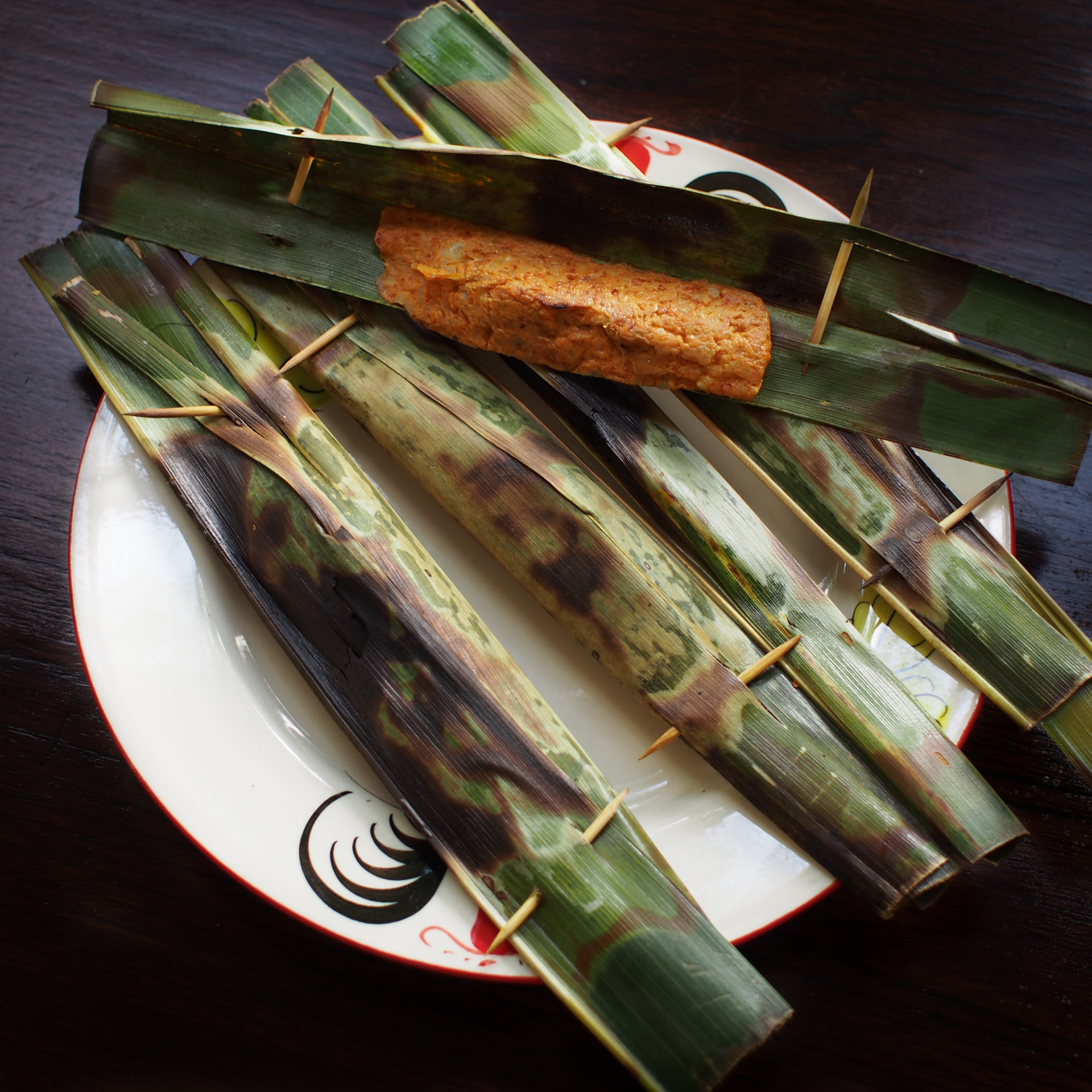
Otah from Katong, Singapore.

Otak-otak is widely spread on both sides of the Straits of Malacca. It is believed that the dish was a fusion of Malay (Palembangese) and Peranakan origins. In Indonesia, the name of the dish is said to be derived from the notion that the Palembang otak-otak resembles brain matter: the mixture of ground fish meat and tapioca starch is whitish grey, soft and almost squishy. From Palembang, it is believed to have spread to the islands of Sumatra, Java, and the rest of the Malay Peninsula. Three Indonesian cities are famous for their otak-otak: Palembang, Jakarta and Makassar. In Bangka island, the town of Belinyu is famous as a production center of otak-otak.

The town of Muar, Johor located south of West Peninsular Malaysia is renowned for its version of otak-otak. It is a culinary attraction for tourists from surrounding states and neighbouring Singapore, where the dish is known as otah or 烏打 in Chinese.

== Composition ==
Otak-otak is made by mixing fish paste with a mixture of spices. The type of fish used to make otak-otak might vary: mackerel is commonly used in Malaysia, while ikan tenggiri (wahoo) is popular ingredient in Indonesia. Other types of fish such as bandeng (milkfish) and the more expensive ikan belida (featherback fish) might be used.

In Indonesia, the mixture typically contains fish paste, shallots, garlic, scallions, egg, coconut milk, and sago or tapioca starch. In Jakarta, Indonesia, one finds otak-otak being sold in small stalls near bus stops, especially during afternoon rush hour. In Makassar, the main ingredient is fresh king mackerel fish, also called king fish or Spanish mackerel.

In Malaysia, it is usually a mixture between fish paste, chili peppers, garlic, shallots, turmeric, lemongrass and coconut milk. The mixture is then wrapped in either banana, coconut or nipa palm leaf that has been softened by steaming, then grilled or steamed.

== Regional varieties ==
There are different varieties of otak-otak originating from different regions. Although otak-otak is traditionally made with fish meat, modern versions of otak-otak may use crab or prawn meat or fish heads.

In Indonesia, otak-otak is commonly associated with Palembang, South Sumatra. However, other regions in Indonesia are also known for their otak-otak recipes, such as Jakarta and Makassar. In Palembang, people eat otak-otak with cuko (Palembangese sweet and sour spicy vinegar sauce), while across the strait on Bangka Belitung islands, the slightly different sour cuko sauce is made with a mixture of vinegar, shrimp paste and fermented soybean paste. In Jakarta and Makassar, it is eaten with spicy peanut sauce.

In Tanjungpinang, Bintan Island, otak-otak is generally made from fish and cuttlefish meat; also typical of this area is the use of fish bones. It is mixed with spices and wrapped using coconut leaves.

The otak-otak from southern Peninsular Malaysia and Singapore is wrapped up as a thin slice using banana or coconut leaf and grilled over a charcoal fire. As a result, it ends up drier and with a more distinct smoky fish aroma. Unlike the pale white colouration of most Indonesian otak-otak, otak-otak from Malaysia and Singapore is reddish-orange from the use of chilli paste and often heavily spiced.

Muar-style otak-otak is wrapped inside attap (nipa palm) leaves and clipped using a stapler or toothpick at both ends before being grilled or roasted on the stove. While fish otak-otak is most common, Muar-style otak-otak may also be made with prawns, cuttlefish, crab meat, fish heads and chicken. Besides being wrapped and grilled in attap leaf parcels, Muar-style otak-otak may be steamed as an alternative cooking method.

Peranakan-style otak-otak (Malay: otak-otak Nyonya) from the northern Malaysian state of Penang is prepared with a mixture of ground fish, eggs, and herbs, wrapped in banana leaves before steaming.

In the Philippines, Tausūg people created utak-utak made of shredded tuna meat mixed with spices and grated coconut, then fried in vegetable oil.

== Similar dishes ==
A dish similar to otak-otak from the Malaysian state of Terengganu is called sata. A similar Indonesian dish employing banana leaf is called pepes. Other types of otak-otak include dishes called pais ikan, botok that are made of fish paste cooked in banana leaves.

The northern Philippine province of Pangasinan has a similar dish called tupig, which is cooked in the same manner as otak-otak, though tupig is sweetened. A thick batter made of glutinous rice flour (known locally as galapong), coconut strips, coconut milk, sugar and nuts is wrapped in banana leaves, and then grilled over coals.

== See also ==
- Malay cuisine
- Peranakan cuisine
- Szczecin paprikas
- Pempek
- Lekor
- Tamale
- Conkie
