= Pepes =

Indonesian traditional banana leaf dish

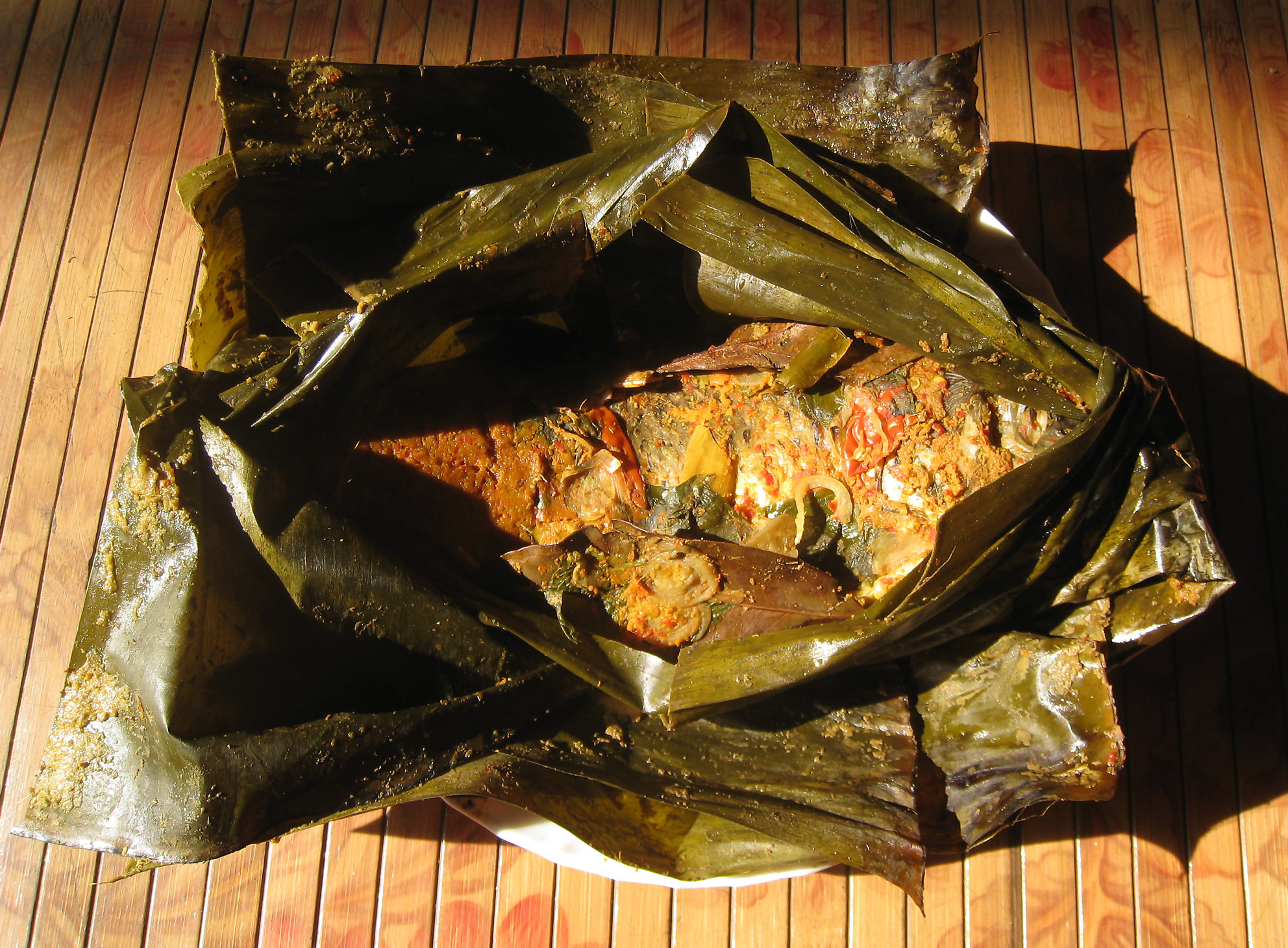
- Carp fish pepes
- Alternative names: Pais (Sundanese)
- Course: Main course
- Place of origin: Indonesia
- Region or state: Nationwide
- Serving temperature: Hot or room temperature
- Main ingredients: Various ingredients (fish, meat, mushroom, tofu or oncom) spiced and cooked in a banana leaf
- Variations: Buntil, botok, otak-otak

Pepes is an Indonesian cooking method using banana leaves as food wrappings. The banana-leaf package containing food is secured with lidi seumat (a small nail made from the central ribs of coconut leaves) and then steamed or grilled on charcoal. This cooking technique allows the rich spice mixture to be compressed against the main ingredients inside the individual banana-leaf package while being cooked and also adds a distinct aroma of cooked or burned banana leaves. Although being cooked simultaneously with food, the banana leaf is a non-edible material and is discarded after consuming the food.

== Etymology ==
The cooking technique employing banana leaf as the wrapper is widely distributed throughout Indonesia and it is known by many names in several regional languages: pais in Sundanese, brengkesan in Javanese, brengkes in Palembang, pelasan in Javanese-Osing, palai in Minangkabau, and payeh in Acehnese. The common Indonesian name pepes was derived from the Sundanese word papais; the plural form of pais in Sundanese language. Because its popularity was first contributed through the Sundanese cuisine, today pepes is often associated with Sundanese cuisine.

== Variations ==
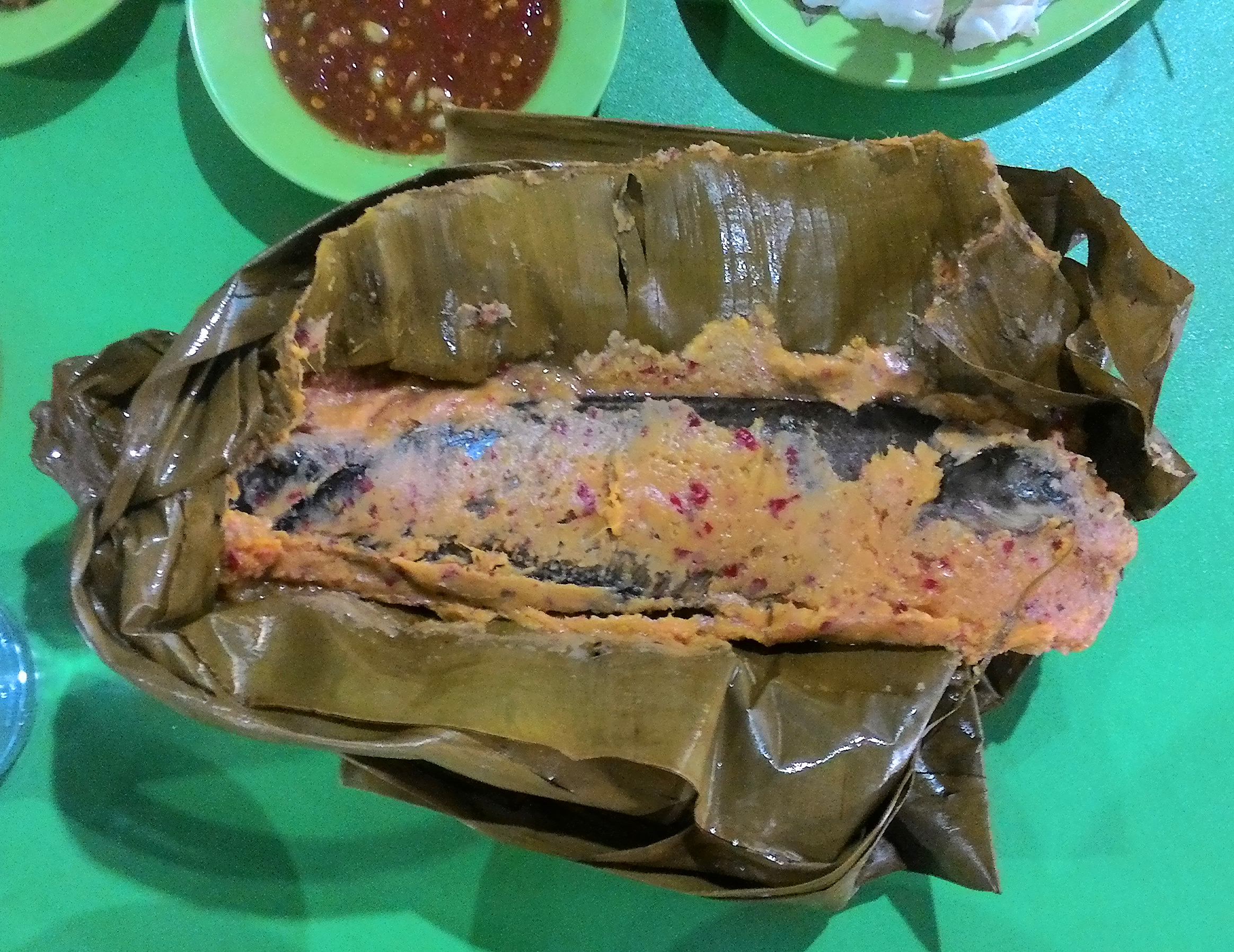
Brengkes tempoyak iwak lais served in a traditional restaurant in Palembang. Brengkes is the Palembang Malay term for pepes.

This technique is most commonly used to prepare fish. In West Java, ikan mas (Cyprinus carpio) is the fish most commonly cooked as pepes. In Palembang, patin (Pangasius sutchi) and lais (Kryptopterus cryptopterus) are the most common fish used, while in West Sumatra, people use bilih fish (Mystacoleucus padangensis).

However, fish is not the only ingredient to be made using the pepes method. Seafood, meat, chicken, tofu, tempeh, oncom, mushroom, or vegetables are also available to be prepared in this method. There are many variations of pepes recipes. Other kinds of seafood, such as shrimp and squid, although less common, can be used in pepes. Non-fish meat, such as chicken and minced beef mixed with egg can also be used. In Palembang, the dish pepes tempoyak is well known, which is a steamed fermented durian paste in a banana leaf container. Rather exotic and unusual meat might also be cooked as pepes; for example, swikee variations, frog legs, and frog eggs might be prepared as pepes. The method is used in several Indonesian dishes, and also become the name of a dish prepared in this manner, for example:

1. Pepes ikan mas (carp pepes)
2. Pepes daging (minced beef pepes)
3. Pepes ayam (chicken pepes)
4. Pepes tahu (tofu pepes)
5. Pepes oncom (oncom pepes)
6. Pepes teri (anchovy pepes)
7. Pepes jamur (mushroom pepes)
8. Pepes kodok (boneless frog legs pepes)
9. Pepes telur kodok (frog eggs pepes)
10. Pepes tempoyak (fermented durian paste pepes)

Pepes products are typically consumed with steamed rice. Otak-otak is similar to pepes, it is a mixture of fish and tapioca flour with spices wrapped in banana leaf. The vegetables with shredded coconut pepes are called Botok. Buntil is prepared similarly, but uses papaya or cassava leaves instead of banana leaves, making the wrapping edible as part of the dish. A similar Malaysian dish employing banana leaves is called sata.

== Preparation ==
Pepes is made by mixing descaled and gutted fish or any type of food with a mixture of spices including salt, chilli, shallots, garlic, turmeric, ginger, lemongrass, curry leaf, candlenut, tamarind, tomato, and lemon basil all wrapped in a banana leaf. Sundanese cuisine recognizes two types of pepes: the regular or “plain” variety and yellow pepes, which are cooked with turmeric. The leaf is wrapped tight and secured with a stick at each ends, then steamed or grilled. To make soft-boned fish pepes, the method using pressure cooker or prolonged cooking time is employed.

== Gallery ==
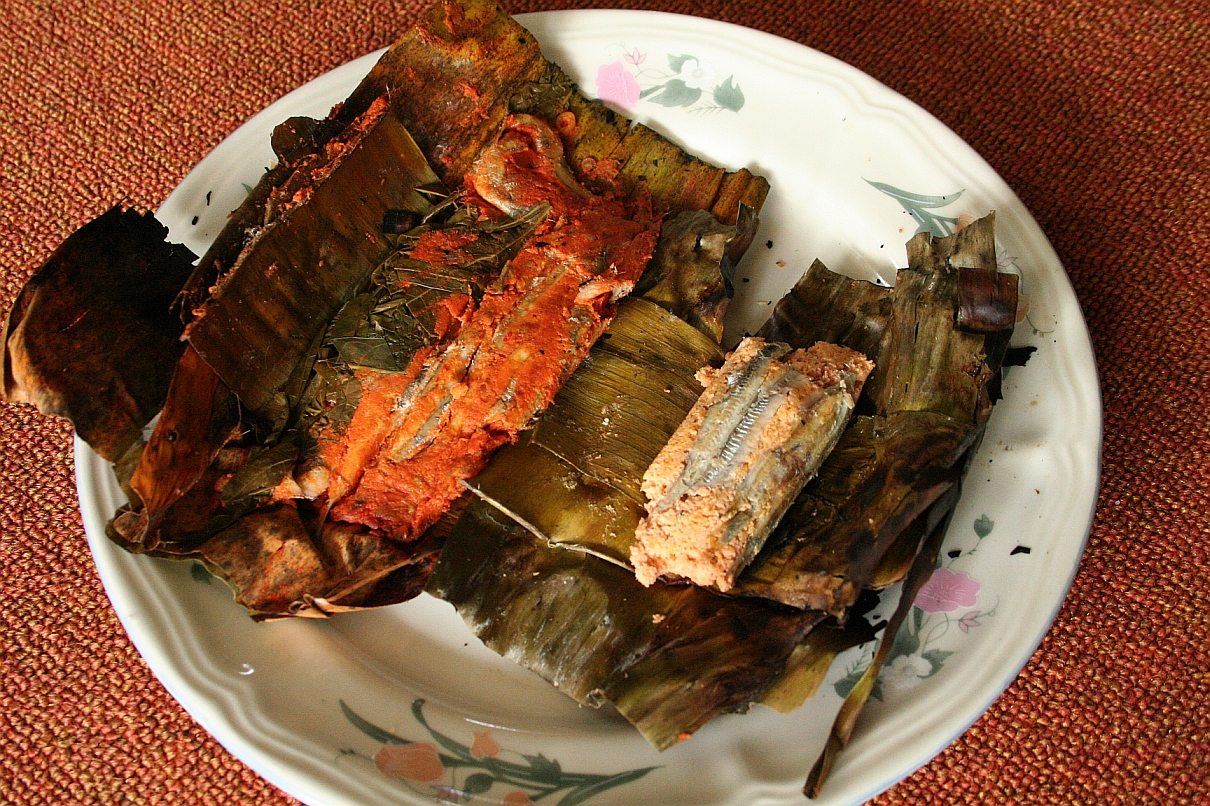
Palai bada, a Minang version of fish pepes

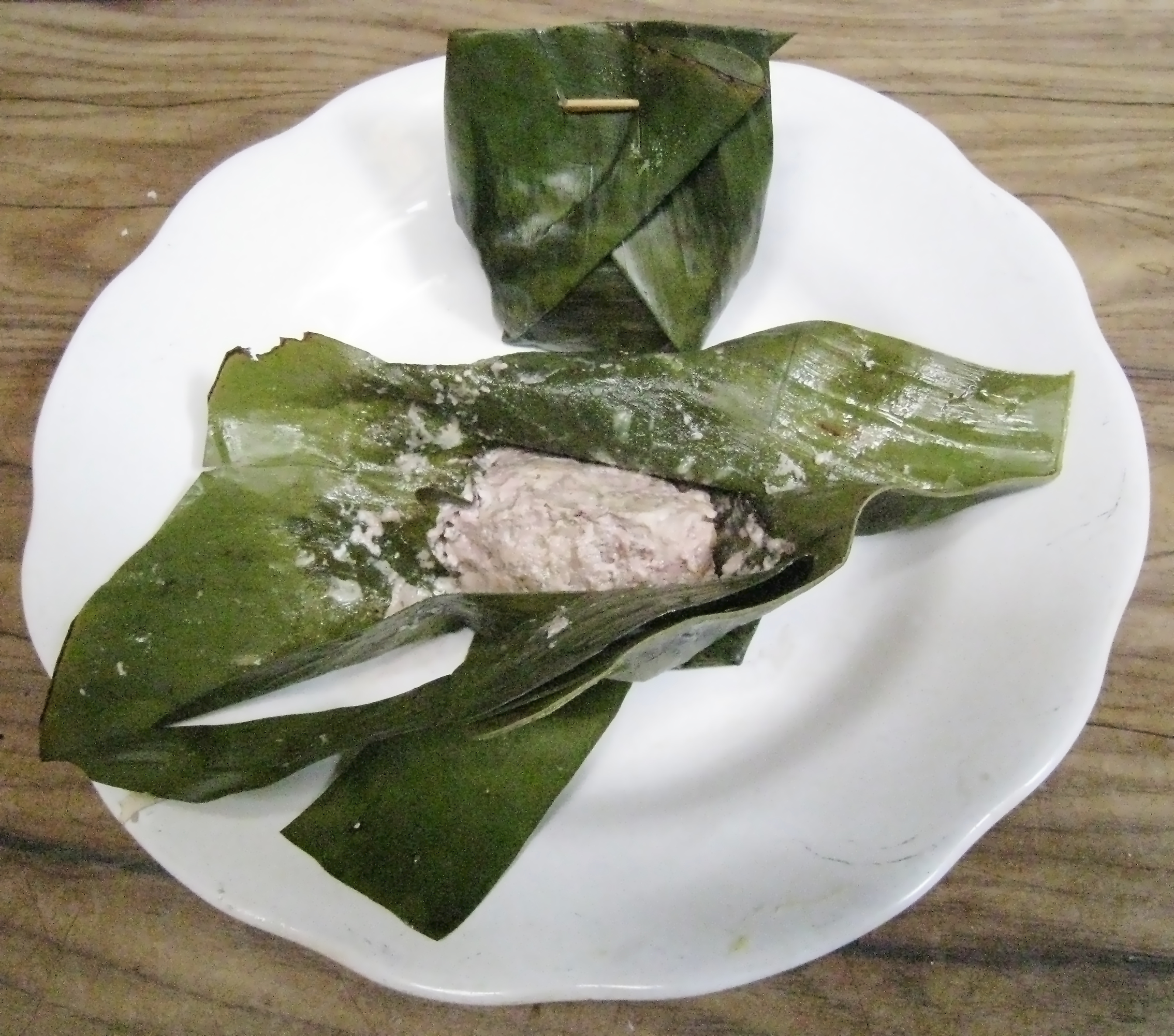
Minced beef pepes

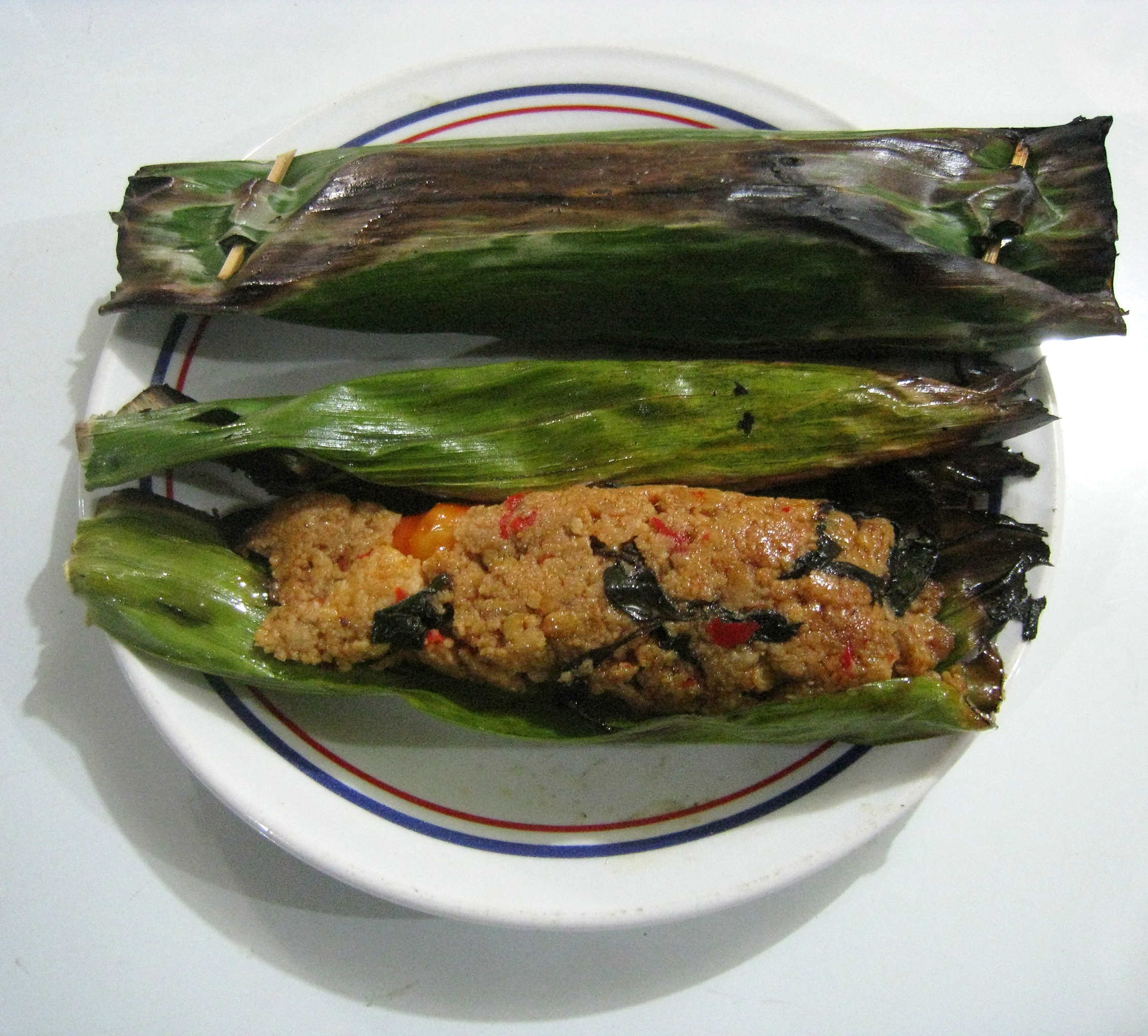
Pepes oncom

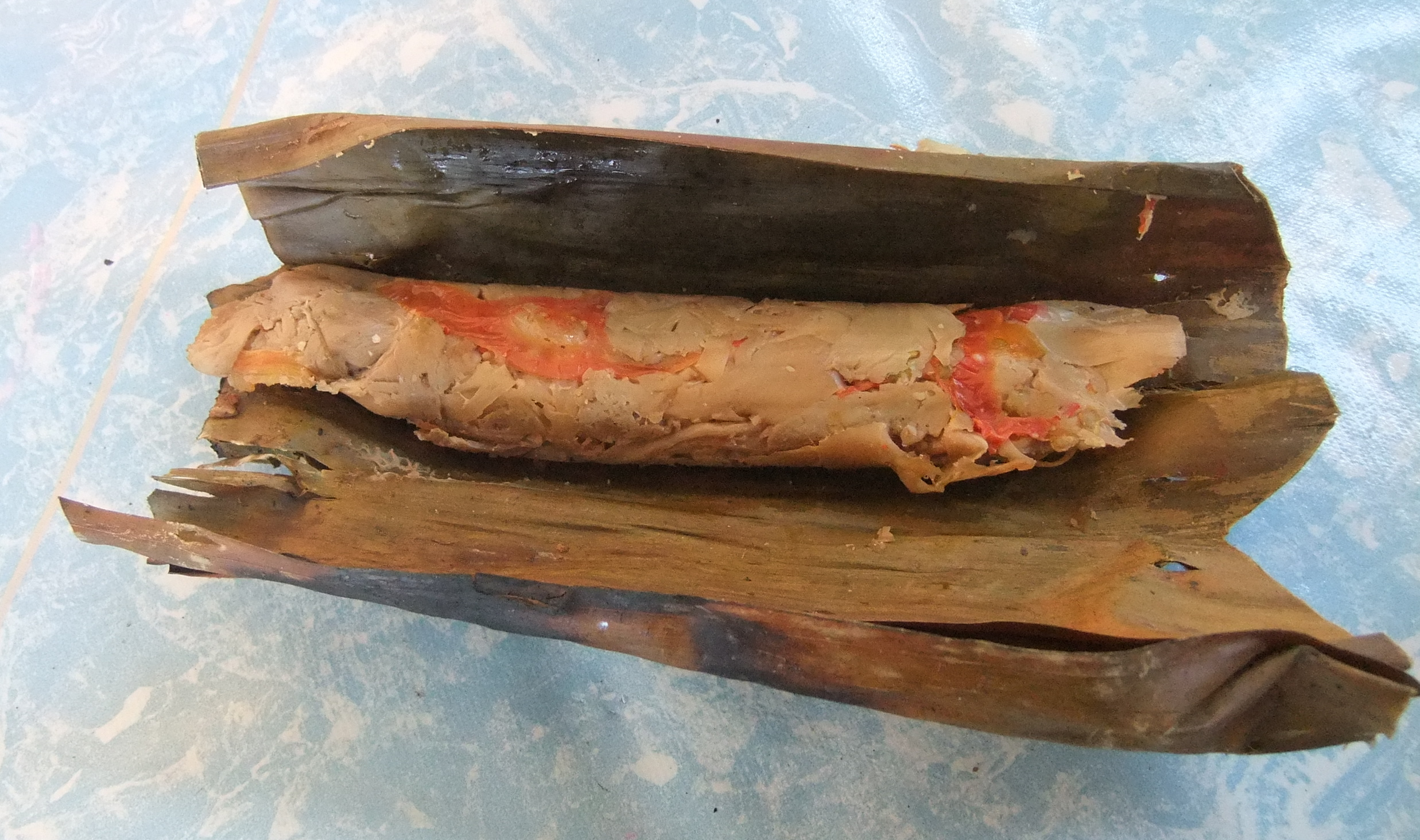
Mushroom pepes

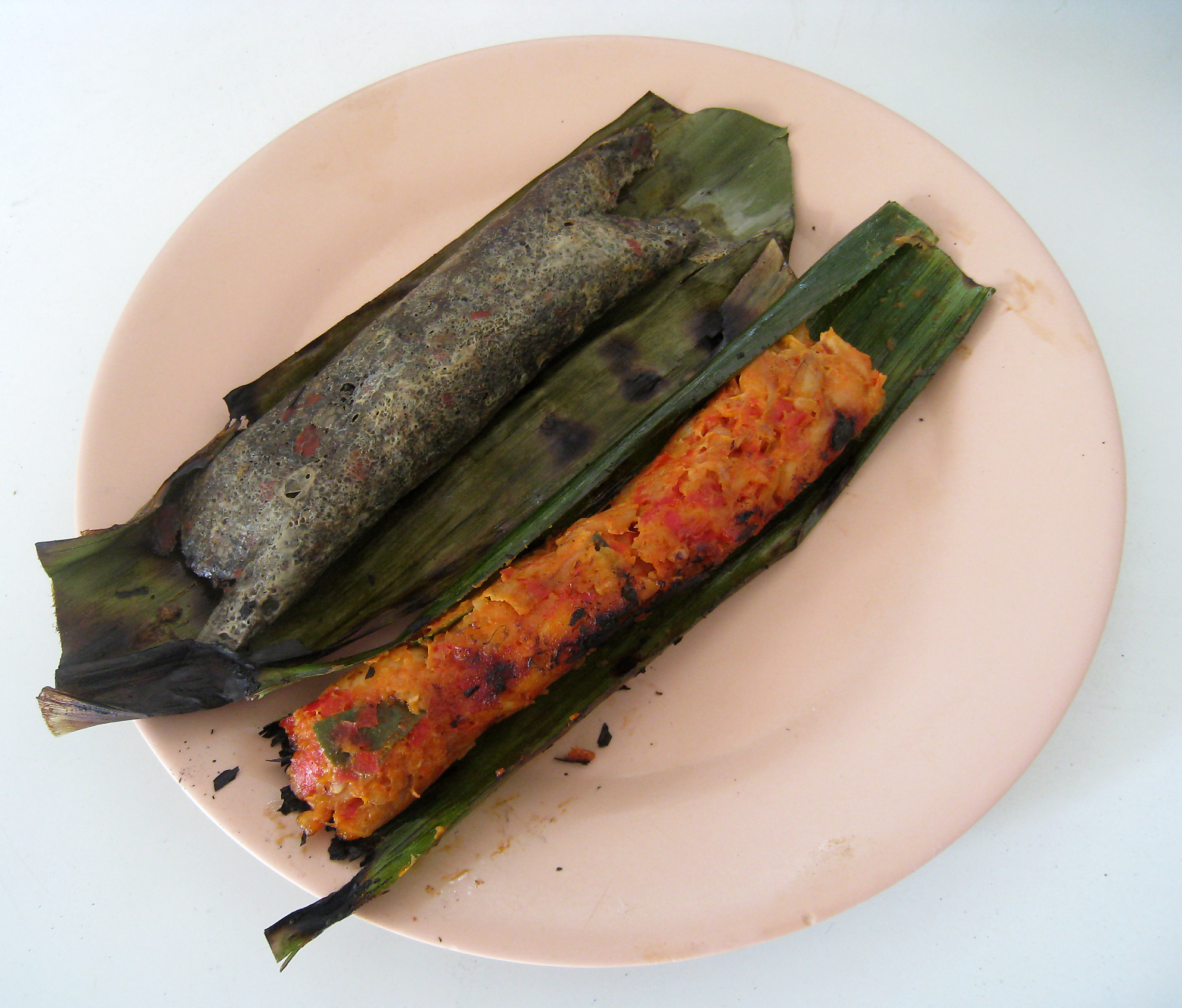
Frog eggs and frog legs pepes

== See also ==
- Arem-arem
- Bobotie
- Conkies
- Fish amok
- Humitas
- Ketupat
- Lemper
- Lepet
- Lontong
- List of stuffed dishes
- Nagasari
- Sata
- Suman
- Tamale
- Zongzi
