= Botok =

Indonesian traditional coconut dish

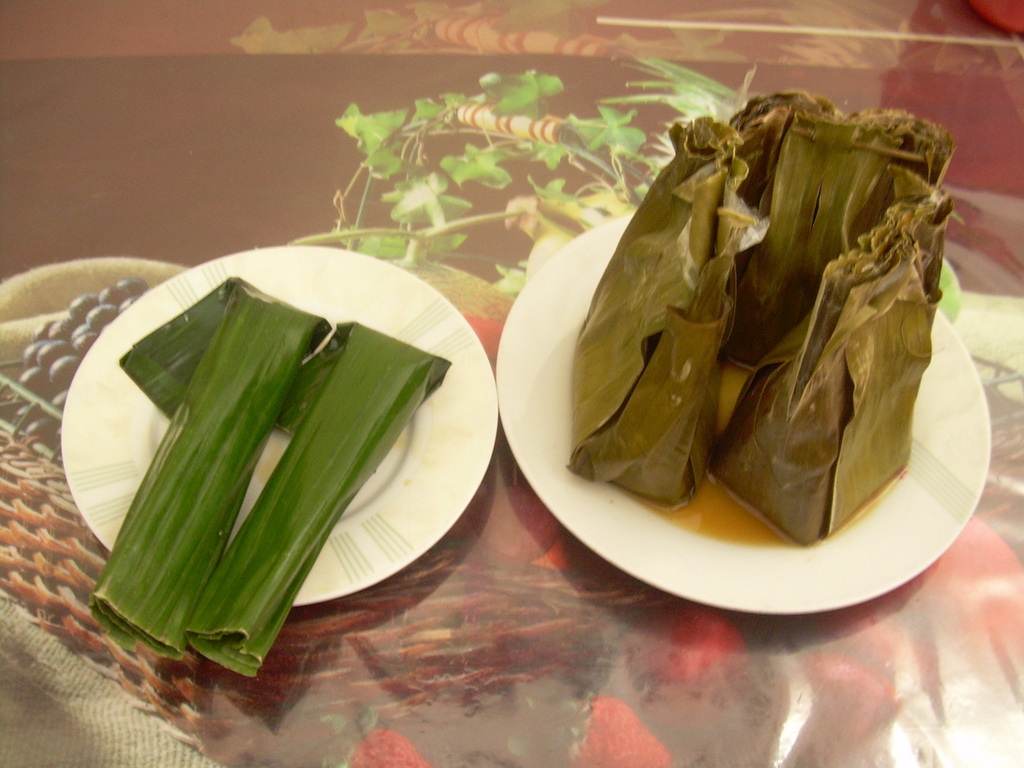
- Unopened botok in banana leaves wrapping
- Alternative names: Bobotok, Botok-botok
- Course: Main course
- Place of origin: Indonesia
- Region or state: Central Java, Yogyakarta, East Java
- Serving temperature: Hot or room temperature
- Main ingredients: Grated coconut with various ingredients (tempeh, tofu, anchovy, fish, meat or mushroom) spiced and steamed in banana leaf
- Variations: Buntil, Pepes, Otak-otak

Botok or ꦧꦺꦴꦛꦺꦴꦏ꧀ (Bothok) (sometimes called Bobotok in its plural form or Botok-botok) is a traditional Javanese dish made from grated coconut flesh which has been squeezed of its coconut milk, often mixed with other ingredients such as vegetables or fish, and wrapped in banana leaf and steamed. It is commonly found in the Javanese people area of Java Island (Yogyakarta Special Region, Central, and East Java. It has a soft texture like mozzarella cheese and is usually white.

Botok seems to be a byproduct of coconut milk production, to save and reuse the grated coconut flesh that might be otherwise discarded. Commonly, the grated coconut flesh flakes are discarded after squeezing them to acquire the coconut milk. However, by cooking them in banana leaves with an additional mixture and spices, they can also be eaten as an additional dish. Another way to save the grated coconut residue is to saute them as serundeng. Today, however, for better flavor, many recipes insist on using only freshly grated coconut flesh that still contains coconut milk. Botok is typically consumed with rice.

== Preparation and serving ==
The grated coconut flesh is mixed with chili, salt, pepper, lemon basil, and salam (Indonesian bay leaf) and additional ingredients. This mixture is placed upon a piece of banana leaf, and then the leaf is wrapped tight and secured with a stick, then placed on a steamer. The most basic botok usually uses simple and cheaper ingredients, such as minced tempeh, tofu, or anchovy. After the botok is cooked, the banana leaf package is opened and served with steamed rice. After perfectly cooked, the grated coconut and sometimes the egg addition, act as the binding agent of the whole botok ingredients.

== Variations ==
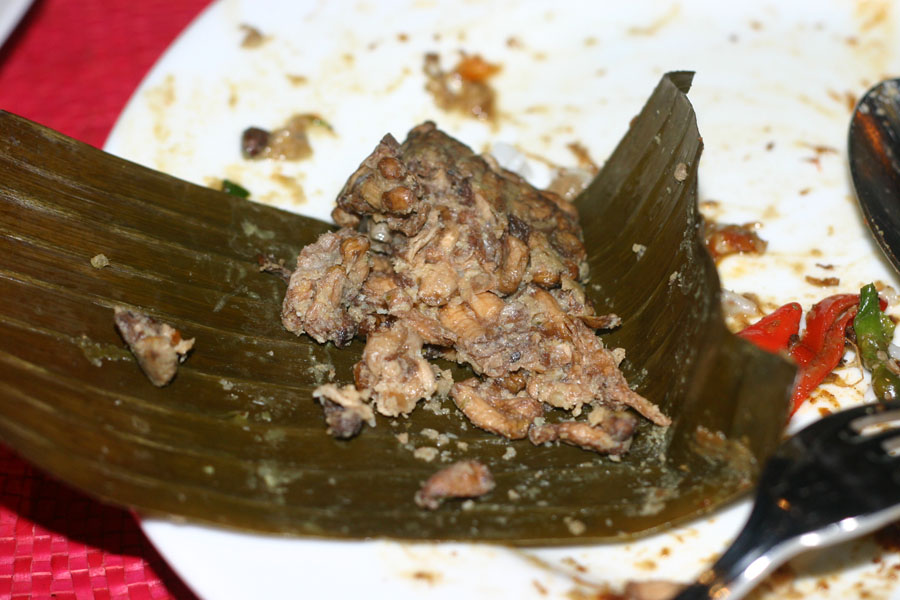
Botok tawon—botok made from bee larvae

To add flavor and nutrients, many botok recipes and variants might use additional ingredients as a protein source, such as petai cina, belimbing wuluh, ares (the core of a banana trunk), mushroom, tofu, tempeh, anchovy, wahoo, catfish, salted fish, egg, salted egg, shrimp, minced beef or even bee larvae. The botok method is used in several variant ingredients, and also becomes the name of a dish prepared in this manner, for example:

1. Botok ares (the core of a banana trunk botok)
2. Botok belimbing wuluh (Averrhoa bilimbi botok)
3. Botok beluntas (Pluchea indica leaf botok)
4. Botok cepokak (pea eggplant botok)
5. Botok daging (minced beef botok)
6. Botok jamur (mushroom botok)
7. Botok keong (freshwater snail botok)
8. Botok kutuk (snakehead botok)
9. Botok lele (catfish botok)
10. Botok mlanding (petai cina or lamtoro botok)
11. Botok ontong (jantung pisang/banana flower bud botok)
12. Botok peda (Rastrelliger botok)
13. Botok sembukan (Paederia foetida leaf botok)
14. Botok tahu (tofu botok)
15. Botok tawon (bee larvae for honeybee botok)
16. Botok telur (egg botok)
17. Botok telur asin (salted egg botok)
18. Botok tempe (tempeh botok)
19. Botok tempe tahu teri (tofu, tempeh, anchovy combo botok)
20. Botok tengiri (wahoo botok)
21. Botok teri (anchovy botok)
22. Botok udang (shrimp botok)
23. Botok ungker (Hyblaea puera pupa botok)
24. Botok wader (Silver rasbora botok)
25. Botok yuyu (freshwater crab botok)

== Similar dishes ==
Buntil is prepared similarly, but uses papaya or cassava leaves instead of banana leaves, making the wrapping edible as part of the dish. Botok is often considered as the variations of pepes, the cooking method using banana leaf. However, botok is identified more specifically by using shredded coconut flesh, while pepes usually contain no coconut at all.

The South African dish of bobotie is thought to be the derivative of Indonesian bobotok. It is, however, quite different as it uses minced beef and eggs, with the absence of grated coconut and banana leaf packages. The role of grated coconut and eggs as binding agents in bobotok seems to be replaced by beaten eggs, milk, and shredded bread in bobotie.

== See also ==
- Javanese cuisine
