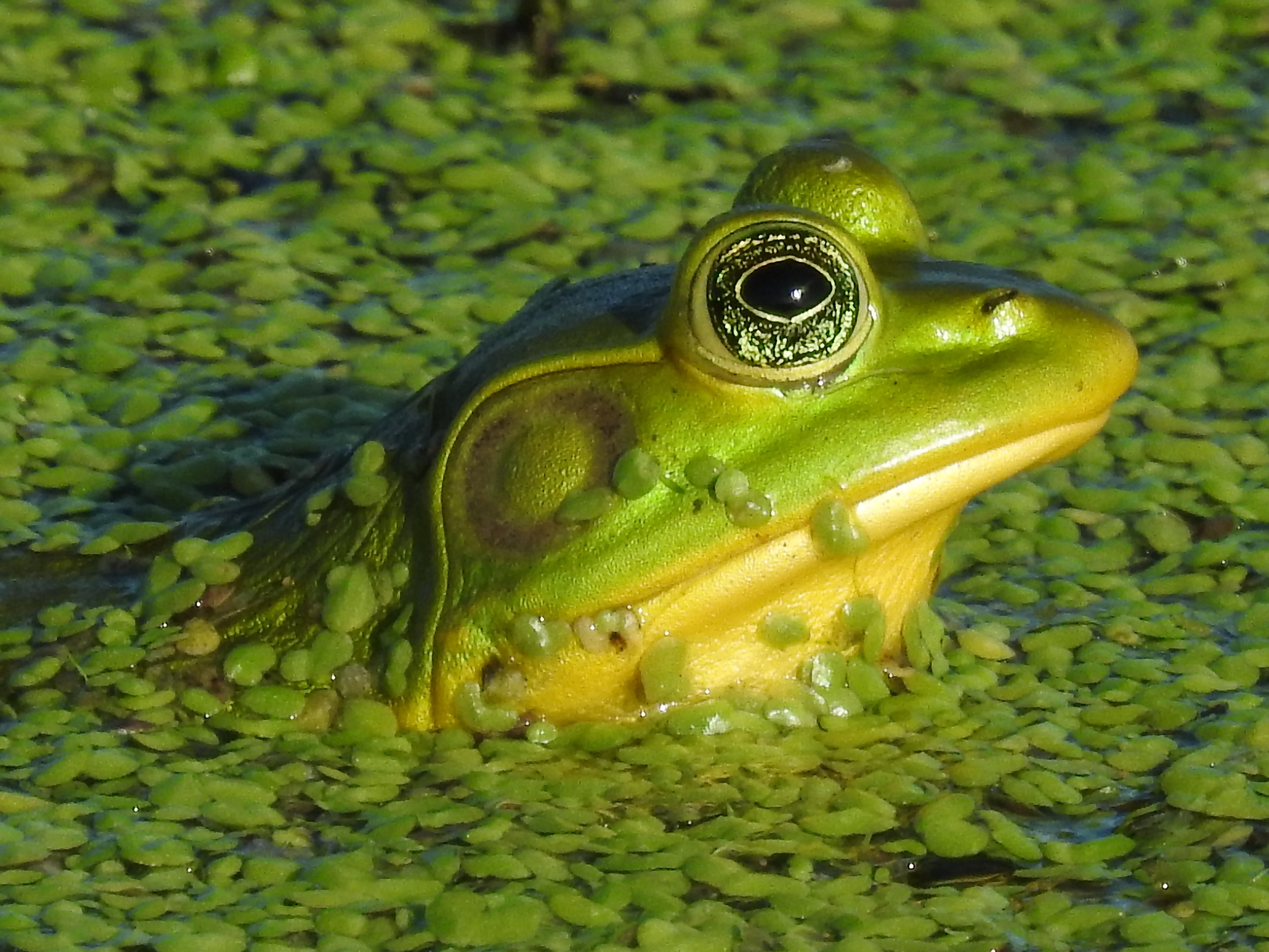

Conservation status
- Least Concern (IUCN 3.1)

- Secure (NatureServe)

Scientific classification
- Kingdom: Animalia
- Phylum: Chordata
- Class: Amphibia
- Order: Anura
- Family: Ranidae
- Genus: Lithobates
- Species: L. grylio

Binomial name
- Lithobates grylio (Stejneger, 1901)

Synonyms
- Rana grylio Stejneger, 1901

= Pig frog =

Species of amphibian

The pig frog (Lithobates grylio) is a species of aquatic frog found in the Southeastern United States, from South Carolina to Texas. Some sources also refer to it as the lagoon frog or the southern bullfrog.

== Taxonomy ==
Pig frogs (Lithobates grylio) are a species of frog that belong to the class Amphibia, the order Anura, the family Ranidae, and the genus Lithobates. They are part of the phylum Chordata, which includes animals with a notochord and a hollow nerve cord. Pig frogs are vertebrates, meaning they have a backbone, and they are tetrapods, meaning they have four limbs. They are adapted to living both on land and in water, and they are commonly found in the southeastern United States. Norwegian-American naturalist Leonhard Stejneger described the pig frog in 1901, and it still bears its original name. The name comes from the calls the frog makes, sounding like a pig grunting.

== Description ==
The pig frog is green or grey-green in color, with brown or black blotching. It has fully webbed feet, a sharply pointed nose, and large tympana (eardrums). The Pig frog is sexually dimorphic in size and coloration, the males also have a larger tympanum than the females. It is easily mistaken for various other species of the genus Lithobates, with which it shares its geographic range, including the American bullfrog (Lithobates catesbeiana). Pig frogs grow to a snout to vent length (SVL) of 85 to 140 millimetres (3 1/4 to 5 1/2 inches). They are known for their loud, deep grunting or snorting sound, reminiscent to the oinking sound of a pig.

== Ecology and behavior ==
Almost entirely aquatic, they are found predominantly on the edges of lakes, or in cypress swamps and marshes that are heavy with vegetation. They are nocturnal. Their pig-like grunts can be heard during the warm months of the year.

=== Predation ===
Pig frogs are prey for water snakes, cottonmouths, herons, ibises, ospreys, American alligators, and humans.

== Diet ==
Pig frogs are opportunistic feeders and will eat a wide variety of prey, including insects, worms, and small vertebrates. Their primary diet is crawfish, but like most bullfrogs, they will consume almost anything they can swallow, including insects, fish, and other frogs. They are known to feed on beetles, dragonflies, crayfish, and other aquatic invertebrates, and may also occasionally eat fishes and amphibians. They are nocturnal animals and are usually found near water, where they use their strong legs to leap and catch prey. Pig frogs are important members of their ecosystem, helping to control the populations of the insects and other small animals that they eat. They play a vital role in maintaining the balance of their wetland habitats. The percentage of Pig frogs' prey items varies throughout the year, most likely due to the availability of resources.

== Reproduction ==
They breed from April to August, laying their eggs in large surface films, usually over vegetation. The eggs hatch in several days, and the tadpoles may take a year to transform into adult frogs. Pig frogs are sexually dimorphic, with males and females having similar growth rates until the snout-vent length reaches about 100mm, at which point females grow faster and eventually reach a larger size than males. Due to their larger size as adults, females tend to have higher survivability rates than males. Therefore, they are likely to be more abundant in the wild. Males have a bright yellow throat, which is a distinctive characteristic that helps to distinguish them from females. During the breeding season, males produce a low grunting sound to attract females and establish their territory. This species gets its common name from the call males use, which sounds somewhat like a pig's grunt. Fertilization is external, with males releasing sperm over the eggs as they are laid. Eggs are laid in large masses of up to 10,000 at a time on the surface of the water.

== Conservation status ==
The pig frog holds no particular conservation status and is relatively common in its range. The species has been introduced and established itself in China, Andros Island and New Providence Island in the Bahamas, as well as Puerto Rico.

Pig frogs have been reported to be raised for food by Chinese farmers, along with bullfrogs.

== Gallery ==
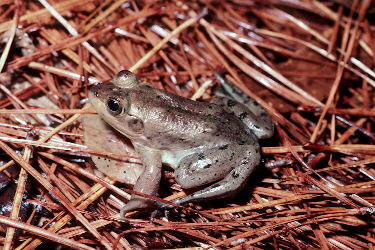
