= Sata (food) =

Malaysian dish

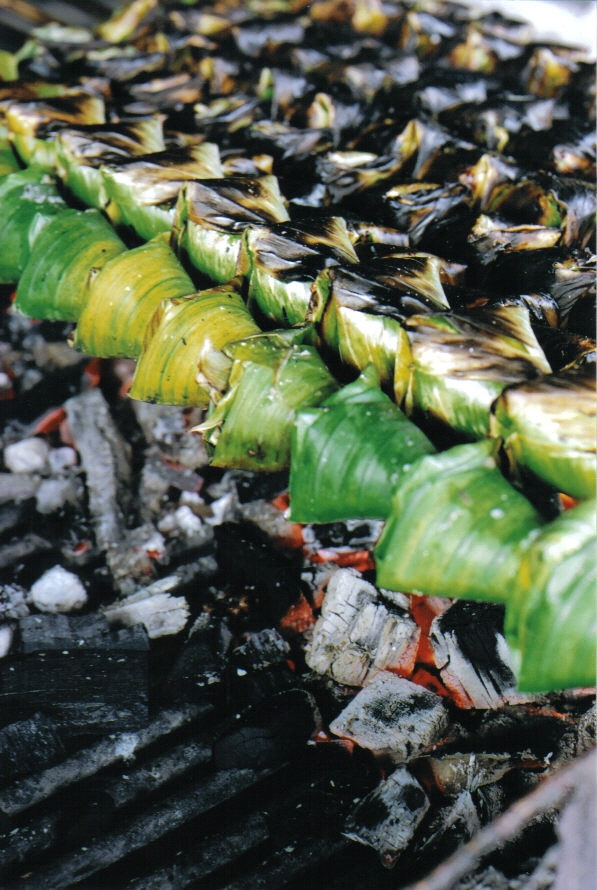
- Sata being cooked on a grill
- Type: Dumpling
- Course: Snack
- Place of origin: Malaysia
- Region or state: Kemaman, Terengganu
- Created by: Terengganu Malays
- Main ingredients: Coconut, sardines

Sata or satar is a traditional dish from the Malaysian state of Terengganu, consisting of spiced fish meat wrapped in banana leaves and grilled over a charcoal fire. It is a type of Malaysian fish cake. The main ingredients of sata are grated coconut, sardines, ginger, onions and chili peppers.

Sata is not to be confused with satay, another dish popular in Malaysia. A sata takes on the shape of a small pyramid, and is sold in batches, joined together in a skewer. It is then sold as an affordable street food. Beside locals, the food has been a favorite among visitors to Terengganu, with the districts of Marang and Kemaman being a popular source for the snack. It is also enjoyed by other states on the East Coast, namely Pahang and Kelantan. With its rising popularity, sata is also available in the Klang Valley, albeit sometimes at higher prices. Sata recipes differ as each family has their own, passed down from one generation to the next. Sata vendors also vary, from fixed stalls to temporary stands at bazaars held during Ramadan. The sticks used to pierce sata can be made from bamboo, metal, or nibong palm.

The snack is believed to originate from fishermen hoping to store excess catch without them going to waste; sardines used to be the main ingredient because they tend to end up as bycatch, and now different types of fish, such as the yellowstripe scad, crimson jobfish, and Spanish mackerel, are also used. Grilling over charcoal fire reduces the microbial count of the fish to safe levels, while adding ginger and chili, both known to have antibacterial effect, further reduces the amount of bacteria. Wrapping it in banana leaves also protects it from external source of contamination. Besides having antibacterial benefits, these steps also adds fragrance and flavor to the food.

== See also ==
- Keropok lekor, another fish-based snack from Terengganu
- Pepes, the Indonesian version of cooking in banana leaf
- Otak-otak, a somewhat similar dish popular in Indonesia, Malaysia and Singapore, which has an elongated shape.
- List of Malay dishes
