= Swikee =

Indonesian frog leg dish

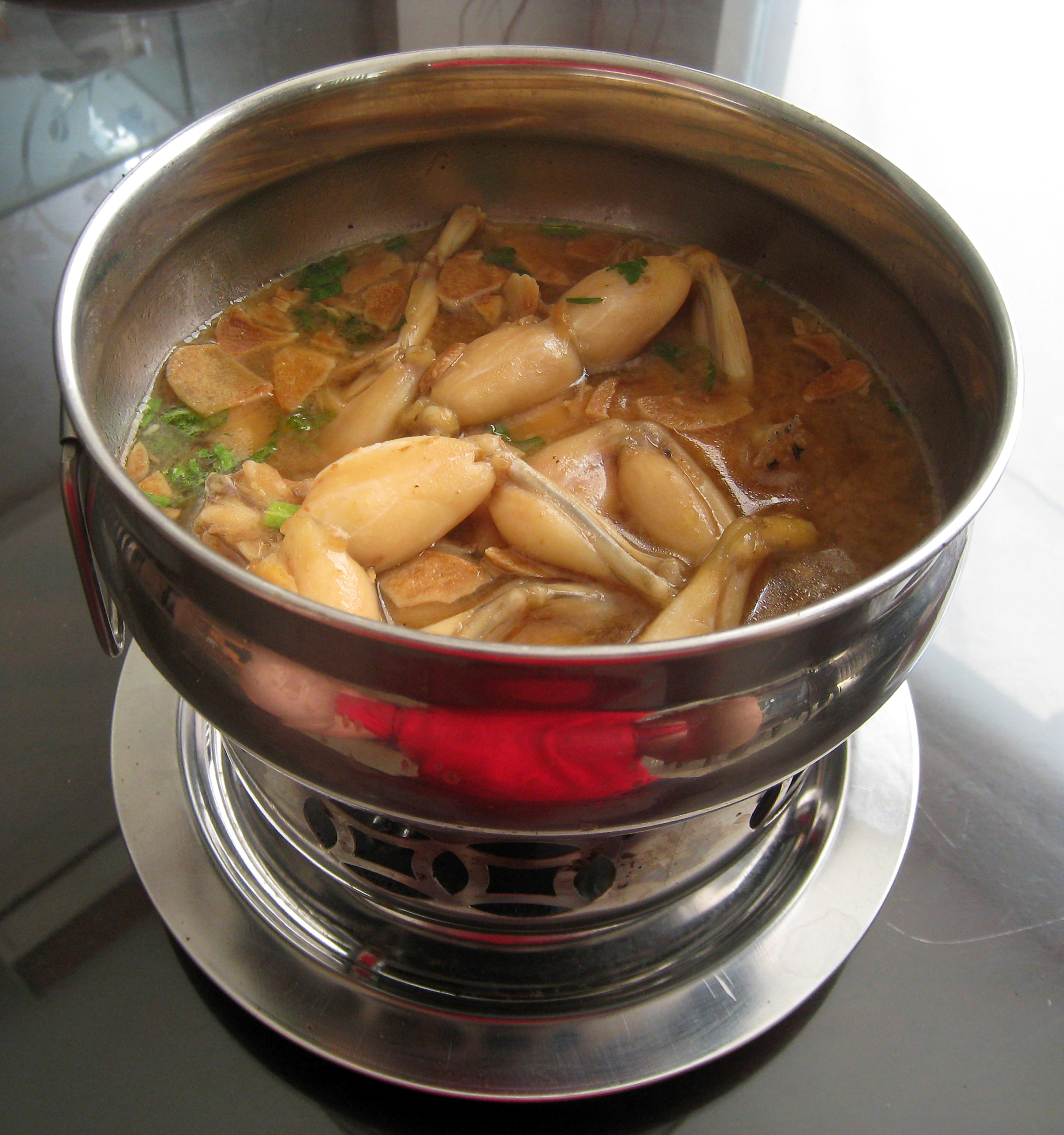
- Swikee Kodok Oh, frog legs in tauco soup
- Course: Main course
- Place of origin: Indonesia
- Region or state: Purwodadi in Central Java, and Jatiwangi in West Java
- Serving temperature: Hot
- Main ingredients: Frog legs cooked in various sauces

Swikee or Swike is a Chinese Indonesian frog leg dish. The dish can be served as soup, deep fried or stir fried frog legs. Originally a Chinese dish, this dish is popular in Indonesia.

The name "Swikee" is from Hokkian dialect (水雞, Pe̍h-ōe-jī: súi-ke) sui (water) and ke (chicken), which is probably a euphemism to refer frogs as "water chicken". It is sometimes identified as a traditional food of Purwodadi, a city in Central Java, and Jatiwangi town in Majalengka, West Java. The main ingredient is frogs' legs (mainly from "green frogs") with the condiments of garlic, ginger and fermented soy paste (tauco), salt, and pepper. Once it is served, fried garlic and chopped celery may be added. Swikee is usually served with plain white steamed rice.

== Description ==
The taste and texture of frog meat is approximately between chicken and fish. They are often said to taste like chicken because of their mild flavor, with a texture most similar to chicken wings. However, some may perceive a slight fishiness. Normally, the legs are the only part served in the soup, since the legs are the most meaty parts; the skin of the frogs may, however, also be dried under the sun, and fried as chips. The salted fried frogs skin has a unique taste incomparable with other types of chips.

Another type of frog cooking is "pepes kodok", frog cooked in pepes method, where the frog legs and different condiments are wrapped in banana leaves and put in a fire until cooked. The taste of the meat is enrichened with a distinct aroma of burned banana leaves.

Frog-cooking is ubiquitous in Purwodadi, Grobogan Regency, Central Java, where it is the local delicacy. Frog leg cooking also can be found in the town of Jatiwangi, Majalengka Regency, West Java. It can also be found in the large cities of Indonesia, such as Jakarta, Cirebon and Bandung (where the most popular swikee restaurant chain is "Swikee Jatiwangi"), Yogyakarta, Semarang or Surabaya. Normally, a restaurant will use the name "Swikee Purwodadi" or "Swikee Jatiwangi" on its restaurant sign and menu.

Currently Indonesia is the world's largest exporter of frog meat, exporting more than 5000 tonnes of frog meat each year, mostly to France, Belgium and Luxembourg. In the past, the frogs could be obtained from the wild, especially during rainy seasons. Lately, there are more and more farms that raise frogs due to increasing demand, especially from France.

== Variations ==
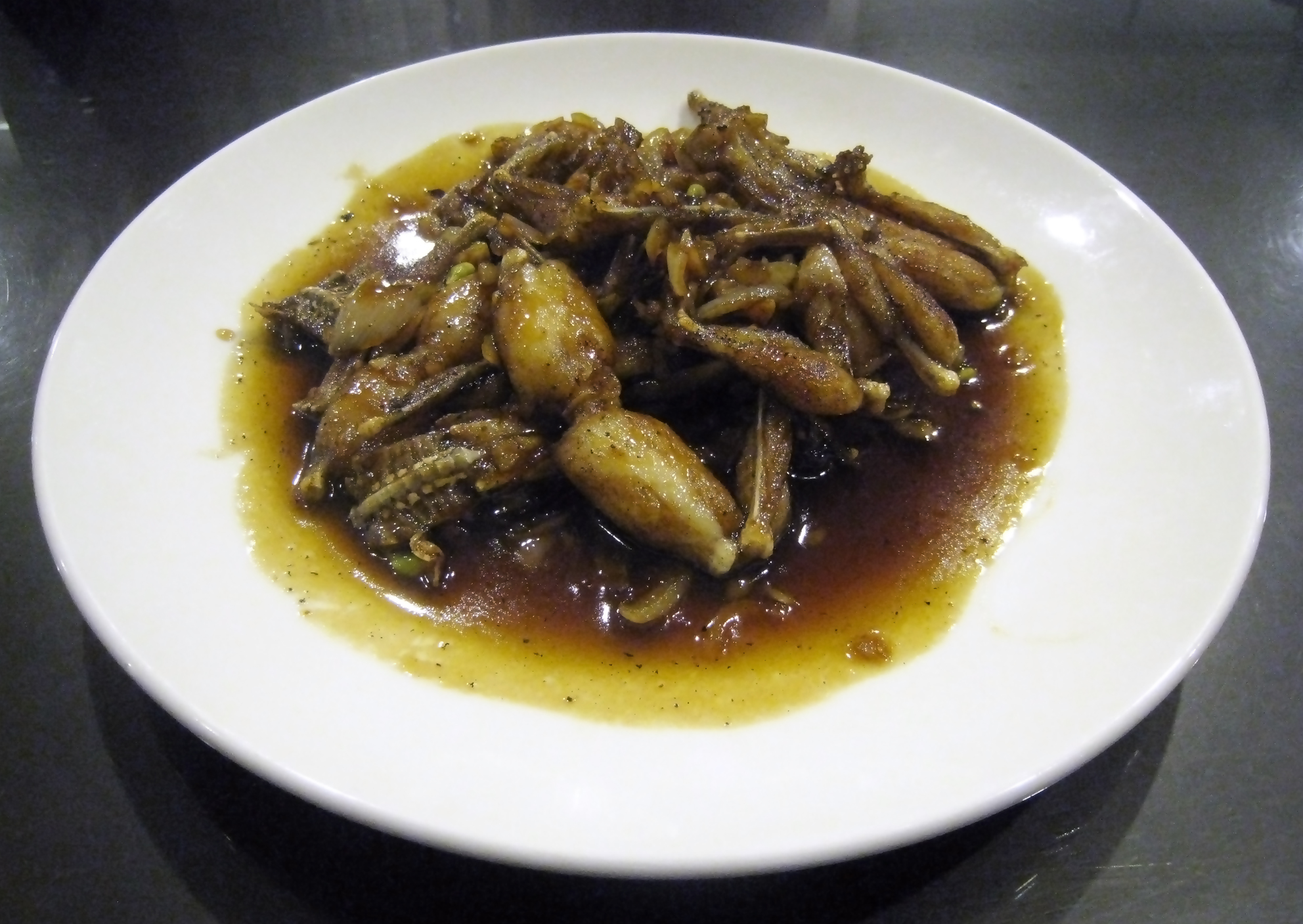
Swike goreng mentega; stir-fried swikee in margarine sauce

Swikee can be served in soup or stir fried according to the applied sauce.

- Swikee oh, kodok oh or swike kuah tauco, frog legs in fermented soybean sauce (tauco) soup.
- Swikee goreng mentega, stir fried frog legs in butter or margarine with Worcestershire sauce
- Swikee kecap, stir fried frog legs in sweet soy sauce
- Swikee saus tomat, stir fried frog legs in tomato sauce
- Swikee asam manis, fried frog legs in sweet and sour sauce
- Swikee tongseng, frog legs cooked in tongseng style Javanese curry
- Swikee rica, stir fried frog legs in spicy rica-rica sauce
- Swikee goreng tepung, deep fried battered frog legs
- Swikee goreng mayones, deep fried battered frog legs served with mayonnaise
- Pepes swikee, seasoned boneless frog legs cooked in banana leaf as pepes, another variant is pepes telur kodok, the frog eggs cooked in banana leaf.
- Rambak swikee, deep fried frog skin consumed as crispy skin cracker, akin to krupuk kulit

== Issues ==
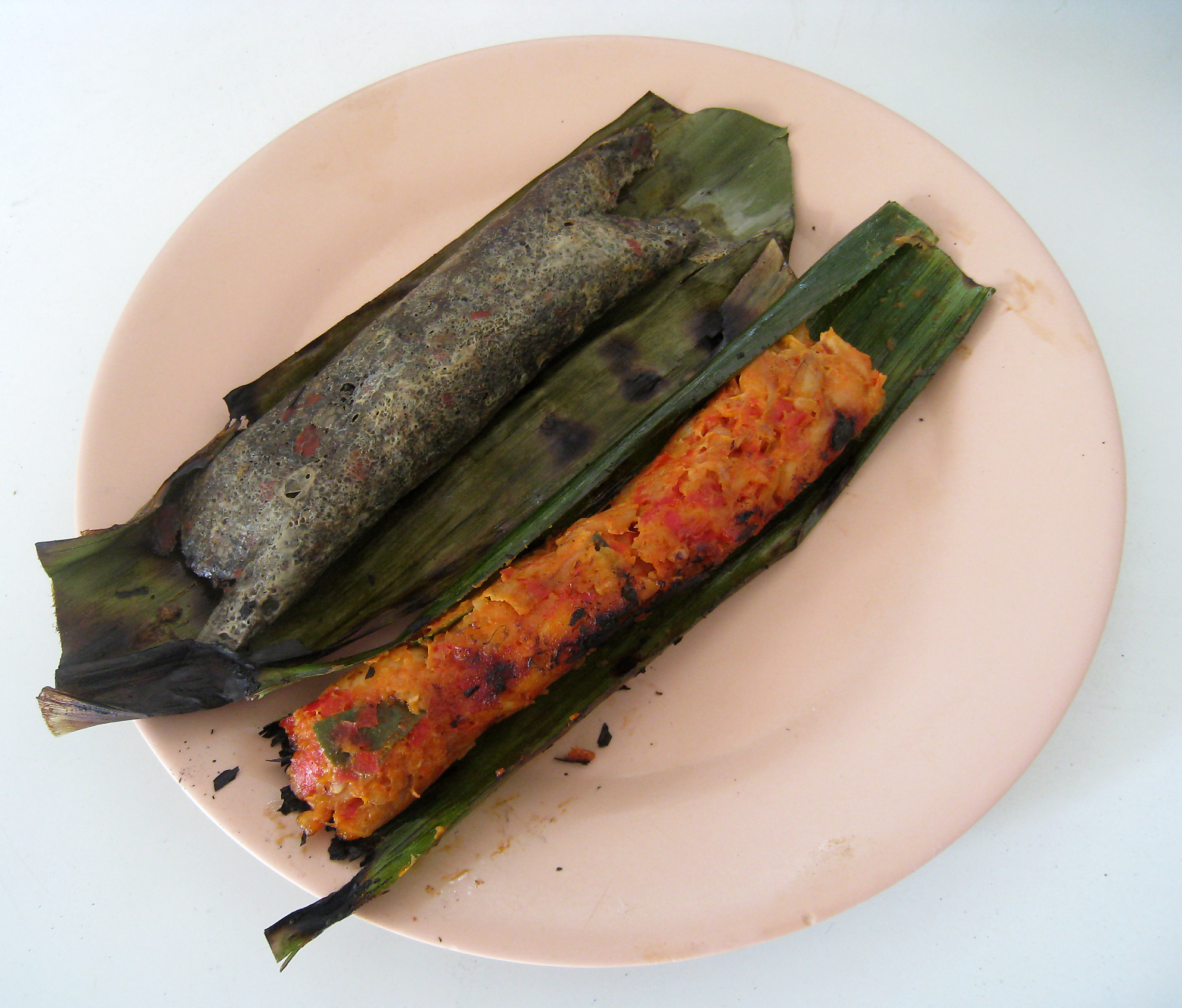
Frog eggs pepes with greyish colour and frog legs pepes with spices including red chili pepper that made it reddish

There are two main issues dealing with frog legs consumption in Indonesia; the religion, and environmental issues. Frog meat is considered haraam (non-halal) according to mainstream Islamic dietary laws. Frog meat fell under non-halal category on two prepositions; the meat to be consumed should not considered disgusting, and frogs together with ants, bees, and sea birds are animals that should not be killed by Muslims. The haraam status of frog legs had sparked controversy in Demak, where the official authority urged swikee restaurant owners not to associate swikee with Demak city, since it would tarnish Demak's image as the first Islamic city in Java, and is also opposed by its inhabitants that mainly follow the Safii school that forbids the consumption of frog.

Within Islamic dietary law, there are some debates and differences about the consumption of frog legs. The mainstream Islamic madhhab (schools) of Safii, Hanafi, and Hanbali strictly forbid the consumption of frog. However, according to the Maliki school certain types of frogs are allowed to be consumed; namely the green frog commonly found in ricefields, while other species especially with blistered skin are considered poisonous, unclean and disgusting and should not be consumed.

Environment activists have urged restrictions on frog consumption — especially frogs harvested from the wild — because frogs are an essential element of the ecosystem. Moreover, in Java a variant of swikee delicacy uses frog eggs that mostly collected from the wild and cooked it in banana leaf as pepes. Conservationists have warned that frogs could be going the same way as the cod — gastronomic demand is depleting regional populations to the point of no return. Like most amphibians, frogs with their thin and moist skin are sensitive to environmental changes and pollution. The population of amphibians is threatened and declining globally due to habitat degradation, environmental destruction, and pollution.

== See also ==
- Chinese Indonesian cuisine
- Peranakan cuisine
