= Frog legs =

Delicacies of French and Cantonese cuisine

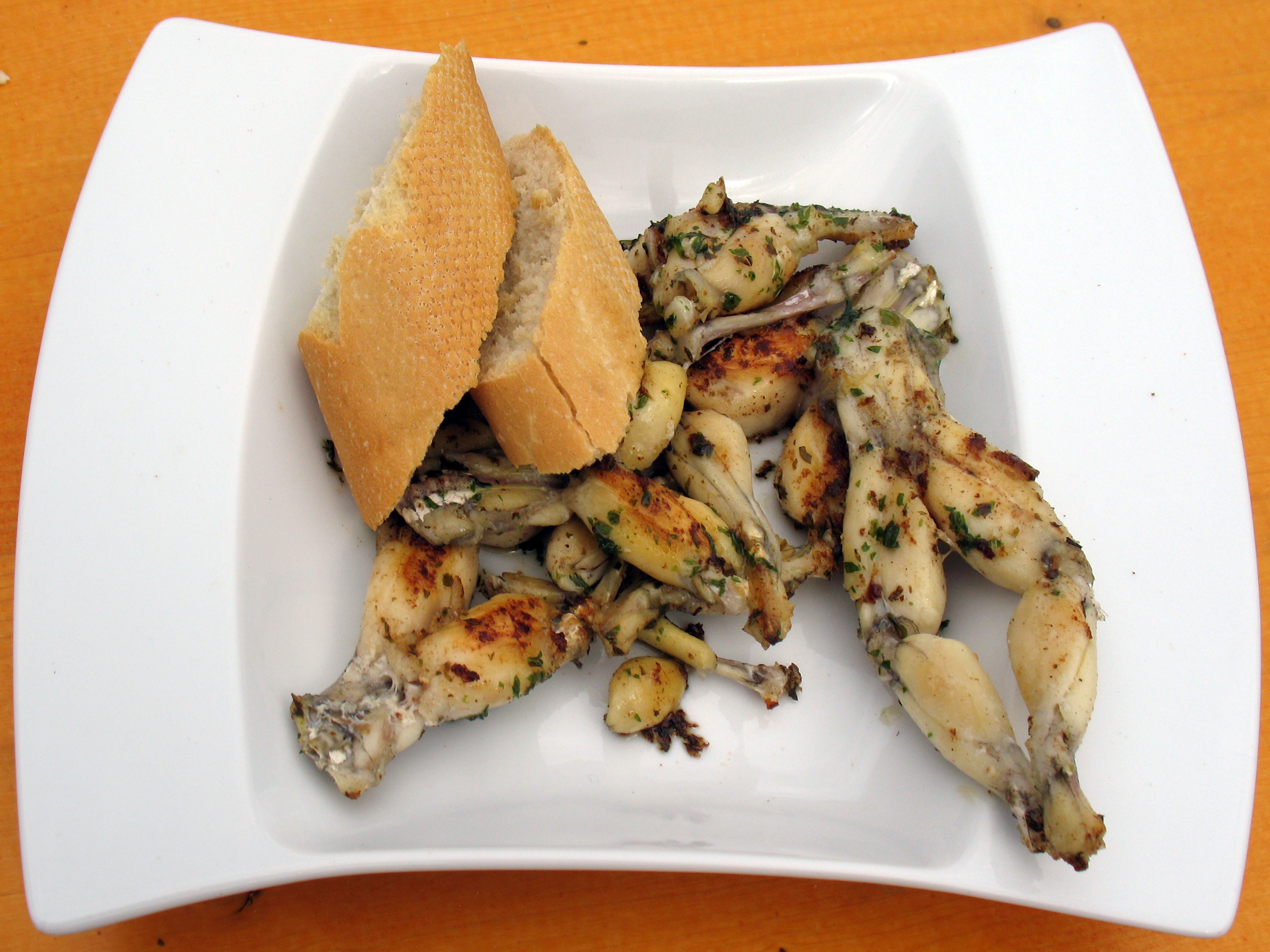
Cuisses de grenouille served with slices of baguette in France

Frog legs (French: Cuisses de grenouille) are the muscular hindlimbs of frogs that are consumed as food by humans in some cuisines. Frog legs are rich in protein, omega-3 fatty acids, vitamin A, and potassium. They are often said to taste like chicken because of the mild flavor, with a texture most similar to chicken wings. The taste and texture of frog meat are approximately between chicken and fish. Frog muscles do not resolve rigor mortis as quickly as skeletal muscles from warm-blooded animals (chicken, for example) do, so heat from cooking can cause fresh frog legs to twitch when in the pan.

Frog legs are eaten in many countries, and in French cuisine they are considered a national delicacy. As of 2014, the world's largest exporter of edible frogs is Indonesia, followed by China. In Brazil, Mexico, and the Caribbean, many frogs are still caught wild. Edible frogs are raised commercially in certain countries, including Vietnam. Ethical concerns have been raised about the trade due to minimal transparency or regulation over supply chains, disruption of ecosystems, and inhumane treatment during slaughter.

== In world cuisines ==
=== Albania ===
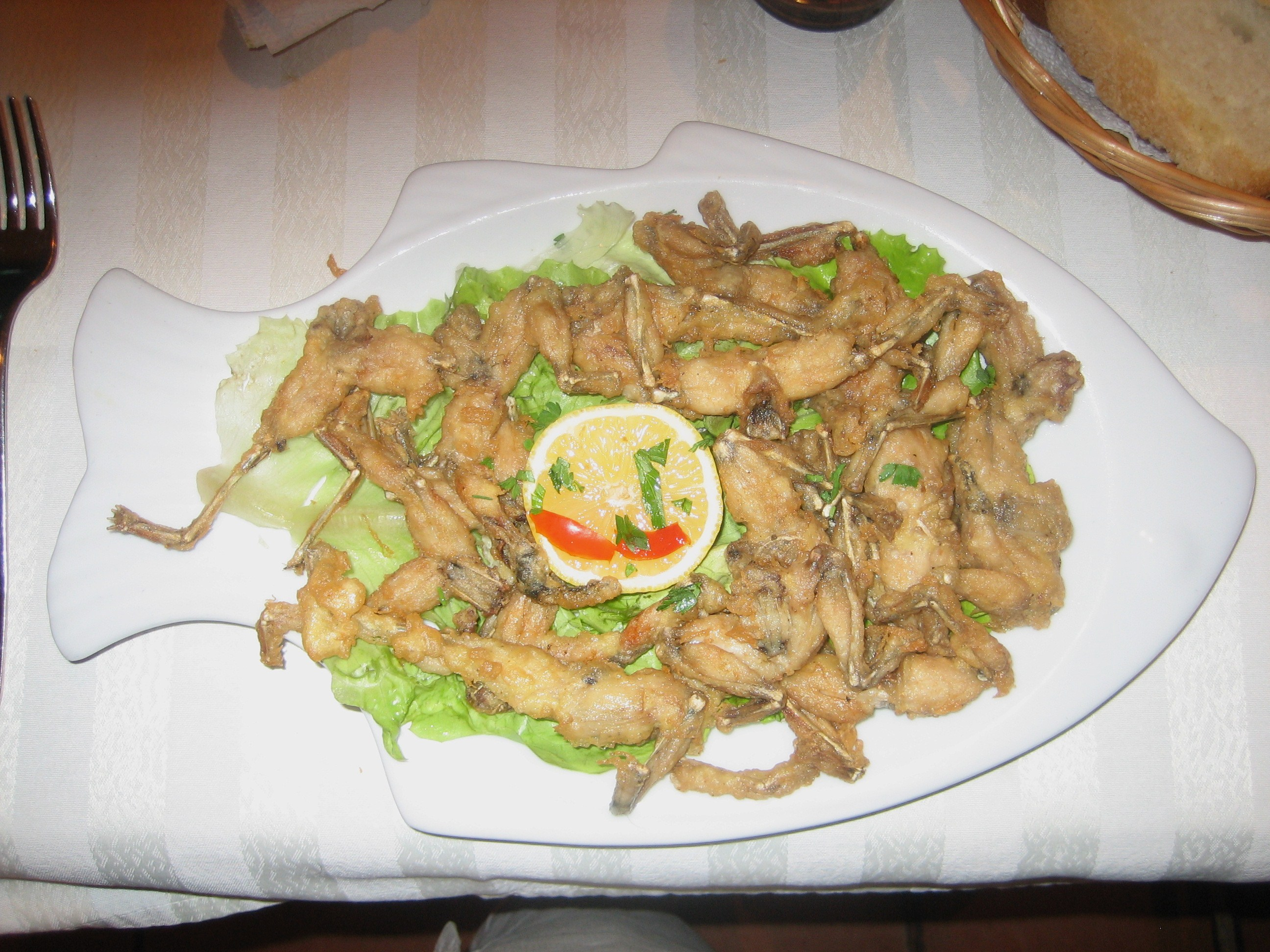
Albanian fried frog leg dish served with lime

In Albania, frog legs are regarded as a delicacy. Frogs are mostly collected from the wild.

=== Australia, New Zealand and Canada ===
In Australia and New Zealand, frogs are considered more exotic; they are generally consumed in Asian or French restaurants, with a primary focus on the hind legs. In Canada, they are somewhat more common, particularly in the eastern and northeastern parts of the country.

=== Caribbean ===
Mountain chickens (Leptodactylus fallax) are frogs named for their habitat and flavor which are eaten in Montserrat and Dominica. The frogs are now critically endangered.

=== China ===
In culinary environment, frogs are known in Chinese as tiánjī (Chinese: 田鸡, literally 'field chicken'). Frog legs (traditional Chinese: 田雞腿; simplified Chinese: 田鸡腿; pinyin: Tiánjī tuǐ) are also eaten in China, but are generally restricted to Southern Chinese cuisine traditions such as Cantonese and Sichuan cuisine. Bullfrogs and pig frogs are farmed on a large scale in some areas of China, such as Sichuan.

In Chinese cuisine, frog legs are usually stir-fried and mixed with light spices, stewed, fried, or made into congee.

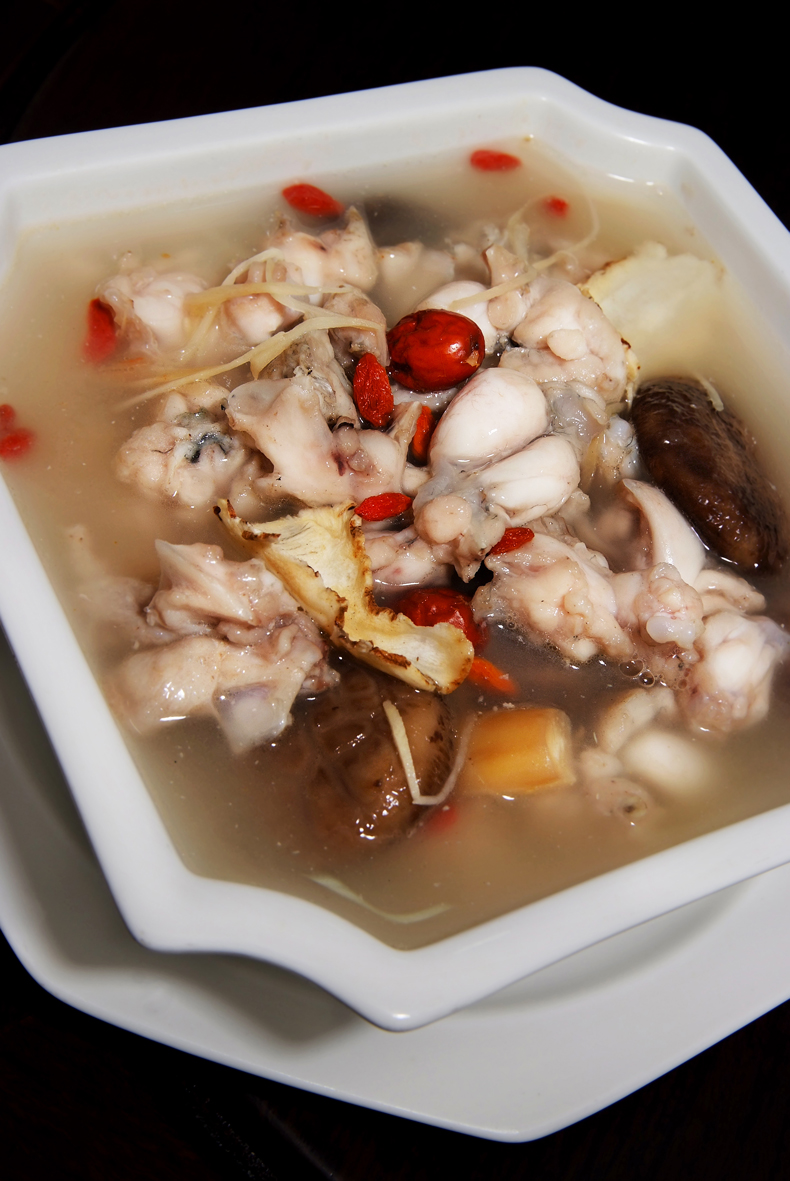
Chinese-style Singaporean herbal frog leg soup served at the Zi Yean Restaurant

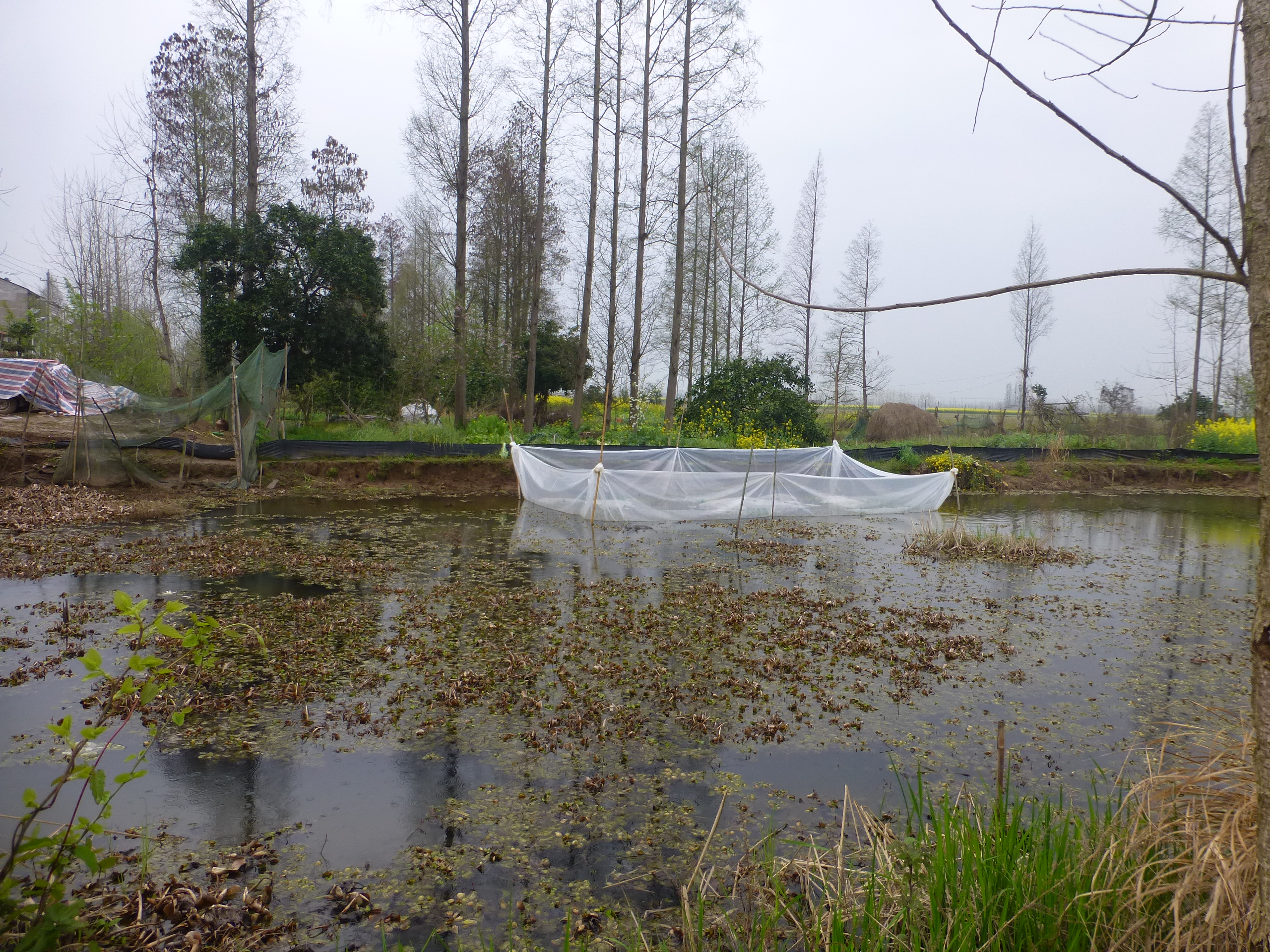
Frogs being raised for food in a enclosure in a pond in Yanwo Town, Honghu City, Hubei, China

=== Croatia ===
Frog legs are popular in some parts of Croatia, especially in the Gorski Kotar region in the northwest of the country. They are considered a specialty in the Lokve municipality, where they are served cooked, fried, or in a stew, sometimes with polenta on the side.

=== France ===
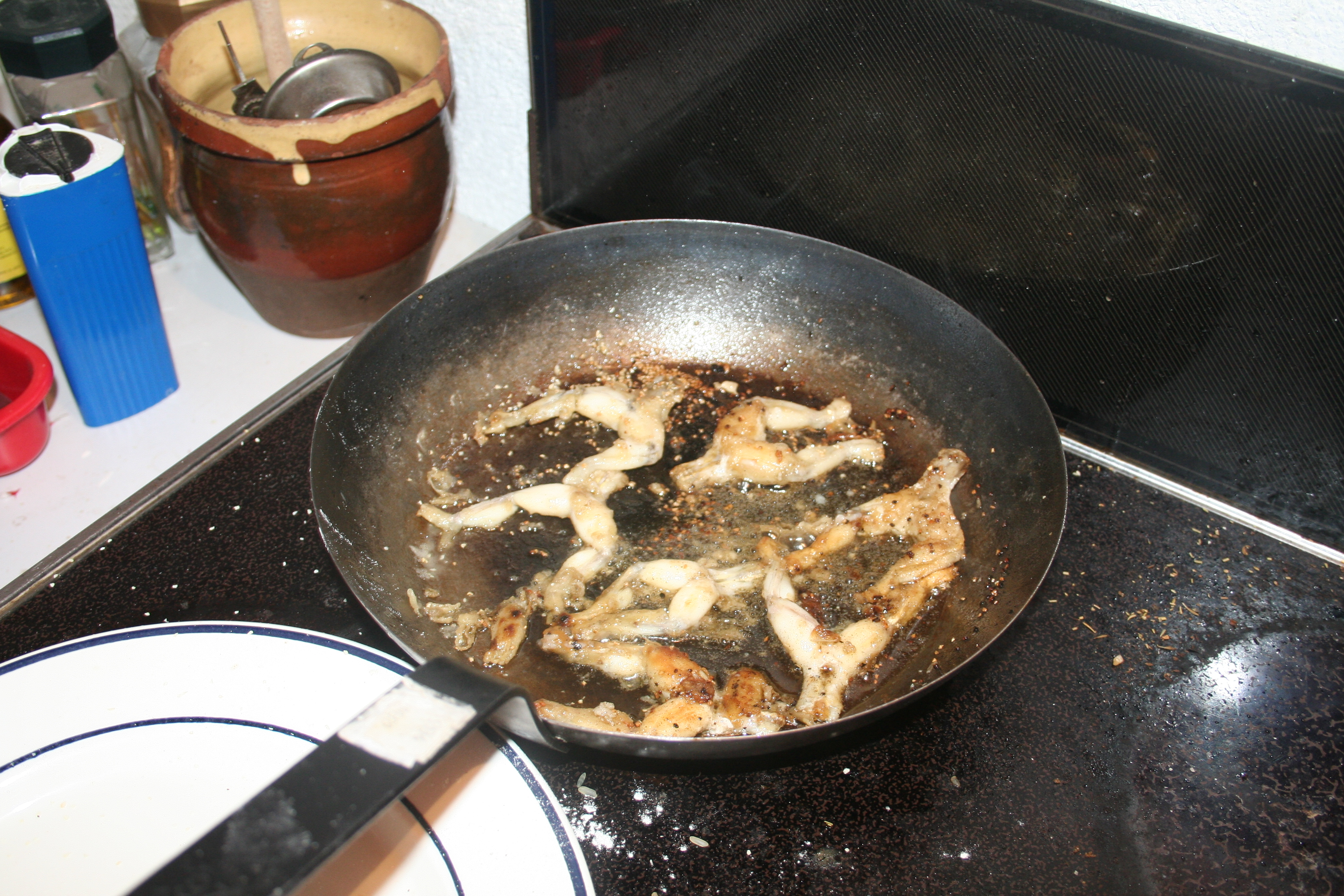
Frogs legs frying in a pan in France

Frog legs, or cuisses de grenouille as it is known in France, are a traditional dish particularly found in the region of the Dombes (département of Ain). Eaten for over a thousand years, they have been part of the national diet of France. Roughly 4,000 tonnes of frog legs are consumed every year in France.

=== Greece ===
In Greece, frog legs are particularly associated with the city of Ioannina and its adjacent lake Pamvotida.

=== Indonesia ===
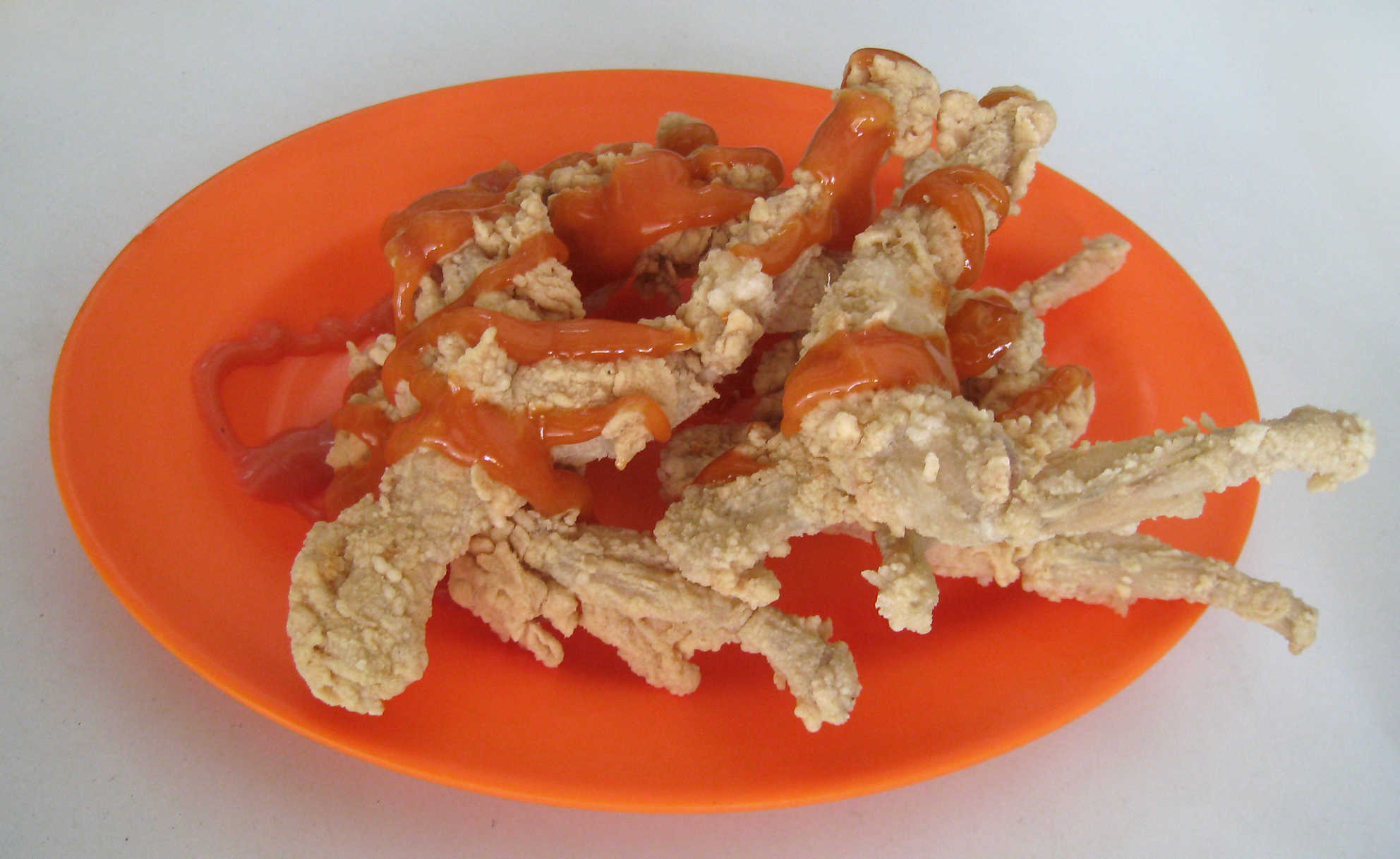
Battered deep-fried frog legs with spicy mayonnaise in Indonesia

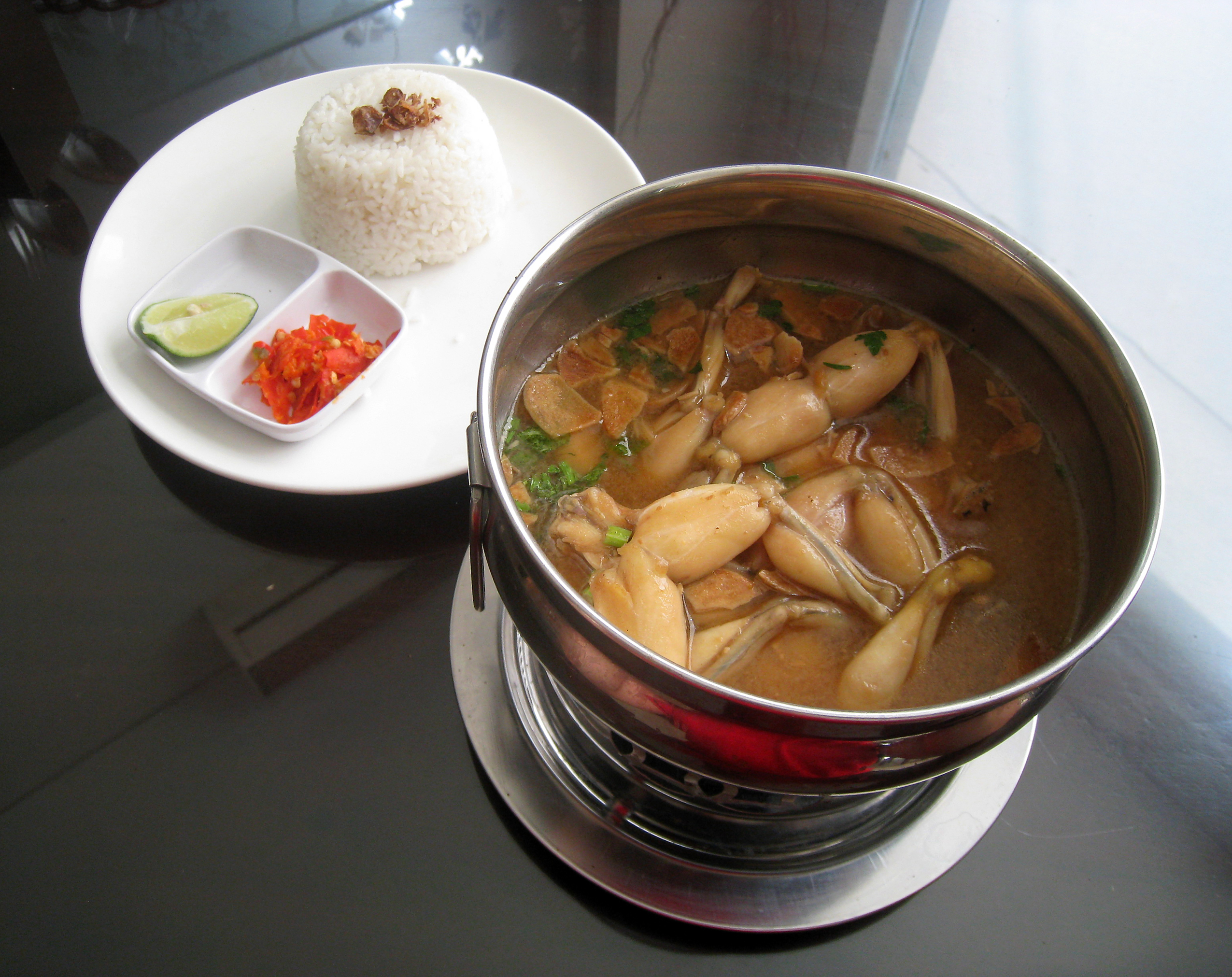
Swikee Kodok Oh, frog legs in tauco soup served with rice at a Chinese Indonesian restaurant in Jakarta

In Indonesian cuisine, frog-leg soup is known as swikee or swike, most probably brought by the Chinese community in Indonesia and popular in Chinese Indonesian cuisine. Swikee is mainly frog-leg soup with a strong taste of garlic, gingers, and fermented soya beans (tauco), accompanied by celery or parsley leaves. Swikee is a typical dish from Purwodadi, Grobogan in Central Java province. Frog legs are also fried in margarine and sweet soy sauce or tomato sauce, battered and deep fried, or grilled. Frog eggs are also served in banana leaves (pepes telur kodok). The dried and crispy fried frog skin is also consumed as krupuk crackers; the taste is similar to fried fish skin.

Indonesia is the world's largest exporter of frog meat, exporting more than 5,000 tonnes of frog meat each year, mostly to France, Belgium, and Luxembourg. Most of the supply of frog legs in Western Europe originates from frog farms in Indonesia; however, there is concern that frog legs from Indonesia are poached from wild populations, which may endanger wild amphibians.

=== Italy ===
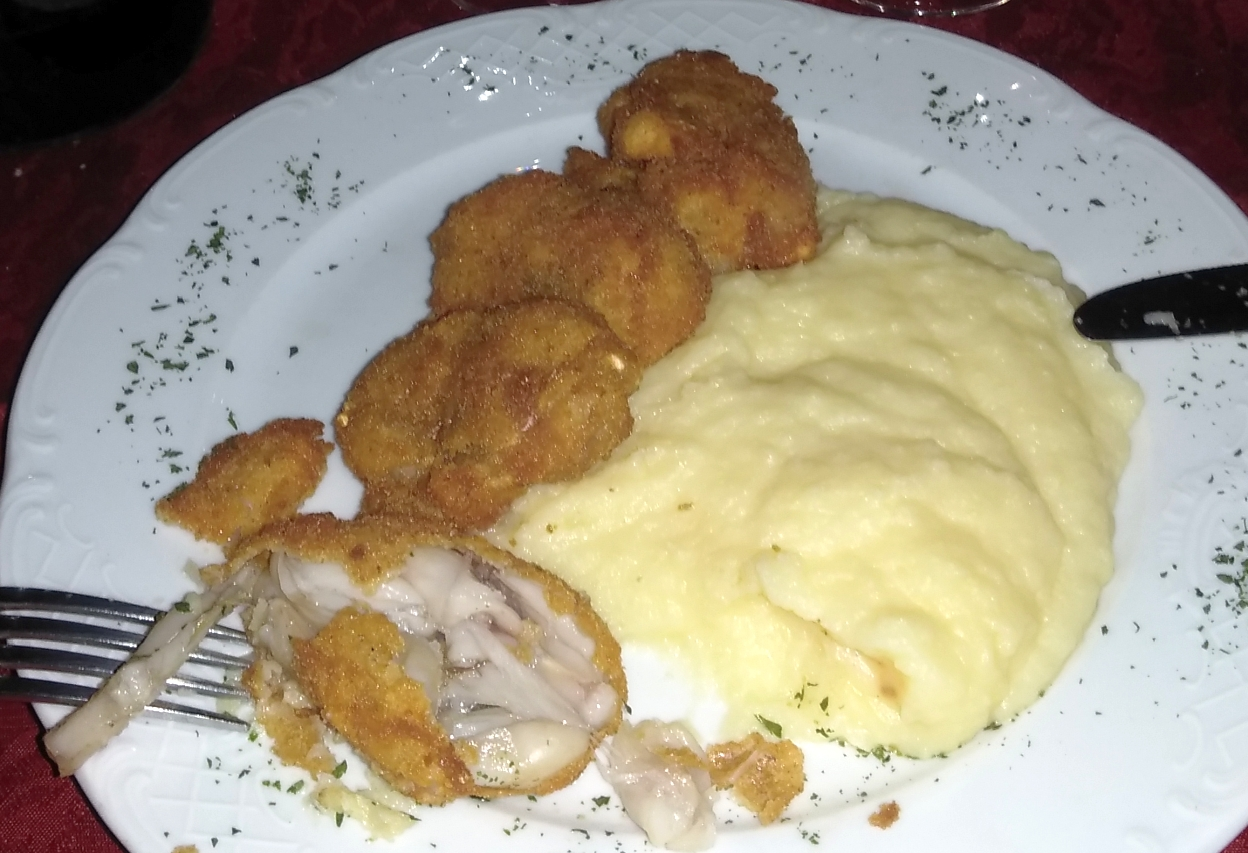
Breadcrumbed frog legs from Piedmont, Italy

Frogs are a common food in the northern part of Italy, especially throughout Piemonte and Lombardy and within these two regions especially in the Vercelli area in Piemonte and in the Pavia and Lomellina areas in Lombardy. In these places, frogs are part of the ancient culinary tradition and a typical staple food. The consumption of frogs is mainly related to the availability of animals due to the rural activities and typical agriculture in these places.

The large presence of frogs is mainly due to the agriculture typical of these areas which have always been known for their rice. The large cultivation of rice means that there is a large presence of artificial water channels used to flood rice fields during the growing season, which makes a perfect habitat for frogs. During the growth period when fields stay flooded, and even more during the draining of the fields, farmers and others often gather to go frog hunting armed with nets. Some towns even organize collective hunting sessions and games.

Frogs have gained much culinary relevance in these areas, with many rural towns hosting food festivals called sagre – centered on frogs – where frogs are prepared in various ways. They typically take place during the rice-harvesting periods. With frog consumption closely connected to rice production and being the native land of the Italian dish risotto, one of the most common dishes is frog risotto, risotto alle rane. Other local frog dishes include them being dipped in egg batter, breadcrumbed and then fried, or in soups and stews.

=== Mexico ===
The harvesting of frog legs is customarily carried out in states such as Baja California, Chihuahua, Jalisco, Sonora, Tamaulipas, Veracruz, Zacatecas, and a large portion of Mexico’s Central Plateau. It takes place almost year-round, and the legs are consumed fried, in soups, broths, or stews—such as frog legs in green sauce.

=== Romania ===
In Romania, edible frogs are known as pui de baltă ('pond chicken'). The legs are eaten breaded and fried.

=== Slovenia ===
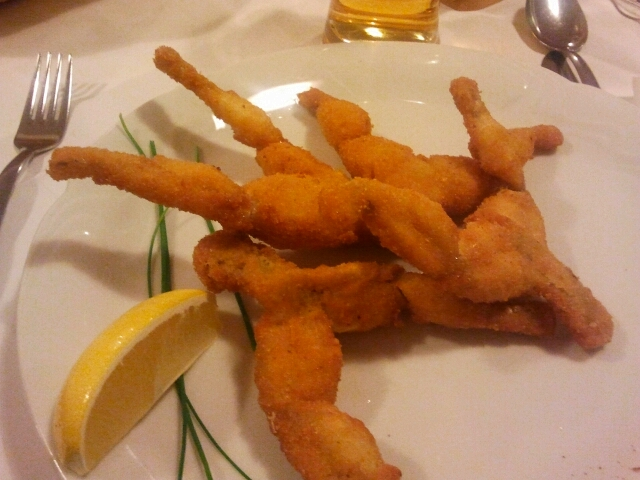
A Slovenian specialty, fried frog legs (žabji kraki) with lemon and tartar sauce

Frog legs (žabji kraki) are a popular dish in Slovenian cuisine, especially in areas of eastern Slovenia (Prekmurje and north-eastern Styria). They are also quite popular in the country's capital, Ljubljana, and have been considered the "basis of the traditional city cuisine of Ljubljana". Up to modern times, they have been traditionally considered Lenten food and were especially popular in spring. They are also a popular traditional dish in the Vipava Valley, in western Slovenia, and are served in numerous restaurants throughout the Slovenian Littoral.

=== Spain ===
In the western part of Spain, Extremadura and Castilla y Leon, frog legs are served deep-fried. They constitute a delicacy for the local inhabitants. Frog legs also hold great culinary value along the banks of the Ebro.

=== Ukraine ===
Fried frog legs are a specialty of the small city of Vylkove in Odesa Oblast, Ukraine, but they have also gained popularity in Odesa.

=== United Kingdom ===
In 2013, archaeologists digging at Blick Mead, Wiltshire found the remains of a cooked frog leg which was served as part of a feast in c. 7,000 BC during the Mesolithic era. However, in the modern era frog legs are widely regarded as "repellent" in Britain. "Frog" has been used as an anti-French slur in the English-speaking world since the late 18th century. During the late 19th century, French restaurateur Auguste Escoffier tried to rename them "nymphs" in a vain attempt to sell them to London diners. In recent decades, several British celebrity chefs have introduced frog leg dishes to their menus, notably Heston Blumenthal, whose recipes have included frog blancmange.

=== United States ===
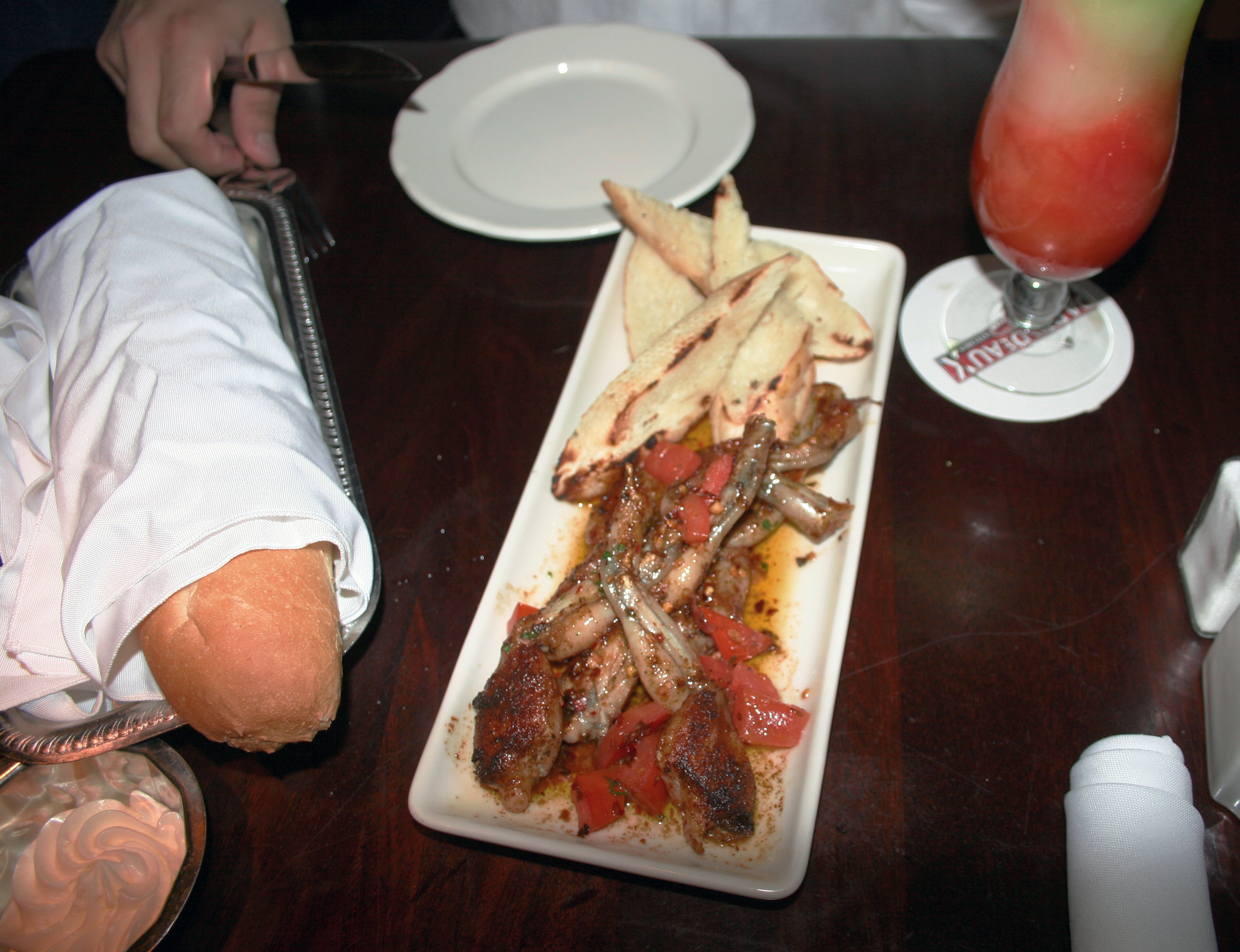
Frog legs is a popular gourmet and appetizer in the Southern United States, here at the Pappadeaux Seafood Kitchen.

Frog legs are eaten in parts of the Southern United States, particularly in the Deep South and Gulf states where French influence is more prominent, including South Carolina, Georgia, Florida, Alabama, Mississippi, and Louisiana. The legs are almost always served battered and fried. The Fellsmere Frog Leg Festival in Florida celebrates the dish every January. They are also eaten in Eastern states, but not as commonly. Frog legs are a popular dish in Cleveland, Ohio, especially in its Little Italy and Asiatown neighborhoods. The most common kinds of frogs eaten are bullfrogs and leopard frogs, as these are abundant in most of the country, including the South. Although the consumption of wild native frogs is generally discouraged, the harvest and cooking of invasive bullfrogs, especially in the Western US, has been encouraged as a form of control and to promote local cuisine.

Some methods of cooking include egg-/cracker-crumb breading or battered. They are either fried or grilled. Deep-fried frog legs can also be found at fairs.

Raccoons, possums, partridges, prairie hens, and frogs were among the fare Mark Twain recorded as part of American cuisine.

== Issues ==
=== Trade ===
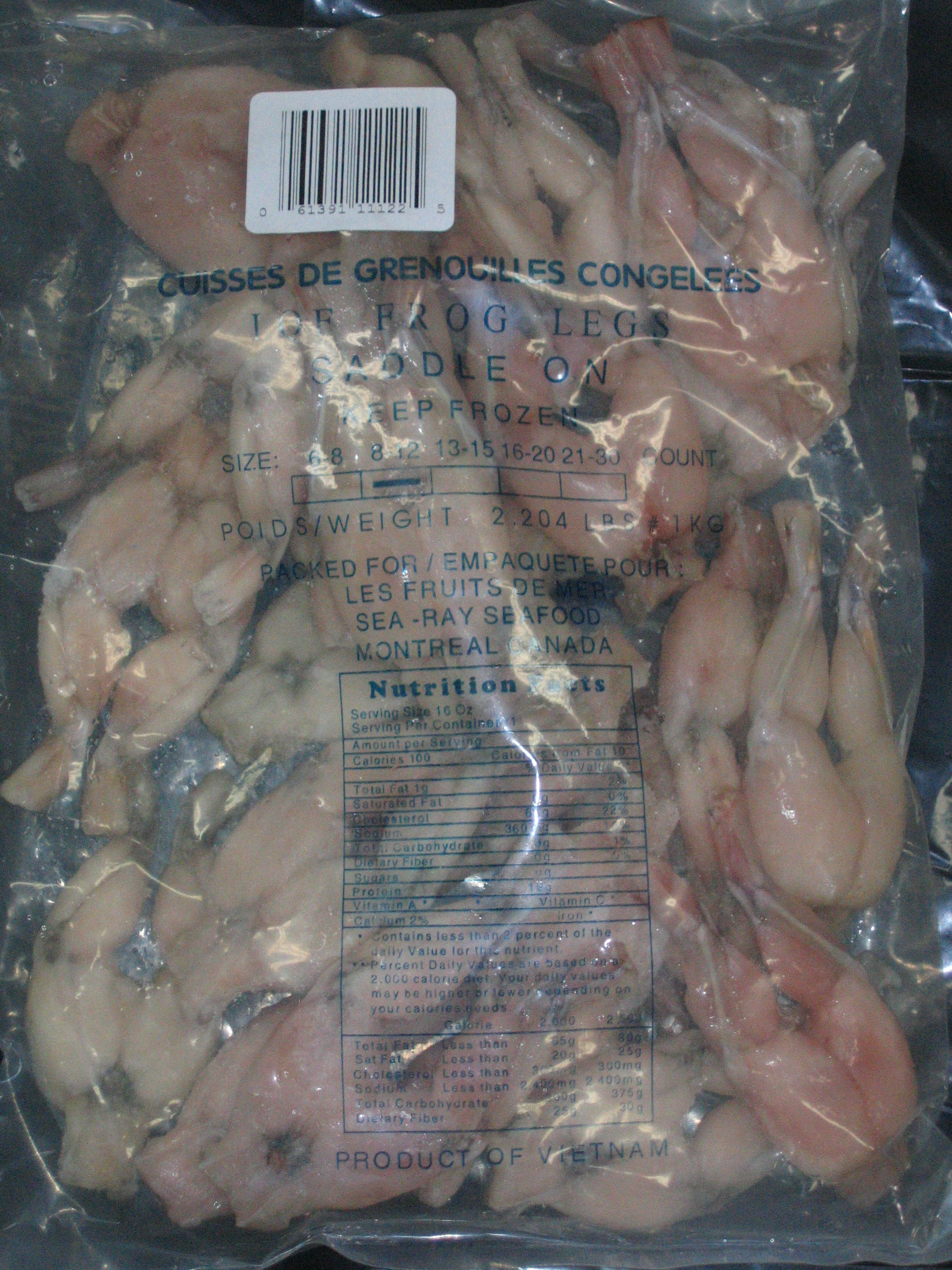
A vacuumed bag of frozen frog legs imported from Vietnam

Each year about US$40 million worth of frog legs are traded internationally, with most countries in the world participating in this trade. The world's top importers of frog legs are France, Belgium, and the United States, while the biggest international exporters are Indonesia and China. While these figures do not account for domestic consumption, when production from frog farms is taken into account, it is conservatively estimated that humans consume up to 3.2 billion frogs for food around the world every year.

=== Health ===
Movement of live or unfrozen, unskinned amphibians is a potential way for deadly amphibian diseases such as Batrachochytrium dendrobatidis and Ranavirus to be transported around the world, and despite recommendations on preventing disease spread from the World Organisation for Animal Health, which regulates the international spread of epizootic diseases, few countries have adopted these recommendations as law.

In Canada, the sale of fresh or frozen frog legs is illegal unless they are determined free from bacteria of the genus Salmonella, as per the official method MFO-10, Microbial Examination of Froglegs.

=== Environmental concerns and animal welfare ===
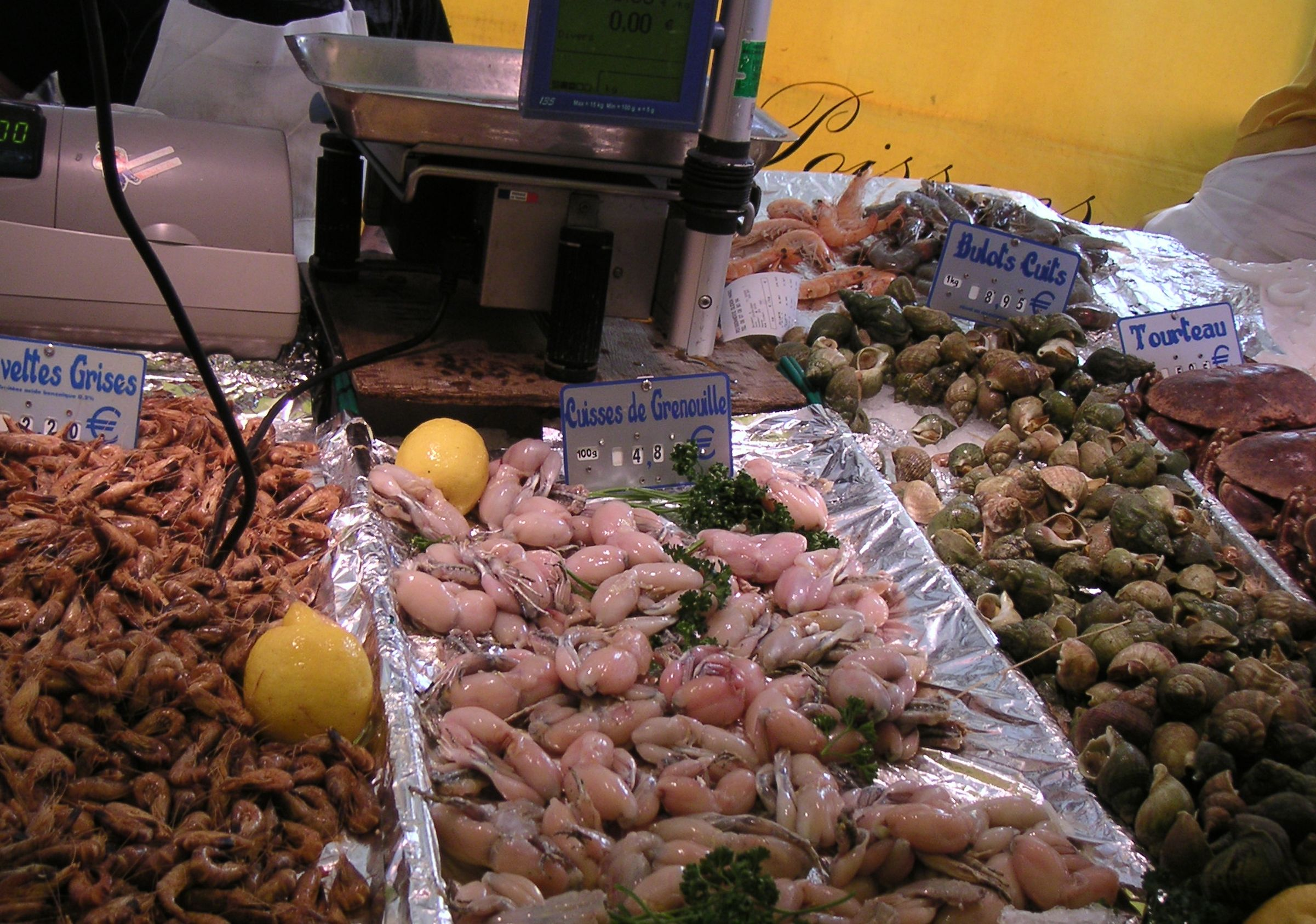
Fresh frog legs sold in a market in Paris, France

Many environmentalists urge the restriction of frog consumption—especially those harvested from the wild—because amphibian populations are declining and frogs are an essential element of ecosystems. Conservationists warn that gastronomic demand for frogs is seriously depleting regional populations. Frogs are sensitive to environmental changes, disease, habitat degradation, and pollution. Animal welfare advocates raise ethical concerns with harvest practices, as wild frogs are typically dismembered while alive and then left to die.

As most of the frog production comes from wild harvesting rather than frog farms, over-exploitation in the frog exporting countries like Indonesia, Turkey and Albania has caused a rapid decrease in frog population, and endangered some species. Also, due to this intense harvesting the increase in the usage of pesticides have been observed.

The exception to this is where the American bullfrog is not native and has been introduced. In these ecosystems, American bullfrogs can decimate local amphibian populations, upset ecosystem balance, and have negative impacts on other species of wildlife as well.

A 2011 paper raised animal welfare concerns over methods such as live removal of legs and methods of hunting, recommending that countries of origin "establish humane standards to govern the capture, handling, packaging and export of live frogs and for the capture, handling, killing, and processing of frogs used for food to minimize animal suffering". This was corroborated by the authors of a 2022 paper, who called for the end of the common practice of cutting frog's legs with axes and scissors, without anesthesia.

=== Religious ===
According to Jewish dietary laws, all reptiles and amphibians are considered unclean animals. Therefore, frog legs are not kosher, and are forbidden to observant Jews in Orthodox Judaism. However, more liberal streams of Judaism such as Reform do not prohibit the eating of non-kosher animals. Traditional Judaism also includes universal laws that define which activities are considered sinful even for non-Jews according to Jewish law, known as the Noahide laws. Under this rubric, there is a prohibition against eating limbs taken from live animals, known as eiver min hachai; thus, Jewish law would consider it to be sinful for any person to eat frogs legs that were removed from live frogs. This is also considered to be under the prohibition of cruelty to animals, which liberal Jewish streams accept as forbidden just as traditional Judaism considers to be forbidden.

Frog meat is considered as haraam (non-halal) according to some Islamic dietary laws. Those who consider it haraam cite the hadith that prohibits the killing of frogs, together with ants, bees, and seabirds. This haraam status has caused controversy in Demak, Indonesia, where the authorities urged the (frog leg soup) restaurant owners not to associate swikee with Demak town, since it would tarnish Demak's image as the first Islamic city/town in Java, and also opposed by its inhabitants that mainly follow the Shafi'i school, which forbids the consumption of frogs. The Islamic madhhab (school) of Shafi'i, Hanafi and Hanbali strictly forbids the consumption of frogs, but in the Maliki school, opinions vary between the consumption of all frogs being halal, to only the green frog commonly found in rice fields being halal, while other species, especially those with blistered skin, are considered to be unclean.

In medieval and early modern Europe, frogs were not classified as meat and could therefore be eaten during the Christian fast of Lent, along with fish and bird flesh. Monks in Lorraine were recorded as eating frogs during Lent in the 13th century. The famous French chef Grimod de La Reynière wrote in the early 19th century that frogs were known as Alouettes de Carême (Lenten larks).
