= Buntil =

Indonesian grated coconut meat dish

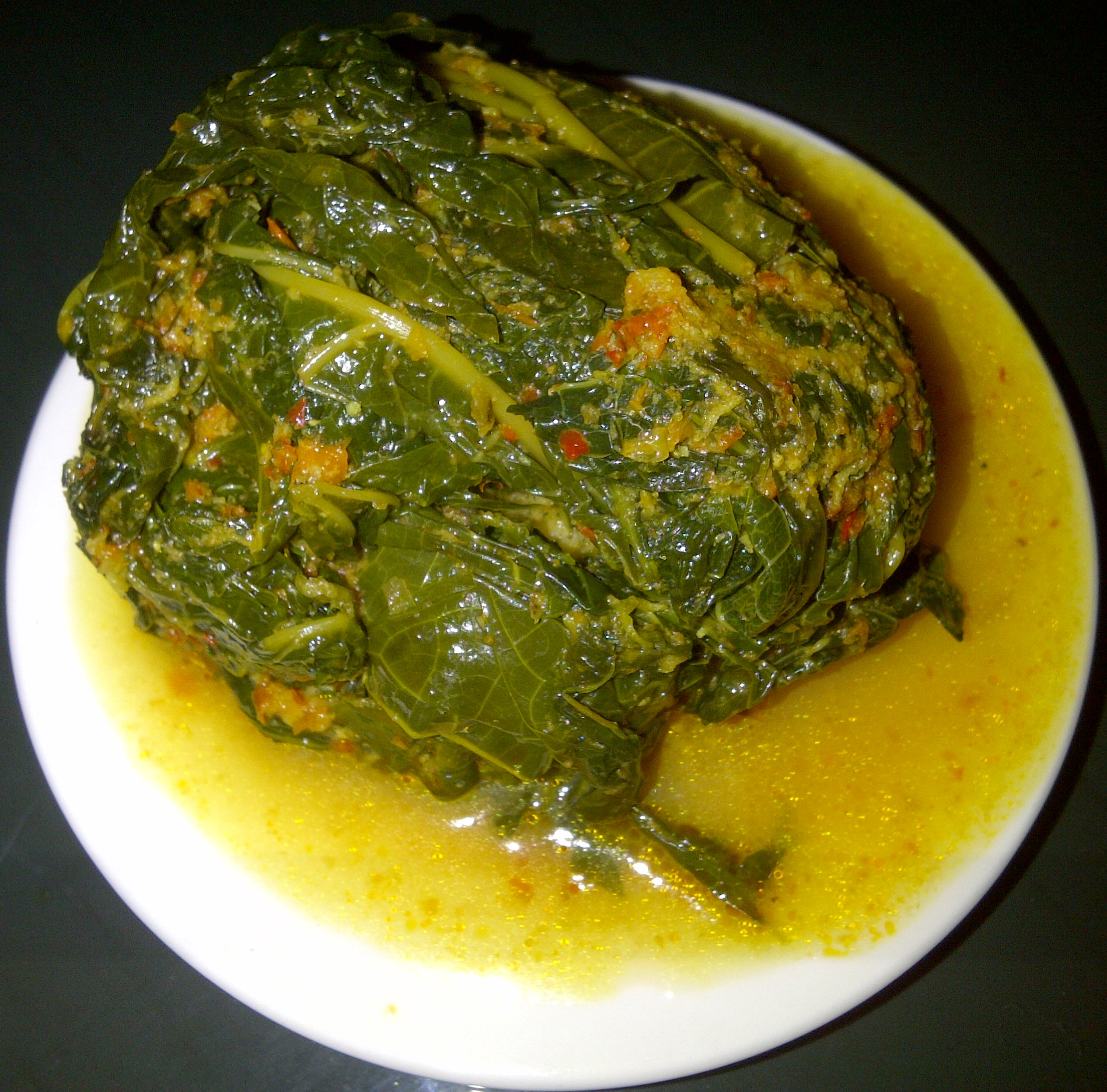
- Buntil in yellow turmeric and coconut milk spice
- Course: Main course
- Place of origin: Indonesia
- Region or state: Central Java and East Java
- Serving temperature: Hot or room temperature
- Main ingredients: Papaya, taro, or cassava leaves filled with grated coconut and anchovies, boiled in coconut milk

Buntil is a traditional Indonesian-Javanese dish of grated coconut meat mixed with teri (anchovies) and spices, wrapped in papaya, cassava, or taro (or other similar aroids) leaves, then boiled in coconut milk and spices. It is a favourite dish in Java, and other than cooked homemade, it is also sold in warungs, restaurants or street side foodstalls, especially traditional temporary market during Ramadhan, prior of breaking the fast.

== See also ==
- Botok
- Pepes
- Krechek
- Gudeg
- Sambal jengot (hot spicy sauce made from grated young coconut)
- Serat Centhini, a cookbook written in 1824
- Laing (food)
- Sarma (food)
