= Conkie =

Steamed Caribbean corn dish

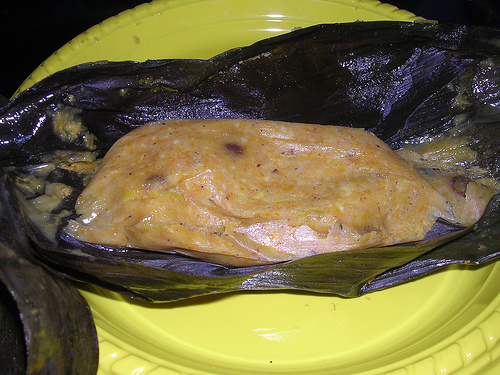
- A conkie
- Region or state: West Indies
- Main ingredients: Corn flour, coconut, sweet potatoes, pumpkin, raisins

Conkies are a sweet cornmeal-based food item popular in the West Indies. The essential ingredients include cornmeal, coconut, sweet potato, raisins and pumpkin and the mixture is cooked by steaming in banana leaves.

== Culture ==
In Barbados, conkies were once associated with the old British colonial celebration of Guy Fawkes Day on November 5. In modern Barbados they are eaten during Independence Day celebrations on November 30.

In Saint Lucia and Trinidad and Tobago it is called paime and is usually associated with Creole Day (Jounen Kwéyòl), which is on the last Sunday of October every year in Saint Lucia.

== See also ==
- Corn cookie
- List of maize dishes
- Pasteles
- Tamale
- Otak-otak
