= Tauco =

Indonesian fermented bean paste

Tauco / Taucu
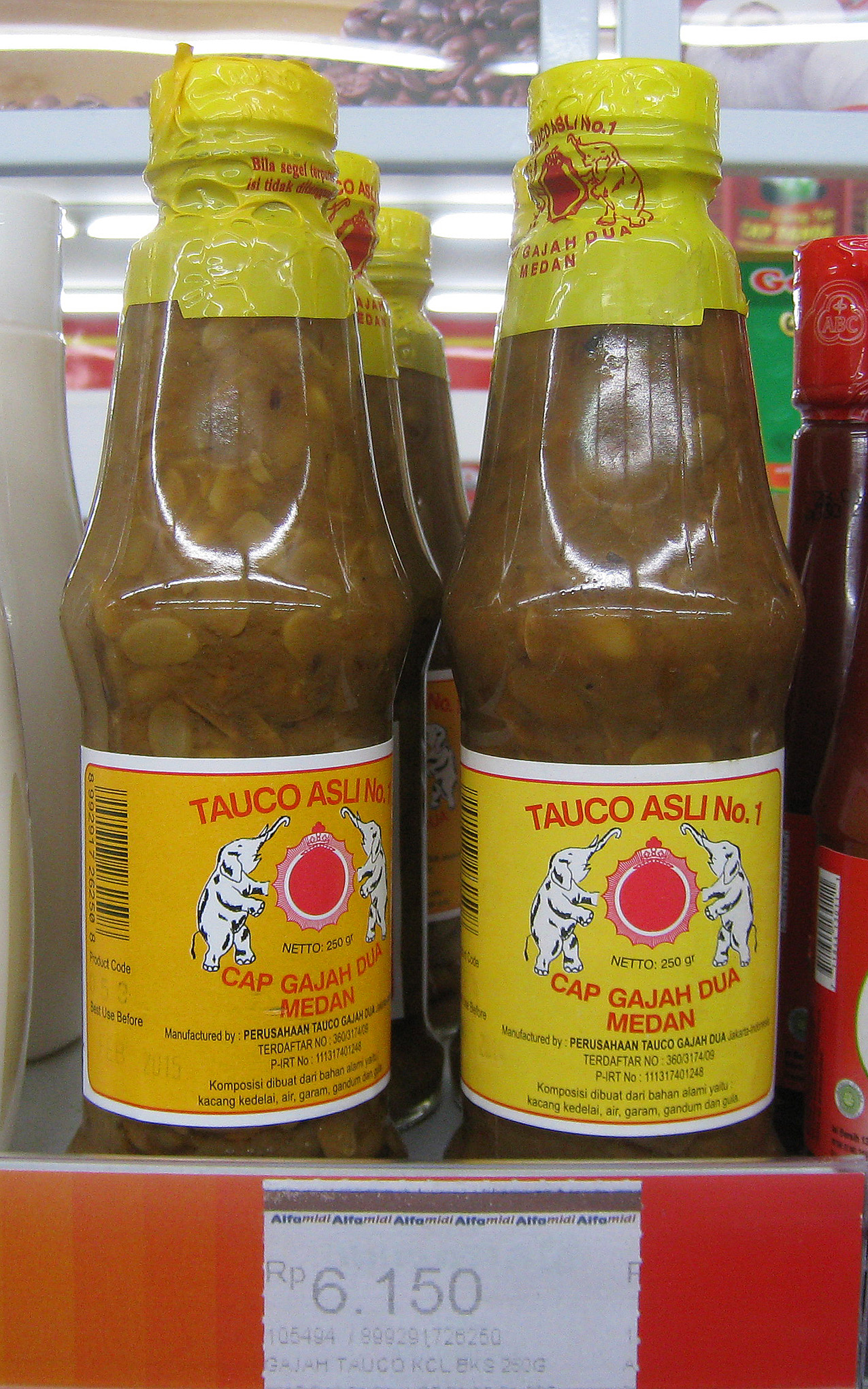
- Bottled tauco on display in an Indonesian supermarket
- Alternative names: Taucu, Tauchu, Tao Jiew
- Type: Cooking sauce and condiment
- Region or state: Southeast Asia
- Associated cuisine: Indonesia, Singapore, Malaysia, Brunei, Thailand
- Created by: Overseas Chinese in Southeast Asia
- Main ingredients: Fermented soy
- Variations: Closely related to douchi

Tauco, Taucu, Taotjo, Tao Jiew or Tauchu (Chinese: 豆醬; pinyin: dòujiàng; Pe̍h-ōe-jī: tāu-chiùⁿ; Thai: เต้าเจี้ยว, RTGS: Taochiao) are various adaptations of the yellow soybean paste from China created by overseas Chinese in Southeast Asia. Tauco is made by boiling yellow soybeans, grinding them, mixing them with flour, and fermenting them to make a soy paste. The soy paste is soaked in salt water and sun-dried for several weeks, furthering the fermentation process, until the color of the paste has turned yellow-reddish. Good tauco has a distinct aroma. The tauco is commonly used by Chinese Indonesians, Malaysian Chinese, Chinese Singaporeans, Chinese Bruneians, and Thai Chinese. It is also used in other Indonesian cuisine traditions, such as Sundanese cuisine and Javanese cuisine, as well as by non-Chinese Malaysians, Singaporeans, Bruneians, and Thais.

The sauce is often used as a condiment and flavouring for stir-fried dishes such as tahu tauco (tofu in tauco sauce), kakap tahu tausi (red snapper with tofu in soybean sauce), in soup such as swikee oh (frog legs in tauco soup) and pie oh (softshell turtle in tauco soup), or stir fried with kangkung (water spinach). The tauco of Indonesia originated from the acculturation between Chinese and Sundanese ethnic groups in Cianjur. Today the major production centre of tauco in Indonesia are in Cianjur in West Java, and Pekalongan in Central Java. In Singapore, Malaysia, and Brunei, the main commercial brand of taucu is Yeo Hiap Seng (Yeo's). In Thailand, the sauce is often used in stir-fries, such as Pad Mee Korat and stir-fried vegetables, and also dipping sauces such as Khao Man Gai.

== See also ==
- Douchi
- Yellow soybean paste
- Fermented bean paste
- List of fermented soy products
- Miso
