= Tristan Farnon =

Tristan Farnon may refer to:

- Tristan A. Farnon, American webcomic author
- Tristan Farnon, character in the works of James Herriot, based on the real-life Brian Sinclair (veterinary surgeon)
