= Farnon =

Farnon may refer to:

- Charmian Anne Farnon (1942–2016), American actress better known as Charmian Carr
- Darlene Farnon (1950–2020), American actress better known as Darleen Carr
- Dennis Farnon (1923–2019), Canadian composer and arranger
- Robert Farnon (1917–2005), Canadian composer, conductor, musical arranger and trumpet player
- Tristan A. Farnon (born 1970), American web comic author
- Siegfried Farnon and Tristan Farnon, characters in the books of James Herriot, based on the real-life brothers Donald and Brian Sinclair
