= Callum Woodhouse =

British actor

- Born: 7 January 1994 (age 32); Stockton-on-Tees, Cleveland, England
- Education: Stockton Sixth Form College
- Occupation: Actor
- Years active: 2015–present

Callum Woodhouse (born 7 January 1994) is a British actor.

== Career ==
He is best known for his portrayal of Leslie Durrell in all four seasons of ITV comedy-drama series The Durrells.

Woodhouse is also known for playing the character of Josh Marsden in ITV comedy-drama series Cold Feet.

He also appeared as Randall Jones in "The Skylark Scandal", a Series 7 episode of BBC One's detective period drama Father Brown.

In the Channel 5/PBS production All Creatures Great and Small about James Herriot, Woodhouse plays Tristan Farnon, the younger brother of the senior partner, Siegfried Farnon. Woodhouse appeared in the first three series. He was not in series 4, but returned again starting in series 5.

Woodhouse is also one of nine presidents for Better Planet Education.

== Filmography ==
Year	Title	Role	Notes
2015	Room 17	The Groom	Short Film
2017	B&B	Paul	
2018	The Hoist	Callum	Short Film
2016, 2019	Cold Feet	Josh Marsden	Series 6 Episode 8 and Series 8 Episode 1
2016–2019	The Durrells	Leslie Durrell	Main Cast
2019	Father Brown	Randall Jones	Series 7 Episode 9
2019	Damaged but Interesting	Art Jenson	Short Film
2020–2022, 2024–present	All Creatures Great and Small	Tristan Farnon	Main Cast
2022	Raven's Hallow	Will Taylor	Film
2023	Paper Cuts	John	Short Film
2024	Big Cat	Warren	Short Film
2025	Orang Ikan	Bronson	Film
2026	The Fortune	Anthony Worrall	Main Cast

== Theatre ==
Year	Title	Role	Writer	Director	Venue
2026	Game of Thrones: The Mad King	Lord Robert Baratheon	Duncan Macmillian	Dominic Cooke	Royal Shakespeare Theatre, Stratford-Upon-Avon
