= The World of James Herriot =

Attraction in North Yorkshire, England

Coordinates: 54.23361°N 1.34485°W

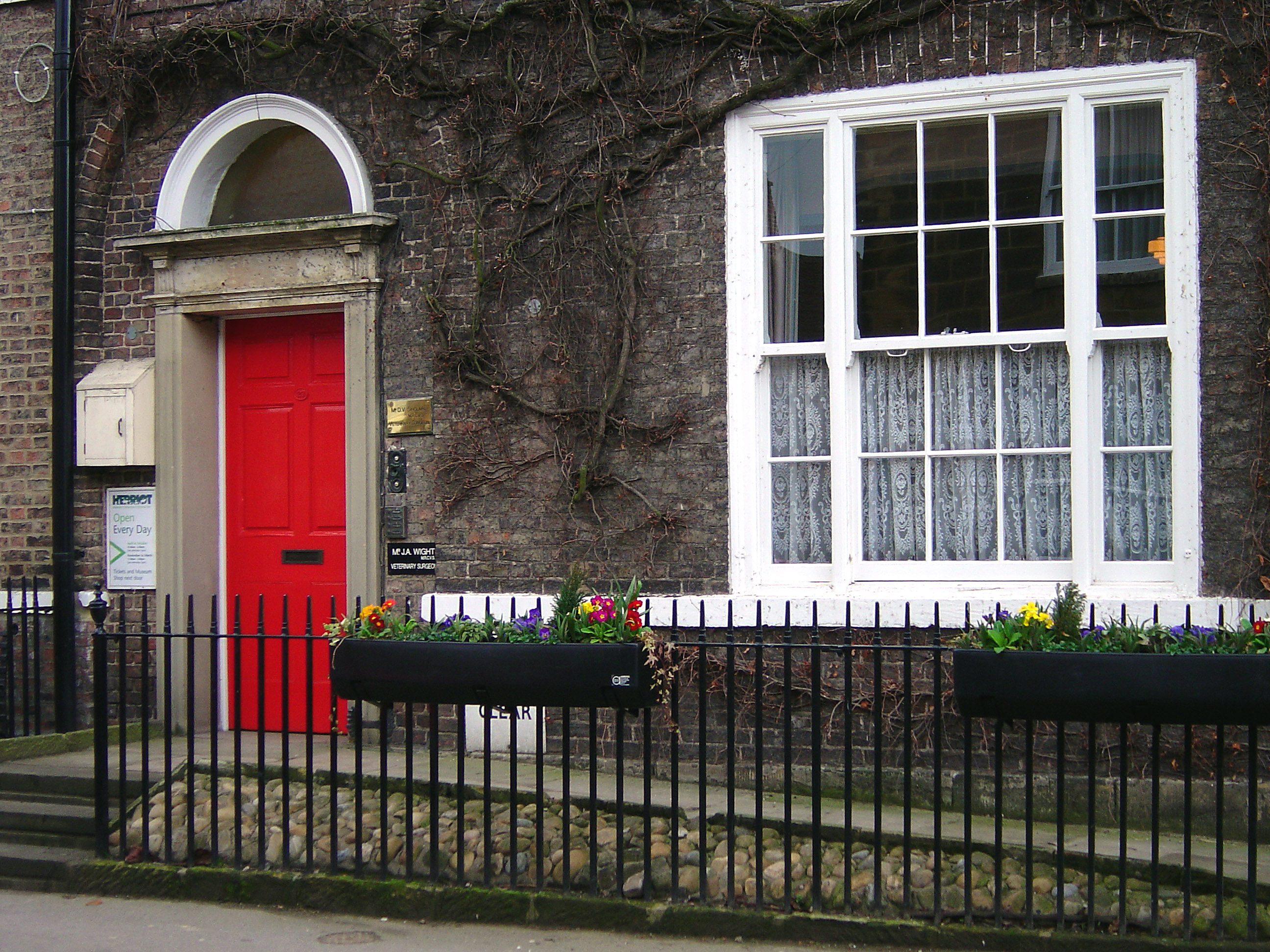
The World of James Herriot

World of James Herriot Ltd is a visitor attraction in the former Thirsk home and veterinary surgery of author James Herriot.

Displays include recreations of James Herriot’s 1940s flat; depictions of rural life and veterinary practice at the time, together with sets and props used for the 1978 BBC All Creatures Great and Small television series based on his books.

== History ==
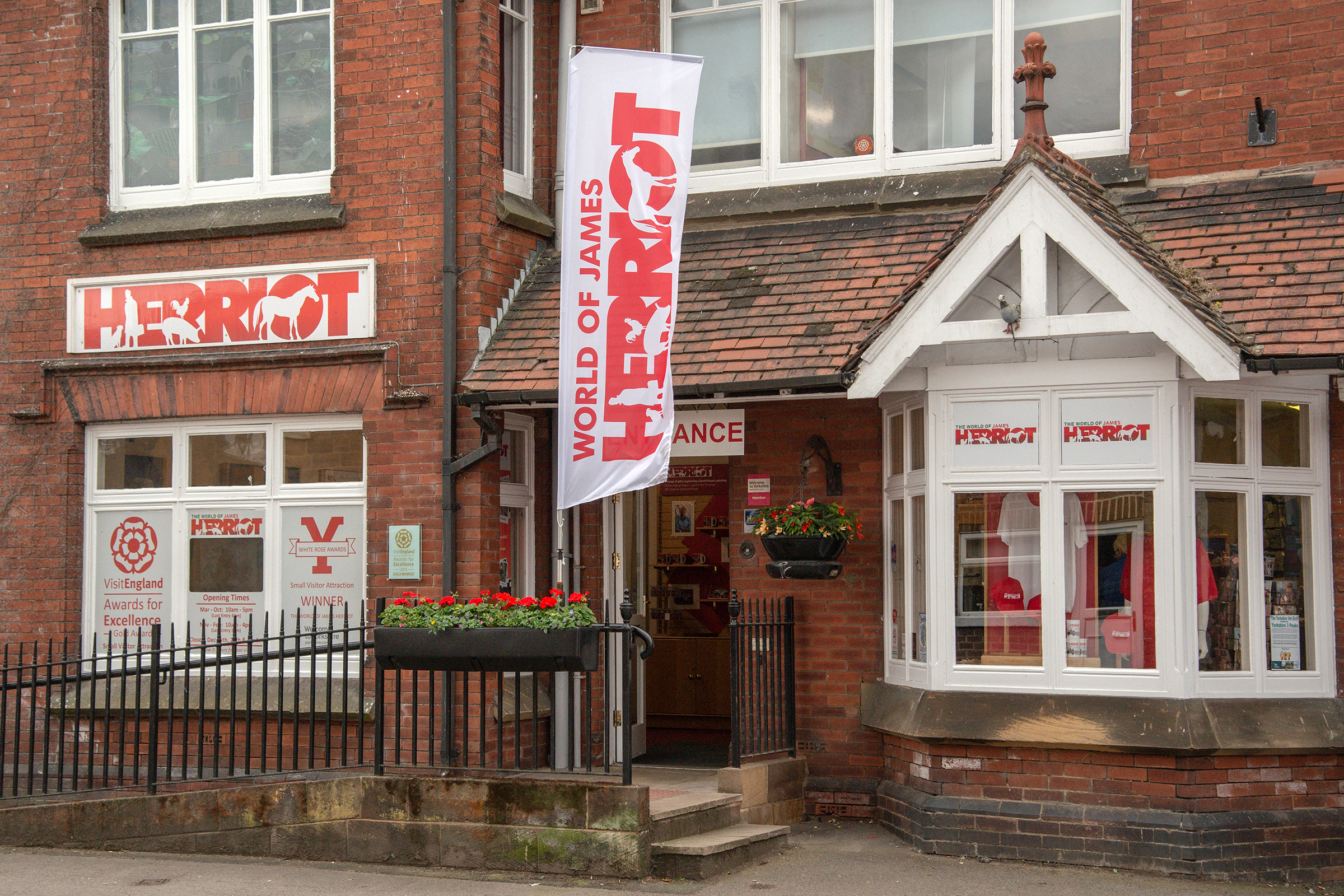
The World of James Herriot, June 2018

In 1995, Hambleton District Council spent £1.4 million purchasing 23 Kirkgate, depicted by James Herriot as Skeldale House, and refurbishing it.

It opened in 1999 but was soon threatened with closure. In 2011, operation transferred to the not-for-profit World of James Herriot Ltd led by Ian Ashton and as of 2022, the directors include James Herriot's real life son and daughter. Hambleton District Council retains ownership of the building.

In 2019, The World of James Herriot received 35,000 visitors and reportedly benefitted from interest in the series The Yorkshire Vet, on Channel 5.

Management closed the attraction to visitors during the COVID-19 pandemic but anticipated boosts from the broadcast of a new All Creatures Great and Small series in the UK in September 2020, and in the US in 2021. By early 2021, VisitBritain was using the phrase "Discover 'All Creatures Great and Small' in Yorkshire".

In 2020, Hambleton District Council granted a subsidised 30-year lease to the operators.

== Gallery ==
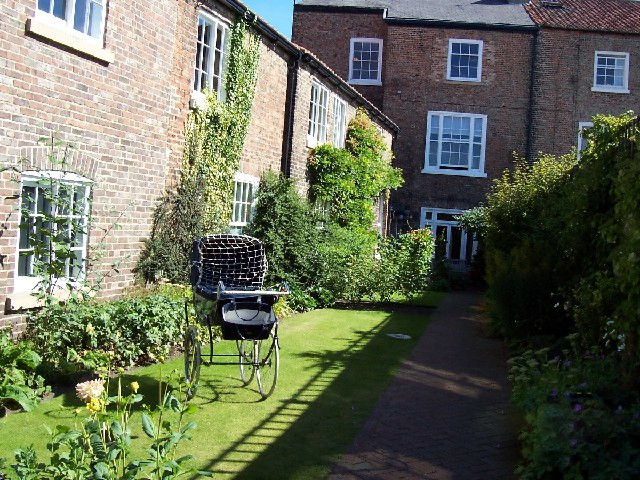
The World of James Herriot

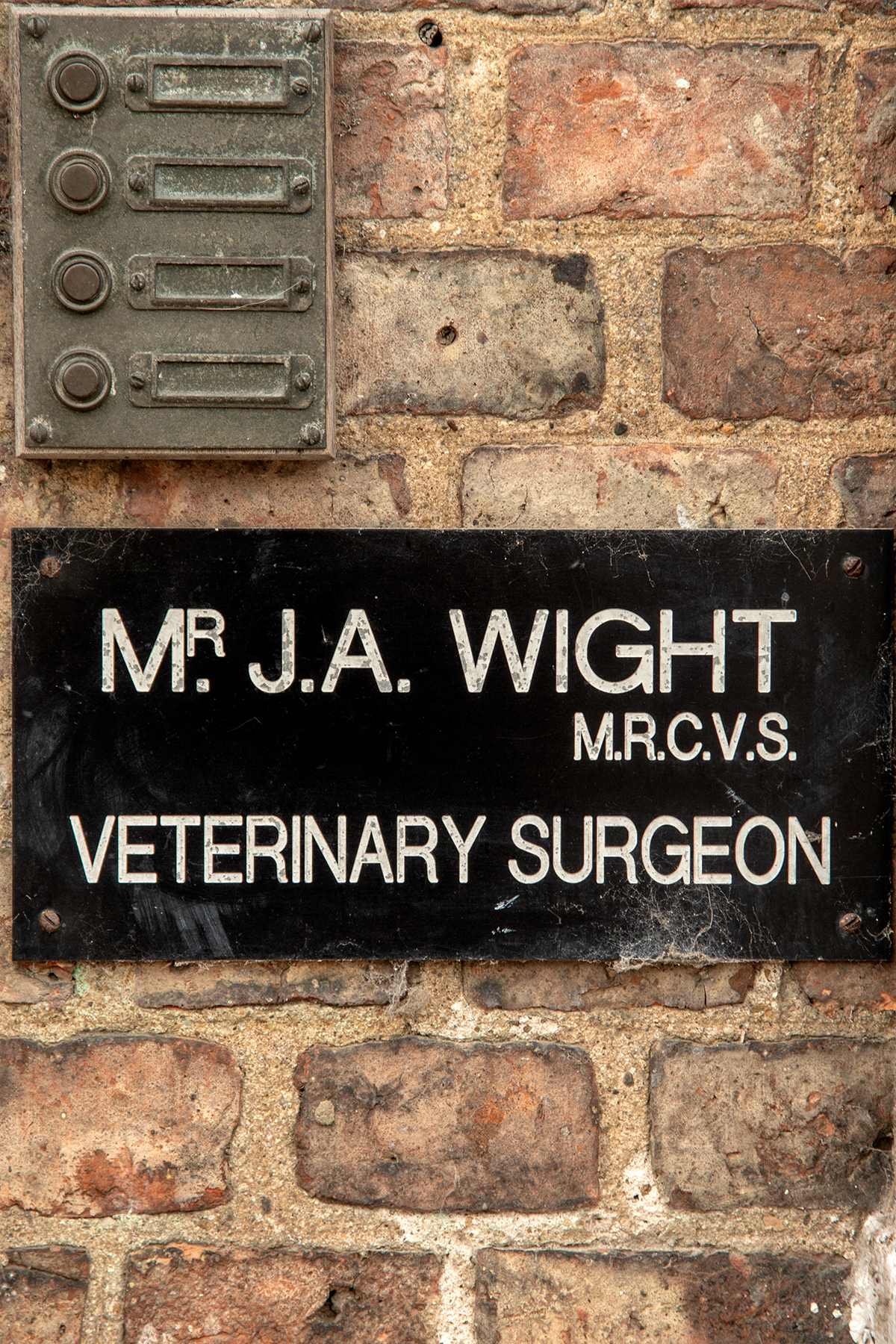
Practice sign at the World of James Herriot

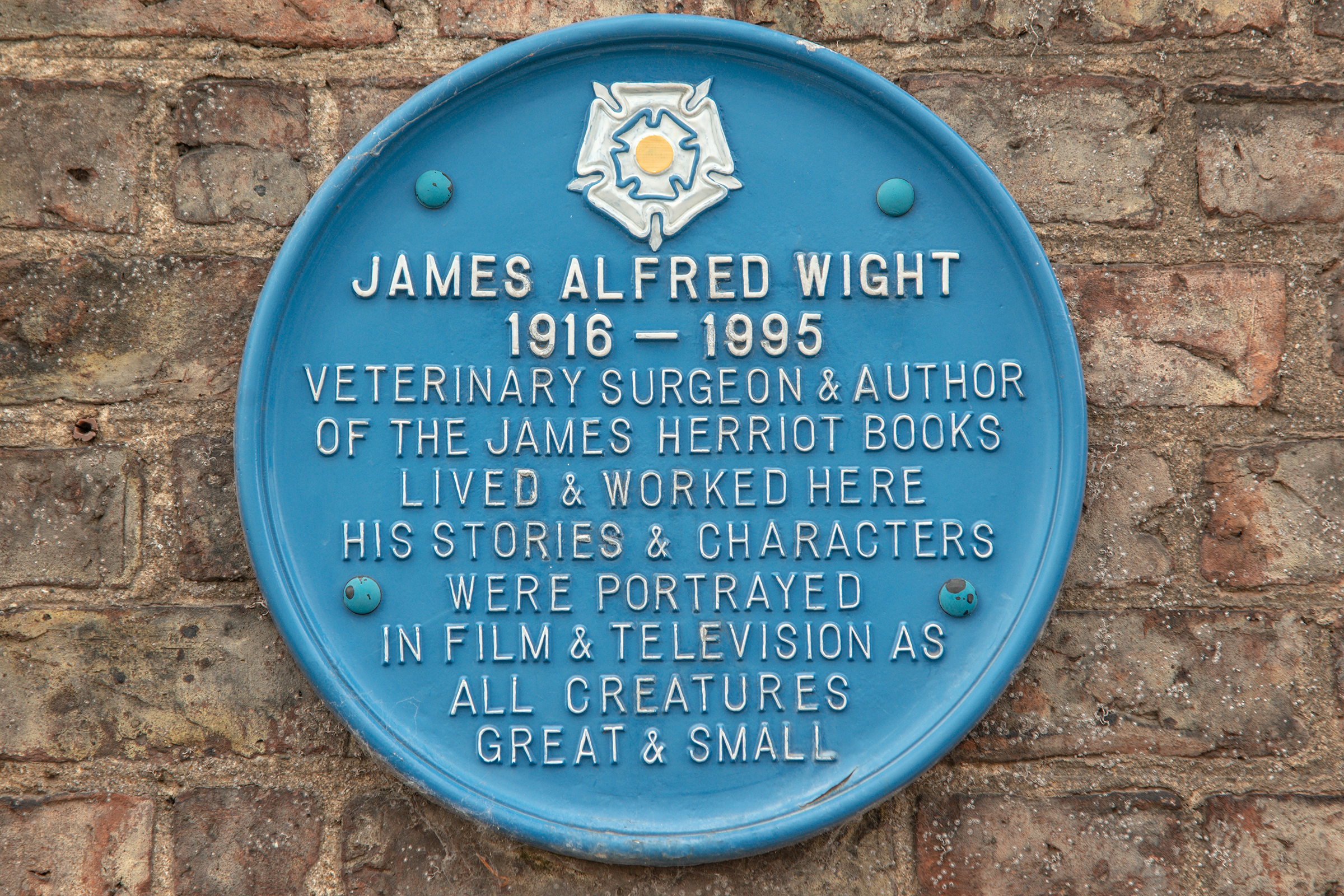
Blue plaque at the World of James Herriot

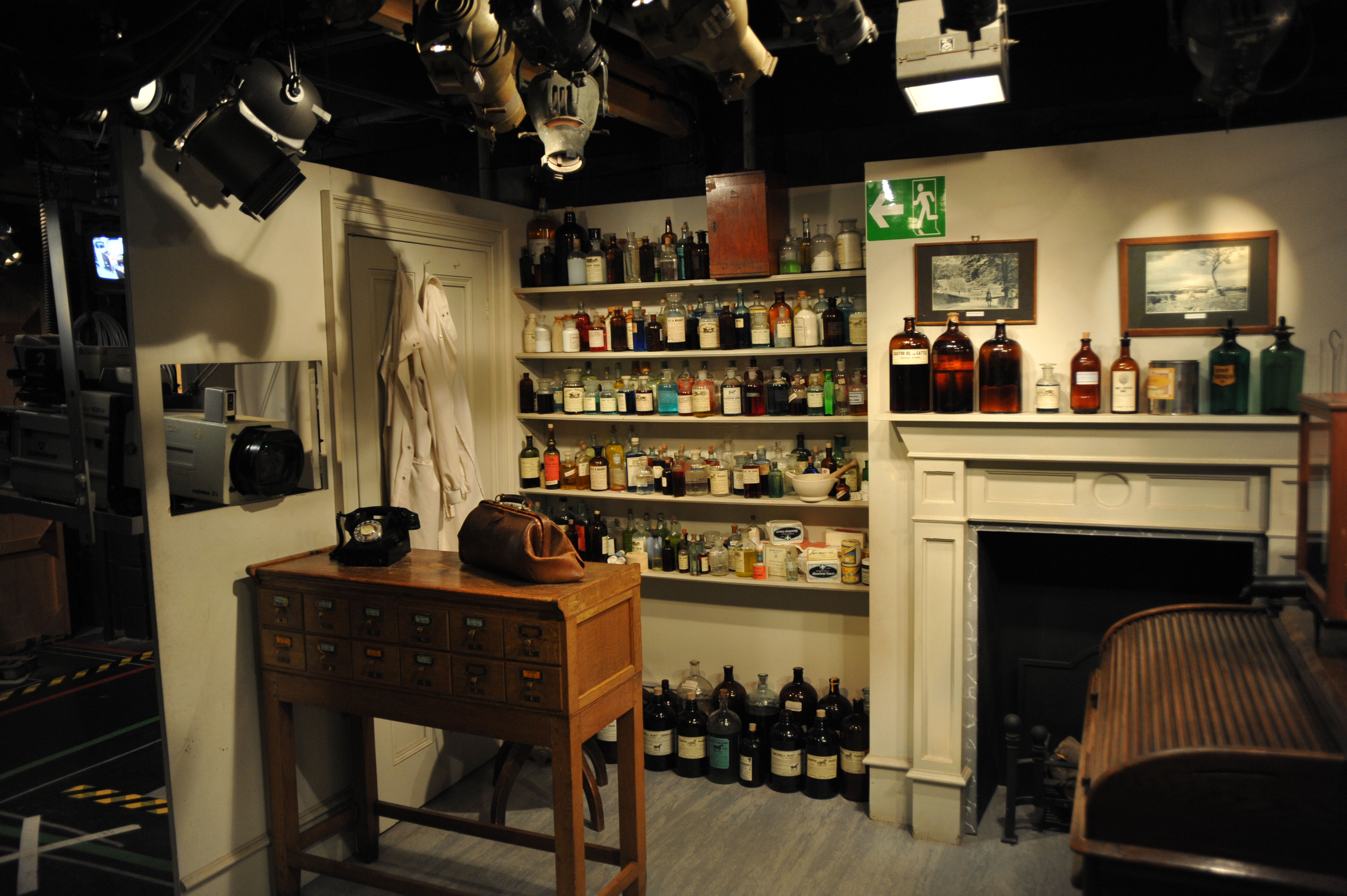
Set for the 1978 BBC All Creatures Great And Small series

== The James Herriot Foundation Trust ==
World of James Herriot established the James Herriot Foundation Trust in 2018 to provide bursary awards for people wishing to become veterinary nurses, with the assistance of sponsors.
