= All Creatures Great and Small (2020 TV series) =

British television series

- Title card
- Genre: Comedy-drama
- Created by: Ben Vanstone
- Based on: If Only They Could Talk by James Herriot
- Starring: Samuel West; Anna Madeley; Nicholas Ralph; Callum Woodhouse; Rachel Shenton; Diana Rigg; Patricia Hodge; James Anthony-Rose
- Composer: Alexandra Harwood
- Country of origin: United Kingdom
- Original language: English
- No. of series: 7
- No. of episodes: 48

Production
- Executive producers: Colin Callender; Melissa Gallant; Hugo Heppell; Rebecca Eaton; Jamie Crichton
- Producer: Richard Burrell
- Production location: United Kingdom
- Running time: 50 minutes
- Production company: Playground Entertainment

Original release
- Network: 5
- Release: 1 September 2020 – present

All Creatures Great and Small is a British television series set in 1930s and 1940s Northern England, based upon a series of books about a Yorkshire veterinary surgeon written by Alf Wight under the pen name of James Herriot. The series, produced by Playground Entertainment for Channel 5, is a new adaptation of Wight's books, following the previous BBC series of 90 episodes that ran from 1978 to 1990 and a number of other films and television series based on Herriot's novels. It was filmed in the Yorkshire Dales, and received funding from Screen Yorkshire.

The first series, which consists of six episodes and a special Christmas episode, was filmed to coincide with the 50th anniversary of the publication of the first book in the James Herriot series. The series premiered in the UK on Channel 5 on 1 September 2020. Following a second series in late 2021, in January 2022 the programme was renewed for two further series, each comprising six episodes and a Christmas special. Filming on the third series began in March 2022. The first episode aired in the UK on 15 September 2022 and in the US on 8 January 2023. The fourth series began airing on 5 October 2023 in the UK and on 7 January 2024 in the US.

In 2024, the series was renewed for a fifth and sixth series, and Callum Woodhouse returned as Tristan Farnon. The fifth series began airing on 19 September 2024 in the UK. In November 2025, it was announced that All Creatures was again renewed for a seventh and eighth series.

== Premise ==
The show revolves around a trio of vets working in the Yorkshire Dales in the late 1930s. Siegfried Farnon (described as an "eccentric") hires James Herriot for his veterinary practice at Skeldale House. In addition to Siegfried and James, there is Siegfried's younger brother, Tristan, and Mrs Hall, their housekeeper.

== Cast ==
- Samuel West as Siegfried Farnon, a veterinary surgeon and owner of Skeldale House
- Anna Madeley as Mrs Audrey Hall, the housekeeper at Skeldale House
- Nicholas Ralph as James Herriot, a veterinary surgeon
- Callum Woodhouse as Tristan Farnon, Siegfried's younger brother (series 1–3, 5–present)
- Rachel Shenton as Helen Alderson (later Helen Herriot), a farmer's daughter; she and James fall in love and eventually marry
- James Anthony-Rose as Richard Carmody, a vet who replaces Tristan when he volunteers for service in the Royal Army Veterinary Corps (series 4–5)

=== Recurring ===
- Diana Rigg (series 1) and Patricia Hodge (series 2–present) as Mrs Pumphrey, the wealthy owner of the Pekingese Tricki Woo
- Matthew Lewis as Hugh Hulton, a wealthy landowner who competes with James for Helen's affections (series 1–2)
- Maimie McCoy as Dorothy, Mrs Hall's friend who has a brief romance with Siegfried (series 1, series 6)
- Mollie Winnard as Maggie, barmaid at the Drovers Arms who has an off-and-on romance with Tristan before marrying another man
- Tony Pitts as Richard Alderson, Helen's father
- Imogen Clawson as Jenny Alderson, Helen's sister, an aspiring nurse
- Gabriel Quigley as Hannah Herriot, James's mother (series 1–3, 5)
- Drew Cain as James Herriot Snr, James's father (series 1–3, 5)
- Dorothy Atkinson as Diana Brompton, a flirtatious divorcée who has a casual romance with Siegfried (series 2)
- Will Thorp as Gerald Hammond, a local man who becomes close to Mrs Hall (series 2–4)
- Sophie Khan Levy as Florence Pandhi (series 3)
- Jeremy Swift as Mr Bosworth (series 5)
- Gaia Wise as Charlotte Beauvoir, Tristan's girlfriend (series 6)

== Production ==
=== Cast and characters ===
Actor Nicholas Ralph did quite a lot of research on James Herriot ("Alf" Wight) who died in 1995. He also met the vet's son and daughter, Jim and Rosie. "They spoke a lot about Donald and Brian, the real Siegfried and Tristan. They said to me that I had the hardest job because Alf is a kind of observer to these bigger, larger-than-life personalities", he recalled. The actor required training in veterinary procedures for authenticity. "Straight off the bat with our on-set vet adviser Andy Barrett, we were up close and personal with horses, sheep, kind of going through the procedures and things that we would be doing. Learning how to approach the animal and everything like that. Using the stethoscope on the cow's heart, then lungs, then stomach" the actor recalled.

Although James Herriot/Alf Wight had a "soft, lilting Scottish accent", according to Christopher Timothy who played Herriot in the original TV adaptation, Timothy was instructed to keep his speech neutral for universality when the original BBC series was being filmed. Nicholas Ralph used his Scottish accent.

The New York Times indicated that Donald Sinclair had more rough edges than Siegfried in the books (and in the TV productions). "Sinclair's real-life behaviour was much more eccentric (he once discharged a shotgun during a dinner party to let his guests know it was time to leave)".

Significant changes were made from the source material (in the previous television series and the memoir), such as Siegfried Farnon being shown as a heartbroken widower and a dramatically increased role for Mrs Hall, who has been reimagined as a young, live-in housekeeper and a "slightly warmer figure" than in the novels. The role of Helen was also greatly expanded.

=== Working with animals ===
For his role as a vet, Ralph required training in veterinary procedures. For some scenes, however, the production used animal prosthetics, such as "the back end of the cow, fully functional and everything". One episode portrayed the birth of a calf; that was filmed separately and "then spliced in seamlessly with footage of the main actors". Ralph admits that "for 90 percent of those scenes with the animals, the animals actually weren't there. It was just cleverly chosen and prosthetics and extremely well-trained, happy animals when we did see them".

Some of Ralph's work involved interaction with live animals, such as a bull in one episode and a horse rearing and kicking in another. "Straight off the bat with our on-set vet adviser Andy Barrett, we were up close and personal with horses, sheep, kind of going through the procedures and things that we would be doing", Ralph said. "Learning how to approach the animal and everything like that. Using the stethoscope on the cow's heart, then lungs, then stomach..." "I have huge respect for ... Andy Barrett and the animal handlers who worked on the show", Ralph told an interviewer.

In interviews after the filming of series three, Ralph said that the crew had experienced problems with getting cooperation from cats: one bolted off the set while he was trying to examine it. "They are impossible to train!", according to the actor. He was already confident and comfortable working with large animals but spoke of an incident when a cow went out of control after a scene was filmed: "The handlers were holding on to it and had to like roll out of the way as the cow basically galloped, so he had to hit the deck and rolled very professionally out of the way".

=== First series ===
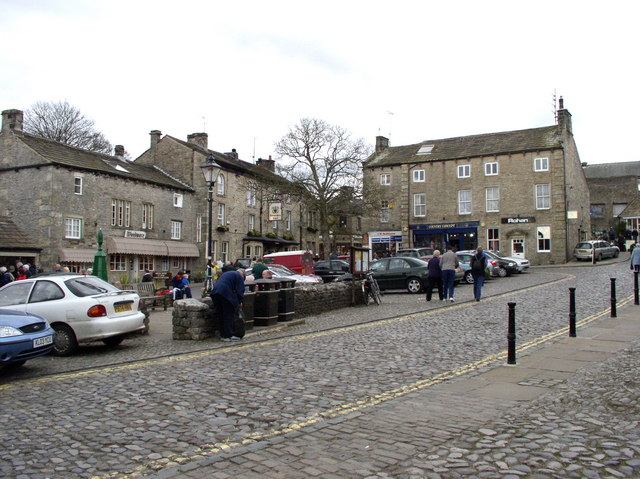
The Square, Grassington

The first series was filmed largely in the Yorkshire Dales (often around Nidderdale); the village of Grassington in Upper Wharfedale was used for the fictional village of Darrowby. The BBC series, which was broadcast between 1978 and 1990, had been filmed in the northern part of the Dales (Wensleydale and Swaledale), with the village Askrigg used for the fictional Darrowby.

When discussing the new series, actor Rachel Shenton was enthusiastic about the locations: "We ... shot in and around the Dales", she said. "The Dales are miles and miles of beautiful, undulating countryside and it really is breathtaking". Neither the BBC series nor the 2020 PBS series was filmed in Thirsk (where the actual vet, Alf Wight, practised), because it had become too large for the small-town feel that the producers wanted. "The nice thing was that there weren't any modern houses in the town centre ... so we didn't have to change anything completely. What we did change were all the shop signs and the usual things like aerials, satellite dishes, alarm boxes...".

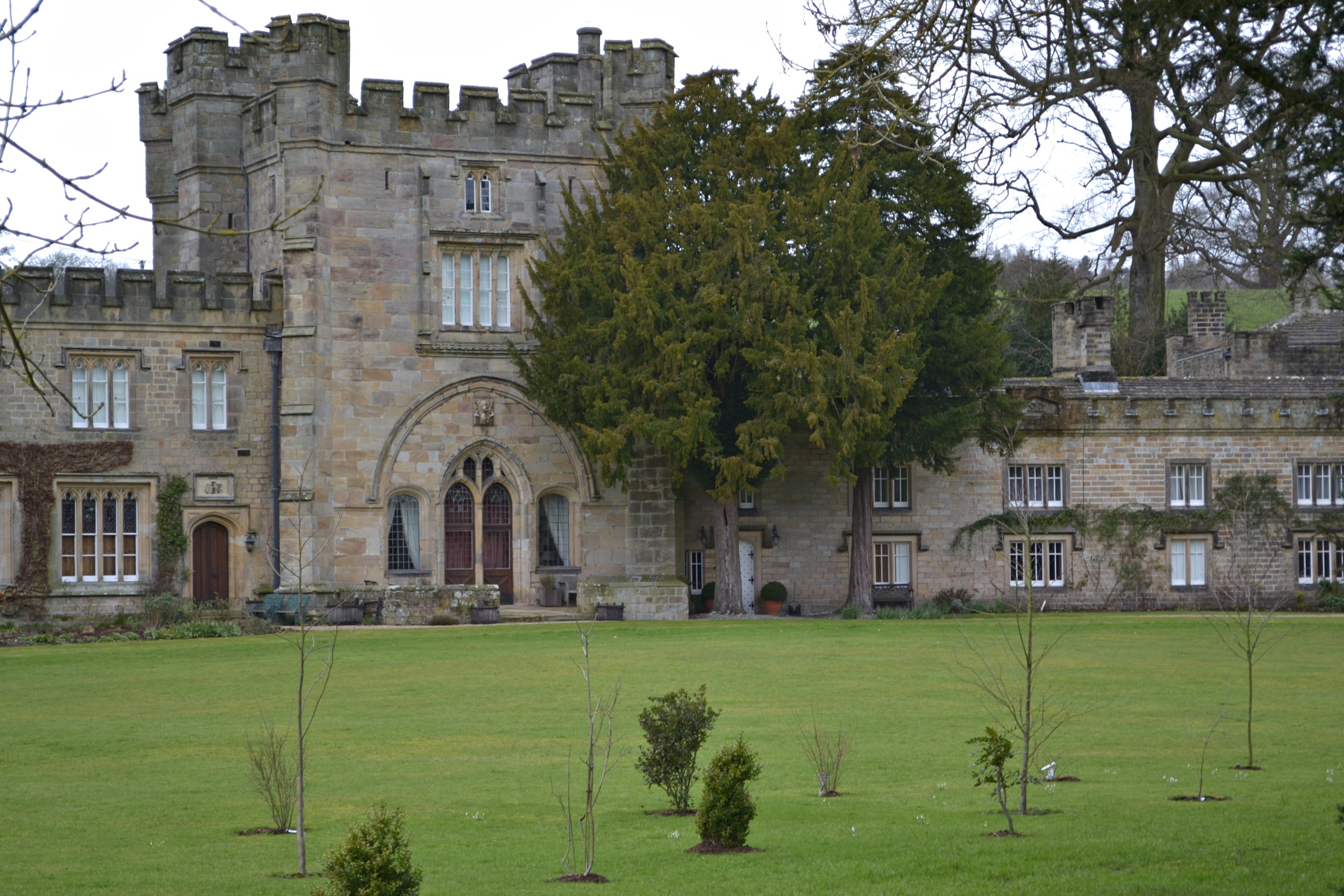
Bolton Hall at Bolton Abbey Estates

In Grassington, the Devonshire Inn was rebranded as the Drovers Arms, while the pub interiors were shot at The Green Dragon Inn at Hardraw. The village bakery, Walker's, was used for the Darrowby Cycles property; a private residence was used for the exterior of Skeldale House. The Stripey Badger book store became the greengrocers G F Endleby, the shoe store Helen Midgley was used for Handleys Booksellers and the Rustic Rabbit gift store became Higgins Bakers.

The home of Mrs Pumphrey, the owner of Tricki-Woo, was filmed at Broughton Hall in Broughton, Craven; the character was based on Marjorie Warner, a client of Alf Wight, who lived at Thorpe House near Thirsk. Many of the scenes for the series were filmed in a studio. Parts of the first episode (with the waterfall and pool) were filmed at Janet's Foss near Malham. Other locations included the Barden Bridge at the Bolton Abbey Estate and the Ripon Racecourse. The church featured in the Christmas special is St Wilfrid's at Burnsall, near Grassington, the crossroads are "on the roads above Pateley Bridge" in Nidderdale and the farm is in Airton.

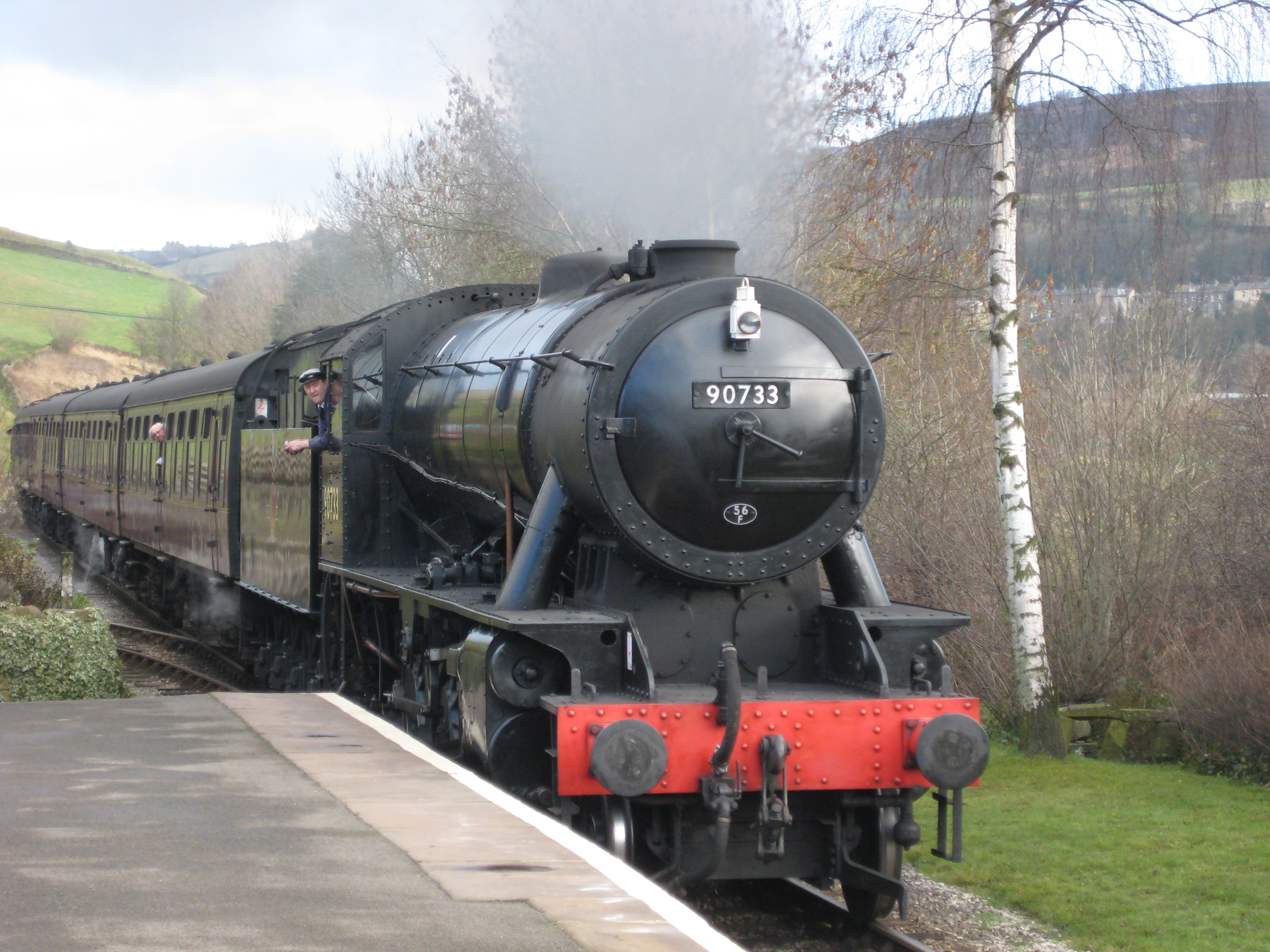
Keighley & Worth Valley Railway train at Oakworth Station

The steam train in the first series was filmed on the Keighley & Worth Valley Railway line; Keighley Station stands in for a Glasgow station in the first episode, and Oakworth railway station appears in both the first and second episodes.

The six episodes and the Christmas special were filmed from 2019 into early 2020. Much of the outdoor work was completed "during winter and autumn, and it was freezing, with long, cold, dark days and rainy days", according to Ralph.

=== Second series ===
Pre-production work had begun on the second set of episodes by early 2021. The production company made appeals for historic artefacts and props, as they prepared to film the next chapters of James Herriot's life. Due to lockdown restrictions, they were struggling to find everything from homeware to farming implements made before 1938. They planned to buy as many artefacts and props as they could because they expected to film several series.

Executive producer Colin Callender said in early 2021 that filming had been postponed due to restrictions necessitated by the COVID-19 pandemic. "We are using this time to commission Ben Vanstone [the writer] and the writing team to work on season two ... we're able to use this lockdown period to work on the development and script development". In February 2021, Vanstone said that most scripts had been written; he expected filming to start in late March (if the restrictions allowed). The writer hinted that the relationship between James and Helen would be developed; "we want to explore why they're together and why they work with one another". In the relationship between Tristan and Siegfried, the latter will be "desperate to move forward in his relationship with his brother". Siegfried's relationship with Dorothy would continue, but "there are still plenty of opportunities for him to mess things up", Vanstone commented.

In early 2021, Ralph told PBS that he expected to see all of the principal actors when filming started, saying "The cast will be back of course ... and I've heard a lot of the crew are coming back as well". West added that director Brian Percival would also be returning.

Actor Diana Rigg died after the first series had been completed. Callender said that the producers were uncertain as to "what we will do with the character of Mrs Pumphrey" (The Mrs Pumphrey character was based on a client of Wight's, Marjorie Warner, who owned a Pekingese named Bambi). In April 2021, an announcement stated that Patricia Hodge had been cast in the role. Other new cast members include Dorothy Atkinson as Diana Brompton, a possible love interest for Siegfried, and James Fleet as Colonel Hubert Merrick, a farmer who appeared in the Herriot book.

Filming began in March 2021 for the second series of six episodes and a Christmas special. Scheduled locations included the Bradford area (initially in Little Germany, Bradford, standing in for Glasgow), Kettlewell and Grassington (for the fictional village of Darrowby) as well as the Yorkshire Dales.

=== Third series ===
In January 2022, the show was renewed for a further two series. Filming on Series three took place in locations including Arncliffe, North Yorkshire, Grassington, Harrogate, Summerbridge, North Yorkshire and Pateley Bridge.

This series is set in spring 1939 and includes some changes. Tristan is finally fully qualified, James starts a new phase of life after marrying Helen and becomes a partner in the business; the practice gets involved in the new bovine tuberculosis testing programme. By then, World War II is on the horizon and people are being encouraged to enlist. Veterinary surgeons work in a "protected profession", so are not required to serve, but in the final episode James decides to enlist.

=== Fourth series ===
Set in 1940 during World War II, this series consists of six episodes plus a Christmas special. The Tristan Farnon character was not expected to appear because he is said to have enlisted in the Royal Army Veterinary Corps. One source added this information: "It was also announced that Woodhouse will be starring in horror film One of Us, the timing of which conflicted with ACGAS". Student vet Richard Carmody (James Anthony-Rose) joined the regular cast.

Filming commenced on 3 March 2023 and reports in April indicated that the cast and crew had been seen in Grassington and in the North Yorkshire town of Thirsk.

Advance information from the producers included this commentary:

Picking up in springtime of 1940 with change on the horizon for everyone in Skeldale House. James and Helen wonder when the right time might be to start a family, not knowing whether or not James will be called up to serve in the RAF. Tristan's absence is felt by all, but no one more than Siegfried who attempts to hold the growing household, and himself, together as he braves this new world. Mrs Hall and Helen's friendship blossoms as they look to the future and new trainee veterinary student Richard Carmody arrives, causing complications in the house.

=== Fifth series ===
This series picks up during World War II and shows more of James's time in the RAF as well as the trials and tribulations he and Helen encounter bringing up their baby boy. Principal filming is on location in Grassington.

RAF scenes were filmed at the Lincolnshire Aviation Heritage Centre museum in East Kirkby. The entire ensemble cast, including the newest regulars James Anthony-Rose and Callum Woodhouse who did not appear in the last series, as well as the show's stars Nicholas Ralph and Rachel Shenton reprise their roles.

=== Sixth series ===
Series six resumes in 1945 with the war coming to an end and life returning to normal. New characters include Gaia Wise as posh horse-lover Charlotte Beauvoir, and Jonathan Hyde as her father, General Beauvoir.

== Episodes ==
Series	Episodes	Originally released		Average viewership (in millions)
Series	Episodes	First released	Last released	Average viewership (in millions)
1	6	1 September 2020	6 October 2020	5.10
Special		22 December 2020		4.99
2	6	16 September 2021	21 October 2021	4.62
Special		24 December 2021		4.75
3	6	15 September 2022	20 October 2022	3.76
Special		23 December 2022		3.86
4	6	5 October 2023	9 November 2023	3.73
Special		21 December 2023		3.71
5	6	19 September 2024	24 October 2024	3.34
Special		23 December 2024		3.37
6	6	25 September 2025	30 October 2025	2.90
Special		24 December 2025		3.08
7	6	17 September 2026	22 October 2026	TBA

=== Series 1 (2020) ===
No. overall	No. in series	Title	Directed by	Written by	Original release date	UK viewers (millions)
1	1	"You've Got to Dream"	Brian Percival	Ben Vanstone	1 September 2020	5.49 (Note: An additional 1.20m for the Sunday repeat contributed to a total of 6.69m.)
1937: Newly qualified veterinary surgeon James Herriot travels from his home in Glasgow to the Yorkshire village of Darrowby for a job interview at Siegfried Farnon's practice. Siegfried takes James to his first job treating an abscess in a gelding's hoof. James meets Helen Alderson while treating an injured calf and she urges him to stand up to Siegfried, who will respect him. The locals get James drunk and he mixes up a pair of cats while trying to feed them, resulting in Siegfried almost neutering the wrong one. James manages to prove himself after saving the lives of a cow and her calf, leading Siegfried to offer him a permanent job as his assistant.
2	2	"Another Farnon?"	Brian Percival	Ben Vanstone	8 September 2020	5.03 (Note: An additional 1.07m for the Sunday repeat contributed to a total of 6.10m.)
James collects Siegfried's younger brother Tristan from the station and they accidentally crash Siegfried's car. Tristan announces he has graduated from Edinburgh veterinary college and joins the practice. James takes him on his rounds, and has trouble dealing with a cow suffering with milk fever. He fares better with Mrs Pumphrey and her Pekingese dog Tricki Woo, which leads her to invite him to a party, where he meets Helen's fiancé Hugh Hulton. While James and Siegfried are at Mrs Pumphrey's dance party, Mrs Hall plays a pencil-dice game of cricket with Tristan, and works out that Tristan has not been honest about his graduation. Technically, he did pass his last exam, but failed two others.
3	3	"Andante"	Metin Hüseyin	Lisa Holdsworth	15 September 2020	5.22 (Note: An additional 0.82m (excluding device viewership) for the Sunday repeat in seven-day viewership contributed to a total of at least 6.03m.)
Siegfried's application for the post of racecourse vet is jeopardised after Hugh—the owner of the surefire race winner and pride of the village Andante—disputes James's rationale for putting it down. Tristan revels in his new job collecting debts from clients, until he ends up frittering it all away in the pub—but then uses his insider knowledge to his advantage in betting on the second favourite to win it back. Mrs Hall tries to help Helen encourage her younger sister to realise that there is more to life than farming.
4	4	"A Tricki Case"	Andy Hay	Freddy Syborn	22 September 2020	4.81 (Note: An additional 1.36m for the Sunday repeat contributed to a total of 6.17m.)
Alongside developing his relationship with Helen, James is enlisted to help Mrs Pumphrey's dog Tricki back to a healthy weight. Tristan, however, takes up the responsibility, determined to earn his keep so that Siegfried will fund his forthcoming return to veterinary studies. In so doing, he is not helped by the dog's indulging in the expensive foodstuffs given to the practice by Mrs Pumphrey to tide the dog over while he is away from home. Mrs Hall is troubled by the lack of correspondence from her son, while the Farnons pass the buck to each other in examining a rather ferocious dog.
5	5	"All's Fair"	Metin Hüseyin	Debbie O'Malley	29 September 2020	4.87 (Note: An additional 0.91m (excluding device viewership) for the Sunday repeat in seven-day viewership contributed to a total of at least 5.78m.)
On the day of the Darrowby Fair, James agrees to act as attending vet, judging the livestock and pet competitions, unaware that it is a taxing and unrewarding assignment. Siegfried, Tristan, and Mrs Hall all place bets on when James will resign in exasperation. James experiences pressure from nearly every competitor, and from Helen, anxious for a favourable assessment of her prize bull in hope of securing a profitable sale. Siegfried meets an attractive and unattached friend of Mrs Hall, Dorothy, but despite their mutual attraction, Siegfried still mourns for his deceased wife.
6	6	"A Cure for All Ills"	Andy Hay	Julian Jones and Ben Vanstone	6 October 2020	5.17 (Note: An additional 1.23m for the Sunday repeat contributed to a total of 6.40m.)
James feels guilt over the cow a farmer purchased based on his recommendation, which is now morbidly ill with an abscess which he feels powerless to cure. Tristan becomes a zealous advocate for a risky procedure for the cow, which Siegfried, as head of the practice, strictly forbids. Tristan manages an overwhelmed surgery as best he can, while Siegfried is taken ill with flu. At James's surprise birthday party, Maggie, the barmaid, breaks off her tenuous relationship with Tristan, citing his lack of seriousness. Encouraged by Helen, James performs surgery on the cow, assisted by Tristan, which Siegfried reluctantly agrees with after initially attempting to stop it. The operation is a success. Later, at the Drover's Arms, Siegfried promotes James to Senior Vet.

=== Christmas special (2020) ===
No. overall	No. in series	Title	Directed by	Written by	Original release date	UK viewers (millions)
7	7	"The Night Before Christmas"	Andy Hay	Ben Vanstone	22 December 2020	4.99 (Note: An additional 1.33m watched the narrative repeat on Boxing Day (Saturday 26 December), contributing to a total of 6.32m.)
At Siegfried's Christmas Eve party for the villagers, Helen grows weary of people talking to her about her pending marriage, so she joins James on an emergency call to the Chapmans' remote farm, where a dog is having a difficult labour. The two bond over the frailty of one of the puppies before fog traps them at the farm overnight; they struggle to contain their attraction to each other, and Helen ponders whether marrying Hugh is what she really wants. Siegfried seeks lessons in courtship from Tristan in an effort to spend some meaningful time with Dorothy. Mrs Hall is tense with excitement over her estranged son's Christmas visit. Tristan helps Maggie's shy little brother with an ill donkey, and in return gets an early Christmas present under the mistletoe from his former girlfriend. On Christmas morning, Helen calls off her wedding to Hugh.

=== Series 2 (2021) ===
No. overall	No. in series	Title	Directed by	Written by	Original release date	UK viewers (millions)
8	1	"Where the Heart Is"	Brian Percival	Ben Vanstone	16 September 2021	4.33 (Note: An additional 0.90m for the Saturday repeat contributed to a total of at least 5.23m.)
Spring 1938: A brief return home to Glasgow sees James offered a permanent role at a local veterinary practice, and he has to choose between his mother's wishes for him to be closer to home and the place in Yorkshire he has come to love. His view of Yorkshire is later sullied after a clash with rural values when he resists the Aldersons' wishes to put down their dog, which has been terrorising local sheep. Siegfried struggles to keep concealing how Tristan did not do as well in his studies as he has led everyone to believe, especially when Tristan accidentally kills his first patient.
9	2	"Semper Progrediens"	Brian Percival	Ben Vanstone	23 September 2021	4.24 (Note: An additional 0.87m for the Sunday repeat contributed to a total of at least 5.11m.)
The time of the Daffodil Ball has arrived, and each member of the practice is caught between their duties to their patients and their potential dates. Now in receipt of a formal offer from the Glasgow practice, James realises the only thing keeping him in Yorkshire is a possible future relationship with Helen, but goes too far in trying to respect her hesitancy at the dance. Tristan makes Siegfried realise he is getting too diffident, and Siegfried becomes determined to prove himself in front of his date Diana Brompton and a demanding client. Mrs Hall becomes enamoured with a new client.
10	3	"We Can But Hope"	Sasha Ransome	Chloë Mi Lin Ewart	30 September 2021	4.95 (Note: An additional 0.53m for the Sunday repeat in seven-day consolidation (excluding device viewership) contributed to a total of at least 5.49m.)
The fate of a struggling young widow causes difficulties for James and Helen's burgeoning romance. Meanwhile, Siegfried has another scheme, involving chickens, to whip Tristan into shape. A visit from Tricki Woo creates mayhem in Skeldale House.
11	4	"Many Happy Returns"	Sasha Ransome	Debbie O'Malley	7 October 2021	4.73 (Note: An additional 0.50m for the Sunday repeat in seven-day consolidation (excluding device viewership) contributed to a total of at least 5.24m.)
Tristan is not best pleased with Siegfried's present to him on his birthday - he is going to be relied upon more to work in the practice.
12	5	"The Last Man In"	Andy Hay	Debbie O'Malley	14 October 2021	4.69 (Note: No narrative repeats were shown for these episodes.)
The town converges on Mrs Pumphrey's estate for the annual cricket match, and the stakes are set higher than anticipated when James discovers his team will be playing against that captained by Helen's former fiancé, Hugh.
13	6	"Home Truths"	Andy Hay	Ben Vanstone	21 October 2021	4.80
James proposes to Helen, who accepts. He later asks permission from Helen's father, who gives James his wife's engagement ring to give to Helen. James's parents visit from Scotland, expecting him to be leaving for a job there. James apologises for not telling them sooner, but he wants to stay where he is, and announces that Helen is his fiancee. Tristan helps out a heartbroken woman, who lost her dog after it was hit by a car.

=== Christmas special (2021) ===
No. overall	No. in series	Title	Directed by	Written by	Original release date	UK viewers (millions)
14	-	"The Perfect Christmas"	Andy Hay	Ben Vanstone	24 December 2021	4.75 (Note: An additional 0.66m watched the narrative repeat on 30 December (excluding device viewership) in 7-day viewership, contributing to a total of at least 5.41m.)
On Christmas Eve, James and Helen find themselves expected at two Christmas lunches the next day. Siegfried throws his annual Christmas Eve party for the villagers. Tricki Woo, Mrs Pumphrey's Pekingese dog, has fallen seriously ill with gastro-enteritis, with James, Tristan and Siegfried all trying to save him. James suggests giving the same anaesthetic shot to Tricki Woo that earlier saved Mr Kitson's apparently dying ewe, and this ultimately also works for Tricki Woo. Everyone changes their plans for Christmas lunch to make sure that Mrs Pumphrey is not spending her day alone. Tristan passes his final exam, so he can now be a fully-fledged vet. However, he also discovers that Maggie has become engaged to another man.

=== Series 3 (2022) ===
No. overall	No. in series	Title	Directed by	Written by	Original release date	UK viewers (millions)
15	1	"Second Time Lucky"	Brian Percival	Ben Vanstone	15 September 2022	3.93
It is spring 1939. Tristan is now a qualified vet and can take on more work at the practice, although he is not always ready to do so. James and Helen start to realise that when married they will need to adjust to each other's priorities. At James's stag night he ends up drunk and sleeps in the barn at a farm, where next morning, his wedding day, he finds himself testing a whole herd of cows for TB. Tristan and Siegfried lose the wedding ring, but everyone manages to get to the wedding in time. James and Helen depart for their honeymoon, after Siegfried makes James a partner in the practice. The signs of war grow as recruiting for the armed forces starts locally.
16	2	"Honeymoon's Over"	Andy Hay	Chloe Mi Lin Ewart	22 September 2022	3.76
Helen and James begin married life in the bedsit in the Skeldale House attic, but although happy together they have to contend with Siegfried's reluctance to hand over any real responsibility to James despite the new partnership, or divide earnings fairly. Helen offers to help with the chaotic practice accounts when she is not working at the Alderson farm, but Siegfried undermines this. There are arguments over the practice becoming involved in TB testing. Tristan saves the life of a dog and finds himself in closer contact with its owner, Florence Pandhi, daughter of a rival vet. Siegfried and James together work out what is causing calves at a local farm to start dying, and are reconciled. Local men start to join the armed forces.
17	3	"Surviving Siegfried"	Brian Percival	Ben Vanstone	29 September 2022	3.70
James still feels exploited in the division of work as Tristan claims to be fully occupied with small animal work. Siegfried starts to spend a lot of time trying to save a racehorse which has become terrified of being ridden and may be put down. The problems he encounters bring back the traumas he went through as a horse vet in World War I. Helen and James become embroiled in disputes with farmers about TB testing. Tristan is made to tidy up the dispensary, but a salesman talks him into buying useless sedatives. Later, Tristan is attacked by a cat whose owner is reluctant to pay for it to be spayed. Siegfried struggles to cope with bad news, but persists with his efforts to save the racehorse.
18	4	"What a Balls Up!"	Andy Hay	Chloe Mi Lin Ewart	6 October 2022	3.80
As signs of possible war increase in Darrowby, Tristan buys a car, which is so noisy it frightens Tricki-Woo, who is staying at Skeldale House, and annoys Siegfried. Tristan claims it will help him deal with more farm work. James is in hot water with the Ministry over the TB testing scheme, and Helen starts to help put things in better order. Mrs Hall finds herself invited out, and Tristan also asks someone on a date. However, neither occasion goes as planned.
19	5	"Edward"	Andy Hay	Karim Khan	13 October 2022	3.86
Mrs Hall goes out for the day to see someone important, and Tristan is put in charge of domestic duties at Skeldale House. He finds himself witnessing the way Siegfried deals with a schoolboy sent for a work experience day. At Keighley, Mrs Hall finds talking heavy-going initially, while Helen discovers at her family's farm that Jenny has left school because she prefers to work on the farm. At the end of the day, tensions rise in Skeldale House for a number of those living there.
20	6	"For Whom the Bell Tolls"	Stewart Svaasand	Jamie Crichton	20 October 2022	3.71
It is September 1939 and the signs of war are all around Darrowby, including the first evacuated children. Helen and James face a moral dilemma over TB testing, which could have serious repercussions for their future. A dog abandoned outside the practice presents Siegfried with a dilemma. Meanwhile Tristan makes a bold move. Mrs Pumphrey repurposes her home as a war garden and sanctuary. Siegfried and Tristan argue again, and Helen goes to bat to save James at the Ministry. War is declared, and the future of several of the characters hangs in the balance.

=== Christmas special (2022) ===
No. overall	No. in series	Title	Directed by	Written by	Original release date	UK viewers (millions)
21	-	"Merry Bloody Christmas"	Stewart Svaasand	Ben Vanstone	23 December 2022	3.86
Darrowby tries to enjoy Christmas 1939 despite the start of the war. Tristan is bored by lack of small-animal work, but Siegfried finds himself conflicted between the health of a horse and the possibility of keeping Tristan from being called up. Mrs Hall hears news from Gerald which upsets her. Tricki-Woo finds himself in the shadow of a kitten, and the Skeldale household is enlivened by the arrival of a young Jewish evacuee girl.

=== Series 4 (2023) ===
No. overall	No. in series	Title	Directed by	Written by	Original release date	UK viewers (millions)
22	1	"Broodiness"	Andy Hay	Jamie Crichton	5 October 2023	3.73
Spring 1940, and the veterinary practice is busy, with Tristan now in the Army. Helen tries to help with administration but makes an embarrassing mistake. James is attacked by a boy when he tries to see to his sick dog. Mrs Hall decides that she needs to make changes in her personal life but finds facing the past difficult. Siegfried makes a blunder when talking to a widowed farmer. Helen starts to think about children. James has to admit that he had misjudged the owner of the unwell dog and is able to provide the boy with a useful role, in addition to giving the dog a better chance to get well.
23	2	"Carpe Diem"	Andy Hay	Helen Raynor	12 October 2023	3.63
To bring order to the administrative chaos of the veterinary practice, Siegfried impulsively employs Miss Harbottle as a bookkeeper. Later he has to give a farmer bad news about a favourite cow. Helen and James meet a ferret in the pub, and Mrs Hall has a trip to the cinema with Gerald. The changes introduced by Miss Harbottle begin to grate on clients and Siegfried, as well as the others at Skeldale House. Siegfried has a bright idea to save the cow from going for slaughter. When Miss Harbottle expresses outrage at an attempt to avoid her new rules, Siegfried finally tells her to leave, although she insists she has resigned. James and Helen decide that, after all, now is the right time to start a family.
24	3	"Right Hand Man"	Stewart Svaasand	Maxine Alderton	19 October 2023	3.72
Veterinary student Richard Carmody is recruited to assist James, but an impressed Siegfried monopolises his time. Carmody's lack of practical experience also shows itself during visits to farms. Helen and James try to get time to themselves, which proves difficult. Mrs Pumphrey holds a tea party to encourage contact between the community and the Army training camp. An incident at the party helps Helen solve a mystery surrounding the behaviour of a dog Mrs Pumphrey is looking after. Mrs Hall and Gerald have a heart to heart. All three vets find themselves attending a dangerously injured horse.
25	4	"By the Book"	Stewart Svaasand	Maxine Alderton	26 October 2023	3.77
Carmody finds his manner with clients being criticised, and his books are confiscated while he undergoes training. Potential tragedy strikes a new farmer and his family, but its impact is reduced when the community rallies round. Carmody's discussion of new research into a possible link between Brucellosis - the disease affecting the farmer's herd - and the loss of unborn babies puts Helen and James in a desperately tense situation. Carmody improves his customer care approach when he tackles a lethargic animal and its owner but suffers irritating consequences.
26	5	"Papers"	Jordan Hogg	Jamie Crichton	2 November 2023	3.78
Carmody starts driving lessons, but they do not go well. He is in further trouble when Mrs Pumphrey refuses to accept that he can be a substitute for Tricki-Woo's 'Uncle Herriot', who has now been called up. Mrs Hall gets bad news. James and Helen's plans for a farewell picnic in the country are disrupted by an injured cat. However, Carmody gets help with his driving from an unexpected source, and the picnic does get consumed, albeit not outdoors. Mrs Hall takes a momentous decision. James and Siegfried reminisce about the former's rough start at the practice and how far he has come since. As James departs, Carmody is asked by Siegfried to extend his stay.
27	6	"The Home Front"	Stewart Svaasand	Jamie Crichton	9 November 2023	3.77
Helen feels unsettled at Skeldale House in the absence of James and returns to live at the family farm so she can help her father and sister Jenny, but all does not go smoothly. Siegfried battles with a water leak, but Mrs Hall manages to tell him about her plans for the future. Carmody finds himself at odds with Helen's father over a calf's symptoms. Helen returns to Skeldale after an argument with her father but then learns the reasons for his concern about her pregnancy. Mrs Hall and Gerald face up to their various difficulties.

=== Christmas special (2023) ===
No. overall	No. in series	Title	Directed by	Written by	Original release date	UK viewers (millions)
28	7	"On a Wing and a Prayer"	Jordan Hogg	Ben Vanstone	21 December 2023	3.71
As Christmas approaches, Carmody receives a painful bite in a sensitive area. Helen is preparing for the birth of her child but almost drives to see James, who is at an RAF base near the end of his basic training. As a vet, James is ordered to care for an injured hawk which is a mascot, but is so desperate to see Helen that he leaves without permission. However, his superior officer intercepts him before he reaches Darrowby, and he has to resume looking after the bird. Siegfried, Carmody and Mrs Pumphrey spend a lot of time preparing for the Christmas lunch in the Drovers Arms, while Mrs Hall does most of the real work. Helen goes into labour and has to wait a long time for a midwife. After the injured bird flies again, James is given two days home leave and arrives to learn, to his relief, of the successful birth of his son, also named James.

=== Series 5 (2024) ===
No. overall	No. in series	Title	Directed by	Written by	Original release date	UK viewers (millions)
29	1	"To All Our Boys"	Brian Percival	Debbie O'Malley	19 September 2024	3.32
1941: Helen, Mrs Hall and Mrs Pumphrey work to support the war effort. Mrs Hall volunteers as an air raid warden, against the objections of Mr Bosworth, who relents after being reminded of everything she did while serving in the Wrens during World War I. Carmody introduces a triage system that allows him to start supporting the pet clinic. A cat that keeps appearing to have died and then recovering presents the vets with a mystery. Carmody impresses Siegfried by correctly diagnosing what is happening – the cat is accidentally ingesting morphine by licking the spoon his owner uses to take her prescribed medication. On his air force base, James prepares for a night flight to Scotland to conclude his training but faints due to the lingering effects of Brucellosis. His commanding officer concludes he is not fit for duty, and when James questions the decision he is assigned to ditch digging duty. After learning of the death of most of his crew in an ambush and successfully delivering a calf at a local farm, he requests and receives an honourable discharge and returns home to Darrowby.
30	2	"Holding the Baby"	Brian Percival	Maxine Alderton	26 September 2024	3.36
James and Helen are getting used to life with a baby. James offers to take Jimmy on a veterinary call while Helen goes to help her father and Jenny on their farm. Helen is surprised to find Jenny thinking of leaving the family farm to go work in a general store with her best friend. Mrs Hall starts her job as an Air Raid Precaution Warden and tries to keep the peace between her boss (Mr Bosworth) and Siegfried.
31	3	"Homecoming"	Stewart Svaasand	Matt Evans	3 October 2024	3.41
It's baby Jimmy's Christening Day, and there's a surprise announcement from Tristan. While Siegfried struggles to keep a promise to Tristan, Helen tries to bond with James's visiting mother, and James finds himself attending to a client's aggressive dog during the celebration
32	4	"Uninvited Guests"	Stewart Svaasand	Maxine Alderton	10 October 2024	3.46
Tristan returns to Skeldale but clashes with his new colleague, Carmody, leading Mrs Hall to send them on a mission to Pumphrey Manor to find an escaped snake, which inadvertently leads to them resolving their differences. Meanwhile, James struggles with a sick cow and deals with his resurfacing war trauma, experiencing strong emotions and conflict about his feelings of luck and responsibility, which Helen glimpses.
33	5	"Pair Bond"	Andy Hay	Robin French	17 October 2024	3.31
Carmody receives an exciting opportunity for a research position in London, prompting Siegfried to question if he's hindering his protégé's potential. Meanwhile, Mrs Hall and Mr Bosworth clash over her emergency role as a new air raid warden, and Siegfried and Carmody both navigate romantic pursuits with the glamorous Miss Grantley and Doris, respectively
34	6	"Glass Half Full"	Andy Hay	Debbie O'Malley	24 October 2024	3.19
James falls ill with brucellosis, bringing buried wartime guilt to the surface. Meanwhile, a broken-down car forces brothers Siegfried and Tristan to renegotiate their relationship while treating a horse, and they end up getting drunk on elderflower wine. The episode ends with Siegfried and Tristan stumbling home, and James finding a breakthrough in expressing his emotions to Helen about his war trauma.

=== Christmas special (2024) ===
No. overall	No. in series	Title	Directed by	Written by	Original release date	UK viewers (millions)
35	7	"All God's Creatures"	Andy Hay	Jamie Crichton	23 December 2024	3.37
Skeldale House prepares for Christmas and Jimmy's first birthday, but everyone is rocked by news that Edward's ship HMS Repulse has been sunk. Mrs Hall has to endure an agonising wait, but when a young boy arrives at the surgery with an abandoned fox cub, she can't help feeling a connection with the animal. Meanwhile, Tristan is given an important Royal Army Veterinary Corps mission to source the best Yorkshire pigeons for a new breeding programme, for which Siegfried sends him to Enoch Sykes, a cantankerous pigeon fancier whose birds are having digestive problems.

=== Series 6 (2025) ===
No. overall	No. in series	Title	Directed by	Written by	Original release date	UK viewers (millions)
36	1	"Gathering the Flock"	Brian Percival	Ben Vanstone	25 September 2025	3.13
May 1945: As the war ends, James must deal with Siegfried's increasingly erratic behaviour at Skeldale House. Tristan returns from the front, alarmed by his brother's changes. They plan to help by bringing Mrs Hall back from Sunderland, while positive developments await everyone.
37	2	"Old Dog, New Tricks"	Stewart Svaasand	Neil Jones, Karim Khan	2 October 2025	2.99
James is exhausted running between Heston and Skeldale, and to make matters worse, he's often finding himself on the wrong side of Richard Alderson, who is miffed about the muddy floor. Meanwhile, Mrs Hall and Herriot are curious about what Siegfried's been up to when James finds him wandering home after a night out.
38	3	"Captain Farnon?"	Stewart Svaasand	Robin French	9 October 2025	2.96
A memorial service is held in Darrowby to honour the war's fallen soldiers and Tristan tries to hide his emotion. He's keen to go for a drink with Siegfried, but finds himself at the bottom of his priorities. Meanwhile, James tells Mrs Pumphrey not to give up hope in her quest to find a mate for Tricki, and plans a date night to get some time with Helen.
39	4	"Jenny Wren"	Brian Percival	Nessah Muthy, Ben Vanstone	16 October 2025	2.73
Helen is thrilled when Jenny gets exciting news and sets about getting her sister prepared for a big move, but soon realises neither of them are ready for it. Mrs Hall asks for time off for her granddaughter's birthday in Sunderland, and Siegfried starts to panic.
40	5	"Fixes"	Andy Hay	Neil Jones	23 October 2025	2.74
James is worried about the practice finances but, after his pleas fall on deaf ears when he tries to discuss the matter with Siegfried, he decides to take on the role of attending vet at Hensfield dog track to earn extra money. Meanwhile, Tristan visits Mrs Ainsley, who has an aggressive parrot called George.
41	6	"Our Hearts Are Full"	Andy Hay	Nick Leather	30 October 2025	2.86
Tristan and Charlotte enjoy a romantic picnic, and James checks in at Heston Grange where Richard admits he keeps getting nuisance calls. Herriot also checks on a cow who looks ready to calve, but later the calf seems to have strangely disappeared.

=== Christmas special (2025) ===
No. overall	No. in series	Title	Directed by	Written by	Original release date	UK viewers (millions)
42	7	"Comfort and Joy"	Andy Hay	Neil Jones, Damian Wayling	24 December 2025	3.08
Christmas 1945 marks the first post-war holiday since the end of World War II. James must handle the Darrowby Nativity play while Helen is sick. The Skeldale darts team joins forces to try winning a turkey for Christmas.

=== Series 7 (2026) ===
No. overall	No. in series	Title	Directed by	Written by	Original release date	UK viewers (millions)
43	1	"Back to School"	Brian Percival	Neil Jones	17 September 2026	N/A
1946. Granville Bennett opens a practice in Brawton offering free consultations, worrying Siegfried and prompting self-reflection from James. Helen considers switching to Friesian cows and works to convince her father. Jimmy prepares for and begins school.
44	2	"The Friesians Are Coming"	Jennie Paddon	Debbie O'Malley	24 September 2026	N/A
Helen brings Friesian cows to Heston Grange to boost milk yields and keep the farm viable, while Richard prefers a cautious approach. James examines a cow and diagnoses ketosis (slow fever) from inadequate feed rather than a serious illness, treating her so she can recover within days. Tristan pushes to update the waiting room with softer chairs and better magazines, sparking a brief clash with Siegfried—who is trying to stay laid-back to impress Dorothy—that Dorothy overhears. Mrs Hall teams up with Mrs Pumphrey to organise food parcels. When sign-ups are low, Audrey sets up a church community pantry so families can take what they need quietly, later reassuring a friend who uses it.
45	3	"The Owl and the Pussycats"	Andy Hay	Maxine Alderton	1 October 2026	N/A
Siegfried pushes the practice to move faster to keep up with rival vet Granville Bennett, forcing James and Tristan to adapt to his new routine. Meanwhile, James and Helen plan to socialise with Granville and Zoe Bennett but run into a babysitter issue. Charlotte asks Tristan to help treat wild cats she has grown attached to at Beauvoir Manor. Bringing the cats back to the surgery to treat them prompts Siegfried to offer relationship advice and leaves Tristan weighing a big decision. While driving with Dorothy, Siegfried promises to put her first, checks on an uninjured female barn owl they spot along the road, and ends up proposing to her.
46	4	"Doppelganger"	Jennie Paddon	Debbie O'Malley	8 October 2026	N/A
Skeldale House celebrates Mrs Hall's birthday. Tristan is faced with a Tricki problem, involving a Pekingese dog named Tallulah. James and Siegfried perform a challenging Caesarean section on Mr Bushell's cow, Bella, after discovering her calf is too large for her pelvis.
47	5	"Farnon Herriot and Farnon"	Andy Hay	Kellie Smith	15 October 2026	N/A
Tristan gets ready for a final date with Charlotte after a botched bargain haircut and a runaway dog at the barber's. Jimmy and Siegfried team up to search for Siegfried's missing pet rat, Bunthorne. James works through a long night to treat a sick cow (Mrs Porter) in Helen's new herd, discovering signs that an infection has spread beyond the udder. He also clashes with Richard before Helen shares some candid truths.
48	6	"Give Us This Day"	Andy Hay	Neil Jones	22 October 2026	N/A
James, Siegfried, and Tristan join forces to help Granville Bennett treat a horse named Matchbox suffering from severe colic, a high temperature, and a weak pulse. Mrs Hall gets caught up in a bread rationing dispute involving baker Norris Higgins and the local constable. Siegfried realises he is in love with Mrs Hall on the eve of his wedding to Dorothy and calls off the marriage.

== International broadcasts ==
In the United States, the series premiered on 10 January 2021 on PBS via Masterpiece.

In Norway, the series premiered on 25 December 2020 on NRK TV, under the title Den nye dyrlegen (The new veterinarian).

Seasons 1 to 3 were broadcast on RTP2 in Portugal, starting in 2023.

In Ireland, Seasons 1-5 were shown on RTE One, one season behind Channel 5. Season 6 started airing on the channel on Sunday the 14th of June 2026.

== Reception ==
On the review aggregation website Rotten Tomatoes, All Creatures Great and Small has an approval rating of 99% with an average rating of 8.5/10, based on 46 critic reviews. Metacritic assigned the show a score of 84 out of 100, based on 27 critics.

The Daily Telegraph's Michael Hogan gave the first series four out of five, and commented "Revisiting the world of All Creatures Great and Small felt like meeting old friends. Any viewers missing the classic triumvirate of Robert Hardy, Christopher Timothy and Peter Davison were surely converted by this well-crafted opener, confidently directed by Downton Abbey alumnus Brian Percival". Hogan went on to call the show "family-friendly comfort-viewing. A soothing balm in febrile times".

Variety was one of the publications that praised the first series. Its chief TV critic Caroline Framke wrote that All Creatures Great and Small "finds key ways to distinguish itself from depictions past, especially as it makes the most of a handsome budget and embraces a welcome, earnest warmth in its storytelling"; she added that the update made "a beloved property worthwhile". NBC News praised the series as "pastoral perfection", commenting that the show was "never meant to be pandemic escapism... but it's hard to think of a better moment for something as simple and charming".

The Los Angeles Times's Mary McNamara disputed the apparent consensus of the show as being a necessary sanctuary in the pandemic and calling it "a disappointment" because it deviated too much from the source material.

Caroline Hallemann of Town & Country called the first series, "comforting...warm [and] uplifting". Norman Vanamee of Town & Country called the second series "the perfect getaway".

The first episode was watched by 3.3 million viewers and earned an audience share of 20.4% in the UK, making All Creatures Great and Small Channel 5's highest rated show since February 2016, which went on to become its most popular show ever. In the United States, the first series averaged more than 10 million viewers over the course of its run.
