= Brian Sinclair (veterinary surgeon) =

British veterinarian (1915–1988)

Brian Sinclair MRCVS
- Brian Sinclair — c. 1985
- Born: Wallace Brian Vaughan Sinclair; 27 September 1915; Harrogate, North Yorkshire, England
- Died: 13 December 1988 (aged 73); Leeds, West Yorkshire, England
- Resting place: Stonefall Cemetery
- Education: Royal School of Veterinary Studies, Edinburgh (1943: MRCVS)
- Spouse: Sheila Rose Seaton (m. 1944)
- Children: 3
- Relatives: Donald Sinclair (brother)
- Scientific career
- Fields: Livestock fertility; Pregnancy testing; Ringworm treatment; Salmonella typhimurium infection
- Workplaces: Veterinary Investigation Centre, Leeds
- War service
- Allegiance: United Kingdom
- Branch: British Army
- Service years: 1944–46
- Rank: Captain
- Corps: Royal Army Veterinary Corps
- Conflict: World War II

Wallace Brian Vaughan Sinclair MRCVS (27 September 1915 – 13 December 1988) was a British veterinary surgeon who worked for a time with his elder brother Donald, and Donald's business partner, Alf Wight. Wight wrote a series of semi-autobiographical novels under the pen name James Herriot, with Brian and Donald appearing in fictional form as brothers Tristan and Siegfried Farnon. The novels were adapted in two films and television series under the name All Creatures Great and Small. Tristan was portrayed as a charming rogue who was still studying veterinary medicine in the early books, constantly having to re-take examinations because of his lack of application, often found in the pub, and provoking tirades from his bombastic elder brother Siegfried.

Sinclair studied veterinary medicine at the Royal Veterinary College in Edinburgh. He graduated in 1943 and returned to his brother's practice at 23 Kirkgate in Thirsk, Yorkshire. In the following year, he enlisted in the Royal Army Veterinary Corps and married Sheila Rose, the only daughter of Douglas Seaton, a general practitioner based in Leeds. Shortly after his marriage, he was posted to Haryana in India, and on demobilisation, he joined the Ministry of Agriculture's Sterility Advisory unit in Inverness, Scotland. In 1950, the ministry offered him a transfer to the Veterinary Investigation Centre in Weetwood Lane, Leeds, a diagnostic laboratory for veterinarians in Yorkshire.

Sinclair retired in 1977 after he had risen to become head of the investigation centre. In retirement, he gave talks on Herriot and Yorkshire, and spoke at veterinary schools in the United Kingdom and the United States. When Wight's first book was published, he was delighted to be captured as Tristan and remained enthusiastic about all Wight's books. He seemed to enjoy being a celebrity and would host informal evenings for tourist groups visiting "Herriot country". He was due to appear as the lead speaker at the annual meeting of the New York State Veterinary Medical Society but he died at Leeds General Infirmary before the meeting could take place.

== Early life and education ==
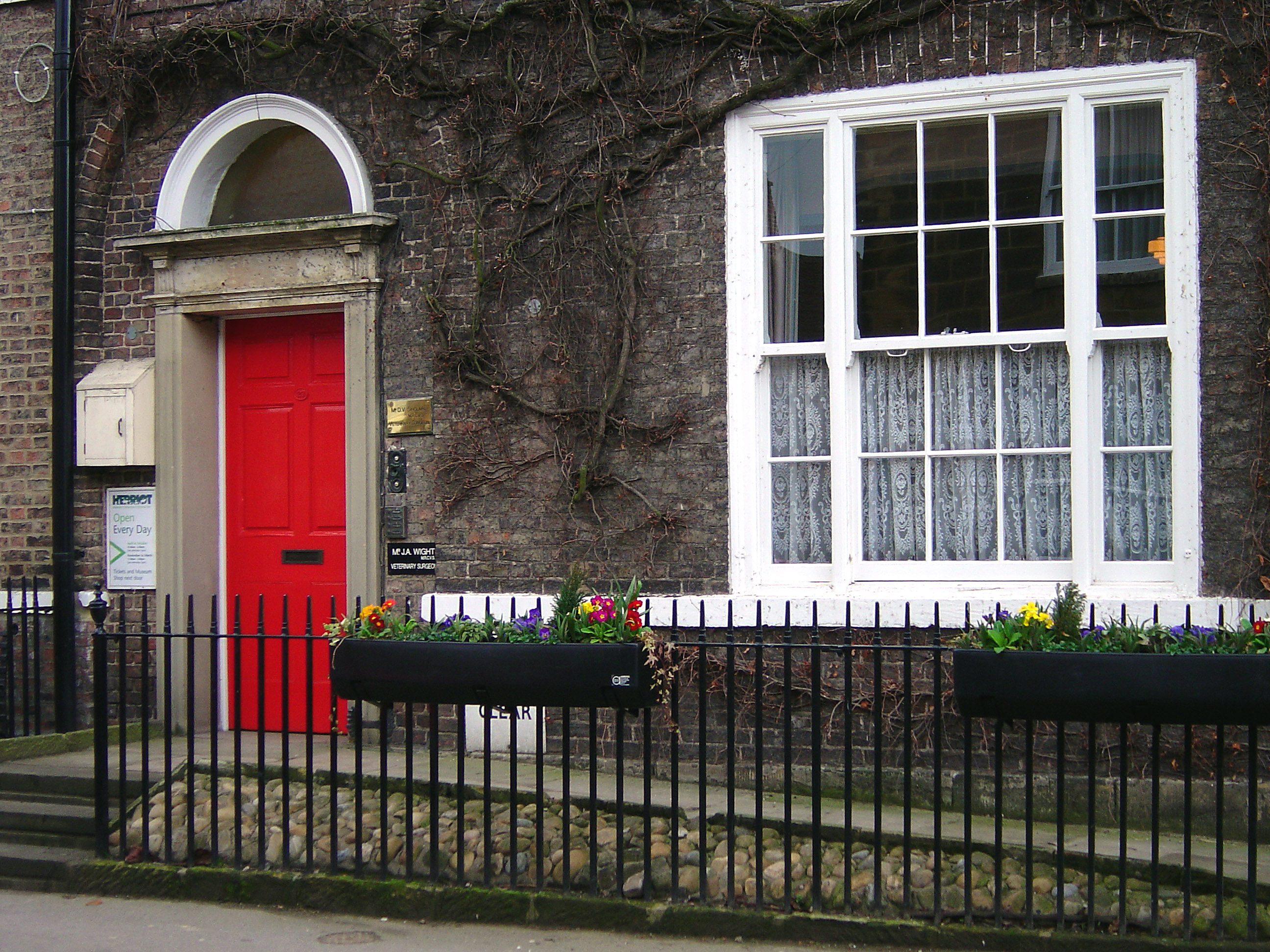
23 Kirkgate, Thirsk, the former veterinary surgery of Sinclair, his brother Donald, and James "Alf" Wight (James Herriot)

Sinclair was born at Harrogate on 27 September 1915. His father, James, was the son of a crofter who had moved from the Isle of Sanday in the late 19th century. James was said to have been a leather manufacturer but died when Sinclair was just two years old. Sinclair's elder sister, Elsa Vaughan, married Cyril Walter Russell on 5 June 1934 at St Robert's Catholic Church, Harrogate, where he gave her away. In the 1920s, his elder brother, Donald, was a veterinary student at the Royal School of Veterinary Studies in the University of Edinburgh.

In his youth, Sinclair had considered a career in dentistry, but his interest turned to veterinary medicine after assisting his cousin, then a local veterinarian, with bovine tuberculosis testing. In 1932, he entered the veterinary school at Edinburgh but failed his undergraduate examinations. His brother transferred him to Glasgow Veterinary College but he was expelled after laughing in Professor John William Emslie's pathology class. (Note: Pathology was taught in the fourth year of the course.) He finally passed his professional examinations at Edinburgh in December 1943, and in the same month, he was admitted a member of the Royal College of Veterinary Surgeons. He worked for his brother while studying veterinary medicine, and after he graduated, he returned to his brother's practice at 23 Kirkgate in Thirsk, Yorkshire.

== Veterinary career ==
After years of studying cattle, pigs, sheep and horses at Edinburgh University, I found myself in India in charge of 420 camels.

— Sinclair, interview with Norman Harper, at Harrogate in October 1981.

On 23 March 1944, Sinclair was commissioned in the Royal Army Veterinary Corps (RAVC) as a lieutenant. He had been a member of the Edinburgh University Officers' Training Corps (OTC). A month later, on 20 April 1944, he married Sheila Rose Seaton, only daughter of Douglas Seaton, a general practitioner based in Leeds, at St Robert's in Harrogate. Four months after the wedding, he was deployed to the Ambala district in the state of Haryana, India.

Sinclair was put in charge of the mules and camels used by troops in Burma. At the end of the war, he joined India's dairy programme, supervising the care of seventy thousand water buffalo on military farms, and teaching pregnancy testing to local veterinarians. The closest he got to military action was when a local tribe fired shots into the camp using home-made rifles. Alf Wight would write long letters to Sinclair, often twenty pages, that would give news from home and would finish with a description of the Yorkshire countryside. Sinclair would later say that "Reading the [Herriot] books I find that the descriptions of the countryside are just the same as in those old letters."

Attaining the rank of captain, Sinclair was demobilised in 1946. On his return to Britain, he visited the Ministry of Agriculture, Fisheries and Food (MAFF) headquarters in Surrey in search of a job. He was offered a post at the ministry's Sterility Advisory unit at Church Street, Inverness, in the Scottish Highlands. He and his wife lived at 109 Culduthel Road, Inverness, and he travelled around Scotland advising farmers and crofters on livestock fertility. In 1950, the ministry offered him a transfer to the MAFF Veterinary Investigation Centre in Weetwood Lane, Leeds, a diagnostic laboratory for veterinarians in Yorkshire. He had enjoyed working and living in the Highlands, but decided to accept the transfer to his native Yorkshire, saying later, "I would never have accepted any transfer other than one to Yorkshire ... I loved the North and North-east that much."

In 1953, Sinclair and Ken Sellers, a veterinary colleague at the centre, (Note: Kenneth Charles Sellers was later professor of veterinary pathology at the University of Ibadan, Nigeria.) reported a cross-species infection of Salmonella typhimurium in shorthorn cows on a farm in Northumberland. The herd was milked in a shed that opened onto a duck house and a pigsty. The pigs, hens, and ducks were all found to be carrying Salmonella typhimurium, although none showed signs of infection. Sinclair and Sellers concluded that the poultry had caused the infection as they had only recently been introduced to the farm. In 1959, he joined the joint MAFF Veterinary Laboratory Services and Public Health Laboratory Service committee on salmonellosis. From 1965 until his retirement in 1977, he was the lead veterinary investigation officer for the centre. (Note: In 1969, Sinclair's annual salary was around three thousand pounds (equivalent to thirty-one thousand pounds in 2021).)

From 1970 to 1974, Sinclair acted as advisor during a veterinary clinical trial that attempted to eliminate scrapie from sheep by breeding out susceptibility to it. Scrapie can kill up to twenty-five percent of sheep in an infected flock and there is no known cure. Six sheep farms, located in Yorkshire and Cumberland, were included in the trial. The farmers recorded the offspring of ewes and rams, and if they displayed symptoms of scrapie, then all affected sheep, including their relatives, would be culled from the flock. The detailed recording and culling did have some success as at least one farm was able to declare itself free of scrapie by 1974. Sinclair co-authored a number of papers on infections in cattle and sheep, such as Brucellosis and ringworm, but in general, he was not interested in academia. He considered that "having a sense of responsibility towards the animal" is the most important value a veterinarian must have.

== Literary and dramatic portrayals ==
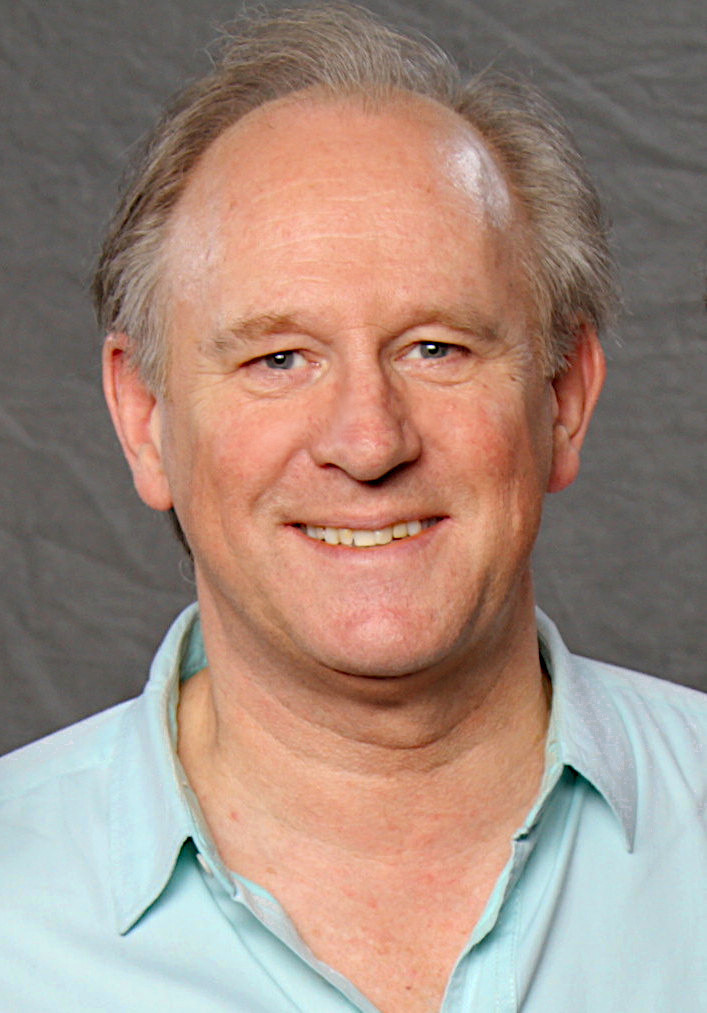
Peter Davison who played Tristan Farnon in the 1978 BBC Television series All Creatures Great and Small

When Wight's first book was published, Sinclair was delighted to be portrayed as Tristan and remained enthusiastic about all Wight's books. He had stated that the Herriot books and television shows were faithful to the truth, although occasionally, the truth was adapted for the purposes of the plot. For example, in It Shouldn't Happen To a Vet there is an account of Sinclair letting a car run away and demolishing the local golf club hut. He read this and the next time he met Wight he said "'I don't remember doing that', and he said, 'You didn't — it was me.' You see, it didn't fit James Herriot's image in the book, so he put it on to Tristan."

In 2017, Alf Wight's son, Jim Wight, was interviewed and he discussed the James Herriot franchise. He made these comments about Sinclair:

Brian [Sinclair] was accurately portrayed. A young man who was a delightful young fellow, but his whole aim in life was to work as little as possible and have as good a time as possible ... every time [Brian] failed his exams, which he did often when he was at veterinary school, Donald [Sinclair] had to pay and Donald didn't have money in those days ... So there was always that love-hate relationship between the two [brothers], very well portrayed in that first book.

The 1975 film All Creatures Great and Small was the first adaptation of Wight's semi-autobiographical novels of James Herriot. It was directed by Claude Whatham, and starred Simon Ward and Anthony Hopkins as James Herriot and Siegfried Farnon, with Brian Stirner taking the part of Tristan. At the time of filming, Stirner had played the lead role in Overlord, Stuart Cooper's 1975 film about the D-Day landings. From the first film onwards, Wight gave a percentage of his income from film and television rights to Sinclair and his brother. The sequel, It Shouldn't Happen to a Vet, premiered in 1976, but did not feature a Tristan character.

Encouraged by the cinematic success of the films, the BBC commissioned a television adaption of All Creatures Great and Small. Christopher Timothy starred as Herriot, Robert Hardy as Siegfried, and Peter Davison as Tristan. After the first rehearsal, Davison met Sinclair, and stated that meeting him "was useful because I'd worried about how to make my Tristan endearing even though he behaved appallingly." In return, Sinclair has said that he was "flattered that someone as tall and handsome as Peter Davison would play him on screen." (Note: Sinclair was a guest on Peter Davison's This Is Your Life episode that was broadcast on 25 March 1982 by ITV.) The series premiered in 1978, and ended in 1980, when Herriot and Tristan were shown to leave Darrowby to join the war effort. A new series was commissioned in 1988, but Davison had other acting commitments, and was only able to make a few appearances as Tristan in that series.

All Creatures Great and Small has been adapted for the stage by Simon Stallworthy. The play was first staged in 2010 at the Gala Theatre, Durham, with Jack Wharrier playing Tristan. In 2014, a provincial tour of the play was produced by Bill Kenwright, with Tristan being played by Lee Latchford-Evans. Since 2020, a new television adaptation of All Creatures Great and Small has been produced by Playground Entertainment for television channel 5 in the United Kingdom, and PBS in the United States. Callum Woodhouse played Tristan Farnon in the first three series and series five, however, he did not appear in series four as the Tristan character had been called up to serve in the Royal Army Veterinary Corps in the series three Christmas special.

== Later life and death ==
In retirement, Sinclair joined an after-dinner speaking agency, and was often invited to give speeches at farmers' functions in the north of England. In 1979, he toured the United Kingdom giving talks to the Ladies' Circle and the Women's Institute, on the subjects of Herriot and being a veterinary surgeon. He was later paid to go on a cruise to speak on the same themes. In addition to these talks, he would host informal evenings for American tourist groups visiting "Herriot country", on tours organised by Earl Peel. The tours would include lunch at the Kings Arms Hotel, Askrigg, where much of the television series of All Creatures Great and Small was filmed.

Later in 1979, Sinclair embarked on a lecture tour of veterinary schools in the United States. On 7 November 1979, he spoke to the student chapter of the Iowa American Veterinary Medical Association (AVMA) at the C. Y. Stephens Auditorium. The audience numbered over a thousand and he was presented with a replica statue of "The Gentle Doctor" for his contribution to veterinary medicine. (Note: The original statue by Christian Petersen stands at the entrance to the Hixson-Lied Small Animal Hospital, Iowa State University College of Veterinary Medicine.) Later in the same month, he spoke at the twelfth conference of the American Association of Bovine Practitioners. To mark the occasion, the governor of Texas signed a proclamation declaring him an honorary citizen of the state. The mayor of San Antonio also issued a proclamation naming him honorary alcalde (mayor) of the city.

Sinclair was interviewed on 21 October 1980 by Sue MacGregor when Woman's Hour broadcast from Harrogate. However, he had begun to lose weight, and was admitted to St James's University Hospital, Leeds, for tests. It was thought he was suffering from a rare pituitary gland disorder. He had been suffering from circulatory problems for some time and a visit to Australia had to be cancelled. He was also due to appear at the centennial annual meeting of the New York State Veterinary Medical Society, but he had a heart attack on 13 December 1988, and died at Leeds General Infirmary, aged 73 years.

A requiem was held on 19 December 1988 at St Robert's, Harrogate, attended by Sinclair's brother and Wight. Interment followed at Stonefall cemetery in Harrogate. He and Wight had been life-long friends and had met almost every week in a bookshop at Harrogate. (Note: Sinclair and Wight shared a common interest in Monty Python and the Marx Brothers.) His death was an emotional blow to Wight and he would later say that "Brian [Sinclair] may have been a practical joker for most of his life ... but, beneath that hilarious veneer, was a sound and dependable man. A true friend in every sense of the word." He was survived by his wife and their three daughters.

== Selected publications ==
=== Academic papers ===
==== As author ====
- Sellers, Kenneth Charles; Sinclair, Wallace Brian Vaughan (1953). "A case of Salmonella typhimurium infection in cattle and its isolation from other sources". Veterinary Record. 65. British Veterinary Association. London: John Wiley & Sons: 233–234. ISSN 0042-4900. OCLC 803781252.
- Sellers, Kenneth Charles; Sinclair, Wallace Brian Vaughan; La Touche, Charles John (1956). "Preliminary observations on natural and experimental ringworm in cattle". Veterinary Record. 68. British Veterinary Association. London: John Wiley & Sons: 729–732. ISSN 0042-4900. OCLC 803781252.
- Hunter, D.; Sinclair, Wallace Brian Vaughan; Williams, David Rhys (March 1969). "Infection of sheep in Yorkshire with Salmonella abortusovis". Veterinary Record. 84 (13). British Veterinary Association. London: John Wiley & Sons: 350. ISSN 0042-4900. OCLC 803781252. PMID 5815883.

==== As experimental collaborator ====
- Crowley, James Patrick (October 1964). "Abortion and perinatal mortality in sheep associated with toxoplasmosis". Irish Journal of Agricultural Research. 3 (2). Castleknock: Teagasc: 159–164. ISSN 0578-7483. JSTOR 25555336. "Sinclair provided unpublished data on Brucella abortus."
- Wright, J. A.; Rook, John Allan Fynes; Panes, John Joseph (October 1969). "The winter decline in the solids‑not‑fat content of herd bulk‑milk supplies" (PDF). Journal of Dairy Research. 36 (3). Cambridge University Press: 399–407. doi:10.1017/S0022029900012917. ISSN 0022-0299. OCLC 1016374002. S2CID 86696150. Archived (PDF) from the original on 22 November 2022.

== See also ==
- Tristan Farnon character
- Peter Davison
- Callum Woodhouse
