= Donald Sinclair (veterinary surgeon) =

Inspiration for fictional character Siegfried Farnon

- Born: 22 April 1911; Borough of Harrogate, North Yorkshire, England
- Died: 28 June 1995 (aged 84); Hambleton District, North Yorkshire, England
- Occupation: Veterinary surgeon
- Known for: Being depicted as Siegfried Farnon in Alf Wight's semi-autobiographical books
- Spouses: Evelyn Holborow (m. 1930; died 1936) Audrey Adamson (m. 1943; died 1995)
- Children: 2
- Relatives: Brian Sinclair (brother)

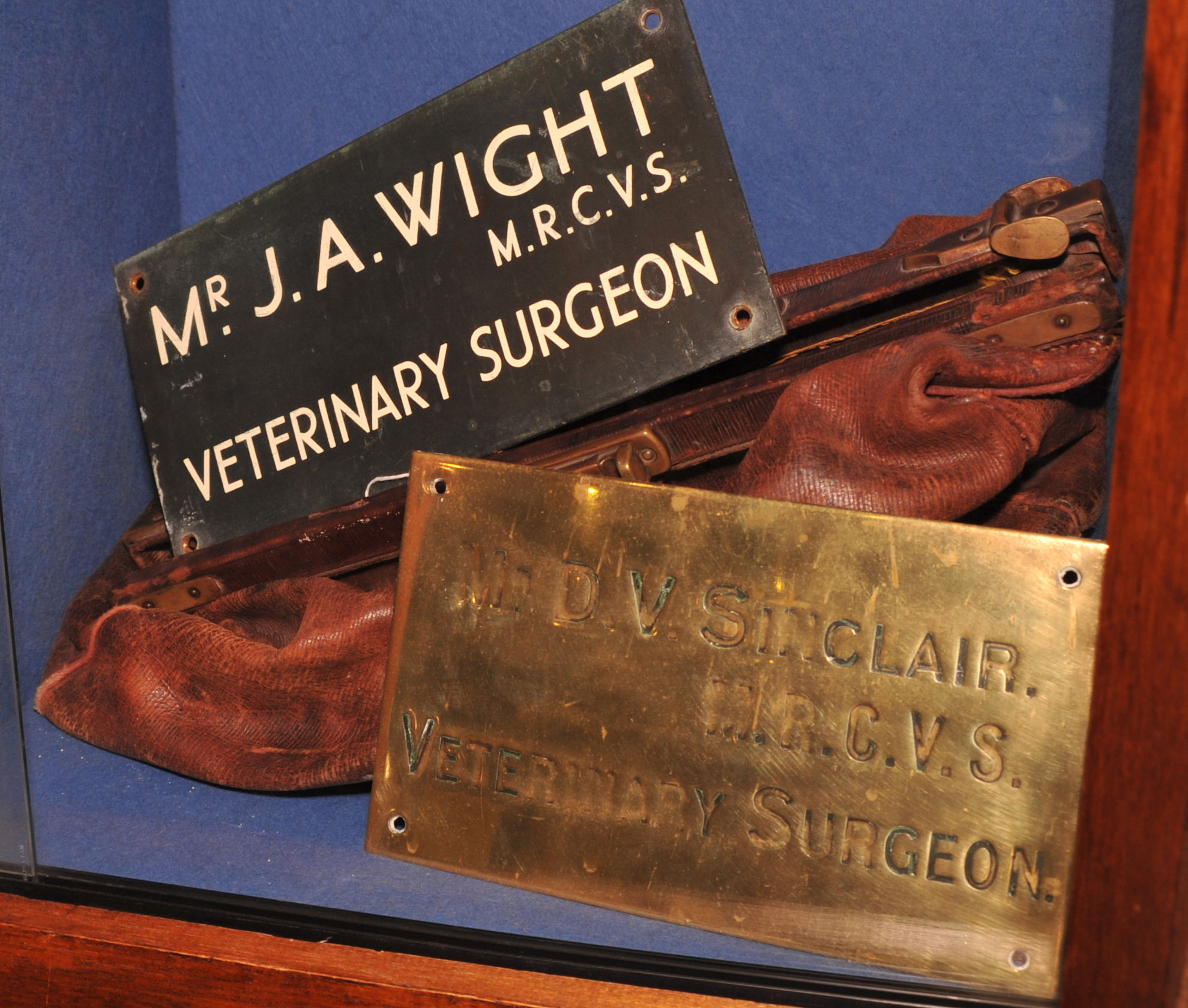
Original name plates for Donald Sinclair (Siegfried Farnon) and Alf Wight (James Herriot) on display at the James Herriot museum in Thirsk, UK

Donald Vaughan Sinclair (22 April 1911 – 28 June 1995) was a British veterinary surgeon who graduated from the Royal (Dick) School of Veterinary Studies in 1933. He was made famous as the inspiration for the eccentric character Siegfried Farnon, in the semi-autobiographical books of James Herriot (Alf Wight), adapted for film and television as All Creatures Great and Small.

== Royal Air Force service ==
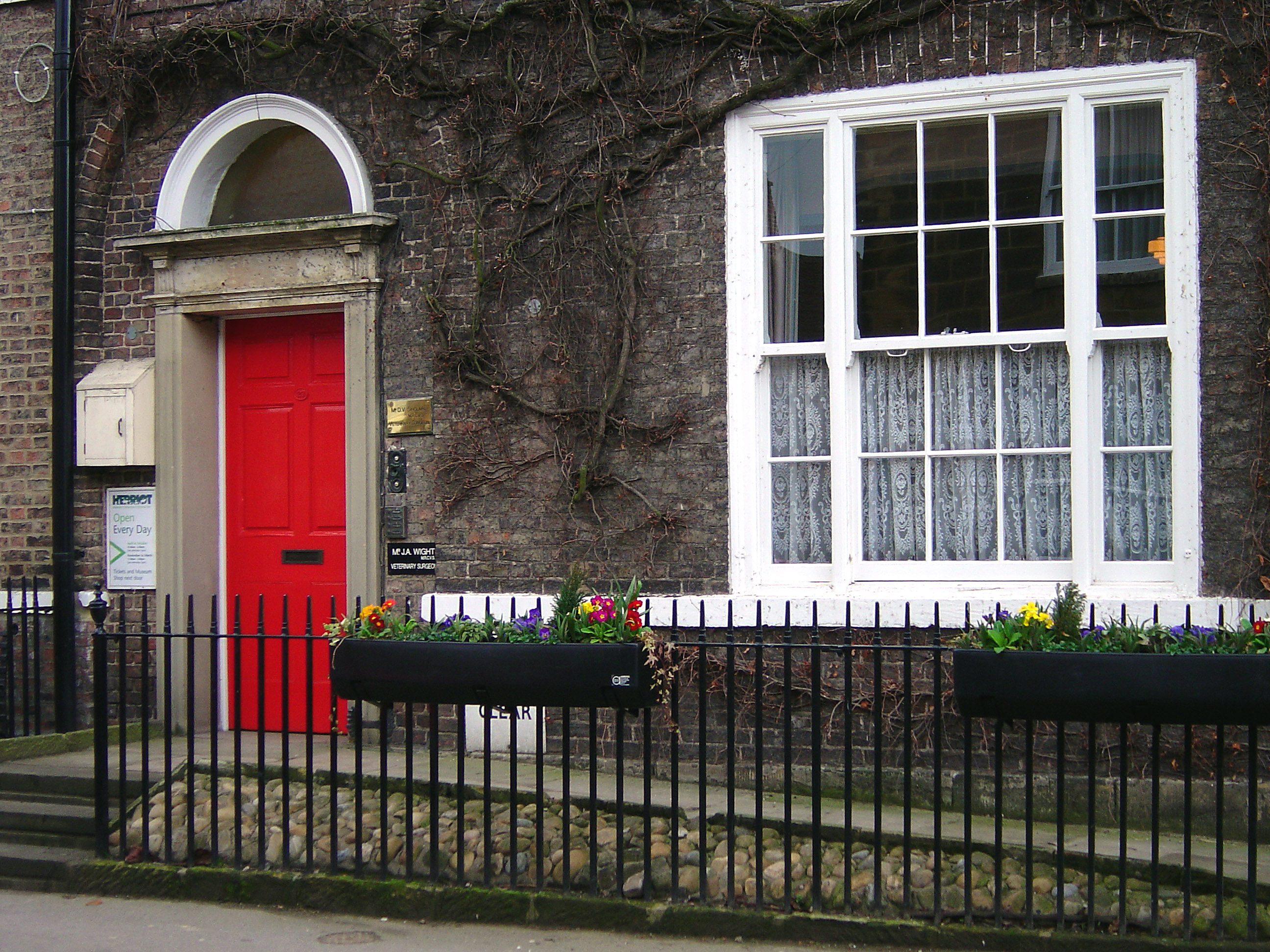
The building which was the veterinary surgery of Alf Wight and Brian and Donald Sinclair, 23 Kirkgate, Thirsk. It is now The World of James Herriot museum. (2009 photo)

In 1939, Sinclair bought a veterinary practice at 23 Kirkgate, Thirsk, Yorkshire. In July 1940, Sinclair began war service in the Royal Air Force and hired Alf Wight to run the practice. To join up, Sinclair had claimed to be younger than he was. It was quickly discovered that his reflexes were not fast enough for him to continue with pilot training. He could have been redeployed within the service, but the fact that he was a veterinary surgeon meant that he was considered to be more useful to the war effort by resuming his peacetime profession. The severe national food shortage meant that proper veterinary treatment of farm animals received a high priority and so, within four months of joining the RAF, Sinclair received a compulsory discharge and returned to Thirsk.

== Veterinary practice ==
Articles about Alf Wight shed more light on the start of the relationship between the two vets. When Sinclair was about to leave for RAF training, he gave Wight all the income of the practice, in return for looking after it during his absence. His brother, Brian Sinclair (Tristan in the books), was not then qualified. After Sinclair was discharged from the RAF, he asked Wight to stay permanently with the practice, offering a salaried partnership, which Wight accepted.

== Literary portrayal ==
The fictional Siegfried Farnon is outspoken, opinionated, bossy, quick to lose his temper, and also quick to calm down. He is good-hearted and an animal lover, fond of riding, and infuriated by any suspicion of cruelty to animals. A theme in Herriot's stories was Siegfried's criticism of James's flaws, such as forgetting appointments or leaving instruments behind after calls, only for the reader to find that Siegfried is guilty of the same things. Siegfried also is forgetful, frequently telling people things and then forgetting them within the same day, though he refuses to believe that when told.

After Wight's first book was published, Sinclair was offended by his portrayal and said, "Alfred, this book is a real test of our friendship". (He never called Wight "Alf", mirrored in the books by Siegfried always referring to Herriot as "James" rather than "Jim".) One of the things he was unhappy about was the name Siegfried, a German name with Wagnerian echoes which, in the 1930s, would have stirred thoughts of Nazis. "Sinclair was so peeved by Wight’s portrayal that at one point he threatened to sue him". Things calmed down and the pair continued to work together until they retired.

Robert Hardy, who played the role of Siegfried Farnon in the BBC Television series, visited Sinclair before playing him, and developed the character based upon his observations. Hardy reminisced that Sinclair hated the way that Hardy played him, and that, Hardy claimed, Sinclair was wholly unaware of his own eccentricities. They subsequently became friends, Sinclair forgiving Hardy. Hardy has said: "I always wished I'd known him before ... It would have helped me to perfect a much more interesting character."

Alf Wight's son, Jim, wrote in his book, The Real James Herriot, that Sinclair's character in the novels was considerably toned down, and that Sinclair was even more eccentric than the Herriot books portrayed.

In an interview in 2017, Jim Wight said that "One of the misconceptions [about Alf Wight] was that Sinclair ... was a tyrant and my father was a wimp. Because my father worked harder than Sinclair did, that is absolutely true ... But ... he supported Donald in many ways but he also earned more than Donald. He said to Donald, 'Look, I’m doing all the work. Everything that I do goes into my pocket and everything you do goes into yours.' That’s fair enough, isn’t it?" ... Sinclair married money; he didn’t need to work too much. My father ... needed the money when he was a young vet, and he was prepared to work for it. And with Donald Sinclair, with Siegfried, he had a partner who he knew, despite all his idiosyncrasies and faults, would never stab him in the back."

== Personal life and death ==
Sinclair married first wife Evelyn (née Holborow) in 1930. She died of tuberculosis in 1936.

Sinclair married his second wife Audrey (née Adamson) in 1943, and they remained together for 53 years until her death in 1995. They had two children, a son and a daughter.

Sinclair killed himself with an overdose of barbiturates on 28 June 1995 at his home, Southwoods Hall near Thirsk, two weeks after the death of his wife.
