= Tristan A. Farnon =

American cartoonist

Tristan Alexander Farnon is an American webcomic author, creator of comic strip Leisure Town, the Silent Key podcast and Spigot. He is one of the founding creators of the Microsoft Comic Chat-based webcomic Jerkcity, now known as Bonequest.

== Leisure Town ==
Leisure Town features photographs of bendable toy figures digitally superimposed onto separately photographed backgrounds to create each frame. While the "characters" are children's toys, the comics explore mature themes. The strip ran from 1997 to 2003 (although in a reduced format from 2001 to 2003); some limited additional content was published in what appears to have been a one-time event in 2005. The strip is still being published on the Internet, but no new content has been published since 2005.
