= Murder of Shiori Ino =

1999 murder in Japan

- Shiori Ino
- Location: Okegawa, Saitama Prefecture, Japan
- Date: 26 October 1999; 27 years ago
- Attack type: Murder by stabbing, contract killing, murder-suicide
- Deaths: 2 (including a perpetrator)
- Victims: Shiori Ino, aged 21
- Perpetrators: Yoshifumi Kubota (hitman); Kazuhito Komatsu (Note: Committed suicide after learning that a warrant had been issued for his arrest.); Takeshi Komatsu; Akira Kawakami; Yoshitaka Ito
- Motive: Revenge for romantic rejection
- Verdict: Guilty on all counts
- Convictions: Kubota, Kawakami, Ito, Takeshi: Murder; Katagiri, Furuta, Honda: Documents falsification
- Sentence: Takeshi: Life imprisonment Kubota: 18 years in prison Kawakami, Ito: 15 years in prison Katagiri, Furuta: 1 1/2 year suspended sentence Honda: 1 1/6 year suspended sentence
- Convicted: Convicted for police incompetence: Toshio Katagiri; Hirokazu Furuta; Tsuyoshi Honda

Shiori Ino (猪野 詩織, Ino Shiori; May 18, 1978 – 26 October 1999) was a 21-year-old Japanese student who was murdered in Okegawa, Saitama Prefecture, on 26 October 1999.

Ino was stabbed to death by Yoshifumi Kubota, a hitman hired by her abusive ex-boyfriend, Kazuhito Komatsu, and his brother Takeshi Komatsu, after months of stalking and violent threats against Ino and her family after she ended the relationship. Ino's murder exposed a significant dereliction of duties by the Saitama Prefecture police force, brought about changes to the legal treatment of stalking in Japan, and is considered an example of media manipulation.

Four men were charged and tried for the murder of Ino. Kazuhito committed suicide after learning that a warrant had been issued for his arrest. All four alive perpetrators were found guilty. Three of the four were sentenced to prison terms ranging from 15 to 18 years, and Takeshi Komatsu was sentenced to life in prison. He appealed his sentence to the Japanese Supreme Court, but his life sentence was upheld.

Three ex-police officers were convicted for police incompetence, as they did not pursue Ino's reports of Kazuhito's stalking and abuse. The ex-police were sentenced to over one year of suspended sentences. Ino's family also won a lawsuit against the Saitama police department, with a court ruling that their misconduct had endangered Ino, but they did not admit that their incompetence caused her death.

== Stalking ==
In January 1999, Shiori Ino, a 21-year-old university student, began dating Kazuhito Komatsu (小松 和人, Komatsu Kazuhito), a 26-year-old who operated a series of brothels with his brother Takeshi, a firefighter; Kazuhito lied to Ino that the brothels were "massage parlors". The two had met at an amusement arcade near Ōmiya Station in Ōmiya Ward, Saitama. Komatsu claimed to be a 23-year-old entrepreneur who dealt in cars, real estate, and precious metals.

After four or five dates, Komatsu began presenting Ino with expensive gifts such as Louis Vuitton handbags and Gucci suits in public places and screamed abuse at her when she refused them. Komatsu also began calling Ino at home, despite the fact that she had only given him her cell phone number. Around this time, Ino found a credit card featuring Komatsu's real name inside his car. When Ino attempted to break off contact, Komatsu threatened her until she agreed to keep seeing him. On 24 March, Ino confided in a friend that she feared for her life.

On 30 March, Ino wrote a will and attempted again to break off the relationship with Komatsu, but relented after he threatened her family, including insinuations about physically harming her younger brother, an elementary school student.

On 14 June, Ino met Komatsu at a cafe and unequivocally stated her intention not to see him again. The same day, Komatsu, Takeshi and their friend went to the Ino family home, and threatened both Ino and her mother, presenting them with a series of lies about Ino being liable for fictional embezzlements that Komatsu had committed. They threatened Ino's father when he returned from work, who, unmoved, ordered them out of the house after telling them to take the gifts Komatsu had forced on Ino. The three retreated, stating they did not want the gifts back.

Unbeknownst to them, Ino had made an audio recording of the entire ordeal, which she presented to the Saitama Prefecture police station in Ageo the next day. Despite the outrage of one younger officer, the officers who met Ino told her that she had no case.

That day, the Ino family received a call from someone calling himself "Tanaka" demanding the return of the gifts, following a series of about twenty silent calls. This daily barrage of silent calls continued until 26 October.

On 16 June, Ino again went to the Saitama police with her parents. The police again refused to take action, and suggested that she was at fault for breaking up with a smitten suitor after accepting expensive gifts.

They also went to a free legal clinic run by the Chamber of Commerce, as the police suggested. After a fifteen-minute consultation, the lawyer dismissed their concerns, stating, "But she had a lot of things bought for her, right?"

The following day, Ino received a call from Komatsu demanding they get back together. She refused, and stated that she had been to the police. He reacted angrily before hanging up abruptly.

On 21 June, Ino sent everything Komatsu had forced on her back to his address by courier service. The following day, 22 June, he approached 33-year-old Yoshifumi Kubota, a former manager of one of their brothels, with a ¥20 million murder-for-hire scheme at Komatsu's behest. Kubota agreed, and in turn recruited two acquaintances, Akira Kawakami and Yoshitaka Ito.

On 5 July, Komatsu departed Saitama Prefecture for Naha, Okinawa Prefecture, to build an alibi for the planned assassination of Ino.

Over the next four months, Ino's family endured an escalating series of harassments and threats, including hundreds of posters and letters slandering Ino and her father distributed throughout the neighborhood and to the father's workplace. The family repeatedly went to the police armed with the letters, photos of license plates and other evidence, without any action being taken.

They pressed libel charges, only to be actively obstructed by senior precinct police officers who were worried that having unresolved open cases would hurt their standing. In the meantime, Kubota, Kawakami and Ito, possessing a photograph of Ino, watched her residence and the local train station to plan her murder.

== Murder ==
On 26 October 1999, Ino left her home on a bicycle, heading for Okegawa Station in Okegawa to attend afternoon classes at her college. Ito, watching from a nearby car, alerted Kawakami, who drove to the station and dropped off Kubota.

As Ino got off her bicycle, Kubota walked up and stabbed her once in the side. As Ino turned, Kubota stabbed her again in the heart. Ino was pronounced dead at 12:50 p.m. at Ageo Central General Hospital, with her cause of death listed as shock due to massive bleeding.

Immediately following Ino's murder, the Saitama police began a campaign of disinformation, falsely portraying her as a promiscuous flirt with a taste for expensive brand-name goods.

The tabloids, then the mainstream press, quickly jumped on the bandwagon, manufacturing lurid stories about Ino working as an escort. The Komatsu brothers and their accomplices were not arrested until a journalist, Kiyoshi Shimizu, investigated the case for himself. Shimizu's report, published in the magazine FOCUS, laid bare Ino's long ordeal with Komatsu, and included a photograph of her stalker.

On 19 December 1999, Kubota was arrested, and the next day, Takeshi, Kawakami and Ito were also arrested. On 16 January 2000, eight other people were arrested for assisting with the harassment of Ino, and a warrant was issued for Komatsu, who managed to evade arrest and went to Sapporo, Hokkaido, where he was tracked by Shimizu.

On 27 January 2000, Komatsu's corpse was found in a lake in Teshikaga. Komatsu's death was found to be a suicide, with a note in his hotel luggage indicating that he had planned to kill himself soon after he had arranged Ino's murder.

== Aftermath ==
A legislative hearing was convened into the handling of the Ino case by the Saitama Prefecture police, who were criticized in the media for dereliction of duty. The head of the police force formally apologized to the Ino family.

Following an investigation, six officers were disciplined and three senior police officers were fired and indicted on a documents falsification charge over their refusal to process the charges brought by Ino during Komatsu's harassment campaign.

On 7 September 2000, Toshio Katagiri and Hirokazu Furuta were each sentenced to a year and a half in prison, while Tsuyoshi Honda was sentenced to one year and two months in prison.

However, they were allowed to receive suspended sentences. On 22 December 2000, Ino's family sued the Saitama police. On 16 February 2003, a district court ruled that the police would have to pay consolation money, but denied that police neglect had allowed Ino's murder to occur. On appeal, on 30 August 2006, the Supreme Court upheld the original sentence.

In November 2000, a stalker regulation law took effect as a result of Ino's murder. In 2001, Shimizu received the Editors' Choice Magazine Journalism Award and the National Association of Commercial Broadcasters in Japan Reporting Award for his coverage of the Ino case. He would later receive the same awards again after getting an innocent man cleared of charges in the Ashikaga murder case (part of the North Kanto Serial Young Girl Kidnapping and Murder Case) and pointed out similarities with how the police and prosecutors handled the Ashikaga and Iizuka cases compared to the Ino case.

Kubota was sentenced to eighteen years in prison. Kawakami and Ito were each sentenced to fifteen years in prison. Takeshi was sentenced to life imprisonment, but he appealed. On 5 September 2006, the Supreme Court upheld his original sentence.

In June 2003, the Saitama District Court ordered the Saitama Prefectural Government to pay 5.5 million yen to Ino's family for "betraying" the victim's trust, but did not rule in favor of blaming the police for failures in investigating her stalking complaints. The Inos appealed the ruling to the supreme court.

As of 2025, Kenichi Ino has given lectures on Shiori's death and stalking at various police academies.

== Media ==
In Japan, the murder of Shiori Ino has been dramatized for television three times:

- One version, based on Shimizu's writing, was aired on 28 October 2002.
- Another version, in which Rina Uchiyama played the role of Ino, was aired on 13 December 2003.
- A third version was aired on 26 September 2012, as part of the variety documentary The World's Astonishing News! (ザ!世界仰天ニュース, Za! Sekai Gyōten Nyūsu), in an episode titled The Okegawa Stalker Incident... Why was a female university student killed? (桶川ストーカー事件…なぜ女子大生は殺されたのか？). In this version, the Ino family are portrayed with their real names, while the culprits are portrayed with pseudonyms.
  - On 21 May 2016, an attempted murder by a stalker occurred in Koganei, Tokyo, leading to an amendment to the Stalker Regulation Law. As a tribute to this incident, The World's Astonishing News! edited the previously aired episode featuring the murder of Shiori Ino, and aired it again on 12 October 2016. In this edited version, the culprits are no longer identified by name, and the parts that previously featured the culprits' pseudonyms have been cut out, redubbed or blurred.

== See also ==
- Investigative journalism
