= Joji Obara =

Korean-Japanese serial rapist (born 1952)

- 織原 城二
- Born: August 10, 1952 (age 74); Osaka, Japan
- Occupation: Serial rapist

Joji Obara (織原 城二, Obara Jōji), born Kim Sung-jong (Korean: 김성종; Hanja: 金聖鐘) (born 10 August 1952) is a Korean-Japanese serial rapist who raped between 150 and 400 women between 1992 and 2000. Obara was charged with the drugging, rape and murder of Englishwoman Lucie Blackman; the rape and manslaughter of Australian woman Carita Ridgway; and the rape of eight other women.

In 2007, Obara was sentenced to life imprisonment on multiple rape charges and manslaughter but was acquitted in the Blackman case for lack of direct evidence. The following year, the Tokyo High Court found Obara guilty on the counts of abduction, dismemberment and disposal of Blackman's body. Blackman's death, as well as Obara's trial, received extensive press coverage internationally, especially in the United Kingdom.

== Background ==
Obara was born Kim Sung-jong to Zainichi Korean parents on 10 August 1952 in Osaka, Japan. During his youth, Obara's father worked his way from a scrap collector to the immensely wealthy owner of a string of properties and pachinko parlors. Obara was educated at private schools in Tokyo and received daily tutoring in a variety of subjects. At the age of 15, he enrolled in a prestigious prep school affiliated with Keio University, virtually guaranteeing his acceptance into the university.

Two years later, following his father's death in Hong Kong, Obara inherited property in Osaka and Tokyo. After traveling extensively and graduating from Keio University with degrees in politics and law, he became a naturalized Japanese citizen and legally changed his name to Joji Obara. Obara invested heavily in real estate speculation, gaining assets estimated as much as US$38 million. After losing his fortune and firm during the 1990s recession, Obara was pursued by creditors and reportedly used his business as a money laundering front for the yakuza syndicate Sumiyoshi-kai.

== Crimes ==
Obara was a habitual drug user. He developed a pattern of criminal behavior, beginning with unlawfully administering drugs to render his victims unconscious, then abducting and raping them. Obara victimized women of both Japanese and Western backgrounds. Obara recorded his attacks on videotape, at least 400 of which were recovered by police, giving them cause to believe that he might have raped anywhere from 150 to 400 women. Police found extensive journals in which Obara made reference to "conquest play", a euphemism describing his sexual assaults on women whom he wrote were “good only for sex" and on whom he sought "revenge on the world" after drugging them with chloroform.

=== Carita Ridgway ===
Carita Simone Ridgway (3 March 1970 – 29 February 1992) was an Australian model from Claremont, Western Australia, who was working in Tokyo's Ginza area as a bar hostess to earn money for acting school. Common in East Asian nations, "hostess" in this sense describes a modern form of geisha entertainer, i.e. young women at bars who are paid to engage in conversation with men, light their cigarettes, sing karaoke and sometimes dance – with a strict policy against men touching the hostesses or making sexual propositions. Popular hostesses often receive drinks, presents and social invitations from their favourite customers.

Ridgway, who was offered a lift by Obara, was drugged; this led to chloroform-related liver failure and brain death. Obara's culpability was exposed when, while using an alias, he took an unconscious Ridgway to the hospital claiming that she was suffering from shellfish-related food poisoning. Ridgway died after life support was stopped at her family's request; her body was cremated and repatriated to Australia. The cause of death was initially deemed hepatitis E, and there was no support for an investigation by the Australian embassy or by Japanese police as requested by the family. When police later searched Obara's home, they found a diary entry that read, "Carita Ridgway, too much chloroform", and a videotape of Obara raping Ridgway.

=== Lucie Blackman ===
Lucie Jane Blackman (1 September 1978 – 1 July 2000) was an Englishwoman from Sevenoaks, Kent, who worked as a bar hostess in Tokyo. Blackman had previously worked as a flight attendant for British Airways and went to Japan to see the world and earn money to repay her debts. At the time of her death, she was working as a hostess at Casablanca, a nightclub later known as Greengrass, in Roppongi. On 1 July, she went on a dōhan (paid date) with a Casablanca customer. Other than a few calls to a friend during the date, no one heard from her again.

Blackman's family flew to Tokyo and started a high-profile media campaign. They approached British foreign secretary Robin Cook, who was visiting Tokyo at that time. Newspapers started publicizing Blackman's disappearance on 13 July, when British prime minister Tony Blair mentioned the case during an official visit to Japan, where he met with Japanese prime minister Yoshiro Mori. An information hotline was staffed by British immigrants, and an anonymous businessman funded a reward of £100,000.

As a result of the publicity surrounding the case, three foreign women came forward to describe waking up sore and sick in Obara's bed, with no memory of the night before. Several of them had reported him to Roppongi police, but were ignored. It was also around this time that police made the connection between cases via Obara.

On 9 February 2001, Blackman's body was found in a shallow grave under a bathtub in a seaside cave at Miura, Kanagawa, about 50 kilometres (31 mi) south of Tokyo and a few hundred meters from Obara's apartment. The body had been cut into ten pieces and put inside separate bags, her head shaved and encased in concrete. The body was too decomposed to show the cause of death. According to Obara's indictment, he made Blackman a drink containing a drug before raping her at a condominium in Zushi, then killed her. Obara has maintained his innocence, claiming the drugs were voluntarily self-administered.

== Trial ==
In October 2000, Obara was charged with the drugging, rape and murder of Blackman, as well as the manslaughter of Ridgway and the rape of eight other women. His trial began on July 4, 2001. On April 24, 2007, Obara was found guilty of multiple charges of rape and manslaughter, but was acquitted of Blackman's rape and murder for lack of direct evidence. Evidence supporting his guilt of rape included the approximately 400 videos shot by Obara, which showed him raping women (including one with Ridgway). For the charge of manslaughter, the prosecutor produced an autopsy report showing traces of chloroform in Ridgway's liver and a paper trail showing that Obara accompanied her to the hospital before she died. In Blackman's case, however, the prosecutor could not produce any forensic evidence linking Obara to her death. Blackman's cause of death could not be determined.

Blackman's father, Tim Blackman, accepted £450,000 in mimaikin (見舞金, condolence money) from a friend of Obara's. Her other family members were opposed to accepting the money. Some of the money was used to establish the Lucie Blackman Trust (later called LBT Global), a charity providing safety advice for British people overseas, and assistance for families of British people missing, or murdered, abroad. The judge stated that in deciding on the sentence he did not attach much importance to Obara's payment of "consolation money" to a number of his victims.

Former prosecutor Takeshi Tsuchimoto criticised the decision to acquit Obara for the murder of Blackman by pointing to the conviction of Masumi Hayashi due to circumstantial evidence. The public prosecutor, however, appealed the Blackman-related verdicts, as crucial forensic evidence had not been heard at the original trial, and on March 25, 2008, an appeal trial commenced in the Tokyo High Court. The court found Obara guilty on the counts of abduction, dismemberment and disposal of Blackman's body on December 16, 2008. In early December 2010, the Supreme Court of Japan rejected Obara's appeal and upheld his life sentence.

The Japanese judicial system received criticism for its handling of the case. It is believed that police did not take Blackman's disappearance seriously "because Lucie was working illegally in a job from which women often flee without notice." As a result, the discovery of the body came too late to determine the cause of death. The verdict, by a panel of three judges, cited the lack of forensic evidence as a reason for acquittal. Some foreign media from common law countries also criticised Japanese police for having leaked information to the press.

== Media ==
- On February 29, 2008, ABC News aired a US documentary titled Vanished in Japan related to the two deaths.
- People Who Eat Darkness: The Fate of Lucie Blackman – a February 2011 book by Richard Lloyd Parry.
- On February 24, 2019, Casefile True Crime Podcast aired an episode revisiting the case.
- RedHanded Podcast: Episode 9, "The Beast With The Human Face"
- Asian Madness Podcast: Episode92, “Deadly Obsessions”
- Missing: The Lucie Blackman Case (Netflix, 2023)
- Evidence Locker True Crime Podcast: 11. Japan | The Hostess Murders (Carita Ridgway and Lucie Blackman (Joji Obara)

== See also ==
- List of serial rapists
- Murder of Lindsay Hawker
