= Murder of Lindsay Hawker =

British teacher murdered in Japan

Lindsay Hawker
- Born: Lindsay Ann Hawker; 30 December 1984; Coventry, England
- Died: 26 March 2007 (aged 22); Ichikawa, Chiba, Japan
- Cause of death: Asphyxia due to suffocation
- Education: University of Leeds
- Occupation: Teacher

On 26 March 2007, 22-year-old English teacher Lindsay Ann Hawker was murdered by 28-year-old Tatsuya Ichihashi (市橋 達也, Ichihashi Tatsuya), in Ichikawa, Chiba Prefecture, Japan. Ichihashi was seen fleeing his apartment, and police sought him for the murder of Hawker and the abandonment of her corpse.

The police arrested Ichihashi on 10 November 2009. On 5 July 2011, Ichihashi confessed to killing Hawker, stating that he smothered her to prevent her from screaming while he raped her. He was sentenced to life imprisonment on 21 July 2011.

== Background ==
=== Lindsay Hawker ===
Lindsay Hawker was born on 30 December 1984 to Bill and Julia Hawker, who lived in Coventry, England; her family came from the nearby village of Brandon, Warwickshire. She was schooled at King Henry VIII School, Coventry, and studied biology at the University of Leeds, when she achieved a first-class honours degree, graduating in 2006.

Although she planned to pursue a Master's degree, she taught English for a year in Japan starting in October 2006 at the Koiwa, Tokyo, branch of Nova—then Japan's largest private English conversation school. Hawker shared her accommodation with two other foreign female teachers. On the day she disappeared, her family became distressed because of her lack of usual contact via Skype, email or telephone.

=== Tatsuya Ichihashi ===
Tatsuya Ichihashi
- 市橋達也
- Born: 5 January 1979 (age 47); Gifu Prefecture, Japan
- Status: Incarcerated
- Criminal charges: Murder; Rape
- Penalty: Life imprisonment

Details
- Victims: Lindsay Ann Hawker, 22
- Date: 26 March 2007

Tatsuya Ichihashi (市橋 達也, Ichihashi Tatsuya) was born in Gifu Prefecture on 5 January 1979. He grew up in Gifu as well as in Chiba Prefecture, just east of Tokyo. His mother is a dentist and his father is a medical doctor. After graduating from the Department of Horticulture at Chiba University in 2005, Ichihashi did not work and lived on a monthly allowance of about ¥100,000—around £600 or $760 at that time—from his parents. Ichihashi was 28 years old at the time of the murder, and lived in the city of Ichikawa in Chiba.

Ichihashi had no previous convictions, but he had been the subject of an allegation of "theft and injury" six years before Hawker's death. He had allegedly assaulted a man on the street during a robbery, but the matter had been settled out of court. Ichihashi had been in a stable, year-long relationship with a Japanese woman at the time of Hawker's killing. Police described him as a loner with an obsession for physical fitness; he regularly attended a gym and cycled 25 kilometres (16 mi) a day, which some reporters linked to the case.

=== Meeting ===
Hawker told her boyfriend in England how she met Ichihashi in an e-mail message. Five days before she died, Ichihashi approached Hawker during her train journey home from work. He at first said Hawker was his English teacher (she was not) and then asked her to confirm that. Ichihashi chased her as she cycled home and asked for a glass of water when she arrived. Hawker felt sorry for him and allowed him inside her flat, but showed him to her two flatmates as a precaution. Once inside, Ichihashi drew a picture of her and signed it with his name, telephone number and e-mail address. The pair agreed to meet for an English lesson at a cafe five days later, which was permitted by the Nova school.

== Events ==
Hawker and Ichihashi met on Sunday, 25 March 2007 in a cafe. Afterwards, they caught a taxi to Ichihashi's apartment, a few hundred yards away. Hawker told the taxi driver to wait for a short time and went to the apartment. Seven minutes later, the taxi driver left after she failed to return. Hawker's naked body was found the next day buried in a bath filled with a mixture of compost soil and sand on the apartment's balcony. She had been bound and gagged with plastic ties and scarves, with one of her hands sticking out of the mixture.

Bruises across Hawker's upper body indicated that she had been subjected to a prolonged attack. Police said the egg-sized bruises on the left side of her face appeared to have been inflicted by a fist, while lesser marks on her upper body resulted from collisions with furniture. Both Hawker and Ichihashi were familiar with martial arts; Ichihashi was more experienced than Hawker, having attained a black belt. Hawker had died after her assailant began strangling her and broke the cartilage in her neck. Hawker's head was shaved after she was killed. Her possessions were found strewn across the room.

Media had reported in the days after Hawker's death that Ichihashi had buried her in sand, but it was actually a mixture of sand and compost soil, sprayed with a substance used to compact and decompose waste. It is believed that he planned to either bury the body in concrete or to wait until it had decomposed. Ichihashi had bought those materials over the course of six visits to his local hardware store in the hours leading up to the arrival of the police on 26 March.

Nova reported Hawker missing at 2:30 pm on 26 March after she failed to teach her classes scheduled for 25 and 26 March. Hawker's friends had tried to contact the police, but the message was not conveyed to the proper authorities within the department. Two officers were dispatched; they reached Ichihashi's apartment at 5:40 pm but were not permitted to knock without proper cause. The officers noticed somebody in the apartment even though no light was visible. They had been told of the previous allegation made against Ichihashi, and the officers called for back-up at 7:00 pm. Within the next hour, seven more officers arrived.

Two hours after the nine officers had assembled outside, Ichihashi left the apartment barefoot and wearing a rucksack. He was made aware of the situation and tried to run away from the officers. One officer grabbed his rucksack, but Ichihashi continued to flee. None of the officers had radios, so the officers on the fourth floor could not alert those on the ground. Ichihashi eluded the officers by vaulting the last few feet of the stairway to the ground, but he was later rediscovered wearing a pair of athletic shoes. He escaped again by zig-zagging through the street. The rucksack contained his gym clothes, which police believed he was going to wash at the gym.

== Investigation ==
Police suspect that between Sunday night and early Monday morning, Ichihashi had moved his bathtub from the bathroom to the balcony and put Hawker's body into it. Neighbours said they heard sounds of something striking metal and something being dragged during that time. On Tuesday, the police obtained an arrest warrant for Ichihashi on suspicion of abandoning Hawker's body; they put him on the nationwide wanted list. On 29 March, detectives removed a shopping trolley, in which Ichihashi is believed to have transported the bags of horticultural soil he used to bury Hawker, from his apartment building. That same day, twenty police officers raided Hotel Chateau—a love hotel near Nishi-Funabashi Station east of Tokyo—but did not find Ichihashi. Police released a new wanted poster of Ichihashi, which included an edited image of the suspect disguised as a woman. They also released images of the drawing he had made of Hawker, hoping that someone would recognize the drawing style.

In early 2008, police investigated sightings of Ichihashi among sections of Kabukicho popular with gay men, where he had tentatively been identified by his male sexual partners. However, in the latter part of the year, the investigation stalled. By October 2008, 140 officers were involved in the relatively large investigation. That month, the police suggested that Ichihashi may have committed suicide. Hawker's father called this a ploy to scale down the operation, which some inside sources said was coming to a close. Japanese police told neither the Hawker family nor the British Foreign and Commonwealth Office.

Reports speculating about Ichihashi's location continued, and on 15 January 2009 an article in Japan Today, citing a reporter from the weekly magazine Spa!, reported that Ichihashi had fled to the Philippines.

On 21 March 2009, on the run-up to the second anniversary of Hawker's death, the police released life-size cut-outs of Ichihashi to raise the profile of the case.

On 26 June 2009, the Japanese National Police Agency raised the cash reward for information leading to Ichihashi's arrest from ¥1 million to ¥10 million. The manner in which this reward would be distributed was questioned when Ichihashi was arrested later that year; several informants—including a cosmetic surgery clinic in Nagoya, an employee at an Osaka construction company where Ichihashi worked for fourteen months and an Osaka ferry company employee who reported sighting someone who resembled Ichihashi — contributed to his capture.

On 4 November 2009, police disclosed that Ichihashi had undergone plastic surgery on 24 October at a clinic in Nagoya, where he had his nose uplifted. He had failed to receive surgery in Fukuoka in mid-October. He had apparently received cosmetic surgery on several occasions to remove two moles on his cheek, add a fold to his eyelids, thin both lips and increase the height of his nose before he visited the Nagoya clinic. Police released to the press a photograph taken immediately before his latest surgery.

=== Arrest and trial ===
On 10 November 2009, Ichihashi was captured in Osaka while trying to board a ferry to Okinawa. Ichihashi did not confess upon being arrested, and when his 23-day period of detention without charge expired on 2 December, he was initially charged with abandoning a body, and served two more warrants for rape and murder. Ichihashi's lawyers alleged that he was threatened with the death penalty if he did not speak, and his reticence was attributed to fatigue and stress. On 23 December, one of his lawyers announced that he had acknowledged that he was involved in Hawker's death but he had not intended to kill her and had attempted artificial resuscitation.

Stephen Green, writing for The Japan Times, said that the case, which had been extensively covered by the media, was likely to test the fairness of Japan's judicial system—which operates a lay judge system and has the option of the death penalty in certain cases. However, it is extremely rare in Japan to be sentenced to death for killing only one person. As of 2010, fewer than ten of the 111 inmates of Japan's death row had killed only one person, including previous convictions.

In court, Ichihashi admitted to suffocating Hawker to prevent her from screaming for help while he raped her. On 21 July 2011, the Chiba District Court sentenced Ichihashi to life imprisonment for the murder of Hawker. The Hawker family had requested the death penalty, but the court felt the death penalty was inappropriate because Ichihashi had no previous convictions and because at the age of 32 there was still a chance he could be rehabilitated.

As of 2023, Ichihashi is serving his sentence in Nagano Prison according to an article on the Daily Shincho.

== Media coverage ==
During the investigation, Hawker's parents strove to keep their daughter's case on the media agenda. They appealed for information shortly after the murder, visited Japan three months later to renew attention, and visited again a year after her death, imploring the media to keep the case alive and for Ichihashi to turn himself in. Although Bill Hawker expressed dismay at the lack of information about Ichihashi's whereabouts, he said "we have not come here to criticize the Japanese police". Hawker's family returned again on the second anniversary of her death, and her father revisited the country a month after Ichihashi's arrest to express his gratitude.

Hawker's murder was repeatedly compared to the 2000 murder of British citizen Lucie Blackman, whose dismembered body was found buried in a shallow grave at a beach in Miura, Kanagawa in January 2001.

On 29 February 2008, ABC News aired a US documentary titled Vanished in Japan related to the deaths of Hawker and Blackman. In September 2008, BBC Radio 4 broadcast A Tokyo Murder by John Dryden and Miriam Smith, a three-part radio play which is loosely based on the Hawker case.

Ichihashi wrote a book titled Until I Was Arrested, which tells his side of the story. He offered Hawker's family all royalties his book might earn, which the family rejected. A film, I Am Ichihashi: Journal of a Murderer, starring Japanese actor Dean Fujioka, was released in November 2013, based on the book by Ichihashi, and covering the two and a half years he spent on the run before being arrested in November 2009.
