= Pure Japanese =

- Theatrical release poster Photograph by RK
- Directed by: Daishi Matsunaga
- Screenplay by: Tatsuo Kobayashi
- Produced by: Dean Fujioka; Hitoshi Endo; Shinji Ogawa; Shunsuke Koga; Masayoshi Jonai
- Starring: Dean Fujioka; Aju Makita; Tetsu Watanabe; Daichi Kaneko; Yukio Sakaguchi; Jun Murakami; Kyusaku Shimada; Tetsuya Bessho
- Cinematography: Takahiro Imai
- Edited by: Ryo Hayano
- Music by: Hiroko Sebu
- Production company: Thefool Inc.
- Distributed by: Amuse Inc.
- Release dates: January 28, 2022 (Japan); July 17, 2022 (Amazon Prime Video)
- Running time: 88 minutes
- Country: Japan
- Language: Japanese

Pure Japanese (Note: The original Japanese title is in English.) is a 2022 Japanese action film directed by Daishi Matsunaga and starring Dean Fujioka, Aju Makita and Tetsu Watanabe. It is also Fujioka's first created and produced film.

The plot revolves around Daisuke Tateishi (played by Fujioka), an eccentric man with limited social skills and a devotion to Japanese culture who handles sound effects for ninja shows despite his exceptional physical abilities. One day, he rescues a high school girl named Ayumi (Makita), but she and her grandfather Ryuzo (Watanabe) are under threat of eviction from their home by the local yakuza. Following Ryuzo's death, Ayumi seeks Tateishi's help, and he releases the violent impulses he had kept sealed away due to past trauma.

Pure Japanese emerged from Fujioka's decision to create and produce original video works after completing his role in the 2018 drama The Count of Monte Cristo: Great Revenge. Having engaged in entertainment activities overseas, he began to contemplate the question of "What defines Japanese people?" as he observed Japan from an objective standpoint. In response to this question, he formulated a hypothesis using the concepts of nihongo-bito (Japanese: 日本語人) (Note: Nihongo-bito is a word coined by Fujioka.) and "Japanese language operating system (OS)", resulting in a script centered around themes of violence and religion. The shooting took place in September 2020 in the Nikko region of Tochigi Prefecture, as well as at the Nikko Edomura theme park. The film underwent multiple rounds of re-editing and script changes for the purpose of elevating it to a more multi-layered narrative.

Pure Japanese was released in Japan on January 28, 2022, followed by a screening in the Nippon Visions section of the 22nd Nippon Connection Japanese Film Festival in Germany from May 24 to 29, 2022. It became available for streaming worldwide on Amazon Prime Video on July 17, 2022. The film garnered mixed reviews. The Japan Times remarked that it was "likely to be misunderstood".

== Plot ==
Daisuke Tateishi, a man employed at the Nikko Oedomura theme park, (Note: The film's Nikko Oedomura park (日光"大"江戸村) is fictional, although its name and characteristics are very similar to those of the Nikko Edomura park, where the film was partially shot.) has a secret daily routine of physical and spiritual training at a shinto shrine. He is an eccentric individual with limited social skills and a devotion to Japanese culture, causing people to keep their distance. Traumatized by a past accident on a film set where he was involved, Tateishi, despite his exceptional physical abilities, handles sound effects for ninja shows instead of performing action sequences.

A farewell party for Tateishi's colleague is held at a "snack bar". Ayumi, a high school girl who has lied about her age to be hired, works there. Also present in the snack bar are Jinnai, Saeki and other members of the local yakuza known as Nagayama-gumi. The yakuza are colluding with Kurosaki, a prefectural assembly member, in a plot to sell to a Chinese broker the land where Ayumi resides with her grandfather Ryuzo. The yakuza approach Ayumi, requesting her assistance in persuading Ryuzo.

Meanwhile, Saeki attempts to use a widely available tool called the "P(ure) J(apanese) kit" to measure the purity of Japanese people. However, his result turns out to be a mediocre 50%. He proceeds to force the nearby ninja actors to take the test as well, but Tateishi refuses. Later, Tateishi rescues Ayumi from getting entangled with Saeki, and one day she hands him a PJ kit. When he uses it at home, the number comes out as 100%.

Tateishi participates in the ninja show as a replacement for a former colleague. However, he fails miserably when Ayumi comes to watch the show. Due to his trauma, he has imposed limitations on violence, rendering him unable to perform.

As the harassment against Ayumi's home persists, Ryuzo gets injured and hospitalized. Tateishi reveals to Ayumi that Kurosaki is responsible. They storm into Kurosaki's office, but he feigns innocence. Overwhelmed by anger, Tateishi destroys the office, receiving affirmation from Ayumi for his violence for the first time.

However, the police arrive at the Oedomura park to question Tateishi regarding the destruction of Kurosaki's office. Additionally, rumors about his past reach his boss, resulting in his dismissal. Meanwhile, following Ryuzo's death, the yakuza make a forcible attempt to seize the land from Ayumi. Taking advantage of an opportunity, she escapes and seeks Tateishi's help. With heavy machinery being brought onto Ayumi's property and excavation starting forcibly, Tateishi storms in and releases the violent impulses he had suppressed until that moment.

== Cast ==
Cast list sourced from Cinema Today:

- Dean Fujioka as Daisuke Tateishi, an action actor
- Aju Makita as Ayumi, a high school girl
- Tetsu Watanabe as Ryuzo, Ayumi's grandfather
- Daichi Kaneko as Ninomiya, a swordplay actor at the Nikko Oedomura theme park
- Tsukasa Kuroiwa as a swordplay actor at the Nikko Oedomura theme park
- Shinpei Okita as the head of the swordplay troupe at the Nikko Oedomura theme park
- Hideto Washizu as a swordplay actor at the Nikko Oedomura theme park
- Ryutaro Ninomiya as Saeki, a member of the local yakuza Nagayama-gumi
- Long Mizuma as a Chinese land broker
- Kumi Kureshiro as a Chinese proprietress of a "snack bar"
- Haruki Takano as a member of the local yakuza Nagayama-gumi
- Bob Suzuki as a member of the local yakuza Nagayama-gumi
- Takayuki Suzuki as a member of the local yakuza Nagayama-gumi
- Yukio Sakaguchi as Jinnai, an executive of the local yakuza Nagayama-gumi
- Jun Murakami as Chida, an acquaintance of the head of the swordplay troupe
- Kyusaku Shimada as Suzuki, executive director of the Nikko Oedomura theme park
- Tetsuya Bessho as Kurosaki, a prefectural assembly member

== Production ==
=== Development ===
The inspiration for Pure Japanese came from Dean Fujioka's appearance in the 2018 drama The Count of Monte-Cristo: Great Revenge (Fuji Television). After the production of the drama ended, Fujioka found that he—a live individual—had been left behind in the bizarre energy vortex that had condensed during the filming process. After much thought about what he needed to do to move forward, he decided to create and produce original video works. Although many of his previous projects did not materialize, Pure Japanese was the first project that combined entertainment and economic viability, while also carrying a clear meaning of "why he created this for the world".

Having spent considerable time performing abroad at the beginning of his career, Fujioka only started working in Japan in 2011. As he had been observing Japan from an "objective" standpoint, the question "What defines Japanese people?" arose and led him to hypothesize that users of the "operating system (OS)" called the Japanese language are the nihongo-bito (日本語人), and that the Japanese language OS controls the thoughts and actions of the nihongo-bito. Furthermore, he delved into the thought that "if that OS is simply driving the human race to deliver 'Language OS DNAs' to the future, the question is 'where is this demigod-like language OS taking Japanese tribe to?'" Pure Japanese depicted this idea as a case study of Japanese language users with the theme of violence as one cultural feature.

Religion also soon became a prominent theme in Fujioka's approach. He invited director Daishi Matsunaga to read up on the relationship between religion and violence before commencing filming. Matsunaga explained it further in an interview with Rooftop:

For those who believe in their religious teachings, believing and fighting is a just cause. ... You are right that there are no overwhelmingly evil [people], and they are living their lives to the best of their ability within their positions. Even if someone is not serious, it is not a big deal; everyone insists on a fair argument, so that is where collisions and violence arise. That is why Tateishi's violence was also caused by Ayumi['s request], "I want you to kill these people." The point is that it became a fair argument only when there was a just cause that I wanted you to protect me. (Note: Original: その宗教の教えを信じている人にとっては、信じて戦うという事は大義名分なんです。 ... 圧倒的な悪が居ないというのはその通りで、その人の立場のなかで一生懸命に生きているんです。不真面目な人がいたとしてもそれほどたいしたことではなく、正論をみんな言っていてそこには衝突が起き暴力というものが起こってしまう。だから、立石の暴力もアユミから「この人たちを殺して欲しい。」要は私を守って欲しいという大義名分があったことで初めて正論になるんです。)

Additionally, the part of the plot in which the main character is being crushed by absurdity and he gives his life away like a sacrificial offering was the one Fujioka had envisioned from the beginning. Concurrently, he also desired more opportunities to showcase the stylistic beauty inherent in Japanese action film, and thus he made it one of his missions to shed light on the existence of action stars and stunt performers in the creation of this film.

Matsunaga spent a lot of time discussing his ideas with Fujioka, and together with Ogawa and screenwriter Tatsuo Kobayashi, they stayed overnight for around five days to write the script. Throughout this process, Matsunaga added his personal touch. According to an interview with Joshi Spa!, in creating the script, they placed great importance on a kind of "Japanese context" of how Japan turned into its present social structure. Thus, the notion of fusing several cultures—for example, by quoting Yukio Mishima, Yoshida Shōin, and Ludwig Wittgenstein—became more and more prevalent.

=== Casting ===
In July 2021, Fujioka and Aju Makita were announced as the principal cast members in the film. In an interview with Oricon, Fujioka spoke about his own casting: "It is in the sense that I used 'Dean Fujioka as an actor' in the realization of this film project." (Note: Original: 本作の企画を成立させるうえで、"役者としてのディーン・フジオカ"を使ってしまったという感覚です。) Also, about co-starring with Makita, he hoped for the relationship between Tateishi and Ayumi to be like Léon and Mathilda in the film Léon. In an interview with Fujiteleview!!, he answered that he was glad that she "infused this film with something like the echo of the soul [she had] at that time."

In October 2021, it was revealed that professional wrestler Yukio Sakaguchi, along with Tetsuya Bessho, Tetsu Watanabe, Daichi Kaneko, Jun Murakami, Kyusaku Shimada and others, had joined the cast. Regarding the use of Sakaguchi, Matsunaga thought that since Fujioka had built up his body for this film, it would be fitting for the actor playing the role of Jinnai to possess physical strength. In an interview with Rooftop, he said, "The visual impact a real [fighter] has, that 'this person's strength is true', is very convincing in images, so I felt that Sakaguchi-san could bring that out." (Note: Original: 本当にこの人は強いんだという本物がもつ視覚からの説得力は映像においてとても大きいので、それが坂口さんなら出ると思ったんです。) Fujioka also addressed the topic at the film's completion preview in January 2022, saying that Sakaguchi's appearance played a major role in the film's success.

=== Filming ===
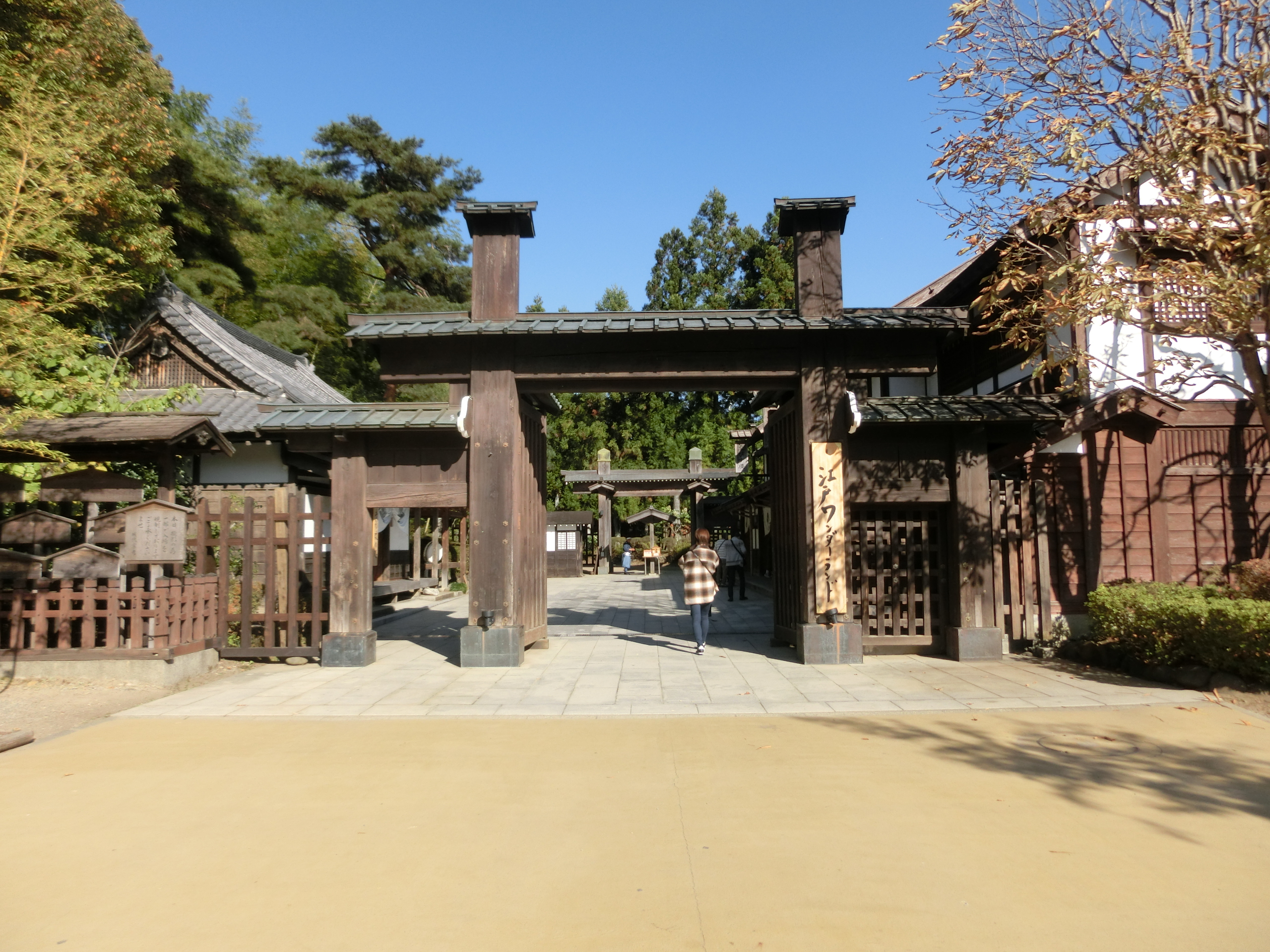
A view of the Nikko Edomura theme park, where part of the filming took place.

The shooting of the film took place in September 2020 in the Nikko region of Tochigi Prefecture, with some scenes filmed at the Nikko Edomura theme park. According to Fujioka, it was the best place where the lost or no longer existing past life and culture of Japan are artificially purified and displayed; for instance, a museum exhibits stuffed extinct animals. The theme park also hosts actual ninja shows, which is another reason the location was chosen.

In the four months leading up to the filming, Fujioka engaged in daily training sessions to increase his muscle mass in preparation for the role and the long action sequences it implied. Even throughout the filming period, he also dedicated himself to strength training during breaks.

About three months before the start of filming, Fujioka started rehearsing the action scenes because they differed significantly from the ninja shows in style. He created their basic flow at the action team's studio first. After going to Nikko, he practiced the choreography of the shows a few times with the actual ninja performers at the Nikko Edomura theme park.

At first, Fujioka and action choreographer Eiji Morisaki developed the climactic action scenes. However, due to minor alterations in the filming location on the day of filming, slight modifications were made to the action sequences. Fujioka had a strong desire for meticulous detail in the action scenes, but time constraints prevented the realization of an ideal schedule.

=== Post-production ===
During the post-production phase, Matsunaga and the engineers took the lead, while Fujioka, as the project's creator, oversaw the entire production. Considering how it would look not only to the nihongo-bito but also to those who are unfamiliar with the language or have no particular interest in Japan, the film underwent multiple rounds of re-editing, script changes and story rearrangements. Fujioka believed that as long as he could carry out his original intention, the expression could be changed if there was a better way to do it. While the script was of sufficient quality for filming the material, they persisted in elevating it to a more multi-layered narrative. This made the shooting script and the completed work totally different. They thought up Fujioka's English monologue after finishing editing. The production of this film took more than three years from conception to completion.

== Release ==
On March 26, 2021, the Film Classification and Rating Organization gave Pure Japanese a rating of "PG12" (parental guidance requested for young people under 12 years) for its Japanese release. The teaser and main visuals for the film, created by photographer RK, were unveiled on August 19 and October 7, 2021, respectively. After being distributed by Amuse Inc. and having its theatrical debut in Japan on January 28, 2022, the film was screened from May 24 to 29, 2022, in Germany as part of the Nippon Visions section of the 22nd Nippon Connection Japanese Film Festival. In addition, it became available for worldwide distribution on Amazon Prime Video on July 17, 2022.

=== Music ===
Pure Japanese: Original Soundtrack

Soundtrack album by Hiroko Sebu
- Released: March 23, 2022
- Length: 31:33
- Label: Pony Canyon (PCSP – 04089)

The soundtrack, composed by Hiroko Sebu, was released exclusively for digital distribution, containing all 16 tracks.

Pure Japanese Original Soundtrack
No.	Title	Length
1.	"Intro" (イントロ)	1:09
2.	"Japanese Sword" (刀)	0:44
3.	"Crested Ibis" (鴇)	0:31
4.	"Queen"	0:48
5.	"Shadow" (影)	0:28
6.	"Japanese Sword, Part 2" (刀、弐)	0:33
7.	"Mishima" (三島)	2:03
8.	"River" (リバー)	1:15
9.	"Laughing Man" (笑う男)	3:08
10.	"Seppuku" (切腹)	2:33
11.	"Hero" (ヒーロー)	2:52
12.	"Sword Battle" (殺陣)	2:36
13.	"Bloodshed" (血の雨)	3:27
14.	"Killing Each Other" (殺し合い)	3:33
15.	"Fireworks" (花火)	2:17
16.	"Pure Japanese: The End Title" (ピュア・ジャパニーズ: The End Title)	3:36
Total length:		31:33

=== Home media ===
The film was released on Blu-ray and DVD by Amuse Soft on November 16, 2022. Both formats include English subtitles and special features such as trailers and audio commentary. The Blu-ray, a deluxe edition, also offers some additional content, including the making of Pure Japanese, a video capturing the stage greeting to thank for the film's release and a photo book.

== Reception ==
James Hadfield of The Japan Times awarded the film three out of five stars, remarking that "Pure Japanese is likely to be misunderstood – all the more so, given that it's played totally straight", and analyzing it as "closer to the self-reflexive cinema that Takashi Miike and Sion Sono used to do so well, giving audiences a bit of the old ultra-violence while forcing them to question what they're watching". He praised its unexpected philosophical decorations as a film with big ideas, but also felt perplexed because it ended on a frustratingly ambivalent mood. Hideyuki Nakazawa, a reviewer from Cinema Today, also gave the film a three-star rating out of five. He felt that it "reeks of a dangerous cult" and took it as "a controversial work that reflects a Japanese man who seeks identity in the unscientific illusion of 'pure Japanese' and goes mad quietly, and a collapsing Japanese society". Another Cinema Today's film critic, Hibiki Kurei, shared a similar sentiment, awarding three stars out of five. He pointed out that Fujioka's "eccentric sense as a creator", who has previously directed I am Ichihashi: Journal of a Murderer, is "apparent at a glance since the modern ninja he plays is completely crazy with a disturbing aura akin to the mysterious man in [the film] The Man from the Sea". (Note: The Man from the Sea is a 2018 Japanese-French-Indonesian co-production film starring Fujioka.) Kurei described how, therefore, "the absurdity in which [Tateishi] tries to justify his way of life while looking like a world-saving hero explodes".

Don Anelli of Asian Movie Pulse thought the use of a traditional story setting by screenwriter Tatsuo Kobayashi "work[ed] incredibly well as a standalone effort", and praised the presence of a "series of fun brawls and confrontations that take place here which have a nice energy contained and come across nicely when Daisuke gains a fury and intensity to fight back". While he acknowledged some minor issues, such as the overly familiar development of Kobayashi's storyline and the film's low-budget qualities, he mentioned that it "has quite a lot of positive points to like about it which are only somewhat hindered by a minor set of flaws that may not even apply to most viewers".
