= Edo Wonderland Nikko Edomura =

Cultural theme park in Japan

Coordinates: 36°47′27.57″N 139°41′51.18″E

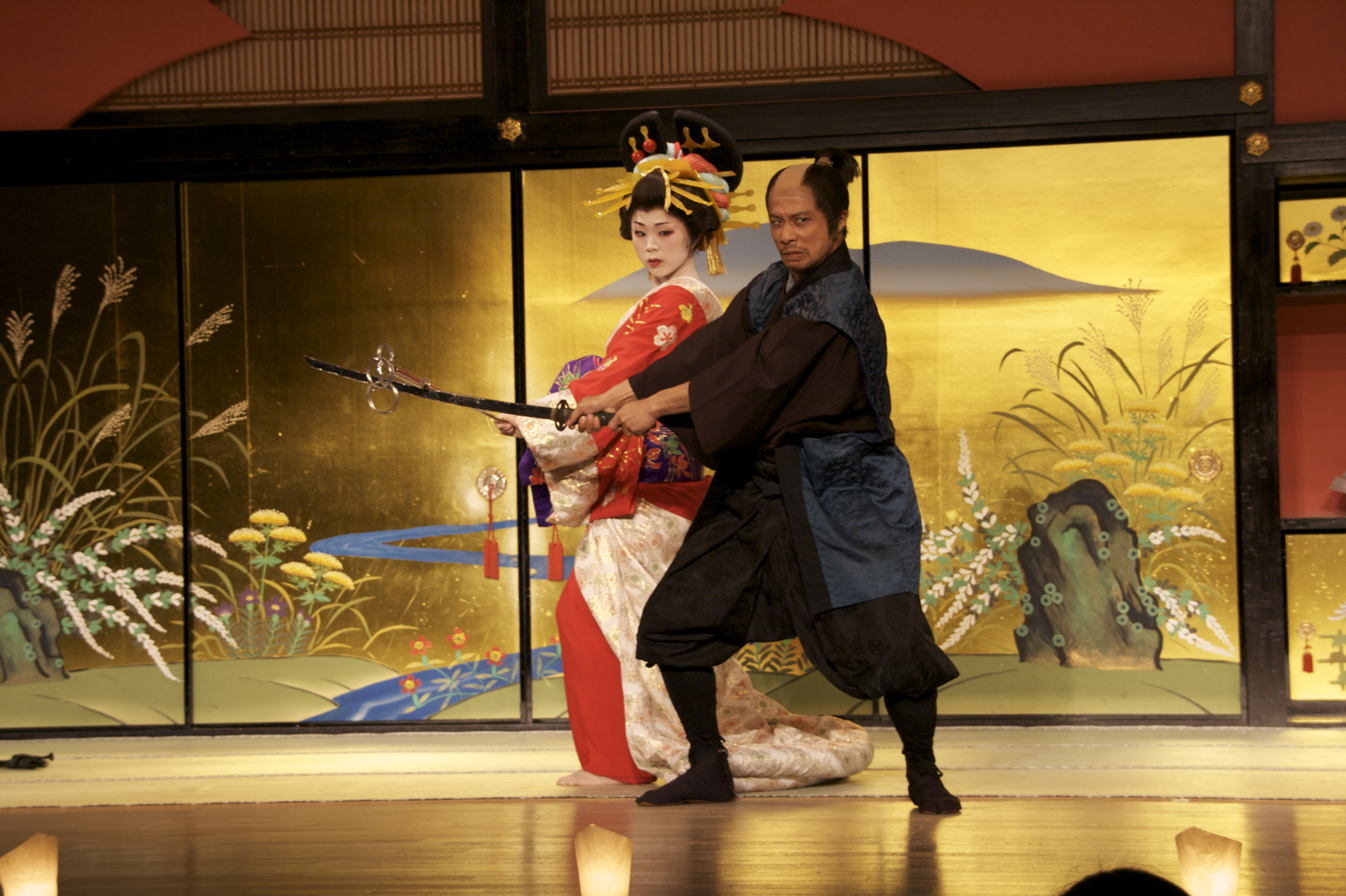
Oiran show in Edo Wonderland

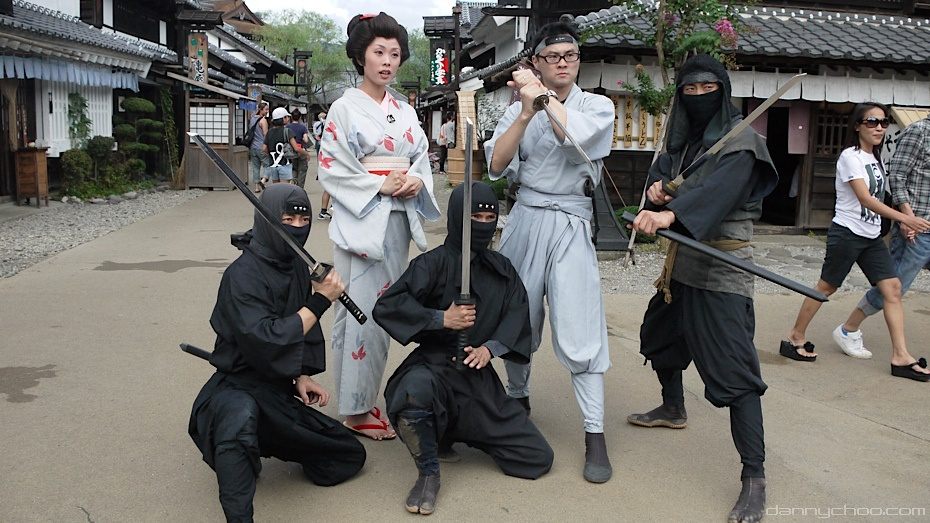
Ninja

Edo Wonderland Nikko Edomura (江戸ワンダーランド 日光江戸村, Edo Wandārando Nikkō Edomura) is a Japanese cultural theme park in the Kinugawa Onsen area of Nikkō, Tochigi. The park resurrects and showcases the life and culture of the Edo period.

Edo Wonderland spans a site area of 49.5 hectares (122 acres). The park's design is based on the Edo period's golden era known as Genroku. Edo Wonderland hosts a wide variety of Edo period architecture from rural lodgings to urban samurai residences and government buildings. It is populated by staff in Edo period attire, reenacting the speech and behaviour of Edo era citizens from lower, middle and upper classes. The park has seven theatres featuring traditionally themed shows including plays, ninja action and oiran shows combined with outdoor live shows, street performances, parades, seasonal festivals and special events. Edo Wonderland also has a range of visitor experiences for adults and children including ninja workshops, Japanese traditional archery and shuriken throwing.

You can dress up as an Edo Period character at Henshin Costume House then walk around in the costume and watch how the actors treat you as what you are dressed up as.

== History ==
Edo Wonderland was established on April 23, 1986, in Fujiwara-cho, Shioya-gun, Tochigi Prefecture, in what is now known as the Nikko Kinugawa district. Three more parks were constructed in Hokkaido, Kanazawa and Mie prefectures, but they were sold in the 2000s.

== Edo Wonderland Studio ==
Edo Wonderland contains film studios and a large open set often used for jidaigeki historical films and TV drama series, both domestic and international. The theme park itself, due to its unique atmosphere, is featured on domestic and international travel, culture and variety shows.

== Mascot ==
The mascot of Edo Wonderland is Nyanmage, a samurai cat. Its name is derived from "nyan" (the sound a cat makes in Japanese, equivalent to "meow" English) and "mage", the topknot hairstyle.

== Language support ==
As of 2014, printed park and timetable information is available in English, French, German, Thai, Korean, Russian, Simplified Chinese and Traditional Chinese. English speaking staff are available. Restaurant menus are available in English and Japanese.

== In popular culture ==
The park was used extensively during Downtown no Gaki no Tsukai ya Arahende!!'s 2012 New Year's Eve special.

On February 20, 2013- Visual Kei band 己龍(Kiryu) released their music video for 悦ト鬱(Etsu to Utsu). The music video was filmed in Nikko Edomura. (In the reference link provided below, their guitarist 九条武政 (Takemasa Kujou) states that this is where the music video was filmed.) Edo Wonderland's Studio 2's Castle Interior was used for the part of the music video that was filmed indoors.

The film Pure Japanese, starring Dean Fujioka, was released on January 28, 2022. The film revolves around an action actor who works at a theme park with a very similar name (Nikko Oedomura); Pure Japanese was partially shot at Nikko Edomura park in September 2020.
