= Orang Ikan =

2024 film by Mike Wiluan

- Directed by: Mike Wiluan
- Written by: Mike Wiluan
- Produced by: Eric Khoo; James Khoo; Fumie Suzuki Lancaster; Ninin Musa; Fong Cheng Tan; Darryl Yeo; Freddie Yeo
- Starring: Dean Fujioka; Callum Woodhouse
- Cinematography: Asep Kalila
- Edited by: Lim Yen
- Music by: Akihiko Matsumoto
- Production companies: Gorylah Pictures; Zhao Wei Films; Infinite Studios
- Distributed by: SC Films International; Shudder
- Release date: 2024
- Running time: 83 minutes
- Countries: Singapore; Indonesia; Japan; United Kingdom
- Languages: English; Japanese

Orang Ikan (transl. Fish People) (also known as Monster Island) is a 2024 historical horror film directed by Mike Wiluan. The film stars Dean Fujioka as Saito and Callum Woodhouse as Bronson, two opposing World War II soldiers who wash ashore a Pacific island and encounter the Orang Ikan, a Malay mythological creature. The film premiered at the 37th Tokyo International Film Festival and was distributed by Shudder.

== Plot ==
In 1942 during World War II, a Japanese hell ship transporting prisoners of war, including a Japanese soldier accused of treason, Saito, and a British POW, Bronson, is attacked and sunk by an Allied submarine. During the attack, the chained Saito and Bronson escape and reach an island in the Pacific Ocean. They fight before realising they are being watched by a creature in the ocean. After breaking their chains, they search for crabs, but two Japanese soldiers arrive and interrogate Saito. The Malay mythological creature Orang Ikan attacks and kills the soldiers, forcing Saito and Bronson to flee separately through the forest. Saito discovers a wrecked Japanese fighter aircraft containing a dead pilot and a male Orang Ikan. After reuniting, Saito and Bronson find an Orang Ikan baby in a cave. Its mother arrives and attacks them. Bronson, attempting to destroy the cave with a bomb salvaged from the aircraft, is impaled by the creature. Saito shoots the baby, causing the mother to leave Bronson and attend to it. Bronson orders Saito to leave before detonating the bomb in a suicide attack. The Orang Ikan survives and pursues Saito, who uses a Japanese soldier's corpse as bait before attacking it with his katana. Although he can stab the creature in the heart, Saito chooses to spare it and retreats into the forest. He is later rescued by the United States Navy.

== Cast ==
- Dean Fujioka as Saito
- Callum Woodhouse as Bronson
- Alan Maxson as Orang Ikan
- Alexandra Gottardo
- Lucky Moniaga as Orang Melayu
- Kazushi Kato as Hell Ship Commander
- Teruhiko Kameoka as Hell Ship Soldier #1
- Yorihiro Nagai as Hell Ship Soldier #2
- Naoki Kawano as Hell Ship Soldier #3
- James Edgar Langdong as US Navy Officer
- Kôji Miyoshi as Japanese NCO

== Production ==
=== Development and writing ===
The film received support from the Singapore Film Commission (SFC). While researching Malay folklore, Wiluan found reports of the Orang Ikan by soldiers during World War II in the Indonesian Kai Islands. Creature from the Black Lagoon, Hell in the Pacific, Alien, Predator, and Island of the Fishmen have been cited by Wiluan and Khoo as influences on the film. Wiluan stated that the film's underlying theme was about humanity and "how humans can destroy something they don't understand." The script also contains themes of colonialism, war, and healing historical wounds. American creature designer Allan Holt worked on the design of the titular creature, utilizing prosthetics and practical effects. The creature's suit was built with a specialized cooling system and animatronic components.

=== Filming and post-production ===
Production began in October 2023. The film's production crew was largely from Indonesia, but also included people from Japan, Singapore, and the United Kingdom. The film's ship sequences were shot at Infinite Studios in Batam, Indonesia. The outdoor scenes were shot in Sukabumi and Ciletuh-Palabuhanratu Geopark. To create a blend of fiction and history, Wiluan utilized real historical footage of the Asia–Pacific War in the film. The film was produced by Infinite Studios, Gorylah Pictures, and Zhao Wei Films.

== Release ==
SC Films International acquired the film's rights in September 2023. The film premiered at the 37th Tokyo International Film Festival. The film's official trailer was released in October 2024. The film was screened at the 2024 Trieste Science+Fiction Festival and the 35th Singapore International Film Festival in December 2024. The film was shown at the Neuchâtel International Fantastic Film Festival and Overlook Film Festival in 2025. In April 2025, Shudder acquired the film for release in North America, UK, Ireland, Australia and New Zealand. A second trailer was released in June 2025. The film was released at CGV cinemas in Indonesia in July 11, 2025. The film was released on the Shudder streaming service on July 25, 2025.

== Reception ==
On review aggregation website Rotten Tomatoes, the film received an approval rating of 63% based on 16 reviews.
