= Tetsu Watanabe =

Japanese actor (born 1950)

- 渡辺 哲
- Born: 11 March 1950 (age 76); Tokoname, Aichi, Japan
- Occupation: Actor
- Years active: 1989 - present

Tetsu Watanabe (渡辺 哲, Watanabe Tetsu; born 11 March 1950) is a Japanese actor. He has appeared in more than 90 films since 1989.

== Selected filmography ==
=== Film ===
Year	Title	Role	Notes	Ref.
1985	Ran			
1993	Sonatine	Uechi		
1996	Sleeping Man	Daigo		
1997	Hana-bi	Tesuka		
1999	Nichiyobi wa Owaranai			
2002	The Cat Returns	Muta / Renaldo Moon		
2002	Tomie: Forbidden Fruit	Suzuki		
2005	Takeshis'	TV wardrobe master/noodle cook/audition actor		
2010	Railways	Takahashi		
2010	Cold Fish	Takayasu TsuTsui		
2011	Himizu	Shozo		
2016	Shin Godzilla	Deputy Chief Cabinet Secretary for Crisis Management		
2018	Darc	Ginzo Kageyama	American film	
2018	Life in Overtime			
2018	Shino Can't Say Her Name			
2020	Stardust Over the Town			
2020	Enter the Fat Dragon	Grandfather	Hong Kong film	
2021	Janitor			
2021	Pretenders			
2021	Prisoners of the Ghostland	Grandfather	American film	
2021	Red Post on Escher Street			
2022	Pure Japanese	Ryuzo		
2023	Tea Friends	Shigeo Tokioka		
2023	Baby Assassins: 2 Babies	Mr. Matsumoto		
2023	Kamaishi Ramen Monogatari			
2024	Horizon			
2024	This Man			
2024	Okite			
2024	Bibalam			
2025	Snowflowers: Seeds of Hope			
2025	River Returns			
2025	Yuko Side B, and Hereafter			
2025	Silent Night			
2026	The Busiest Actor on Earth	Himself		
2026	Hyoketsu			
TBA	Okaeri My Dear Fool		Lead role	

=== Television ===
Year	Title	Role	Notes	Ref.
1991	Taiheiki	Akamatsu Enshin	Taiga drama	
2010	General Rouge no Gaisen			
2011	Inu o Kau to Iu Koto			
2012	Hayami-san to Yobareru Hi			
2017	Naotora: The Lady Warlord	Ōkubo Tadayo	Taiga drama	
2021	Reach Beyond the Blue Sky	Kakubei	Taiga drama	
2024	Sunny	Reiji		
