= Produce 101 Japan Shinsekai =

- Season 4
- Season 4 logo
- Native name
- Katakana: プロデュースワンオーワンジャパン新世界
Transcriptions
- Romanization: Purodyūsu Wanōwan Japan Shinsekai
- Presented by: Dean Fujioka; Choi Soo-young
- Judges: Kevin Woo; Kaname Kawabata; Rino Nakasone; Kaita; Yuto Adachi
- No. of contestants: 123
- Winner: KO1KEYZ
- Location: Japan (mainly), South Korea (some episode)
- No. of episodes: 11

Release
- Original network: Lemino; Mnet; Nippon TV (finale only)
- Original release: March 26 – June 6, 2026

Season chronology
- ← Previous; Season 3 (The Girls)

Produce 101 Japan Shinsekai (プロデュースワンオーワンジャパン新世界; stylized in all caps) is the fourth season of the reality competition show Produce 101 Japan, the Japanese version of Produce 101. The show brings together 123 contestants with the intention of producing a permanent twelve-member boy group. It premiered on March 26, 2026, broadcasting in Japan via Lemino every Thursday at 21:00 JST (GMT+9) and concurrently globally via Mnet. The show concluded on June 6, finalizing the 12 debut members of KO1KEYZ.

The series is an official spin-off of the South Korean television series Produce 101 and is a co-production between Yoshimoto Kogyo and CJ E&M.

== Promotion and broadcast ==
On July 16, 2025, the Produce 101 Japan social media accounts posted a teaser hinting a new season of the show. The next day, the new season was announced as a global audition for a new boy group. Applications opened on July 17, 2025, with an initial deadline of September 4, 2025. However, due to technical issues and the high traffic as the audition period was nearing its end, the deadline was extended to September 7, 2025.

On January 23, 2026, Nakasone Rino, Kevin Woo, and Kaita were revealed as trainers. Adachi Yuto and Kawabata Kaname were also revealed the following day. On January 30, the first forty trainees were revealed. Forty-three more trainees were revealed the next day. On February 1, a twist called "101 Pass" was announced: thirty-eight "trainee candidates" were revealed, meaning twenty of them had to be cut to fit the show's 101 format. National producers and Sekai producers could vote their favorite 11 candidates out of those thirty-eight every day from February 2 to 4 using their d account or on the Mnet Plus app. The 20 least-voted trainee candidates were eliminated before the show started. To help fans decide, introduction videos for the trainee candidates were uploaded to the official Produce 101 Japan YouTube channel. On February 3, 1-minute PR videos for all 121 participants were uploaded.

On February 11, Dean Fujioka was announced as the season's national producer representative. In addition, audience recruitment for the first on-site evaluation opened. On the following day, Korean celebrity Choi Sooyoung was revealed as the season's sekai producer representative, a new role in the series. On February 19, the theme song "Shinsekai" was released digitally, alongside the performance video featuring the 101 trainees. Fancams of the full trainees except Hori Eito were uploaded on February 22. On the same day, it was announced that Hori Eito and Sakurai Hikaru had left the show due to personal reasons. Their profiles on the website and PR videos on YouTube were removed.

On March 24, two days before the season premiere, the nineteen trainees chosen for 101 Pass were revealed, solidifying the cast of 101 trainees.

== Cast ==
The show is presented by Dean Fujioka as the National Producer Representative and Choi Soo-young as the Sekai Producer Representative.

Vocal trainers

- Kevin Woo
- Kaname Kawabata

Dance trainers

- Rino Nakasone
- Kaita

Rap trainer

- Yuto Adachi

== Contestants ==
There were a total of 123 contestants involved with the show, but only 101 contestants were allowed to continue past the Level Placement Test. Contestants that left the show or were eliminated in the "101 Pass" elimination round were delisted from the official website prior to the show's premiere. The English names of all the contestants are presented in accordance with the official website.

Color key

Final debut members of KO1KEYZ
Contestants eliminated in the finale
Contestants eliminated in the third elimination round
Contestants eliminated in the second elimination round
Contestants eliminated in the first elimination round
Contestants eliminated in the 101 Pass elimination round
Contestants left the show

123 Contestants
Kato Daiki (加藤 大樹)	Yada Yoshiki (矢田 佳暉)	Park Si-young (パク・シヨン)	Oh Shin-haeng (オ・シンヘン)	Goto Yuki (後藤 結)
Yanagiya Issa (柳谷 伊冴)	Ono Keito (小野 慶人)	Abe Yura (安部 结蘭)	Iizuka Ryoga (飯塚 亮賀)	Sugiyama Ryuji (杉山 竜司)
Terui Kosuke (照井 康祐)	Hamada Towa (濱田 永遠)	Chen Rickey (チェン・リッキー)	Tsuchida Osuke (土田 央修)	Kumabe Takuto (熊部 拓斗)
Kurahashi Goten (倉橋 吾槙)	Yoo Hyeon-seung (ユ・ヒョンスン)	Okada Yuma (岡田 侑磨)	Adam Nagai (アダム・ナガイ)	Koshimizu Ren (小清水 蓮)
Aonuma Koshiro (青沼 昂史朗)	Kobayashi Chisato (小林 千悟)	Tanaka Maki (田中 蒔)	Imae Rikuto (今江 陸斗)	Yokoyama Kaname (横山 奏夢)
Asaka Kotaro (浅香 孝太郎)	Yamashita Shu (山下 柊)	Yoon Jae-yong (ユン・ジェヨン)	Ishida Ryota (石田 亮太)	Lee Hyun-jae (イ・ヒョンジェ)
Ogasawara Giuseppe Kei (小笠原 ジュゼッペ 慧)	Obayashi Yusei (大林 悠成)	Shinogaya Ayumu (篠ヶ谷 歩夢)	Liu Kaichi (リュウ・カイチ)	Kenmotsu Kinari (釼持 吉成)
Archer Uy (アーチャー・ウイ)	Matsuda Taiga (松田 太雅)	Itakura Yuta (板倉 悠太)	Kwak Dong-min (カク・ドンミン)	Li Weize (リー・ウェイゼ)
Nishizaki Shu (西﨑 柊)	Fujimaki Taiga (藤牧 大雅)	Chuang Jay (ジュアン・ジェイ)	Kaneyasu Junsei (金安 純正)	Uno Kaimu (宇野 海夢)
Ohse Rinto (大瀬 凜和)	Sawai Sena (澤井 星名)	Minamihira Tatsuya (南平 達矢)	Takahashi Sora (髙橋 空良)	Mori Mei (森 明育)
Horino Ren (堀野 蓮)	Maruo Jinichiro (丸尾 尋一郎)	Hirashima Hikaru (平島 輝)	Yohan Emmanuel (ヨハン・エマニュエル)	Horio Hijiri (堀尾 聖)
Honjo Akira (本荘 晃)	Kaneda Eito (金田 栄都)	Okamoto Takuto (岡本 拓士)	Takaya Kyohei (髙谷 京平)	Iwaki Shinji (岩城 慎二)
Sato Sora (佐藤 碧空)	Sakurai Fuma (櫻井 楓真)	Miyazato Takuto (宮里 拓利)	Nakamaru Aju (中丸 晏寿)	Kamimoto Riku (神元 理丘)
Ichikawa Daiki (市川 大輝)	Nishida Soshi (西田 颯梓)	Sano Yusei (佐野 由征)	Kurosaki Kanta (黒﨑 貫汰)	Takagi Haruto (髙城 暖人)
Katsuki Seita (香月 誠太)	Mizugami Rui (水上 琉偉)	Masuda Tomoki (増田 倫希)	Aguinaldo Tristan James (アギナルド・トリスタン・ジェームス)	Kawai Kosei (河合 晃誠)
Zukeran Hiroto (瑞慶覧 太都)	Okada Hyugo (岡田 彪吾)	Fujiyoshi Tokiya (藤芳 辰弥)	Yamane Musashi (山根 武蔵)	Kobayashi Rento (小林 蓮翔)
Aom Suungkavathin (オム・スアンカワーテン)	Kitabayashi Tetora (北林 天虎)	Tono Sota (東野 蒼汰)	Matsuda Sogo (松田 颯吾)	Tabi Kanade (多比 奏聖)
Miyazaki Shinsuke (宮崎 真佑)	Muramatsu Haruku (村松 遼空)	Ko Keishin (黄 敬眞)	Suekawa Eita (末川 瑛太)	Kanakura Takumi (金倉 拓未)
Okado Ryuga (岡戸 竜芽)	Nishiyama Kento (西山 賢人)	Shin Jung-uk (シン・ジョンウク)	Kojima Ayumu (児島 歩夢)	Seki Keijiro (関 敬次郎)
Morii Teru (森井 輝)	Hatoba Rikuto (鳩場 陸人)	Kai Rikuya (甲斐 陸也)	Kawabe Joe (河邊 晟)	Takamatsu Keisuke (髙松 敬祐)
Ueno Rui (上野 琉偉)	Kawamura Hakuto (川村 珀斗)	Sagawa Hirokazu (佐川 太一)	Abe Itsuki (阿部 樹)	Lee Joong-hoon (イ・ジュンフン)
Ozawa Koshin (小澤 昂心)	Kobayashi Kou (小林 廣)	Michael Minh Mccaffrey (マイケル ミン・マカフリ)	Patrick Phan Le (パトリック ファン・レ)	Kasahara Ren (笠原 蓮)
Eguchi Rento (江口 蓮翔)	Ochiai Rio (落合 利温)	Koyauchi Ruka (小谷内 瑠嘉)	Saito Sei (齊藤 惺)	Fujimoto Shinsei (藤本 真成)
Iida Shuma (飯田 柊馬)	Osawa Yugo (大澤 佑冴)	Fujii Yusei (藤井 雄聖)	Okamoto Yuto (岡本 佑斗)	Hori Eito (保里 瑛都)
Sakurai Hikaru (櫻井 輝)	Unknown	Unknown		

== Rankings ==
=== Top 12 ===
The top 12 contestants, calculated through a weighted system of 70% National votes and 30% Sekai votes are chosen through popularity with online voting and audience live voting. National Producers vote through Lemino and can receive an additional vote per day by downloading the Lemino app, while Sekai Producers vote through Mnet Plus. The results were shown at the end of each episode.

Color key

New Top 12 (Note: Indicates contestants who had never placed in the Top 12 in any prior elimination rounds or ranking announcements.)
Returned to Top 12 (Note: Indicates contestants who had placed in the Top 12 in a prior elimination round or ranking announcement, then had placed out of it, and then had come back)

List of Top 12 Contestants
#	Ep. 2	Ep. 3	Ep. 5	Ep. 6	Ep. 8	Ep. 10	Ep. 11
1	Yada Yoshiki	Kenmotsu Kinari (▲1)	Kato Daiki (▲1)	Kato Daiki	Kato Daiki	Oh Shin-haeng (▲6)	Kato Daiki (▲9)
2	Kenmotsu Kinari	Kato Daiki (▲1)	Kenmotsu Kinari (▼1)	Terui Kosuke (▲5)	Abe Yura (▲2)	Abe Yura	Yada Yoshiki (▲1)
3	Kato Daiki	Yada Yoshiki (▼2)	Abe Yura (▲1)	Kenmotsu Kinari (▼1)	Terui Kosuke (▼1)	Yada Yoshiki (▲2)	Park Si-young (▲3)
4	Abe Yura	Abe Yura	Yada Yoshiki (▼1)	Abe Yura (▼1)	Kenmotsu Kinari (▼1)	Terui Kosuke (▼1)	Oh Shin-haeng (▼3)
5	Park Si-young	Park Si-young	Oh Shin-haeng (▲1)	Park Si-young (▲1)	Yada Yoshiki (▲1)	Iizuka Ryoga (▲3)	Goto Yuki (▲4)
6	Oh Shin-haeng	Oh Shin-haeng	Park Si-young (▼1)	Yada Yoshiki (▼2)	Park Si-young (▼1)	Park Si-young	Yanagiya Issa (▲2)
7	Adam Nagai	Adam Nagai	Terui Kosuke (▲1)	Oh Shin-haeng (▼2)	Oh Shin-haeng	Chen Rickey (▲6)	Ono Keito (▲8)
8	Koshimizu Ren	Terui Kosuke (▲1)	Yoo Hyeon-seung (▲2)	Yoo Hyeon-seung	Iizuka Ryoga (▲4)	Yanagiya Issa (▲3)	Abe Yura (▼6)
9	Terui Kosuke	Kumabe Takuto (▲3)	Kumabe Takuto	Yanagiya Issa (▲10)	Yoo Hyeon-seung (▼1)	Goto Yuki (▲7)	Iizuka Ryoga (▼4)
10	Iizuka Ryoga	Yoo Hyeon-seung (▲5)	Adam Nagai (▼3)	Tsuchida Osuke (▲3)	Sugiyama Ryuji (▲1)	Kato Daiki (▼9)	Sugiyama Ryuji (▲2)
11	Kurahashi Goten	Iizuka Ryoga (▼1)	Kurahashi Goten (▲2)	Sugiyama Ryuji (▲12)	Yanagiya Issa (▼2)	Kumabe Takuto (▲4)	Terui Kosuke (▼7)
12	Kumabe Takuto	Koshimizu Ren (▼4)	Iizuka Ryoga (▼1)	Iizuka Ryoga	Tsuchida Osuke (▼2)	Sugiyama Ryuji (▼2)	Hamada Towa (▲2)

=== Global Ranker ===
The Global Ranker, calculated through a weighted system of 30% National votes and 70% Sekai votes, was announced at the end of each voting period. If a contestant ranked in the top 12 of the Global Ranker, they would continue onto to the next round even if they would have been eliminated.

In the first two voting periods, no eliminated contestants ranked in the top 12. In the third voting period, two eliminated contestants ranked in the top 12, allowing them to continue onto the next round.

Color key

Saved

List of Top 12 Contestants
#	Ep. 5	Ep. 8	Ep. 10	Ep. 11
1	Yada Yoshiki	Yada Yoshiki	Yada Yoshiki	Yada Yoshiki
2	Kato Daiki	Kato Daiki	Kobayashi Chisato	Oh Shin-haeng
3	Abe Yura	Abe Yura	Abe Yura	Kato Daiki
4	Park Si-young	Kenmotsu Kinari	Oh Shin-haeng	Park Si-young
5	Oh Shin-haeng	Park Si-young	Park Si-young	Ono Keito
6	Kenmotsu Kinari	Oh Shin-haeng	Terui Kosuke	Sugiyama Ryuji
7	Yoo Hyeon-seung	Terui Kosuke	Aonuma Koshiro	Abe Yura
8	Adam Nagai	Yoo Hyeon-seung	Kato Daiki	Iizuka Ryoga
9	Koshimizu Ren	Hamada Towa	Iizuka Ryoga	Terui Kosuke
10	Terui Kosuke	Koshimizu Ren	Koshimizu Ren	Goto Yuki
11	Hamada Towa	Aonuma Koshiro	Yoo Hyeon-seung	Yoo Hyeon-seung
12	Kumabe Takuto	Tsuchida Osuke	Goto Yuki	Yanagiya Issa

=== 1st Voting Period ===
The first voting period took place from March 26, 2026, at 23:45 JST (GMT+9), to April 17 at 4:00 JST. Producers were allowed to vote for twelve contestants per day. The top 50 contestants who received the most points would continue onto the next round while the remaining 51 trainees would be eliminated.

Color key

Top 12

1st Voting Period (Episode 5)
Rank	Contestants	Points				Rank	Contestants	Points			
Rank	Contestants	Votes		On-Site Votes	Total (Note: Points were calculated using this formula: (Number of National Votes) + (Number of Sekai Votes) + (On-site votes including any bonus points from winning benefits))	Rank	Contestants	Votes		On-Site Votes	Total
Rank	Contestants	National	Sekai	On-Site Votes	Total	Rank	Contestants	National	Sekai	On-Site Votes	Total
1	Kato Daiki	1,296,479	488,603	409	1,785,492	26	Aonuma Koshiro	384,186	203,900	361	588,448
2	Kenmotsu Kinari	1,372,025	392,007	345	1,764,377	27	Kobayashi Chisato	342,390	232,804	3,475	578,670
3	Abe Yura	1,051,560	501,072	422	1,553,054	28	Ogasawara Giuseppe Kei	413,742	149,834	400	563,977
4	Yada Yoshiki	939,786	590,728	419	1,530,933	29	Itakura Yuta	402,896	156,487	349	559,733
5	Oh Shin-haeng	939,330	472,529	327	1,412,187	30	Tanaka Maki	454,479	73,019	3,608	531,106
6	Park Si-young	897,732	513,636	416	1,411,784	31	Imae Rikuto	410,634	48,771	3,442	462,848
7	Terui Kosuke	981,058	209,766	3,566	1,194,391	32	Shinogaya Ayumu	307,665	135,249	3,416	446,330
8	Yoo Hyeon-seung	634,710	426,353	451	1,061,514	33	Yoon Jae-yong	224,307	197,307	402	422,017
9	Kumabe Takuto	904,298	147,917	3,446	1,055,661	34	Yamashita Shu	251,103	156,737	2,710	410,550
10	Adam Nagai	749,512	298,131	306	1,047,949	35	Matsuda Taiga	209,257	194,627	2,378	406,263
11	Kurahashi Goten	804,763	120,893	3,565	929,221	36	Fujimaki Taiga	274,222	102,710	326	377,259
12	Iizuka Ryoga	783,434	142,348	413	926,196	37	Kwak Dong-min	259,411	113,469	3,430	376,311
13	Tsuchida Osuke	714,427	166,755	2,404	883,587	38	Ishida Ryota	285,753	35,288	3,400	324,441
14	Koshimizu Ren	565,502	297,370	3,466	866,339	39	Okada Yuma	237,995	63,227	315	301,538
15	Hamada Towa	515,483	268,686	374	784,543	40	Sawai Sena	235,534	56,097	304	291,936
16	Ono Keito	577,221	193,555	410	771,187	41	Minamihira Tatsuya	210,577	60,123	343	271,044
17	Goto Yuki	493,758	180,964	2,402	677,125	42	Takahashi Sora	200,773	64,374	3,442	268,589
18	Asaka Kotaro	485,986	188,343	288	674,618	43	Liu Kaichi	199,855	57,688	3,444	260,987
19	Yanagiya Issa	554,421	93,744	3,510	651,675	44	Li Weize	133,326	120,464	3,434	257,224
20	Lee Hyun-jae	491,405	152,334	317	644,057	45	Mori Mei	211,739	40,894	278	252,911
21	Yokoyama Kaname	489,111	147,710	3,473	640,295	46	Ohse Rinto	198,103	48,609	3,479	250,191
22	Archer Uy	418,956	215,873	230	635,060	47	Chuang Jay	146,040	103,620	236	249,896
23	Sugiyama Ryuji	517,442	107,469	2,450	627,362	48	Uno Kaimu	215,997	30,000	2,721	248,719
24	Obayashi Yusei	491,658	123,081	3,447	618,187	49	Nishizaki Shu	178,864	66,133	3,419	248,417
25	Chen Rickey	480,239	116,014	241	596,495	50	Kaneyasu Junsei	203,906	31,643	3,417	238,966

=== 2nd Voting Period ===
The second voting period took place from April 23, 2026, immediately after the first voting period's results announcement, to May 8 at 12:00 JST. Producers were allowed to vote for twelve contestants per day. The top 35 contestants who received the most points would continue onto the next round while the remaining 15 trainees would be eliminated.

Color key

Top 12

2nd Voting Period (Episode 8)
Rank	Contestants	Points				Rank	Contestants	Points			
Rank	Contestants	Votes		On-Site Votes	Total	Rank	Contestants	Votes		On-Site Votes	Total
Rank	Contestants	National	Sekai	On-Site Votes	Total	Rank	Contestants	National	Sekai	On-Site Votes	Total
1	Kato Daiki	1,146,156	517,550	10,398	1,674,104	19	Aonuma Koshiro	439,858	366,617	356	806,831
2	Abe Yura	1,028,801	538,718	50,384	1,617,904	20	Koshimizu Ren	361,952	427,809	262	790,024
3	Terui Kosuke	1,240,023	340,771	10,418	1,591,213	21	Adam Nagai	528,431	242,254	10,365	781,051
4	Kenmotsu Kinari	1,045,520	484,313	10,388	1,540,221	22	Yamashita Shu	493,081	232,878	405	726,364
5	Yada Yoshiki	880,055	588,754	302	1,469,111	23	Yokoyama Kaname	519,064	179,861	352	699,278
6	Park Si-young	923,286	506,079	380	1,429,746	24	Lee Hyun-jae	537,611	144,126	10,388	692,125
7	Oh Shin-haeng	870,135	443,837	395	1,314,368	25	Yoon Jae-yong	458,905	217,900	10,433	687,239
8	Iizuka Ryoga	889,505	231,443	303	1,121,251	26	Kobayashi Chisato	247,892	376,913	50,327	675,133
9	Yoo Hyeon-seung	713,383	393,432	415	1,107,230	27	Obayashi Yusei	518,578	141,270	10,426	670,275
10	Sugiyama Ryuji	876,385	218,560	380	1,095,325	28	Kurahashi Goten	504,118	158,540	315	662,973
11	Yanagiya Issa	897,550	175,217	342	1,073,109	29	Ogasawara Giuseppe Kei	463,370	167,013	390	630,774
12	Tsuchida Osuke	776,690	292,015	351	1,069,057	30	Ishida Ryota	411,066	151,893	50,350	613,310
13	Chen Rickey	869,006	114,547	50,394	1,033,947	31	Liu Kaichi	479,797	125,347	339	605,483
14	Hamada Towa	599,161	392,724	10,394	1,002,279	32	Okada Yuma	467,238	126,329	369	593,937
15	Kumabe Takuto	714,472	152,387	345	867,204	33	Shinogaya Ayumu	328,398	219,610	284	548,293
16	Goto Yuki	660,696	199,470	336	860,502	34	Tanaka Maki	454,276	93,291	288	547,856
17	Asaka Kotaro	589,934	166,196	60,402	816,533	35	Imae Rikuto	468,774	74,999	341	544,114
18	Ono Keito	638,558	169,107	249	807,915	–	—N/a				

=== 3rd Voting Period ===
The third voting period took place from May 14, 2026, immediately after the second voting period's results announcement, to May 22 at 16:00 JST. Producers were allowed to vote for two contestants per day. The top 20 contestants who received the most points would continue onto the next round while the remaining 15 trainees would be eliminated. Two eliminated contestants ranked in the top 12 of the Global Ranker, totaling the number of surviving contestants to 22.

Color key

Top 12
Saved

3rd Voting Period (Episode 10)
Rank	Contestants	Points				Rank	Contestants	Points			
Rank	Contestants	Votes		On-Site Votes	Total	Rank	Contestants	Votes		On-Site Votes	Total
Rank	Contestants	National	Sekai	On-Site Votes	Total	Rank	Contestants	National	Sekai	On-Site Votes	Total
1	Oh Shin-haeng	125,315	89,780	100,032	315,128	12	Sugiyama Ryuji	143,840	50,154	9	194,003
2	Abe Yura	201,685	88,061	20,013	309,760	13	Tsuchida Osuke	138,751	46,381	21	185,153
3	Yada Yoshiki	131,167	150,172	31	281,371	14	Hamada Towa	136,405	46,296	7	182,709
4	Terui Kosuke	207,714	67,912	19	275,646	15	Ono Keito	126,472	45,080	11	171,563
5	Iizuka Ryoga	171,106	63,471	30,020	264,597	16	Aonuma Koshiro	71,328	91,572	17	162,917
6	Park Si-young	136,731	86,186	40,022	262,940	17	Okada Yuma	129,567	19,192	10,011	158,771
7	Chen Rickey	220,740	27,768	14	248,522	18	Kobayashi Chisato	35,536	120,540	5	156,082
8	Yanagiya Issa	191,035	38,565	7	229,608	19	Adam Nagai	108,155	45,142	4	153,301
9	Goto Yuki	181,124	46,549	10	227,684	20	Kurahashi Goten	134,151	17,409	15	151,576
10	Kato Daiki	157,868	67,410	11	225,289	21 (G)	Yoo Hyeon-seung	75,318	71,774	7	147,098
11	Kumabe Takuto	156,572	38,698	22	195,293	23 (G)	Koshimizu Ren	56,660	78,282	7	134,949

=== 4th Voting Period ===
The fourth and final voting period took place from June 28, 2026, immediately following the announcement of the third voting period results, until June 6 at 7:00 JST. Producers were allowed to vote for one contestant per day. Voting for the final broadcast took place on June 6 from 12:30 JST until the end of the last performance. Votes cast during the final broadcast were worth double points. The top 12 contestants who received the highest number of points will debut in KO1KEYZ.

An interim ranking was published on June 5, revealing the current ranking of three trainees, Abe Yura ranked 11th, Ono Keito ranked 12th and Iizuka Ryoga ranked 13th.

=== Result ===
#	Episode 11 (Total votes)			
#	Name	Votes	Prefecture	Audition Name
1	Kato Daiki	537,456	Aichi	RE:Shine
2	Yada Yoshiki	508,787	Nara	WEST KIDS
3	Park Si-young	498,627	Gyeonggi	Tanabota
4	Oh Shin-haeng	481,415	Mokpo	Tanabota
5	Goto Yuki	470,789	Kanagawa	Misters & Prince
6	Yanagiya Issa	417,479	Gunma	Full Swing
7	Ono Keito	408,598	Kochi	Raku
8	Abe Yura	407,595	Ibaraki	Pick-a-boo
9	Iizuka Ryoga	404,999	Gunma	FRESH-MEN
10	Sugiyama Ryuji	390,614	Saitama	Runway
11	Terui Kosuke	381,605	Chiba	FRESH-MEN
12	Hamada Towa	378,536	Hyogo	Hi teens!

== Episodes ==
No.	Title	Original release date
1	"Episode 1"	March 26, 2026
101 Japanese trainees are introduced in 27 groups and enter a room with a pyramid-shaped seating arrangement. They decide where to sit, with each row correspnding to a different level instead of each seat corresponding with a rank. After all the trainees have filled the pyramid, 22 global trainees, who are separated in 8 groups arrived and sit in the middle of the pyramid, which was previously blocked. It is also announced that the trainees must earn their spot in the 101 or else they will be eliminated. Not only that, the usual F class is replaced by the trainee candidate status and with that, the show starts and ends with most audition performances.
2	"Episode 2"	April 2, 2026
The rest of the audition teams perform and after all the trainees got ranked, the theme song "SHINSEKAI" got revealed and each class practices the choreography and lyrics, to which they will undergo another level reevaluation. Then, the trainees vote for their center pick for the theme song from the new set of A-class trainees, with Abe Yura chosen to be the center.
3	"Episode 3"	April 9, 2026
The first evaluation, the Group Battle, is announced, and they are organized into 16 teams. The options are "Loud" by INI, "Iris Out" by Kenshi Yonezu, "Bite Me" by Enhypen, "Show" by Ado, "Energetic" by Wanna One, "Love Seeker" by JO1, "The Peak" by Sekai No Owari and "Case 143" by Stray Kids. The teams practice and then perform the songs, with each individual being voted on separately by the studio audience. The first half of stages that performed are “Iris Out”, “Love Seeker”, “Show”, and “Bite Me”.
4	"Episode 4"	April 16, 2026
The first evaluation, the Group Battle continues. The second half of stages that performed are “Loud”, “Case 143”, “The Peak”, and “Energetic”. The episode ends with Dean Fujioka announcing the individual ranks with one for the individual votes and the FREE PART votes, and the other for the benefit totalled.
5	"Episode 5"	April 23, 2026
This is when the First Ranking Announcement occurs. Ranks 13-50 gets announced, along with the TOP 12 for this round’s voting.

== Post-Competition ==
- Ko1keyz released their debut single "Ko1keyz" on October 7, 2026.
Other contestants, other activities
- Some trainees formed/joined groups:
  - Yohan Emmanuel (54th) signed with Amartha Entertainment Production and was revealed as a member of XPK7RO in June 2026.
  - Horio Hijiri (55th) signed with Tsubasa Danshi Production was revealed as a member of YO GA YO NARA!!! in August 2026.
  - Nishida Soshi (67th) signed with Daredemo Dream and was revealed as a member of PARTYPARTY in August 2026.
