= Hula Fulla Dance =

2021 Japanese animated film by Seiji Mizushima

- Theatrical release poster

Japanese name
- Kanji: フラ・フラダンス
Transcriptions
- Revised Hepburn: Fura Fura Dansu
- Directed by: Seiji Mizushima (Note: Credited as Chief Director (総監督, Sō Kantoku).); Shinya Watada
- Screenplay by: Reiko Yoshida
- Edited by: Kumiko Sakamoto
- Music by: Michiru Ōshima
- Production company: Bandai Namco Pictures
- Distributed by: Aniplex
- Release date: December 3, 2021
- Running time: 109 minutes
- Country: Japan
- Language: Japanese

Hula Fulla Dance (Japanese: フラ・フラダンス, Hepburn: Fura Fura Dansu) is a 2021 Japanese animated film produced by Bandai Namco Pictures and directed by Seiji Mizushima and Shinya Watada. It premiered in Japanese theaters in December 2021.

== Cast ==
Character	Voiced by
Hiwa Natsunagi	Haruka Fukuhara
Ryōta Suzukake	Dean Fujioka
Kazuto Taira	Yuki Yamada
Kanna Kamakura	Karen Miyama
Ranko Takigawa	Miu Tomita
Ohana Ka'aihue	Kaori Maeda
Shion Shirasawa	Emiri Suyama
Mari	Saori Hayami

== Production and release ==
The film was first revealed in November 2020 as part of the "Zutto Ōen Project 2011 + 10...", commemorating the tenth anniversary of the 2011 Tōhoku earthquake and tsunami. It was produced by Bandai Namco Pictures, directed by Seiji Mizushima (chief director) and Shinya Watada, and written by Reiko Yoshida. Character designs are provided by Hiroko Yaguchi, while Michiru Ōshima is composing the film's music. The film was originally scheduled to premiere in Japan in early Q3 2021. However, the film's release was delayed to December 3, 2021. It was exhibited in the Japanese Animation section at the 34th Tokyo International Film Festival, which was held from October 30 to November 8, 2021, and was pre-screened on November 6.

Crunchyroll released the film outside of Japan on May 11, 2023.

=== Manga adaptation ===
A manga adaptation, written and illustrated by Mine Shito, was serialized in Media Factory's Monthly Comic Alive from January 27 to October 27, 2021. It was compiled in two tankōbon volumes, which were both released on November 22 of the same year.

== Reception ==
Richard Eisenbeis of Anime News Network described Hula Fulla Dance as a decent coming-of-age film with a solid message about problem-solving as a group instead of trying to bear them alone.
