= Yūki Mihara =

Japanese model and gravure idol (born 1990)

- 三原 勇希
- Born: April 4, 1990 (age 35); Higashiōsaka, Osaka Prefecture, Japan
- Occupations: Model; gravure idol
- Years active: 2004 -
- Spouse: Tomoya Inukai (m. 2023)
- Children: 1

Yūki Mihara (三原 勇希, Mihara Yūki; born April 4, 1990, in Higashiōsaka, Osaka Prefecture, Japan) is a Japanese model and gravure idol who is affiliated with Discovery Entertainment. She has a bachelor's degree in literature from Rikkyo University.

== Personal life ==
On April 1, 2023, she announced her marriage to a professional soccer player Tomoya Inukai. She gave birth to her first child, a baby boy on September 14.

== Filmography ==
=== TV series ===
Year	Title	Role	Network	Other notes
2008	Salaryman Kintaro	Yuki Ezawa	TV Asahi	
2009	Uketsuke Jo	Receptionist	NTV	
2010	Kōiki Keisatsu Futari no Deka	Yuka Mizushima	TV Asahi	
