= Dean Fujioka =

Japanese actor, musician, model, film director, voice actor, and producer (born 1980)

- ディーン・フジオカ
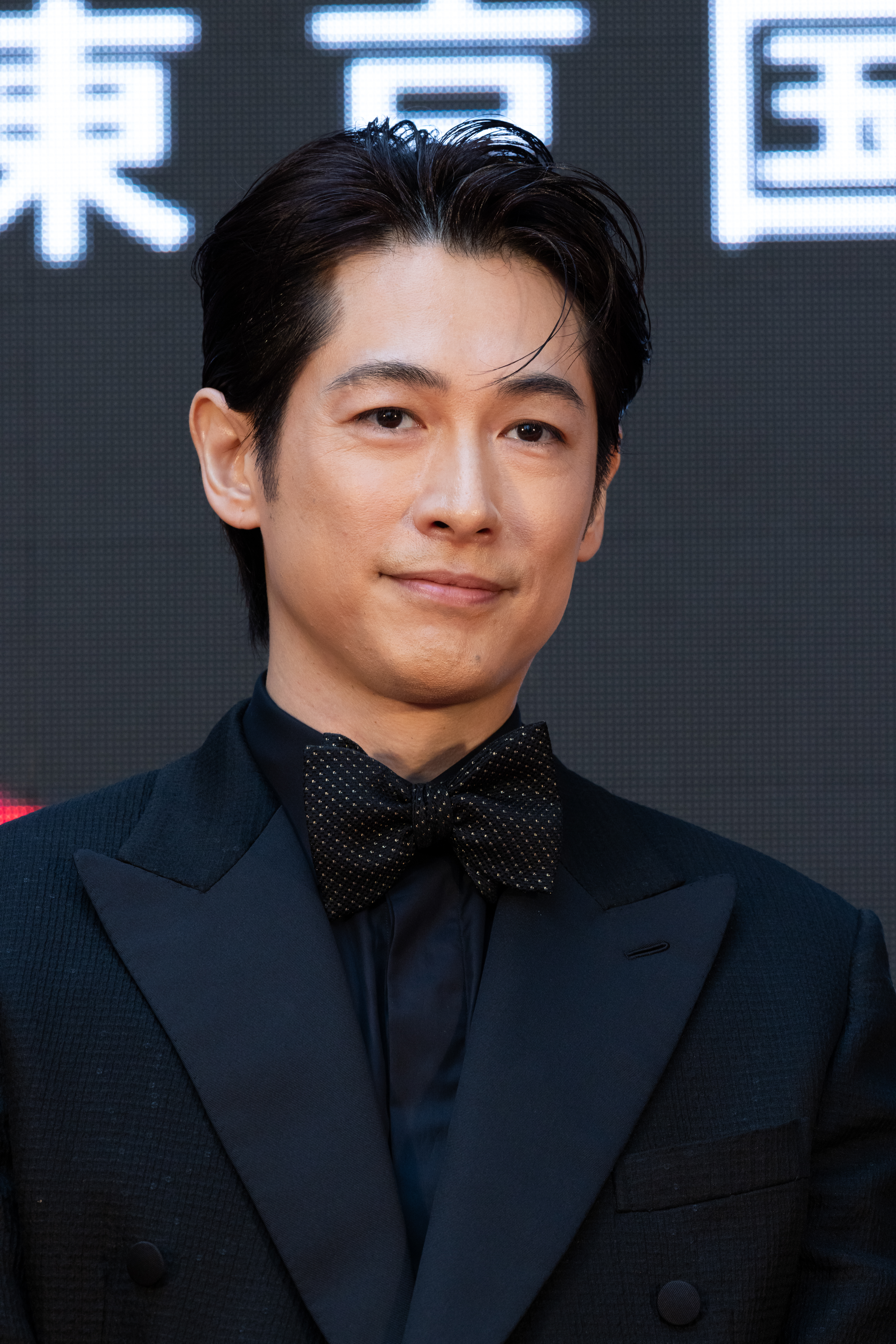
- Fujioka at the 37th Tokyo International Film Festival in 2024
- Born: Tatsuo Fujioka (藤岡 竜雄); August 19, 1980 (age 46); Sukagawa, Fukushima Prefecture, Japan
- Occupations: Actor; musician; model; film director; producer; voice actor
- Years active: 2004–present
- Agent: Amuse, Inc.
- Notable work: Asa ga Kita; Fullmetal Alchemist (film); Sherlock: Untold Stories
- Height: 180 cm (5 ft 11 in)
- Spouse: Vanina Amalia Hidayat (m. 2012; div. 2025)
- Children: 3
- Relatives: Mami Fujioka (sister)
- Musical career
- Genres: Pop; J-pop; wave; dubstep; drum and bass
- Instruments: Vocals; rapping; guitar; bass guitar; piano; synthesizer; drums; programming; beat boxing; trumpet
- Label: A-Sketch

Chinese name
- Traditional Chinese: 藤岡靛
- Simplified Chinese: 藤冈靛
Transcriptions
Standard Mandarin
- Hanyu Pinyin: Ténggāng Diàn
Yue: Cantonese
- Jyutping: Tang4gong1 Din6
- Website: www.deanfujioka.net

Tatsuo Fujioka (藤岡 竜雄, Fujioka Tatsuo; born August 19, 1980), better known as Dean Fujioka (ディーン・フジオカ, Dīn Fujioka; stylized as DEAN FUJIOKA) is a Japanese actor, voice actor, singer, songwriter, musician, model and film director/producer.

== Biography ==
Dean Fujioka was born in Sukagawa, Fukushima Prefecture, Japan. Moving with his family, he grew up in Kamagaya, Chiba Prefecture. Although Fujioka is multilingual (fluent in Japanese, English, Cantonese, Standard Mandarin, Indonesian) and made his debut in a Chinese fashion show, he has clarified in some interviews and variety shows that his parents and grandparents are all Japanese, who used to work or live in foreign countries. Raised in such a family, he grew determined to explore the world himself. After graduating from Chiba Prefectural Funabashi High School, Fujioka majored in IT at Seattle Central College in the city of Seattle, USA. After graduating from college, he traveled to different countries in Asia and came into contact with various ethnicities, cultures and languages.

Fujioka has a wide range of hobbies such as Chinese martial arts, kickboxing, chess, basketball, skiing and taking pictures, and also likes composition and lyrics. Although he is allergic to gluten, he enjoys eating and is particular about food.

Since his childhood, Fujioka had been influenced by musical theory and instruments. He produced music, first in Indonesia, but now mainly in Tokyo. Besides writing, composing, and producing, he also works as a rap singer. He can play a number of instruments, such as the guitar, the drums, and the piano. Fujioka also often shows off his beatboxing skills on TV shows. He likes music such as songs by Yutaka Ozaki and the song "Sweet Memories" by Seiko Matsuda. The song "Kessen wa Kinyōbi" of Japanese band Dreams Come True is the first single CD he bought by himself.

== Career ==
=== Active overseas ===
Dean Fujioka started his career as a model in Hong Kong's fashion scene in 2004 for both local and international designer brands. He continued to appear in Hong Kong's leading fashion and lifestyle magazines. Simultaneously with his career in fashion, he also embarked on various advertising campaigns, appearing in TV and print commercials for both local and multinational clients in the Asia pacific region.

In 2006, Fujioka started to pursue a career in acting. He moved his base from Hong Kong to Taipei and appeared in his first TV series Goku Dō High School with Bao Weimin, Bao Xiaobo, and Kingone Wang. His very first film August Story, starring Tian Yuan, Dean Fujioka, and Jan Cheung, caught public attention in the film festivals held in Hong Kong, Japan, and Taiwan.

In 2007, Fujioka appeared as a talented pianist in the TV series Corner with Love with Barbie Shu and Show Lo. He also appeared in Summer's Tail, his first film in Taiwan, with Bryant Chang, Enno Cheng, and Hannah Lin. A year later, Fujioka appeared in the TV series Miss No Good with Rainie Yang and Will Pan, produced by Angie Chai. Afterwards, he suspended his career in acting and went to Jakarta, where he met DJ Sumo (Sumantri) and collaborated on his songs.

In 2011, Fujioka appeared in the feature film Seediq Bale, about the history of Taiwan under Japanese rule, and in the film The Road Less Traveled with Vanness Wu, Jimmy Hung, Eric Tu, and Chris Lung. He also joined Amuse, Inc. in that year. In 2012, Fujioka appeared in the film Black & White Episode I: The Dawn of Assault, which was based on the popular Taiwanese TV series directed by Tsai Yueh-Hsun.

In 2013, Fujioka appeared in the TV series Just You in Taiwan. Furthermore, he starred in his first self-directed film I am Ichihashi: Journal of a Murderer in Japan. A year later, he appeared as a Chinese historical figure in his first Japanese TV movie Shooting Down – Three Pilots, the dramatization of the lives of three fighter pilots from Japan, China, and the U.S.A. He also appeared as a noble samurai-like Japanese in the TV series The Pinkertons in North America.

=== Getting his big break in Japan ===
In 2015, Fujioka starred as a private detective in his first Japanese TV series Detective versus Detectives. He also impressed with his appearance as a Japanese historical figure in the Japanese morning drama series Here Comes Asa!. In 2016, he not only appeared in the TV series Please Love the Useless Me and IQ246: The Cases of a Royal Genius but also starred in the web series Happy Marriage!? and the TV movie The Noisy Street, The Silent Sea, playing a variety of roles with distinctive personalities. Furthermore, Fujioka resumed his career in music and released his first album Cycle in March. He also started a regular segment in a radio program. In the same year, Fujioka released the download single History Maker which is used as the opening theme of the anime television series Yuri!!! on Ice. Along with global popularity of the anime, his name came to be known to people all over the world. According to the top trending Google Search queries by year in 2016, he was ranked 5th in the world in the category "Musicians".

In 2017, Fujioka started an irregular appearance as an influencer in a news program, Saturday Station. His song "Unchained Melody" is used as the ending of it and of Sunday Station. He starred as an unfaithful man in the film Marriage and released his first EP "Permanent Vacation" as its theme song. Fujioka also starred in the TV series May I blackmail you? with Emi Takei, and released his second EP "Let it snow!" as its theme song. He appeared in the TV series Moribito II: Guardian of the Spirit and Totto-chan!. Furthermore, he appeared in the live action adaptation of the anime and manga Fullmetal Alchemist. In this film, he played the colonel Roy Mustang, one of the most popular characters in the story.

In 2018, Fujioka held his first Japan tour entitled History In The Making 2018 and attracted 20,000 fans, including fans travelling to the concerts from overseas. He starred in the TV series The Count of Monte-Cristo: Great Revenge. His performance in this drama made Fujioka win the Best Leading Actor at the 12th Confidence Award Drama Prize. Furthermore, he released the single "Echo" as its theme song. The song is inspired by the "Wave" genre which attracted the attention in the worldwide club music scene. Its music video, in which he co-starred with Moga Mogami, received the Best Alternative Video at the MTV Video Music Awards Japan. Fujioka also appeared in the films Kids on the Slope and Recall and starred in the film The Man from the Sea, filmed in Jakarta.

In January 2019, Fujioka starred in the TV movie Les Misérables: Owarinaki Tabiji with Arata Iura. In the same month, he released his second album History In The Making. In February, he made his debut as a DJ at a club event presented by Taku Takahashi, among other stars such as starRo, TJO, and YUC'e. In March, he was nominated for the Best Supporting Actor of the 42nd Japan Academy Prize for his performance in the film Recall. From February to May, he held his first Asia tour, titled Born To Make History. The tour venues included Shanghai, Hong Kong, Taiwan and Indonesia. In September, he appeared as the Executive Secretary to the Prime Minister in the film Hit Me Anyone One More Time directed by Koki Mitani. Meanwhile, he took part in the festival 908 FESTIVAL 2019 presented by KREVA. From October onward, he starred in the Japanese TV series Sherlock: Untold Stories. He also sang its theme song "Shelly" and opening song "Searching For The Ghost". In November, in the omnibus film Angel Sign directed by manga artist Tsukasa Hojo, he co-starred with Nao Matsushita. He also sang its theme song. Meanwhile, by his remarks on a TV variety show, he collaborated with the sweets cafe "taiwan ten cafe" originated in Taiwan. He supervised drinks with tapioca named "Dean Tapioca" and put them on sale for a limited time. Around the same time, he presided over "Weibo Account Festival in Japan 2019" for the first time, and also received the Ambassador of Sino-Japanese Cultural Exchange. In December, he released his third EP "Shelly". This includes the song "Send It Away (feat. GONG)", which made him the first Japanese artist to be ranked in the charts 东方风云榜 (ERC Chinese Top Ten), also known as the Chinese version of Billboard. The song's highest ranking on the charts was No. 4.

=== 2020's ===
In February 2020, Fujioka assumed the post of an ambassador of "World Robot Summit 2020". Meanwhile, he planned to hold his live tour from October 2020 to January 2021, but cancelled it due to the spread of COVID-19. In August, he released the download single "Neo Dimension" on his birthday. There was a song "My Dimension" that he wrote in 2008 and first released in 2013 as his self-introduction and the statement of his intentions. He evolved it into a completely new form song after 12 years. In September, he released the download single "东京游 (Tokyo Trip)". On this song, he collaborated with 福克斯 (FOX) which is a rapper and co-starred with him in the variety show 潮流合伙人 (FOURTRY) within the China's video streaming service iQIYI last year. In October, he released the download single "Go The Distance". There are both Japanese and Chinese versions of the song, and the Chinese version became the campaign theme song for the mobile game Hidden World Records (Chinese: 隐世录; pinyin: Yǐn Shì Lù), created by China's largest game company NetEase. MVs of each version were made to commemorate this collaboration and he became an anime character in them. Meanwhile, he appeared in the TV series Dangerous Venus. In December, he held his first live stream concert entitled Plan B, which was distributed to the whole world. Prior to the concert, he released the download single "Follow Me".

Fujioka appeared in the TV series Reach Beyond the Blue Sky, which aired from February 2021, and it was his first appearance in the taiga drama. He played Godai Tomoatsu in the asadora Here Comes Asa!, which aired on the same TV station from 2015 to 2016, and he played the same role again. In March, he released his single "Take Over". In April, he published his picture book FamBam named after his fan club. Furthermore, he also launched the "DEAN FUJIOKA Picture Book Donation Journey #SavewithFamBam", a support project that began with his desire to "create a colorful future with children through picture books", and sought support for this project through crowdfunding until March 31, 2021. The money raised, together with a portion of the proceeds from the picture book, will be used to provide learning opportunities for children in Japan and Asia, in cooperation with the INGO Save the Children. In June, he published his first photo book Z-Ero. From July, he appeared in the TV series My Fair Prince. Meanwhile, he held his live tour entitled Musical Transmute, from September to December. In November, he became the first Japanese ambassador for the men's category of the fashion brand COACH. In December, the animated film Hula Fulla Dance, his first challenge to a voice actor, was released. In the same month, he released his third album Transmute.

In January 2022, Fujioka starred in the film Pure Japanese. He also created and produced it. In March, he appeared as Mori Arinori in the TV movie Tsuda Umeko: Osatsu ni Natta Ryūgakusei. From April, he starred in the TV series Pandora's Fruit Season 1 and Season 2. He also sang its theme song "Apple". Furthermore, in May and June, a two-part sequel to the 2017 live-action film Fullmetal Alchemist in which he appeared were released. In June, the film The Hound of the Baskervilles: Sherlock the Movie, a sequel to the TV series in which he starred in 2019, was also released. In July, he released his single "Apple". This includes the song "Be Alive", which was released for distribution in June and became the theme song for Identity V Japan League. From September, he starred in the TV series HOTEL -NEXT DOOR-. Meanwhile, he co-developed a yokan with the confectionery manufacturing and sales company Taneya, which he marketed under the name "Dean Fuji Yokan". The coffee sauce for the yokan is made from coffee from Gayo District, Aceh, Indonesia. A portion of the purchase price of the coffee will be used to support the activities of the Sumatran Orangutan Conservation Programme through The Orang Utan Regenwald GmbH. This project aims to protect the environment of the forests where endangered orangutans live and to enrich the lives of local producers. In November, he took part in the charity event Act Against Anything VOL.2 "THE VARIETY 28" by Goro Kishitani and Yasufumi Terawaki. In December, he appeared as a guest at the opening ceremony of the event Identity V Japan League Fall The Play Offs & X'mas Fan Meeting "Christmas Night ni Kane ga Naru".

From January 2023, Fujioka appeared in the TV series Hoshi Furu Yoru ni. In April, he appeared as Tengu / Sakamoto Ryōma in the Japanese morning drama series Ranman. In June, he appeared as a guest artist at Fantasy on Ice, a Japanese touring ice show, in Niigata and Kobe, performing with top figure skaters such as Yuzuru Hanyu, Johnny Weir and Stéphane Lambiel. In July, he released his first best-of album Stars of the Lid, and two weeks before this he released the download single "Teleportation" from the album. Meanwhile, he collaborated with the Taiwanese band Accusefive on the song "Hare no Hi / Qíng Tīan", which was released for distribution in July. He wrote new Japanese lyrics for "Finally (好不容易)", which was their smash hit as the ending song for the Netflix series Light the Night. The day after the release, he made a surprise appearance at their live tour AROUND THE NEW WORLD held at Kaohsiung Arena in Taiwan, to sing the song for the first time. In September, he held his first Nippon Budokan live entitled Stars of the Lid. Also, he appeared in the TV series Ya Boy Kongming! from September. He played the role of Liu Bei and narrated the story, all in Chinese.

In January 2024, Fujioka appeared in the TV movie Shōjiki Fudōsan Special and in the TV series Shōjiki Fudōsan 2 which aired from the following week. In February, "TOY BOY feat. DEAN FUJIOKA", a song by Japanese hip hop group HONEST BOYZ® led by EXILE NAOTO, was released for distribution (he participated as a guest). The song was also included in their first album HBZ released in March. In April, Thomas & Friends: The Mystery of Lookout Mountain, in which he participated as a guest voice actor for the dubbed in Japanese, was released. In June, he starred in Latest Chapter Special and Season 3, a sequel to the TV series Pandora's Fruit, in which he starred in 2022. In the same month, he appeared in the Taiwanese TV series on Netflix The Victims' Game Season 2. He played the role of a prosecutor, all in Chinese. In August, he held his first Billboard live tour. In the same month, he appeared in the film Last Mile. In September, he participated in his first outdoor music festival, Kaze to Rock Imonikai 2024 Imony Symphony "Furusato". In the same month, he became a goodwill ambassador for WWF Japan. In October, Orang Ikan, a film he produced and co-starred in, was selected for the "Gala Selection" section of the 37th Tokyo International Film Festival, and he appeared at the red carpet event. In November, he took part in a music festival SUPERPOP JAPAN 2024. In December, he released a limited Taiwanese edition of his best-of album Stars of the Lid, which was released in Japan the previous year. He also released the song "一起看黃昏 (Teleportation Chinese ver.)", a collaboration with Accusefive, which was included in this limited edition, for distribution on the same day.

In February 2025, Fujioka starred in Shōjiki Fudōsan Minerva Special, a spin-off of the TV series he appeared in the previous year. Meanwhile, he appeared at the event Ya Boy Kongming! The Movie kickoff Party and sang in the costume of Liu Bei, the character he played. In March, he became the first Japanese to serve as an AFA ambassador at the 18th Asian Film Awards. In April, he appeared in the TV series Taigan no Kaji~ Kore ga, Watashi no Ikiru Michi!~. In the same month, he appeared in the films Meet me at Angie's BAR and Oishikute Naku Toki. Furthermore, he played the role of Liu Bei and narrated the story in the film Ya Boy Kongming! The Movie, a sequel to the TV series in which he appeared in 2023. In May, he appeared in the film Our Eternal Song. In September, he held his live entitled RE: BIRTHDAY. In October, he took part in the festival 2025 SUPER SLIPPA 超犀利趴14 at Kaohsiung Arena in Taiwan. Meanwhile, he appeared in the TV series Just A Bit Espers. In December, he held his first orchestral concert entitled billboard classics DEAN FUJIOKA Premium Symphonic Concert -Tabibito-. Furthermore, he also participated in the event the 9th Momoiro Uta Gassen presented by Momoiro Clover Z on New Year's Eve.

From March 2026, Fujioka appeared on the Japanese reality competition show Produce 101 Japan Shinsekai as the National Producer Representative. From April, he starred in the TV series LOVED ONE. He also sang its theme song "Loved One", and released it for distribution in June. Furthermore, he took part in the outdoor music festival SAKYOU FES.2026 held in Tottori. In May, he appeared in the film Eiga Shōjiki Fudōsan, and his co-starring film Orang Ikan, which was screened at the 2024 Tokyo International Film Festival, was released in Japanese theaters. Meanwhile, he participated in the Crunchyroll Anime Awards 2026 as a performer. He sang "History Maker" during the opening of the awards ceremony. In November, he is scheduled to hold a solo concert entitled first kiss at Toyosu PIT.

== Personal life ==
Fujioka married Vanina Amalia Hidayat, who is Chinese Indonesian, in 2012. The couple had fraternal twins, a boy and a girl, born in 2014. In March 2017, Fujioka posted a picture of their third child, his second son on Instagram. On October 18, 2025, Fujioka announced through his agency that they have amicably divorced.

In a 2026 appearance on the TV show くりぃむの超体験グランプリ! Fujioka disclosed that he unknowingly ingested a spiked drink and later woke up on the street. He had missed the last train home and was invited by a male foreigner to stay at his house nearby. He was handed a drink while an adult video was playing on the TV, after which he lost consciousness. A newspaper deliveryman later woke him up by the sidewalk and escorted him to the station.

== Filmography ==
=== Film ===
- August Story (2006, Hong Kong, Japan and Taiwan) as Ping-on
- Breeze of July (2007, Hong Kong) as Michito
- Summer's Tail (2007, Taiwan) as Akira Fuwa
- Warriors of the Rainbow: Seediq Bale (2011, Taiwan) as Miyakawa, the signaller
- Road Less Traveled (2011, Taiwan) as Yi
- Black & White Episode I: The Dawn of Assault (2012, Taiwan) as Agent Lee (Agent Li)
- I am Ichihashi: Journal of a Murderer (2013, Japan) as Tatsuya Ichihashi
- Dance! Dance! Dance! (2014/2015, Belgium and Japan) as Furu
- Shanti Days: 365-nichi, Shiawase na Kokyū (2014, Japan) as Atsushi Narayama
- Ninja The Monster (2015, Japan) as Denzō
- Go! Crazy Gangster (2016, Taiwan) Tseng, Shuai-nan (Zēng Shuàinán)
- Kekkon (Marriage) (2017, Japan) as Kenji Urumi
- Hagane no Renkinjutsushi (Fullmetal Alchemist) (2017, Japan) as Colonel Roy Mustang, The Flame Alchemist
  - Hagane no Renkinjutsushi: Kanketsu-hen - Fukushūsha Scar (Fullmetal Alchemist The Revenge of Scar) (2022, Japan)
  - Hagane no Renkinjutsushi: Kanketsu-hen - Saigo no Rensei (Fullmetal Alchemist The Final Alchemy) (2022, Japan)
- Sakamichi no Apollon (Kids on the Slope) (2018, Japan) as Junichi Katsuragi
- Umi wo Kakeru (The Man from the Sea) (2018, Japan, France and Indonesia) as Laut
- Sora-tobu Taiya (Recall) (2018, Japan) as Yūta Sawada
- Kioku ni Gozaimasen (Hit Me Anyone One More Time) (2019, Japan) as Isaka, the Executive Secretary to the Prime Minister
- Angel Sign (2019, Japan) as Takaya
- Pure Japanese (2022, Japan) as Daisuke Tateishi (also creator and producer)
- The Hound of the Baskervilles: Sherlock the Movie (2022, Japan) as Shishio Homare
- Last Mile (2024, Japan) as Dōgen Igarashi
- Orang Ikan (2024, Singapore, Indonesia, Japan and United Kingdom) as Saitō
- Angie no BAR de Aimashō (Meet me at Angie's BAR) (2025, Japan) as a mysterious young man
- Oishikute Naku Toki (2025, Japan) as Shinya Kazama 30 years later
- Paripi Kōmei THE MOVIE (Ya Boy Kongming! The Movie) (2025, Japan) as Ryūbi (Liu Bei) / Narration
- Chichi to Boku no Owaranai Uta (Our Eternal Song) (2025, Japan) as Ryōichi
- Eiga Shōjiki Fudōsan (2026, Japan) as Ryōma Kamiki
- Ryuji (2026, Japan) as a building owner

=== Television ===
- Goku Dō High School (School Royale) (2006, Taiwan) – Dean Shindō
- Corner With Love (2007, Taiwan) – Kaede Andō
- Miss No Good (2008, Taiwan) – Chia, Sze-le (Jiǎ Sīlè)
- Just You (2013, Taiwan) – Dean Kamiya
- Gekitsui San-nin no Pilot (Shooting Down – Three Pilots) (2014, Japan) – Yue, Yi-chin (Yuè Yǐqín)
- The Pinkertons (2014–2015, Canada) – Kenji Harada
- Tantei no Tantei (Detective versus Detectives) (2015, Japan) – Sōta Kirishima
- Asa ga Kita (Here Comes Asa!) (2015–2016, Japan) – Godai Tomoatsu
- Dame na Watashi ni Koishite Kudasai (Please Love the Useless Me) (2016, Japan) – Ayumu Kurosawa
- Kensō no Machi, Shizuka na Umi (The Noisy Street, The Silent Sea) (2016, Japan) – Shin Minazuki
- IQ246: Kareinaru Jikenbo (IQ246: The Cases of a Royal Genius) (2016, Japan) – Kensei
- Moribito II: Guardian of the Spirit (2017, Japan) – Ehang
- Imakara Anata wo Kyōhaku Shimasu (May I blackmail you?) (2017, Japan) – Kanji Senkawa
- Totto-chan! ep. 38 (2017, Japan) – Hiroshi Kawake
- Monte-Cristo Haku: Kareinaru Fukushū (The Count of Monte-Cristo: Great Revenge) (2018, Japan) – Dan Saimon, Monte-Cristo Shinkai
- Les Misérables: Owarinaki Tabiji (2019, Japan) – Jun Baba
- Sherlock: Untold Stories (2019, Japan) – Shishio Homare
  - Sherlock: Special Edition (2019, Japan)
- Kiken na Venus (Dangerous Venus) (2020, Japan) – Yūma Yagami
- Seiten wo Tsuke (Reach Beyond the Blue Sky) (2021, Japan) – Godai Tomoatsu
- Oshi no Ōjisama (My Fair Prince) (2021, Japan) – Tomohisa Mitsui
- Tsuda Umeko: Osatsu ni Natta Ryūgakusei (2022, Japan) – Mori Arinori
- Pandora no Kajitsu: Kagaku Hanzai Sōsa File Season1 (Pandora's Fruit Season1) (2022, Japan) – Yūichi Kohiruimaki
  - Pandora no Kajitsu: Kagaku Hanzai Sōsa File Saishin-Shō SP (Pandora's Fruit The Latest Chapter Special) (2024, Japan)
- HOTEL -NEXT DOOR- (2022, Japan) – Katsuaki Saegusa
- Hoshi Furu Yoru ni (2023, Japan) – Shinya Sasaki
- Ranman (2023, Japan) – Tengu / Sakamoto Ryōma
- Paripi Kōmei (Ya Boy Kongming!) (2023, Japan) – Ryūbi (Liu Bei) / Narration
- Shōjiki Fudōsan Special (2024, Japan) – Ryōma Kamiki
  - Shōjiki Fudōsan 2 (2024, Japan)
  - Shōjiki Fudōsan Minerva Special (2025, Japan)
- Ossan's Love: Returns ep.4 (2024, Japan) – Shō Lagerfeld
- Ijin Andro Shi (Andro The Alien) (The SF Short Drama of Fujiko・F・Fujio Season3) (2025, Japan) – Andro
- Taigan no Kaji~ Kore ga, Watashi no Ikiru Michi!~ (2025, Japan) – Tatsuya Nakatani
- Chottodake Esper (Just A Bit Espers) (2025, Japan) – Ōsuke
- LOVED ONE (2026, Japan) – Masumi Mizusawa

==== Other than TV dramas ====
- We are Asia - Dean Fujioka & Friends
  - Digest version (2016, Nippon TV)
  - Original version (5 episodes) (2016, Nittele Plus)
- NHK Special: Kanzen Kaibō Tyrannosaurus〜Saikyō Kyōryū Shinka no Nazo〜 (2016, NHK) as a navigator
- Hirogare! Irotoridori: Reformer's no Tsue ep. 4 (2022, NHK Educational TV) as a guest
- Tiffany Blue ni Miserarete (2024, Nippon TV) as a narrator
- Telementary 2026: Sensō to Genbatsu〜 Shirarezaru Hikōjō no Kioku〜 (2026, TV Asahi) as a narrator
- Nemurenu Yoru wa AI-san to (2026, NHK Educational TV) as a guest

=== News program ===
- Saturday Station (TV Asahi), an irregular appearance as an influencer from 22 April 2017 to 26 September 2020

=== Web series ===
- Happy Marriage!? (2016, Japan) – Hokuto Mamiya
- Boku no Oshi wa Ōjisama (My best is Fair Prince) ep. 8 (2021, Japan) – Tomohisa Mitsui
- Pandora no Kajitsu: Kagaku Hanzai Sōsa File Season 2 (Pandora's Fruit Season 2) (2022, Japan) – Yūichi Kohiruimaki
  - Pandora no Kajitsu: Kagaku Hanzai Sōsa File Season 3 (Pandora's Fruit Season 3) (2024, Japan)
- Paripi Kanu & Chōhi! (Ya Boys Guan & Zhang!) (2023, Japan) – Narration
- The Victims' Game Season 2 (2024, Taiwan) – Zhang, Geng-hao (Zhāng Gěnghào)
- Talk survivor!DEAD or LAUGH (2026, Japan)

=== Anime film ===
- Hula Fulla Dance (2021, Japan) – Ryōta Suzukake
  - The short anime Kamiusagi Ropé on Mezamashi TV (ep. "Hula Dance") (2021, Japan) – Ryōta Suzukake

==== Dubbing ====
- Thomas & Friends: The Mystery of Lookout Mountain (2024) – Whiff

=== Other web shows ===
- Animated documentary
  - Mirai eno Tegami〜Kono Michi no Tochū kara〜 (2016, YouTube PrefFukushima) as a story teller
  - Mirai eno Tegami〜Kono Michi no Tochū kara〜, Jūittūme no Tegami: Kumo no Kanata (2017, YouTube PrefFukushima) as a story teller
- Nayameru Otona no Sōdan Live "Ichi-mon Ittō" (2025, ORIX group official Instagram "SMILE ON") as a special guest
- Produce 101 Japan Shinsekai (2026, Lemino, Mnet Plus and Nippon TV) as the National Producer Representative
- WHEN THE HOST NEEDS HOSTING (2026, IHG Hotels & Resorts special website)

==== Niconico Live ====
- DEAN FUJIOKA Niconama Hatsu Shutsuen! New Single "Take Over" Release Kinen Niconama 24 Jikan Tokuban (2021)
- DEAN FUJIOKA Nama Shutsuen! 3rd Album "Transmute" Release Kinen Tokuban (2021)
  - DEAN FUJIOKA 3rd Album "Transmute" Release Kinen Niconama Tokuban Furikaeri & Tokuban Making Jōeikai (2022)
- DEAN FUJIOKA Seitansai & Best Album "Stars of the Lid" Release Kinen Niconama Umaretekitekurete Arigatou! DEAN no Shukujitsu (2023)
  - DEAN FUJIOKA Seitansai & Best Album "Stars of the Lid" Release Kinen Niconama Tokuban Furikaeri & Tokuban Making Jōeikai (2023)

=== Short film ===
- 2 Cartons of Alphabet H (2006, Hong Kong), directed by Yan Yan Mak
- So Poetic (2007, Hong Kong), directed by Yan Yan Mak
- Sleeping Princess (2007, Hong Kong), starring with Denise Ho in Small Matters Music Video Story
- Sleeping Prince (2007, Hong Kong), starring with Denise Ho in Small Matters Music Video Story

=== Video games ===
- Stranger Than Heaven (2027) – Yū Shinjō

=== Music videos (sung by others) ===
For the music videos sung by DEAN FUJIOKA himself, see Music videos in the Discography.

- "Rolls Royce" by Denise Ho (2005, Hong Kong), directed by Yan Yan Mak
- "Echoes of Eternity" by Steven Lin (2007, Taiwan), directed by Jimmy Hung
- "Sleeping Prince" by Denise Ho (2007, Hong Kong), directed by Yan Yan Mak
- "This is Love" by Cyndi Wang (2007, Taiwan), directed by JP Huang
- "Ai Ya" by Vanness Wu (2011, Taiwan), directed by Chen Wei-ling
- "Falling Numb" by Rainie Yang (2025, Taiwan), directed by JP Huang

== Discography ==
=== Singles ===
1. "History Maker at InterCycle" (2016)
2. "Echo" (2018)
3. "Take Over" (2021)
4. "Apple" (2022)

=== Digital downloads ===
Songs not included on the CD and songs that were distributed before the CD was released are listed.

- "My Dimension" (2013), MV directed by DEAN FUJIOKA
- "Midnight Messenger mabanua Remix" (2016)
- "History Maker" (2016), the opening theme song of the anime Yuri!!! on Ice
- "History Maker TJO Remix" (2016)
- "Midnight Messenger Mandarin Ver." (2017)
- "Let it snow! YUC'e Remix" (2018)
- "Let it snow! Mandarin Ver." (2018)
- "Maybe Tomorrow" (2019)
- "Shelly" (2019)
- "Send It Away (feat. GONG)" (2019)
- "Searching For The Ghost" (2019)
- "Neo Dimension" (2020)
- "东京游 (Tokyo Trip)" (2020), sung by DEAN FUJIOKA & 福克斯
- "Go The Distance" (2020)
- "Follow Me" (2020)
- "Plan B" (2021)
- "Runaway" (2021)
- "Sukima" (2021)
- "Apple" (Pandora Ver.) (2022)
- "Be Alive" (2022)
- "Apple" (2022)
- "Teleportation" (2023)
- "In Truth" (2024)
- "Loved One" (2026)
- "君が好きだ" (2026)
- "抱きしめたい" (December, 2026)

=== EPs ===
1. Permanent Vacation / Unchained Melody (2017)
2. Let it snow! (2017)
3. Shelly (2019)

=== Studio albums ===
1. Cycle (2016)
2. History in the Making (2019)
3. Transmute (2021)
  The 12-track digital album Transmute (Trinity) was pre-released on October 29, 2021. The 22-track playlist album Musical Transmute was released digitally on December 27, 2021.

=== Compilation album ===
1. Stars of the Lid (2023)

=== Live albums ===
1. DEAN FUJIOKA Special Live "InterCycle 2016" at Osaka-Jo Hall (2017, Japan)
2. DEAN FUJIOKA LIVE&DOCUMENTARY SPECIAL Blu-ray BOX 2025 (2025, Japan)
3. DEAN FUJIOKA Live 2023 “Stars of the Lid” at Nippon Budōkan (2025, Japan)
4. The DEAN FUJIOKA Documentary "IDENTITY" (2025, Japan)

=== Music videos ===
Title	Year	Director	Note
"My Dimension"	2013	DEAN FUJIOKA	
"Priceless" (Lyric video)	2016	Unknown	
"Permanent Vacation"	2017	HIRO KIMURA	
"Unchained Melody"	2017	HIRO KIMURA	
"Let it snow!"	2017	Ken Ninomiya	
"DoReMi"	2017	Masatsugu Nagasoe	
"Echo"	2018	Ken Ninomiya	
"Let it snow! ～Mandarin Ver.～" (Official lyric video)	2018	BUDDHA.INC	
"History Maker ～HITM Ver.～"	2019	Ken Ninomiya	
"Maybe Tomorrow"	2019	Ken Ninomiya	
"History In The Making" (Official lyric video)	2019	Ikuo Yamamoto	
"Send It Away (feat. GONG)" (Official lyric video)	2019	；c (Semicolons_C)	
"Shelly"	2019	Atsunori Tōshi	
"Searching For The Ghost"	2019	Atsunori Tōshi	
"Neo Dimension" (Official lyric video)	2020	Yujiro Hashimoto	
"东京游 (Tokyo Trip)" (Official lyric video)	2020	Unknown	
"Go The Distance - CH Ver." (Official promotion video)	2020	Unknown	
"Go The Distance - JP Ver." (Official promotion video)	2020	Unknown	
"Plan B"	2021	Koh Yamada	
"Take Over" Live Music Video	2021	Spiky John	
"Runaway"	2021	Riku Ozawa	
"Fukushima" (Lyric Video)	2021	SUGiE (GOHOBI)	
"Sakura" (Lyric Video)	2021	Shinichiro Kobayashi	
"Hiragana (Visualizer)"	2021	MEI KONISHI	
"Spin The Planet (Visualizer)"	2021	MEI KONISHI	
"Sayonara (Visualizer)"	2021	MEI KONISHI	
"Missing Piece (Visualizer)"	2021	MEI KONISHI	
"Sukima (Visualizer)"	2021	MEI KONISHI	
"History Maker 2021 (Visualizer)"	2021	MEI KONISHI	
"Follow Me (Visualizer)"	2021	MEI KONISHI	
"Scenario (Visualizer)"	2021	MEI KONISHI	
"Take Over (Visualizer)"	2021	MEI KONISHI	
"Made In JPN (Visualizer)"	2021	MEI KONISHI	
"One Last Sweet Talk (Visualizer)"	2021	MEI KONISHI	
"Sekken (Visualizer)"	2021	MEI KONISHI	
"Apple" (Pandora Ver.) / Pandora's fruit Special Movie	2022	Unknown	
"Be Alive" (Promotion Video)	2022	KEISUKE NAKASHIMA	
"Apple"	2022	YUANN / kidzfrmnowhere.	
"Apple" (Performance Video)	2022	te2ta	
"Teleportation"	2023	Daiki Kamoshita	
"Stars of the Lid"	2023	Unknown	
"Loved One"	2026	Ryoma Kosasa	

=== Others ===
1. "Jídào Zhànyì (Gokudō Battle)" in the Goku Dō High School Original TV Soundtrack (2006). Singers: Kingone Wang, Li Wei Hao, Ma Ju Long, and DEAN FUJIOKA (beat box and rap).
2. "Hello Radio" (2016), the limited-time rental song for the spring campaign ACCESS! by Japan FM League and TSUTAYA. Musicians: The Poolside, including Shigeru Kishida, tofubeats, Takuya Ōhashi, Kaela Kimura, KREVA, DEAN FUJIOKA, Sakura Fujiwara, and YONCE.
3. "Hare no Hi / Qíng Tīan" (2023), the first Japanese-language single by Taiwanese band Accusefive (告五人). Fujioka wrote new Japanese lyrics for "Finally (好不容易)", which was their smash hit as the ending song for the Netflix series Light the Night (華燈初上). Singers: Accusefive and DEAN FUJIOKA.
4. "TOY BOY feat. DEAN FUJIOKA" (2024), the song from the first album HBZ, released for distribution in March 2024, by Japanese hip hop group HONEST BOYZ® led by EXILE NAOTO.

== Live performances ==
Date(s)	Title of performance	Venue(s)
May 8, 2016	FamBam	Festival Hall
August 19, 2016	FamBam Birthday Bash	Tokyo International Forum Hall A
December 22–30, 2016	DEAN FUJIOKA Special Live InterCycle 2016	Pacifico Yokohama National Convention Hall, Osaka Castle Hall
July 12–28, 2017	DEAN FUJIOKA Live 2017 "History In The Making"	Tokyo International Forum Hall A, Sukagawa City Culture Center Large Hall, Orix Theater
February 4–24, 2018	DEAN FUJIOKA 1st Japan Tour "History In The Making 2018"	Nagoya Congress Center Century Hall, TOHKnet Hall Sendai Large Hall, Pacifico Yokohama National Convention Hall, Hiroshima JMS Aster Plaza Large Hall, Fukuoka Civic Hall Large Hall, Festival Hall
February 16 - May 11, 2019	DEAN FUJIOKA 1st Asia Tour 2019 "Born To Make History"	Tokyo Electron Hall Miyagi Large Hall, Festival Hall, Fukuoka Civic Hall Large Hall, Hiroshima JMS Aster Plaza Large Hall, Shizuoka City Shimizu Cultural Hall Marinart Large Hall, Nagoya Congress Center Century Hall, Sapporo Education and Culture Hall Large Hall, NHK Hall, MODERN SKY LAB (Shanghai), Music Zone @ E-Max (Hong Kong), CLAPPER STUDIO (Taiwan), Motion Blue Jakarta (Indonesia)
~~October 3, 2020 - January 14, 2021~~ (The cancellation was announced on July 31, 2020, due to the spread of COVID-19)	DEAN FUJIOKA全国ツアー 2020-2021	Hondanomori Hall, Festival Hall, Sendai Sun Plaza Hall, Hiroshima Ueno Gakuen Hall, Okayama Civic Hall, Aichi Arts Center Large Hall, Sunport Hall Takamatsu Large Hall, Chiba Prefectural Cultural Hall Large Hall, Kenshin Cultural Center Large Hall, Ōmiya Sonic City Large Hall, Civic Auditorium Sears Home Yume Hall Large Hall, Fukuoka Civic Hall Large Hall, Kanagawa Kenmin Hall Large Hall, Shizuoka City Shimizu Cultural Hall Marinart Large Hall, Kuragi Cultural Hall, Kobe International House Kokusai Hall, Kanamoto Hall, Tokyo International Forum Hall A
December 26, 2020 (The archive was distributed until January 3, 2021)	DEAN FUJIOKA Live Streaming 2020 "Plan B"	Somewhere in Japan (online worldwide via LIVESHIP, Rōchike LIVE STREAMING, LIVEWIRE, 网易云音乐)
September 4 - December 26, 2021	DEAN FUJIOKA "Musical Transmute" Tour 2021	Kawaguchi Comprehensive Cultural Center Lilia Main Hall, Fukuoka Civic Hall Large Hall, Kurashiki City Auditorium, Tokyo Electron Hall Miyagi Large Hall, Nagaragawa Convention Center, Kobe International House Kokusai Hall, Minamisoma Civic Culture Hall Large Hall, Fuji City Cultural Hall Rose Theater, Aichi Arts Center Large Hall, Chiba Prefectural Cultural Hall Large Hall, Hiroshima Ueno Gakuen Hall, Civic Auditorium Sears Home Yume Hall Large Hall, Hondanomori Hall, Sunport Hall Takamatsu Large Hall, Sapporo Education and Culture Hall Large Hall, Kawasho Hall Hall 1, LINE CUBE SHIBUYA, Orix Theater
September 23, 2023	DEAN FUJIOKA Live 2023 "Stars of the Lid" at 日本武道館	Nippon Budokan
August 7–27, 2024	DEAN FUJIOKA Billboard Live Tour	Billboard Live Osaka, Billboard Live Tokyo, Billboard Live Yokohama
September 10, 2025	DEAN FUJIOKA LIVE 2025 "RE: BIRTHDAY"	NHK Hall
December 9–19, 2025	billboard classics DEAN FUJIOKA Premium Symphonic Concert -旅人-	Tokyo Metropolitan Theatre Concert Hall, Kyoto Concert Hall Large Hall
November 12 and 13, 2026	DEAN FUJIOKA LIVE 2026 "first kiss"	Toyosu PIT
February 7 - March 14, 2027 (Upcoming events)	DEAN FUJIOKA LIVE TOUR 2027「Breath 〜愛を知るために〜」	COMTEC PORTBASE, Zepp Fukuoka, SENDAI GIGS, Tokyo Tatemono Brillia HALL Minoh, LINE CUBE SHIBUYA

=== Festivals and events ===
- High Jinks by CHAPTER47 (2014)
- LIVE@Makitasports (2016)
- MTV VMAJ 2018 -THE LIVE- (2018)
- ☆Taku Takahashi presents Intergalactic -"History In The Making" Party- (2019) as a DJ
- 908 FESTIVAL 2019 (2019)
- Act Against Anything VOL.2 "THE VARIETY 28" (2022)
- Identity V Japan League Fall The Play Offs & X'mas Fan Meeting "Christmas Night ni Kane ga Naru" (2022)
- Fantasy on Ice 2023 in NIIGATA (2023)
- Fantasy on Ice 2023 in KOBE (2023)
- ACCUSEFIVE 1st Live Tour AROUND THE NEW WORLD (2023)
- Kaze to Rock Imonikai 2024 Imony Symphony "Furusato" (2024)
- SUPERPOP JAPAN 2024 (2024)
- Ya Boy Kongming! The Movie Kickoff Party (2025)
- 2025 SUPER SLIPPA 超犀利趴14 (2025)
- 9th Momoiro Uta Gassen (2025)
- SAKYOU FES.2026 (2026)
- Crunchroll Anime Awards 2026 (2026)

== Radio ==
- Asian! Plus α Dean Tatsunami RADIO (Nippon Cultural Broadcasting), a digital radio program from 9 February 2007 to 28 March 2008
- DEAN FUJIOKA's Ch-Ch-Ch-Check it Out!!! in SUNDAY MARK'E 765 (FM COCOLO), a regular segment from 3 April 2016 to 25 March 2018
- DEAN FUJIOKA･Produce･Super･Edition (JAPAN FM NETWORK COMPANY), a program for a limited time during January 2019 and December 2021
- ROPPONGI PASSION PIT (J-WAVE), a regular program from 4 April 2020 to 26 March 2022, with Yūki Mihara
  - From 4 April 2021 to 27 March 2022, its program was also aired on FM802.
- DEAN FUJIOKA New Calendar (TOKYO FM), a regular program from 5 April 2025 to 27 June 2026

== Books and serializations ==
- Tatsumaki Photoessay

=== Picture book ===
- FamBam, illustrated by Hikarin (April 9, 2021, published by Kraken Lab) ISBN 978-4910315041

==== translation ====
- Arisan Chef no Shōtaijō, written by Dario Pomodoro and illustrated by Lorenzo Sangiò (October 16, 2025, published by Kodansha) ISBN 978-4065410738

=== Photo book ===
- Z-Ero, photographed by RK (June 30, 2021, published by Gentosha) ISBN 978-4344038110
- First Kiss, photographed by Saki Omi (Scheduled for release on December 24, 2026, published by Kodansha) ISBN 978-4065462379

=== Serialization ===
- Have a nice Dean!! (December 2016 to October 2017 issues of UOMO, published by Shueisha)
- Shūkan Entame "STORY" (every Saturday in December 2021, morning edition of the Yomiuri Shimbun)

== Others ==
- Amuse Mobile art project "Shirotoiro"
  - 不変 (Fuhen) (2016), collaborated with Hina Sakurada
- The 150th Anniversary of Beatrix Potter's Birth: Peter Rabbit Exhibition (2016 - 2017, Tokyo, Fukuoka, Sendai, Osaka, Hiroshima and Nagoya) as an official supporter and an audio guide navigator
  - Dean Fujioka Hatsu no Igirisu Tabi: Utsukushiki Kosui Chihō, Peter Rabbit no Sekai wo Tazuneru (2016, BS Asahi)
- Jack-O-Land "Celebrity Parade" (2016, Yokohama Arena) as a special guest
- Bubble tea "Dean Tapioca" (2019, taiwan ten cafe) as the supervisor of the drink
- Weibo Account Festival in Japan 2019 (2019, Tokyo) as a master of ceremonies
- Charity goods project for medical support of COVID-19 "Amuse Heart Fes. in A!SMART" (2020), agreed with the purpose and participated
- World Robot Summit 2020
  - Opening Ceremony of WRS in Aichi (2021, Aichi Sky Expo) as an ambassador
  - Opening Ceremony of WRS in Fukushima (2021, Robot Test Field located in Fukushima Prefecture) as an ambassador
- Coach (2021 - 2023) as an ambassador for the men's category
- Epson "ORIENT STAR" (2021 -, China) as an ambassador
- Japan Exchange Group "Dainōkai" (The final session of the year) (2021, Osaka Exchange) as a guest
- "Snoopy Happiness Float 2022" Departure ceremony PR event (2022, in front of Tokyo Tower) as a special guest
- Ribbon-cutting ceremony at Lanvin Ginza Store (2022, Ginza) as a special guest
- FWD Life Insurance Company, Limited (2022 - 2024, Japan) as an ambassador
- "2024 TAIWAN EXCELLENCE in TOKYO ft. GOOD DESIGN AWARD" Opening ceremony and talk show (2024, KITTE Marunouchi) as an event ambassador
- WWF Japan (2024 - 2026) as a goodwill ambassador for WWF Japan
- 37th Tokyo International Film Festival
  - Red carpet event (2024, Tokyo Midtown Hibiya)
  - Q&A (2024, Marunouchi Toei)
- Yamagata International Movie Festival (2024, Movie On Yamagata), the stage greeting of the invited film Pure Japanese
- Emulation and Admiration: Two Stories of Collecting European Art - European Master Paintings from The San Diego Museum of Art and The National Museum of Western Art, Tokyo (2025, National Museum of Western Art and Kyoto City KYOCERA Museum of Art) as an audio guide navigator
- 18th Asian Film Awards (2025, Hong Kong) as an AFA ambassador
- Crunchyroll Anime Awards (2025, Grand Prince Hotel Shin Takanawa) as a presenter
- TECH WORLD e Yōkoso! Kokoro Hureau Special Guest Day (2025, TECH WORLD at the Osaka-Kansai Expo 2025) as a special guest
- The Quest of Wonders Parade (2025 - , Sanrio Puroland) as the voice of librarian Pirione

== Awards and nominations ==
Year	Award	Category	Work	Result	Ref.
2016	88th The Television Drama Academy Awards	The Television Prize	Asa ga Kita (Here Comes Asa!)	Won	
2016	9th Tokyo Drama Awards	Best Supporting Actor (Best Performance by an Actor in a Supporting Role)	Asa ga Kita (Here Comes Asa!)	Won	
2016	3rd Yahoo! Search Grand Prize	Person Category: Grand Prize, Actor Category Prize		Won	
2016	CONFiDENCE Award Drama Prize Annual Grand Prize	Newcomer of the Year		Won	
2016	39th Anime Grand Prix	Anime Song	History Maker	Won	
2017	IGN Best of 2016 Awards	Best Anime Opening	"History Maker"	Won	
2017	1st Crunchyroll Anime Awards	Best Opening	"History Maker"	Won	
2017	41st Elan d'or Awards	Newcomer of the Year		Won	
2017	24th AnimeLand Grand Prix	Best Theme Song	"History Maker"	Won	
2017	5th Japan Action Awards	Best Action Actor	IQ246: The Cases of a Royal Genius	Nominated	
2017	7th Newtype Anime Awards	Best Theme Song	"History Maker"	3rd place	
2018	12th CONFiDENCE Award Drama Prize	Best Leading Actor	The Count of Monte-Cristo: Great Revenge	Won	
2018	MTV Video Music Awards Japan	Best Alternative Video	"Echo"	Won	
2019	42nd Japan Academy Prize	Best Supporting Actor	Recall	Nominated	
2019	Heisei AniSong Grand Prix	2010-2019 Users Voting Award	"History Maker"	Won	
2019	Weibo Account Festival in Japan 2019	Ambassador of Sino-Japanese Cultural Exchange		Won	
2026	24th Best Formalist Award	Male Section		Won	
