= I Am Ichihashi: Journal of a Murderer =

I am Ichihashi: Journal of a Murderer
- Theatrical release poster
- Directed by: Dean Fujioka
- Written by: Hiroaki Yuasa
- Based on: Until I Was Arrested by Tatsuya Ichihashi
- Produced by: Toshiaki Nakazawa
- Starring: Dean Fujioka
- Music by: Tomohide Harada
- Distributed by: Sedic International Inc.
- Release date: 9 November 2013
- Running time: 83 minutes
- Country: Japan
- Language: Japanese

I Am Ichihashi: Journal of a Murderer (I am ICHIHASHI逮捕されるまで, I am Ichihashi Taiho Sareru made) is a 2013 Japanese film directed by and starring Dean Fujioka in the title role. The film was released in Japan on 9 November 2013. Based on the book Until I was Arrested by Tatsuya Ichihashi, the film portrays the two and a half years in which Ichihashi remained on the run following the murder of Lindsay Hawker in March 2007 until his arrest in November 2009.

== Cast ==
- Dean Fujioka as Tatsuya Ichihashi
- Takashi Nishina
- Shinichi Tsuha
- Cozy Sueyoshi

The theme song, "My Dimension", is also sung by Dean Fujioka.

== Production ==
The family of the deceased Lindsay Ann Hawker were not contacted by the producers during the filming of the movie, and Ichihashi refused to meet with Fujioka before filming started. The production company has no plans to donate profits from the film to the Hawker family, as they have already refused to accept royalties from Ichihashi's book.
