= Murder in Japanese law =

Aspect of Japanese criminal law

Murder (殺人, satsujin) in Japanese law is intentionally killing another person without justification.

The crime of murder is specified in Chapter XXVI of the Japanese criminal code. It is punishable by five years to life in prison, and with the death penalty if aggravating circumstances are proven. The only exception is for juvenile offenders since the minimum age for capital punishment in Japan is 18.

== Aggravated murder ==
The death penalty is permissible when aggravating circumstances are decided to be proven by a nine-person panel of six jurors and three professional judges. The list of death penalty-permissible aggravating circumstances are if the murder was committed:

- Along with one or more other murders
- With torture of the victim
- During the commission of a kidnapping
- During the commission of a robbery
- During the commission of a hostage-taking
- During an act of insurrection
- During an act of treason
- During an act of espionage
- During an act of arson
- During the commission of an intentional derailment of a train or sinking of a ship
- During the commission of intentional water poisoning
- During an act of rape
- During the commission of an aircraft hijacking
- During the commission of an intentionally caused aircraft crash

If not given the death penalty, aggravated murder is punished by life imprisonment.

== Insanity ==
Like most other developed countries, Japan has a process for insanity pleas in homicide cases. If a defendant is found not guilty of murder by reason of insanity, the defendant is committed to legally mandated hospitalization.

== Offenses and sentences ==
Japanese law specifies a variety of homicide offenses, for which the definitions, requisite articles of the Penal Code, and sentences are listed below.

Offense	Definition	Article	Sentence
Causing death through negligence	Negligently causing the death of another	Article 210	Fine up to ¥500,000 (Note: US$3,700)
Damage to buildings causing death	Damaging a building or vessel, causing a person's death	Article 260	3 to 5 years in prison
Causing death through negligence in the pursuit of social activities	Failing to exercise due care required in the pursuit of social activities and thereby causing the death of another person	Article 211(1)	Up to 5 years in prison; fine of up to ¥1,000,000 (Note: US$7,400)
Abortion with consent causing death	When a person, at the request of a woman or with her consent, causes the death of the woman during the commission of a non-professional abortion	Article 213	3 months to 5 years in prison
Abandonment causing death	When a person abandons another who, by reason of senility, immaturity, physical handicap, or disease, is in need of support, causing that person's death	Article 219	3 to 5 years in prison
Unlawful capture or confinement causing death	Unlawfully capturing or confining another person, causing that person's death	Article 221	3 to 7 years in prison
Abortion through professional conduct causing death	When a physician, midwife, pharmacist, or pharmaceuticals distributor, at the request of a woman or with her consent, causes the death of a woman during the commission of a professional abortion	Article 214	6 months to 7 years in prison
Inducing or aiding suicide; consensual homicide	Inducing or aiding another person's suicide or killing another at the other's request or with the other's consent	Article 202	6 months to 7 years in prison
Abuse of authority causing death	When a person performing or assisting in judicial, prosecutorial, or police duties abuses their authority and unlawfully captures or confines another, causing the person's death	Articles 194 and 196	6 months to 10 years in prison
Dangerous driving causing death	Driving a vehicle with four or more wheels under the influence of alcohol or drugs, which make it difficult for a person to drive safely, causing a person's death	Article 208-2(1) and (2).	1 to 15 years in prison
Injury causing death; manslaughter	Causing another person to suffer an injury resulting in death	Article 205	Maximum of life in prison or 30 years in prison (if life in prison is inappropriate) minimum of 5 years (Note: Manslaughter in Japan has a de facto maximum sentence of life in prison since no maximum is specified in the criminal code, though there are seldom cases of this occurring.)
Forcible indecency causing death	Through assault or intimidation, forcibly committing an indecent act upon a person causing their death	Article 181	Maximum of life in prison or 30 years in prison (if life in prison is inappropriate) minimum of 3 years
Murder	Intentionally killing another person without justification	Article 199	Maximum of life in prison or 30 years in prison (if life in prison is inappropriate) minimum of 5 years
Aggravated murder	Murder when an aggravating circumstance is proven	Article 199	Death penalty or life imprisonment

== See also ==
- List of murder laws by country
- Capital punishment in Japan
- Life imprisonment in Japan
