= Life imprisonment in Japan =

Life imprisonment (無期懲役, muki chōeki) is one of the most severe punishments available in Japan, second only to the death penalty. The punishment is of indefinite length and may last for the remainder of the person's life. The punishment may be imposed for murder, terrorism, robbery, treason, kidnapping and other serious violent offenses.

== Overview ==
Consisting of life sentence with the option of parole, a prisoner given a life sentence must spend at least 10 years in prison before they may have a chance at parole. But over the years the time spent in prison has become longer, and in 2010 and 2011 was about 35 years. According to the survey by Center for Prisoners' Rights in Japan, in 2012 there were 127 prisoners who had served over 30 years without parole. The rate of re-offending for most released prisoners is low, and the popularity of the death sentence is generally attributed to retribution. Those who are against the death penalty are calling for alternative longer sentences, with more than 10 years before being able to get parole, or jū mukikei (重無期刑), a life sentence without the possibility of parole.

== See also ==
- Whole life tariff, an equivalent determinate life sentence sometimes handed out for murder under England and Wales criminal law
