= Gems (TV series) =

- Genre: Soap opera
- Created by: Tessa Diamond
- Country of origin: United Kingdom
- Original language: English
- No. of seasons: 3
- No. of episodes: 121

Production
- Executive producer: Brian Walcroft (Series 3)
- Producers: Brenda Ennis (Series 1-2); Peter Tabern (Series 3)
- Running time: 30 minutes
- Production company: Thames Television

Original release
- Network: ITV
- Release: 2 January 1985 – 1 April 1988

Gems is a British television soap opera produced for the ITV by Thames Television. Three seasons of the programme were transmitted between 1985 and 1988.

Devised by Tessa Diamond, who had previously created ITV's first television soap, Emergency Ward 10, Gems was the name of a fictional fashion design company based in Covent Garden and managed by the Stone brothers, Alan and Stephen, whose differences in outlook and temperament meant that the business was often in choppy waters. The professional problems and personal lives of the employees of the company were the focus of the soap's storylines.

Gems was one of a series of ITV soap operas transmitted in afternoon slots during the 1980s produced by various ITV regional companies. The other British ITV "daytime" soaps included: Together (Southern), For Maddie with Love (ATV), Taff Acre (HTV), Miracles Take Longer (Thames) and Take the High Road (Scottish).

Gems was screened thrice weekly during its initial run in 1985, followed by a twice-weekly season in 1986 and returned to a thrice-weekly slot for its third and final run in 1988.

The series directors included: Mervyn Cumming (Series 1–2), Christopher Baker (Series 1–2), Stuart Orme (Series 1), Keith Washington (Series 1), Brian Lighthill (Series 3) and Jane Howell (Series 3).

Scriptwriters included: Guy Meredith, Christopher Russell, Martin Worth (Series 1), Barbara Clegg (Series 1–2), Ben Steed (Series 1), Bill Lyons (Series 1), Valerie Georgeson (Series 1), Jenny McDade (Series 1), Liane Aukin (Series 2), Ted Rhodes (Series 2) and Tony Slattery (Series 3).

== Series overview ==
Series	Episodes	Originally aired	
Series	Episodes	First aired	Last aired
Series 1	56	2 January 1985	10 May 1985
Series 2	26	8 January 1986	3 April 1986
Series 3	39	6 January 1988	1 April 1988

== Cast ==
- Alan Stone - Cornelius Garrett
- Stephen Stone - Steven Mann (Series 1–2), Julian Fox (Series 3)
- Christina Scott - Anjela Belli
- George Rudd - Jonty Miller
- Shirley Campbell - Margo Cunningham
- Cally Johnson - Cindy O'Callaghan (Series 1–2), Sharon Maiden (Series 3)
- Bob Smith - David Cheesman
- Paul Currie - William Armstrong (Series 1), David Kitchen (Series 2–3)
- Charles Banks - Frederick Bartman (Series 1–2), David Savile (Series 3)
- Jean Briggs - Shelley Borkum (Series 1–2)
- Nicholas Howard - Keith Varnier (Series 1–2)
- Holly Parks - Victoria Burton (Series 1), Lizzy McInnerny (Series 2)
- Ben Colman - Mark Tandy (Series 1)
- Maggie Stone - Wendy Murray (Series 1–2)
- Anne-Marie Colman - Caroline Goodall (Series 1)
- Joy Devar - Sally Sagoe (Series 1)
- Matthew Roberts - Stevan Rimkus (Series 1)
- David Kark - Richard Klee (Series 1)
- Catherine Gardiner - Mona Bruce (Series 1–2)
- Tricia Pope - Madeleine Howard (Series 1)
- John Campbell - Wayne Norman (Series 1)
- Oliver Lloyd - Andrew Francis (Series 1)
- Gilly Hall - Dominique Barnes (Series 1)
- Sarla - Charu Bala Chokshi (Series 1)
- Lin Tai - Susan Leong (Series 1)
- Rachel - Carole Ashby (Series 1)
- Chrissy Thornton - Celia Imrie (Series 1)
- Bill Webb - Bryan Burdon (Series 1–2)
- Bobby Redmond - Ian Price (Series 2–3)
- Pru Murphy - Michelle Collins (Series 2)
- Andy Leggett - Sean Chapman (Series 2)
- Stephanie Wilde - Janet McTeer (Series 2)
- David Carney - Peter Hutchinson (Series 2)
- Lady Veronica West - Joanna Hole (Series 2)
- Ruth Brezinska - Sharon Cheyne (Series 3)
- Joe Bastiano - Mark Jefferis (Series 3)
- Harry Scott - Godfrey James (Series 3)
- Lynne - Georgina Hale (Series 3)
- Chandra - Janet Steel (Series 3)
- Malcolm - Andrew Powell (Series 3)
- Jessica - Tracey Childs (Series 3)
- Tom - James Garbutt (Series 3)
- Theo - Hugh Walters (Series 3)
- Penny - Elizabeth Hurley (Series 3)
- Glen - Tony Slattery (Series 3)
- Luke France - Gerry Sundquist (Series 3)
- Elinor Whiteside - Victoria Wicks (Series 3)

== Home media ==
The first episode of Gems is available as part of the Soap Box collection DVD set released by Network. The release includes selected episodes from several British soap operas.
