= Judy Wilson (actress) =

English actress (1938–2006)

- Born: 1938; Yorkshire, England
- Died: 1 April 2006 (aged 67–68)
- Occupation: actress
- Years active: 1970–2006
- Children: 1

Judy Wilson (1938 – 1 April 2006) was an English actress. Her most notable role was that of Mrs. Greenlaw, the housekeeper, in All Creatures Great and Small.

Her first known appearance was as a maid in Laurence Olivier's 1970 drama Three Sisters.

In 1979 she appeared in Murder by Decree.

Wilson made her debut in All Creatures in its 1985 Christmas Special. She was the third housekeeper of Skeldale House – after the original, Mrs. Hall (Mary Hignett), and Mrs. Hubbard (Marjorie Suddell) in the 1983 Christmas Special. She made five appearances in total, the others being the first four episodes of series 4: "One of Nature's Little Miracles", "Barks And Bites", "The Bull With the Bowler Hat" and "The Pig Man Cometh".

Her final role, before her death the same year, was in 2006's Dark Corners.

== Personal life ==
Wilson had one son, Simon Bell.

== Partial filmography ==
- Three Sisters (1970) – Serving maid
- Murder by Decree (1979) – Emily
- The Pilot (1980) – Mary
- Lady Killers (1981) – Emily Steel
- Dark Corners (2006) – Old Lady Patient (final film role)
