= Blink of an Eye (Star Trek: Voyager) =

- Star Trek: Voyager episode
- Episode no.: Season 6 Episode 12
- Directed by: Gabrielle Beaumont
- Story by: Michael Taylor
- Teleplay by: Scott Miller; Joe Menosky
- Production code: 233
- Original air date: January 19, 2000

Guest appearances
- Melik Malkasian - Shaman; Walter H. McCready - Tribal Alien; Obi Ndefo - Kelemane; Olaf Pooley - Cleric; Daniel Zacapa - Astronomer; Jon Cellini - Technician; Daniel Dae Kim - Gotana-Retz; Kat Sawyer-Young - Tureena; Scarlett Pomers - Naomi Wildman

Episode chronology
← Previous "Fair Haven"	Next → "Virtuoso"
- Star Trek: Voyager season 6

"Blink of an Eye" is the twelfth episode from the sixth season of the science fiction television series Star Trek: Voyager, 132nd episode overall. The show is set in the 24th century of the Star Trek universe, aboard the USS Voyager spaceship on a decades long journey back to Earth.

The episode follows the crew's interaction with a world where time passes rapidly, allowing them to witness most of its inhabitants' history. For the inhabitants, Voyager is fixed in the night sky, inspiring them as the eons pass. The science-driven aspect of this concept is time dilation, which is a real-world physical effect that must even be accounted for regarding the time of communications signals from satellites in Earth orbit.

This television episode debuted on United Paramount Network (UPN) on January 19, 2000.

== Plot ==
The starship Voyager approaches an alien world which is enveloped in a tachyon field, giving it an odd temporal nature. To learn more about the planet, Captain Kathryn Janeway orders the ship to move closer, but Voyager becomes trapped in orbit by the planet's magnetic field. While the crew concocts an escape plan, Seven of Nine surveys the planet and discovers that Voyager's presence is causing occasional quakes. Further scans reveal that time passes at a much more rapid rate on the planet and it is inhabited by primitive humanoids.

The crew determines the planet experiences 58 sunrises per minute of shipboard time. As hours on Voyager pass, centuries pass on the planet and its humanoid inhabitants reach a level of technology similar to 20th-century Earth. As the crew discusses the unusually rapid technological progress of the species, a radio message is broadcast at Voyager. Tom Paris wants to reply but Tuvok points out that the species has not developed warp technology; a reply would be a violation of the Prime Directive. Janeway suggests a covert one-person mission to the planet. As he would not be affected by the change in the passage of time because he is a hologram, the Doctor volunteers for the mission, which, due to the time differential, lasts three years from the Doctor's perspective, even though he is only gone from the ship for minutes. Upon returning, he reports that Voyager, simply by its presence, has encouraged the society to advance as the humanoids attempt to contact the "sky-ship". While some strive to establish peaceful contact, others are developing increasingly powerful weaponry to shoot down Voyager and stop the earthquakes.

The humanoids develop technology sophisticated enough to send astronauts on a crewed mission to make contact with the sky-ship. A capsule is launched and succeeds in docking with Voyager. Its two astronauts, a male and female, begin to explore the ship, which appears frozen in time, but fall unconscious from the stress of adjusting to the different space-time. The bodies are found on the bridge and are taken to sickbay. The female dies from the shock of adjustment but the male, Gotana-Retz, is successfully treated whilst Voyager is hit by a bombardment of antimatter artillery.

Janeway urges Gotana-Retz to return to the planet and convince them to cease the attack. Gotana-Retz does so just after Voyager's shields collapse. Suddenly, two spaceships appear alongside Voyager and use tractor beams to tow the vessel out of the planet's field. A visibly older Gotana-Retz briefly transports to Voyager to explain what has happened and Janeway thanks him and his people. On the surface, an elderly Gotana-Retz, long returned from his experience in space, gazes wistfully into the sky as his people's sky-ship vanishes from the heavens.

== Production ==
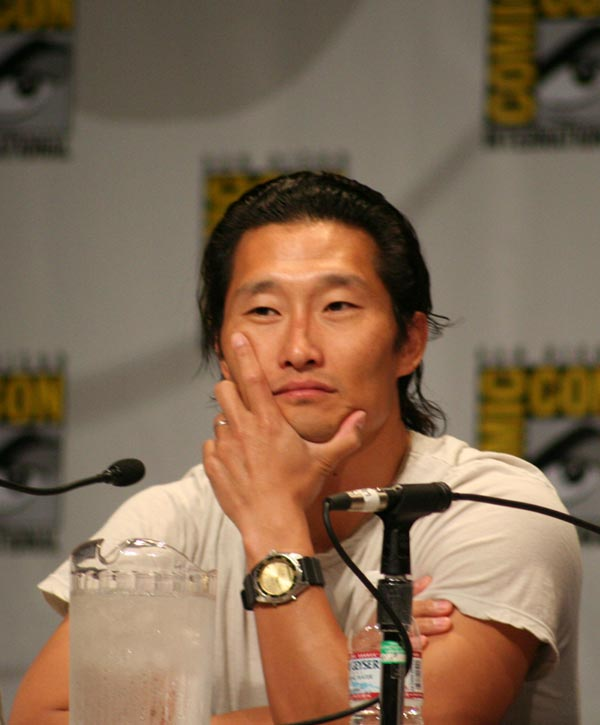
Daniel Dae Kim guest starred as an alien astronaut.

Producer Brannon Braga said it was a challenging episode to put together: "It was a very ambitious episode. We did our best to depict the evolution of a civilization over the course of thousands of years. I thought it was fun to go from seeing primitive people to seeing space travel. It had a very large cast and lots of sets, special effects, a very high-concept show."

Gabrielle Beaumont was the first female director on Star Trek (for the Star Trek: The Next Generation episode "Face of the Enemy"), and this was the last episode of Star Trek she directed.

This episode is noted for the performance of Daniel Dae Kim as Gotana-Retz, who was already known to sci-fi fans for Crusade. He would later appear in Star Trek: Enterprise and became widely known for his role in the hit 2000s TV show Lost and a starring role on the re-imagined Hawaii Five-0.

Olaf Pooley, who played the Cleric, was married to director Gabrielle Beaumont.

The title echoes the title of the Star Trek: The Original Series episode "Wink of an Eye" where Enterprise crew members were also experiencing time displacement.

This episode is believed to have been inspired by the 1980 novel Dragon's Egg by Robert L. Forward.

== Reception ==
The Guardian recommended this episode as one of "six to watch" Star Trek episodes, out of all episodes of the franchise up to that time. Gizmodo ranked "Blink of an Eye" as the 46th out of 100 of the best of all Star Trek television episodes to-date. Vox rated this one of the top 25 essential episodes of all Star Trek. Den of Geek ranked "Blink of an Eye" among the top 50 Star Trek episodes.

ScreenRant said this was the number one best episode of Star Trek: Voyager, based on an IMDB rating of 9.1 out of 10. SyFy ranked "Blink of an Eye" among the top ten Star Trek: Voyager episodes. The Hollywood Reporter ranked "Blink of an Eye" 5th out of 15 of the top episodes of Voyager. ThoughtCo ranked the episode as one of the top 10 episodes of Star Trek: Voyager. The Digital Fix said this was by far the best episode in season 6, with innovative story telling of bold science fiction concept, and concluded it was one of the greatest episodes in the whole series. SyFy Wire ranked this episode the 10th best episode of Star Trek: Voyager, a ranking it shared with the episode "Relativity" in their review. They praise "Blink of an Eye" for being a "surprisingly poignant episode" with an emotional and nuanced story. Tor.com included this as one of six episodes of Star Trek: Voyager that are worth re-watching.

ScreenRant said that "Blink of an Eye" was the third best time travel story of the entire Star Trek television franchise. CBR ranked this one of the top-twenty time travel themed episodes of all Star Trek series. Den of Geek also suggested it for their binge-watching guide focused on Voyager episodes featuring time travel.

It was highlighted by Bustle.com for being a Star Trek episode that did not have a villain in the traditional sense; rather, it explored the impact of technological influence between two cultures.

As of 2025, "Blink of an Eye" ranks first place as the most popular user-rated Voyager episode on IMDB with a weighted score of 9.0 out of 10.

== Expanded universe ==
The 2005 Star Trek novel Star Trek: Voyager: Distant Shores Anthology includes a short story 'Eighteen Minutes' that is set during Blink of an Eye. Star Trek novels are based on Star Trek universe canon but are themselves not considered a part of canon.

== Releases ==
This episode was released as part of a season 6 DVD boxset on December 7, 2004.
