= June Bland =

English actress (born 1931)

- Born: June Winifred Bland; 2 June 1931 (age 95); Kettering, Northamptonshire, England
- Occupation: Actress
- Years active: 1938–1989 • 2015
- Spouse(s): Bill Sellars (m. 1950; div. 1974) Bill Sellars (m. 2012; died 2018)
- Children: 3

June Bland (born 2 June 1931) is an English actress best known for her role as Vera Harker in BBC soap opera The Newcomers.

== Early life ==
Bland made her name in the world of entertainment at the age of 7 when she won the junior section of a "New Discoveries" contest in Irthlington, beating 20 other youngsters. Known as "The Kettering Shirley Temple", Little June Bland and England's youngest comedienne, her routine consisted of telling jokes, singing and dancing. During the Second World War, the girl entertained soldiers throughout the country with her talents.

Becoming a member of the Cytringans Dramatic Society and performing with the Northampton Repertory Company, it was here in 1948 that Bland first met fellow actor Bill Sellars. Two years later, they became engaged, at which point she decided to head to Indiana to see friends and with hopes of starting a stage career in the States. However, less than five months later, the outbreak of the Korean War forced her to return home, thus abandoning plans to move to California where more work would be available. On 23 September 1950, Bland and Sellars were married.

A week after their wedding, the couple joined Derby Little Theatre, appearing in productions at Derby Playhouse for the next four years. They moved to a caravan at Ockbrook in which they returned to Northampton in 1954. While Sellars became stage director and assistant producer before joining the BBC in 1958, firstly as a programme assistant followed by director and producer, Bland retired from acting to bring up their three children.

== Career ==
At a point when the children were old enough and attending school, Bland decided to return to acting, making appearances on television. These included Scotland Yard (credited as June Sellars), Lord Raingo, Bat Out of Hell (5 episodes, as Mrs. Houston), The Doctors (26 episodes, as Mrs. Lipska), Angels (4 episodes, as Mrs. Holder) and two Doctor Who serials - Earthshock and Battlefield.

Back on stage, she appeared in productions alongside the likes of Ingrid Bergman (Waters of the Moon at the Haymarket Theatre), Sir John Mills (Goodbye, Mr. Chips at Chichester Festival Theatre) and Elaine Paige (Anything Goes at the Prince Edward Theatre), as well as playing Miss Hannigan in Annie at the Queen's Theatre, Hornchurch and Lady Brighton in a long run of Me and My Girl at the Adelphi Theatre.

== Later life ==
In 1988, Bland helped to establish Stagecoach, a body of training centres designed to teach acting, dancing and singing to youngsters. Starting out in Surrey, further branches opened throughout the country including Norfolk (1991), Northampton (1992), Wilmslow (1993) and Basingstoke (1995). After 27 schools opened, the company branched out as a franchise in 1994. Bland, who acted as principal of the Peterborough branch, sold the business on in 2005.

Following this, she became artistic director of the Barn Theatre in Molesey, running the box office and directing pantomimes, as well as coordinating Show for Millie in 2003, a collection of music and dance featuring David Soul and Jan Graveson with proceeds going to charity Milly's Fund.

== Personal life ==
Moving to Molesey, Surrey in the mid-to-late 1950s, Bland and Sellars became involved with the Ember Players of Esher and from 1971, the Barn Theatre Club. They divorced in 1974, after which Sellars entered a civil partnership with Georgian Theatre manager Alan Sandilands, moving to Spain. After Sandilands died in 2012, Sellars returned to the UK and remarried Bland the following year, who cared for him in his final five years.
