= Crucible of Horror =

1971 film by Viktors Ritelis

- Promotional artwork bearing the Crucible of Horror title
- Directed by: Viktors Ritelis
- Screenplay by: Olaf Pooley
- Produced by: Gabrielle Beaumont; Christopher C. Dewey; Dennis Friedland
- Starring: Michael Gough; Yvonne Mitchell; Sharon Gurney
- Cinematography: John Mackey
- Edited by: Nicholas Pollock
- Music by: John Hotchkis
- Production companies: Abacus Productions; London-Cannon Films
- Distributed by: The Cannon Group (U.S.); Grand National Films (UK)
- Release dates: 19 July 1971 (San Antonio, Texas); 11 November 1971 (New York City)
- Running time: 91 minutes
- Countries: United Kingdom; United States
- Language: English
- Budget: £55,000

Crucible of Horror (Note: The film was originally titled The Velvet House during its production, and some promotional materials were created by its American distributor, Cannon Films, using this title. However, the film was first officially released as Crucible of Horror in July 1971 in the United States. In the United Kingdom, where the film received distribution through Grand National Films, it was released under the title The Corpse.) is a 1971 horror film directed by Viktors Ritelis, produced by Gabrielle Beaumont, and starring Michael Gough, Yvonne Mitchell, and Sharon Gurney. Its plot follows a mother who, along with her daughter, plots to murder her abusive husband at his hunting cottage.

A co-production between the British Abacus Productions and the American-based Cannon Group, the film was shot in England in 1969 under the title The Velvet House. It was first released theatrically in the United States as Crucible of Horror, opening in New York City on 11 November 1971, and was released the United Kingdom the following year, under the title The Corpse.

== Plot ==
Walter Eastwood is a wealthy and controlling patriarch who demeans and abuses his diminutive artist wife, Edith, and their teenage daughter, Jane. Walter's misogyny is shared by his son Rupert, who repeatedly refuses his mother's request that he pick up art supplies for her and mocks the idea of his younger sister getting a job since her father refuses to give her an allowance. During dinner at the family's large estate one night, Walter's friend, Gregson, arrives, and is greeted by Jane at the door. Jane tells her father that Gregson tried to kiss her. After dinner, Walter discovers Jane has stolen money, and brutally beats her with a cane. The following day, Edith proposes to Jane that they murder Walter.

When Walter plans a hunting trip to his remote cottage, Edith and Jane opt to remain home, while Rupert is unable to accompany him owing to a prior obligation. Edith and Jane arm themselves with a shotgun and trail Walter to the cottage, but their plans to kill him are thwarted when he hears them enter the house. The women pretend to have changed their minds, wanting to spend the weekend with him. Edith soon draws her shotgun, forcing Walter to sit and listen to her plight as she pours him a drink spiked with a sedative. The women liken Walter to the Marquis de Sade, whose writings they have recently read, and Walter responds with disgust that they would read such material. During the confrontation, Walter collapses unconscious.

Using a funnel, Edith forces more liquor down Walter's throat as he lies incapacitated, before she and Jane drag his body upstairs and place it in his bed, in an attempt to make his death appear as an alcohol-narcotic overdose. The women then return home in the middle of the night, and the following day, nervously await for Walter's body to be discovered. At night, Edith has a nightmare in which she sees a ghostly version of herself levitating outside, before descending into a nearby pond. The following morning, Edith phones the cottage and speaks with the family's maid, Mrs. Roberts, who is maintaining her cleaning duties there, and asks to speak to Walter. Mrs. Roberts tells Edith that it does not appear Walter is there. Later, Rupert phones the house, concerned as he has been unable to reach Walter, and demands they go to check on the cottage.

Edith and Jane return to the cottage, and are shocked to find Walter's bed empty. Outside, they discover a wooden crate, which inexplicably contains Walter's dead body. Moments later, they are approached by Reid, an architect friend of Walter. Reid tells them Walter failed to meet him for their planned hunting the day before. While Edith prepares tea, a suspicious Reid investigates the home, finding the bottle of sleeping pills in Walter's room. After Reid departs, the women drive the box containing Walter's corpse to a remote abandoned factory and push it over an embankment into a pond.

The women return home, where they are plagued by nightmares and frightening incidents, including the parlour window being smashed in. When Edith enters her art studio, she is startled by Walter's body, which she sees dangling upside down from a rafter. Edith frantically runs downstairs, where she finds an equally terrified Jane. When Walter approaches her, Edith collapses. The next morning, Walter enters the kitchen as usual for his morning breakfast, and is met by Jane, Edith, and Rupert—everything appears to be as it was before he was killed. At the table, Walter humiliates Jane by reading a letter she has received from Benjy Smith, a local boy who is infatuated with her. He then tauntingly asks Edith what she has planned for the day. She stares blankly, a tear dripping down her face.

== Cast ==
- Michael Gough as Walter Eastwood
- Yvonne Mitchell as Edith Eastwood
- Sharon Gurney as Jane Eastwood
- Simon Gough as Rupert Eastwood
- David Butler as Gregson
- Olaf Pooley as Reid
- Nicholas Jones as Benjy Smith
- Mary Hignett as Mrs. Roberts
- Howard Goorney as petrol pump attendant
- Sam as Sam the dog

== Themes ==
Film scholar Bryan Senn notes a subtext of incest in Crucible of Horror, writing that: "Even more disturbing is the notion that beneath the obvious dysfunction and constant tension [among the family]... runs a sordid subtext of incestuous desire." Senn cites several moments in the film, including Walter running his hands up Jane's arm, as well as his spoken obsession with her whereabouts, as suggesting that his character is sexually attracted to his daughter, and may have in fact sexually abused her.

In English Gothic: A Century of Horror Cinema (2000), Jonathan Rigby notes that "Whether Walter has returned from the grave, or was never dead at all, is neither here nor there. Instead, the film seems to work as an allegory about the persistence of patriarchy ... with the abusive patriarch bouncing back despite all attempts to kill him."

== Production ==
The script, written by Olaf Pooley, was originally titled The Velvet House and was loosely inspired by the film Les Diaboliques (1955).

Mitchell and Michael Gough were at the time well-known stage performers and Gough was a 'fixture' in British horror films. Rupert and Jane were played by Michael Gough's real-life son Simon and Simon's fiancée Sharon Gurney. The two married in 1970, before the film was released.

The film's £55,000 budget was raised from London-Cannon Films, a British company set up the American film distributor Cannon Films. The low budget meant that expenses had to be minimal, so an actual house was used for on-location filming, with the remainder shot at Merton Park Studios in London. Crucible of Horror was Ritelis' only movie, but he had 'a long and fruitful career as a television director". Filming started on 17 March 1969. The film's on-screen credits list a 1971 copyright statement for May Films, Ltd'; but The Corpse/Crucible of Horror was never registered for copyright.

According to the film's assistant director, Nicholas Granby, owing to prior obligations, director Viktors Ritelis was forced to depart the production prior to its completion, and producer Gabrielle Beaumont took on directorial responsibilities for the last several weeks of filming.

== Release ==
One of the film's two production companies, the American-based Cannon Group, produced the film under the title of their London branch, London-Cannon Films. Cannon Films handled distribution of the film in the United States, releasing it regionally as a double bill with Cauldron of Blood (1969), starring Boris Karloff. The double-bill opened in San Antonio, Texas beginning 19 July 1971. It later screened in Burlington, North Carolina beginning on 14 August 1971. The film opened theatrically in New York City on 11 November 1971.

The film was not submitted to the British Board of Film Classification (BBFC) until after the BBFC had changed 'the threshold of the X category' on 1 July 1970 when the minimum audience-member age for exhibition was raised from 16 to 18. The film was given its X certification on 19 December 1971 after unspecified cuts were made. It was subsequently released in the United Kingdom through Grand National Pictures on an X cert double-bill alongside Psycho Killer (1970). It screened on this double-bill in Manchester beginning 24 April 1972.

By the summer of 1973, Crucible of Horror was on the US drive-in theatre circuit. For example, it was shown on 1 and 2 June 1973, a Friday and Saturday, as the third film on a triple-bill at the Mt. Lebanon Drive-In Theatre in Washington, Pennsylvania. The other two films were the non-horror Fists of Fury (1972) and Prime Cut (1972). The film was later featured on the syndicated American TV programme Elvira's Movie Macabre on 27 November 1982. It was the 13th episode of the show's second series.

=== Home media ===
After its brief theatrical runs in the UK and US, the film has had sporadic official US VHS releases and several bootleg DVD releases. The very first VHS release was from Paragon Video in 1983. A later VHS release came from Goodtimes in 1987, using a battered and cut down 16mm print with the US "Crucible of Horror" title. This release was unlicensed, as it was presumed the title had fallen into public domain by that time. As MGM had assumed The Cannon Group catalog after Crédit Lyonnais took full control from Pathé Communications, MGM/UA Home Video put out an officially licensed release in 1993 and reissued in 1998, using a transfer made from an original film element with the US title. Despite being in a cropped 1.33:1 ratio, this release was considered the best available version to date and was the source for DVD releases put out by Trinty Home Entertainment and bootleg outfit Mr. Fat W Video.

Scream Factory announced plans to bring this title onto Blu-Ray, under licence from MGM. This release came out on April 10, 2018, using a restored 2k scan of the best available film element under its Crucible of Horror title, and presented in the original 1.66:1 widescreen ratio along with the films US theatrical trailer.

As of 2025, this title has not been released on video in the UK in any form. A Blu-ray release featuring a new 2K restoration is scheduled for April 2026 through Hammer Films' Hammer Presents line.

== Reception ==
Reviews of Crucible of Horror at the time of its premiere in the US tended to be favourable. Howard Simpson of The New York Times attended the opening night of Cauldron of Blood and Crucible of Horror and writes in his review that the former is 'painful to watch' and that 'the one to see, without running' is the latter. He states that Crucible of Horror is 'superbly directed by Viktors Ritelis and beautifully played by Yvonne Mitchell, Sharon Gurney and Michael Gough' and notes that 'for tight, merciless tension and venom, the movie is uncommonly effective and engrossing'. He adds that 'the twist of a civilized, very British fadeout ... is the most horrifying thing of all. Quite a picture. Quite'.

BoxOffice magazine also praised the film upon its release, saying that 'no one can deny that [it] isn't effectively done.' The anonymous review says that 'Director Viktor Ritelis livened the pace with fast-cut flashbacks, psychedelic dream sequences and some well-mounted horror touches at the end'. It notes the high quality of the acting and reports that 'Young Sharon Gurney gets introductory billing, celebrating the occasion by plunging in with a nude scene, hysterics and a sharp sense of defying her elders'. The magazine rates Crucible of Horror as 'good' on its poor-to-very-good scale].

Ann Guarino of The New York Daily News gave a middling review, awarding the film two stars out of four and cited its "deadly pace," adding that it "will barely keep you awake."

== Sources ==
- Rigby, Jonathan (2000). English Gothic: A Century of Horror Cinema. London: Reynolds & Hearn.
- Hamilton, John (2012). X-Cert: The British Independent Horror Film 1951-1970. Bristol: Hemlock Books. ISBN 978-0-955-77745-5.
- Senn, Bryan (2019). "Twice the Thrills! Twice the Chills!": Horror and Science Fiction Double Features, 1955-1974. Jefferson, North Carolina: McFarland. ISBN 978-1-476-63571-2.
