= The Newcomers (TV series) =

British TV soap opera, 1965–1969

- Genre: Soap opera
- Created by: Colin Morris
- Theme music composer: John Barry (Fancy Dance, 1963)
- Country of origin: United Kingdom
- Original language: English
- No. of episodes: 430 (425 missing)

Production
- Producers: Verity Lambert; Ronald Travers; Bill Sellars
- Production locations: Riverside 1, BBC Birmingham
- Camera setup: Video, multiple-camera setup
- Running time: 25 minutes

Original release
- Network: BBC One
- Release: 5 October 1965 – 13 November 1969

The Newcomers is a late 1960s BBC soap opera, which dealt with the subject of a London family, the Coopers, who moved to a housing estate in the fictional country town of Angleton. It was broadcast in biweekly half-hour episodes from October 1965 until November 1969. It was initially produced by Verity Lambert.

== Series outline ==
A fictional light industrial manufacturing company called Eden Brothers decides to relocate to the rural location. There are conflicts with the older members of the existing community, as well as some lighter moments as urbanites encounter "country characters". Many of the relocated workers have trouble living outside the city. As the series progresses, problems on the factory floor spill over into the community. Throughout this the Coopers strive to raise their daughter and two sons, who are having their own issues. The Cooper and Harker families were the initial focus of the series. The on-screen sudden death of the character of Ellis Cooper led to a gradual shift away from the Coopers, who by the end of the serial barely featured.

A change of the managing director of Eden Bros to Andrew Kerr heralded the arrival of his daughter Kirsty, played by Jenny Agutter, but only during her school holidays.

Only five complete editions are known to have survived:

- Episode 51 – Original transmission 29 March 1966
- Episode 59 – Original transmission 26 April 1966
- Episode 166 – Original transmission 5 May 1967
- Episode 172 – Original transmission 26 May 1967
- Episode 222 – Original transmission 7 December 1967

== Cast ==
- Alan Browning as Ellis Cooper
- Maggie Fitzgibbon as Vivienne Cooper
- Jeremy Bulloch as Phillip Cooper
- Judy Geeson as Maria Cooper
- Raymond Hunt as Lance Cooper
- Gladys Henson as Grandma Hamilton
- Robert Brown as Bert Harker
- June Bland as Vera Harker
- David Janson as Jimmy Harker
- Wendy Richard as Joyce Harker
- Robin Bailey as Andrew Kerr
- Heather Chasen as Caroline Kerr
- Jenny Agutter as Kirsty Kerr
- Campbell Singer as Henry Burroughs
- Gerald Cross as Arnold Tripp
- Jack Watling as Hugh Robertson
- Mary Kenton as Olivia Robertson
- Deborah Watling as Julie Robertson
- Paul Bartlett as Adrian Robertson
- Robert Bartlett as Michael Robertson
- Vanda Godsell as Katie Heenan
- Tony Steedman as Arthur Huntley
- Naomi Chance as Amelia Huntley/Amelia Claythorne
- Sally Lahee as Eunice Huntley
- Patrick Connor as Peter Connelly
- Michael Collins as Jeff Langley
- Sandra Payne as Janet Langley
- Joan Newell as Mrs Langley
- Glynn Edwards as George Harbottle
- Hilda Braid as Mrs Harbottle
- Stephen Grives as Tim Harbottle
- Margaret Nolan as Mercedes
- Michael Standing as Tom Lloyd
- Helen Cotterill as Betty Lloyd
- Keith Smith as Dick Alderbeach
- Anthony Verner as Sydney Huxley
- Mark Eden as Jeremy Crowe
- Patsy Smart as Mary Grange
- Megs Jenkins as Mrs Penrose
- Eileen Helsby as Prudence Penrose
- Victor Platt as Charles Penrose
- Julian Somers as William Pargeter
- Derek Benfield as Mr. Hutchinson

== Production ==
The show was recorded principally in the BBC's West London studios, mainly Riverside 1, and also at BBC Birmingham Studios, with external scenes filmed in Haverhill, a town in southwest Suffolk, which itself expanded rapidly in the 1950s and 1960s through residents moving from London. The opening sequences of the first episode showed the Cooper family driving to their new home: this was actually Thaxted in Essex. The cast included several actors who later achieved wider fame, including Alan Browning (later seen in Coronation Street), Maggie Fitzgibbon, Judy Geeson, Jenny Agutter and Wendy Richard. In two episodes, the group Jimmy Powell and the Five Dimensions were featured and appeared at the pub (they were billed as 'the New Dimensions'). They performed their new Decca 45 "I Just Can't Get Over You".
