= All Creatures Great and Small (1978 TV series) =

British veterinary TV series (1978-90)

- Cast of All Creatures Great and Small, c. 1978: Christopher Timothy, Robert Hardy, Peter Davison, Mary Hignett and Carol Drinkwater
- Genre: Comedy drama
- Created by: Bill Sellars
- Based on: If Only They Could Talk and; It Shouldn't Happen to a Vet; by James Herriot
- Written by: Johnny Byrne; Ted Rhodes; Alfred Shaughnessy; Terry Hodgkinson
- Starring: Christopher Timothy; Robert Hardy; Peter Davison; Carol Drinkwater; Mary Hignett; John McGlynn; Margaretta Scott; Lynda Bellingham
- Theme music composer: Johnny Pearson
- Country of origin: United Kingdom
- Original language: English
- No. of series: 7
- No. of episodes: 90 (list of episodes)

Production
- Producer: Bill Sellars
- Production location: Yorkshire Dales
- Running time: 48 minutes

Original release
- Network: BBC1
- Release: 8 January 1978 – 24 December 1990

Related
- All Creatures Great and Small (2020 TV series)

All Creatures Great and Small is a British television series made by the BBC and based on the books of the British veterinary surgeon Alf Wight, who wrote under the pseudonym James Herriot. Set in the Yorkshire Dales and beginning in the mid-1930s, it stars Christopher Timothy as Herriot, Robert Hardy as Siegfried Farnon (based on Donald Sinclair), the proprietor of the Skeldale House surgery, and Peter Davison as Siegfried's "little brother", Tristan (based on Brian Sinclair). Herriot's wife, Helen (based on Joan Wight), was initially played by Carol Drinkwater and in the later series by Lynda Bellingham.

The series had two runs: the original (1978 to 1980, based directly on Herriot's books) was for three series; the second (1988 to 1990, filmed with original scripts but generally regarded as a continuation of the 1978 series) for four. The supporting cast, both recurring and one-offs, numbers over 600, most of whom appear as farmers or clients of the surgery. The series was produced throughout its run by Bill Sellars, who was tasked in early 1977 by the BBC with the creation of a television series from Herriot's first two novels, If Only They Could Talk (1970) and It Shouldn't Happen to a Vet (1972), using the title of the 1975 film adaptation. It is part of a series of movies and television series based on Herriot's novels. The novels were written in an episodic style, with each chapter generally containing a short story within the ongoing narrative of Herriot's life. This format greatly facilitated their adaptation for a television series.

In 2020, a remake, also titled All Creatures Great and Small, was produced by Playground Entertainment for Channel 5 in the United Kingdom and PBS in the United States.

== Cast ==
=== Central characters ===
- James Herriot – Christopher Timothy (series 1–7, 90 episodes)
- Siegfried Farnon – Robert Hardy (series 1–7, 90 episodes)
- Tristan Farnon – Peter Davison (series 1–7, 65 episodes)
- Helen Herriot (née Alderson) – Carol Drinkwater (series 1–3) and Lynda Bellingham (series 4–7) (86 episodes)
- Mrs. (Edna) Hall – Mary Hignett (series 1–3)

==== James Herriot ====
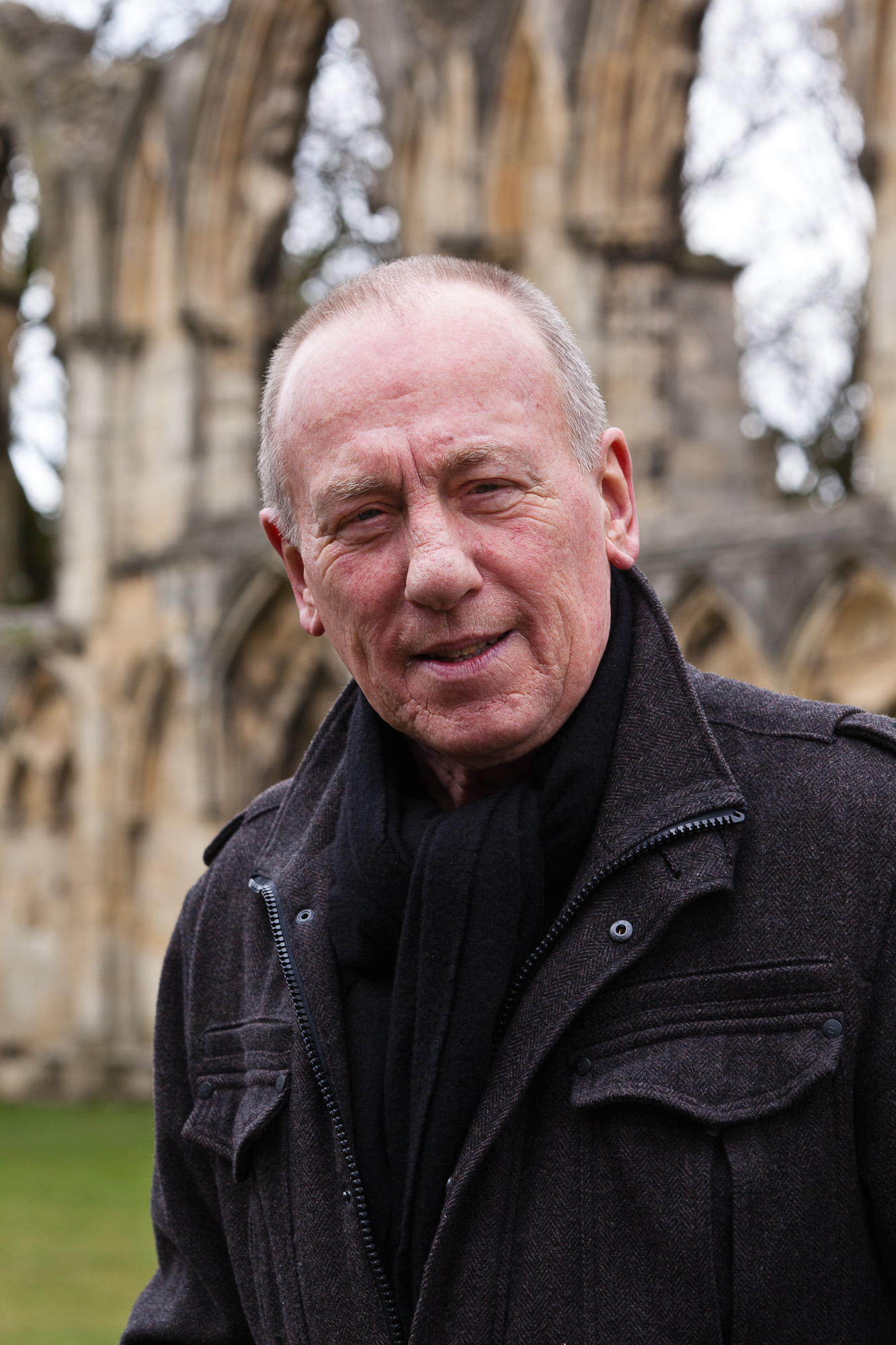
Christopher Timothy played the leading role of James Herriot

The leading role is played by Christopher Timothy. Bill Sellars had wanted to give the role to Timothy from the outset, but the powers that be wanted to cast the role. Sellars, instead, asked Timothy if he would accept the role of Tristan Farnon. "I had a wife, I had children, I had a mortgage to pay, and I wasn't working. So I said, 'No. It's Herriot or nothing.'" Timothy put everything on the line. "I got home one night, at about 9 o'clock. My wife was washing up in the kitchen. I walked into the kitchen and she said, without turning round, 'You've got the Herriot part.'" Timothy also stated that, after all of the roles had been cast except that of Herriot, one of the directors said, "Why don't we give [the Herriot part] to Christopher Timothy and make him a name?" In 2003, Timothy said that Alf Wight wrote him a letter after the series started, saying "You are the Herriot I wrote about."

Timothy played the lead role for the full 90 episodes. He later recalled meeting the author, Alf Wight, who had "a soft, lilting Scottish accent – though I was told to keep my speech neutral to retain the universality of the part. Which I thought was complete bollocks."

==== Siegfried Farnon ====
Siegfried Farnon, based on Wight's real-life professional partner Donald Sinclair, is played by Robert Hardy. Writer Michael Russell sums up the character's composition thus: "He is capricious, cantankerous, whimsical, arbitrary, unreasonable, unpredictable, ill-tempered, extravagant, effusive, contradictory, etc., yet in the midst of all that, the most loyal and caring of friends." According to Wight's son, James, the Siegfried character in the novels and TV series was considerably toned down, and that Sinclair was even more eccentric than the Herriot books portrayed. The New York Times also confirmed Sinclair's eccentric real-life behaviour: he once fired a shotgun during a dinner party, informing his guests that it was time to leave.

The cast met for the first time in June 1977. "We all had a meeting together in London," recalled Hardy, "and Bill Sellars said, 'Now, these characters are all based on real people. None of you are to meet these people until we have made at least three episodes.' So I immediately got into my car and fled up to Yorkshire to meet my man, Donald Sinclair. I was intrigued beyond measure by him. He was a true eccentric and, like all true eccentrics, he had no idea himself how odd he was! He absolutely hated what I did, because he had no idea he was at all like that, but when we'd really got into it and were producing them at high speed, his friends used to come to me and say, 'You've got him, that's him.'"

A bachelor at the time, Siegfried took over Skeldale House from another vet, named Grant. In the 1983 Christmas Special, Siegfried meets an old flame, Caroline Fisher, who has returned after living in America. They later marry and have children, as mentioned in the series 7 episode "Hampered".

"Some writers considered [Siegfried] an explosion, and all they needed to do was light the fuse and—bang—he would lose his temper, which was a great bore," explained Hardy. "So I ended up occasionally writing my own scenes. I did make a nuisance of myself, and I'm afraid I made enemies amongst some of the younger writers. But that's necessary. Out of these battles come, if you're lucky, quality. It needs steel and a stone to make a spark."

As with Christopher Timothy, Robert Hardy's character appeared in all 90 episodes of the series.

==== Tristan Farnon ====
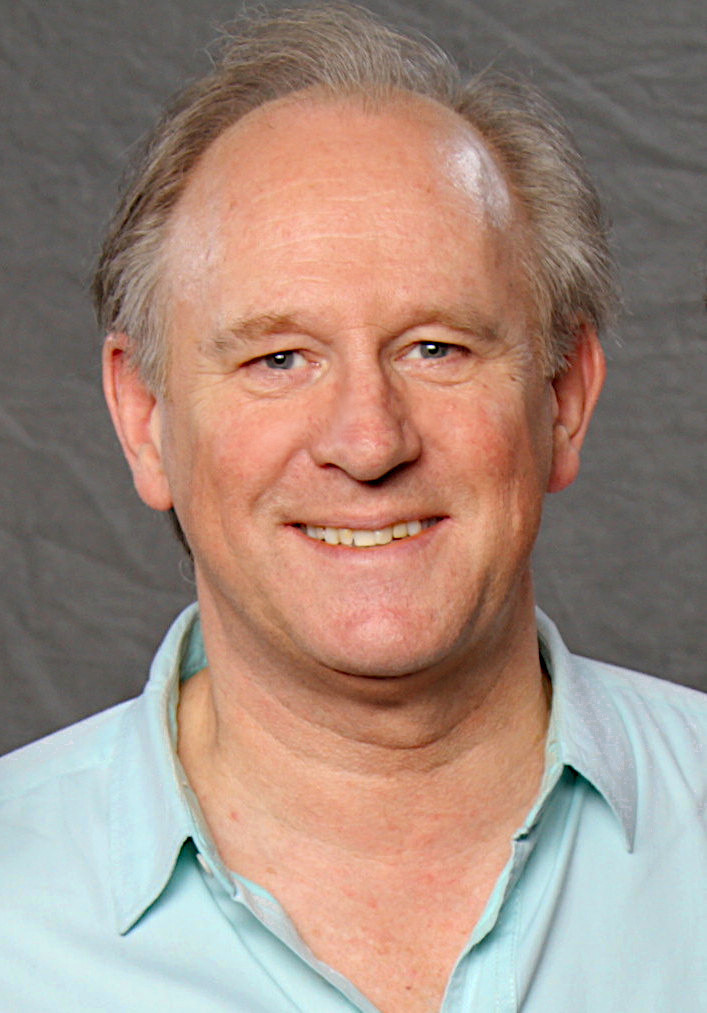
Peter Davison played Tristan, the younger Farnon brother

Peter Davison played Siegfried's boyish younger brother, Tristan (affectionately called "Mister Tristan" by housekeeper Edna Hall), whose character was based on Brian Sinclair. Tristan was initially considered a "semi-regular" character, booked to appear in five out of thirteen episodes.

"I ended up in more of the series because Robert Hardy really liked the way the two brothers worked," continued Davison. "It gave him more scope for what he wanted to do. I've never learned so much from anyone as I learned from Robert, because I've just never worked with anyone else like him. He is an extraordinary actor. He would never do the same thing twice. In two takes he would give an entirely different performance—he would bark where he had whispered before. I had to keep on my toes, but I managed to keep up with him, I think, though obviously I'm not on his level."

Tristan likes nothing more than slipping out to the Drovers Arms for a pint or two of Best Yorkshire Bitter whenever the opportunity presents itself, one of several "intensely irritating habits" that annoy his brother. Others include his penchant for sleeping late, failing his exams, and spending too much time chasing women. In the episode "The Prodigal Returns", when Siegfried mistakenly thinks "little brother" is impersonating a client on the other end of the telephone line, a few home truths come out: "Mr Biggins, if you've got it into your head that young Mr Farnon is a veterinary surgeon of any quality whatsoever, let me disabuse you of that idea immediately. He is nothing more than a slothful, drunken, incompetent lecher who will soon be seeking employment elsewhere."

Tristan's party piece is a rendition of "The Mad Conductor" (Benito Mussolini conducting the Neurasthenic Strings), which he performs in "Out of Practice" and "...The Healing Touch". In the former episode, he downs a pint of beer. "That was real beer!" Davison said. "I don't think coloured water would have worked for some reason, and I don't know if they had the alcohol-free beer then?" As for "The Mad Conductor", Davison continued: "I have no idea what I was doing! I just went a bit nuts really."

"Meeting [Brian Sinclair] was useful because I'd been worried about how to make my Tristan endearing, even though he behaved appallingly, and now, shaking his hand, I could see how Brian could have managed it."

"Peter was so good. We worked well together, " said Hardy of his on-screen sibling. "In the early filming days, I realised he was watching me. He watched and watched, and I said, 'Why are you looking at me all the time?' and he said, 'Because we're brothers, and I want to catch some sort of family thing that I can use so that it's obvious we are of the same family.' I was very impressed by that. He was very, very good."

==== Helen Herriot ====
Helen Herriot (née Alderson) is played by Carol Drinkwater in the first three series and two specials, then by Lynda Bellingham in the final four series. (Bellingham became pregnant with her youngest son, Robert, during series 5, so she was confined to bed scenes for several episodes, with a hole cut out of the mattress to hide her bump.)

==== Housekeepers ====
Mary Hignett plays housekeeper Edna Hall in the first three series, with Mrs Hubbard (Marjorie Suddell, 1983 Christmas Special), Mrs Greenlaw (Judy Wilson, 1985 special and series 4, episodes 1–5) and Mrs Alton (Jean Heywood) (series 7) inheriting the roles. (A housekeeper by the name of Mary preceded Mrs Hall, who is a widow after the death of her husband, Arthur.)

=== Timothy accident ===
With the amount of screen time to fill, the series quickly became much more of an ensemble show, developing all the characters considerably. In particular, the role of Tristan was significantly increased. This was partly because Christopher Timothy was injured in a car accident on Boxing Day 1977 during a fortnight break between the recording of "Out of Practice" and "Nothing Like Experience" in the first series. As a result, the actor was largely restricted to studio scenes, which meant that all the scenes involving location filming be rewritten and include Davison. "I remember Christopher's accident vividly," recalled Robert Hardy. "It was a ghastly shock, and one thought, 'Well, that's the end of that. We shan't be going on.'" Timothy remembers: "The news from the hierarchy was: 'Tragic news about Christopher. Glad he's okay. Send his wife some flowers and re-cast.'"

"One of the plans was to make me James Herriot," said Peter Davison, "and then re-cast Tristan." Bill Sellars refused this option: "I said, 'I'm not doing that. It's an awful waste. We'll find another way around it.' We took the rest of the series apart, scene by scene, and all the scenes that [Peter Davison] was involved in, I extracted and took them down to the hospital, threw them on the hospital bed, and said, 'Learn those.'" This accounts for the three-week break in transmission dates between episodes 11 ("Bulldog Breed") and 12 ("Practice Makes Perfect") of the first series.

"I was plated and screwed instead of plastered," recalled Timothy, "and I was back at work in nine weeks—which was insane, in retrospect: I could barely walk, I was terrified, I'd lost a lot of weight and everybody worked round me."

"They would prop him up against a surgery table," said Peter Davison. "Then he'd start having a conversation with me. And then, at some point in the scene, I would have to move my eyes slowly across the room while two people would come in and literally carry him across to the next position."

"As [series 2] started filming, Chris had managed to find a way of walking that concealed his limp, as long as he affected a kind of John Wayne swagger, something he grew more attached to over the next couple of years," added Davison.

=== Recurring characters ===
Margaretta Scott appears as the rich dog-owner Mrs Pumphrey. One of her staff, irked at having to look after his employer's pampered Pekingese, Tricki Woo, is William Hodgekin (Teddy Turner). He longs for it to "have its chips" and succumb to illness, which is why he grumbles whenever the vets pay a visit.

In series 4, new vet Calum Buchanan (John McGlynn), based on Herriot's real-life assistant Brian Nettleton, is introduced. He and Tristan know each other from veterinary school in Edinburgh. He marries fellow Scot Deirdre McEwan (Andrea Gibb) early in series 6, and the pair emigrate to Nova Scotia.

The Herriot children, Jimmy and Rosie, are played by several actors in their various stints. Jimmy is portrayed by Harry Brayne in the 1983 special. Oliver Wilson takes over the role from the 1985 special until the end of series 5. Paul Lyon plays him in the final series. Rosie, meanwhile, is played by Rebecca Smith from the 1985 special until the end of series 5. Alison Lewis takes over for the final series.

James's early rival for Helen's affections, the well-off Richard Edmundson, was played by Norman Mann.

== Plots ==
Ninety episodes (including the three Christmas Specials) were broadcast over seven series. Each episode is 48 minutes in length.

== Production ==
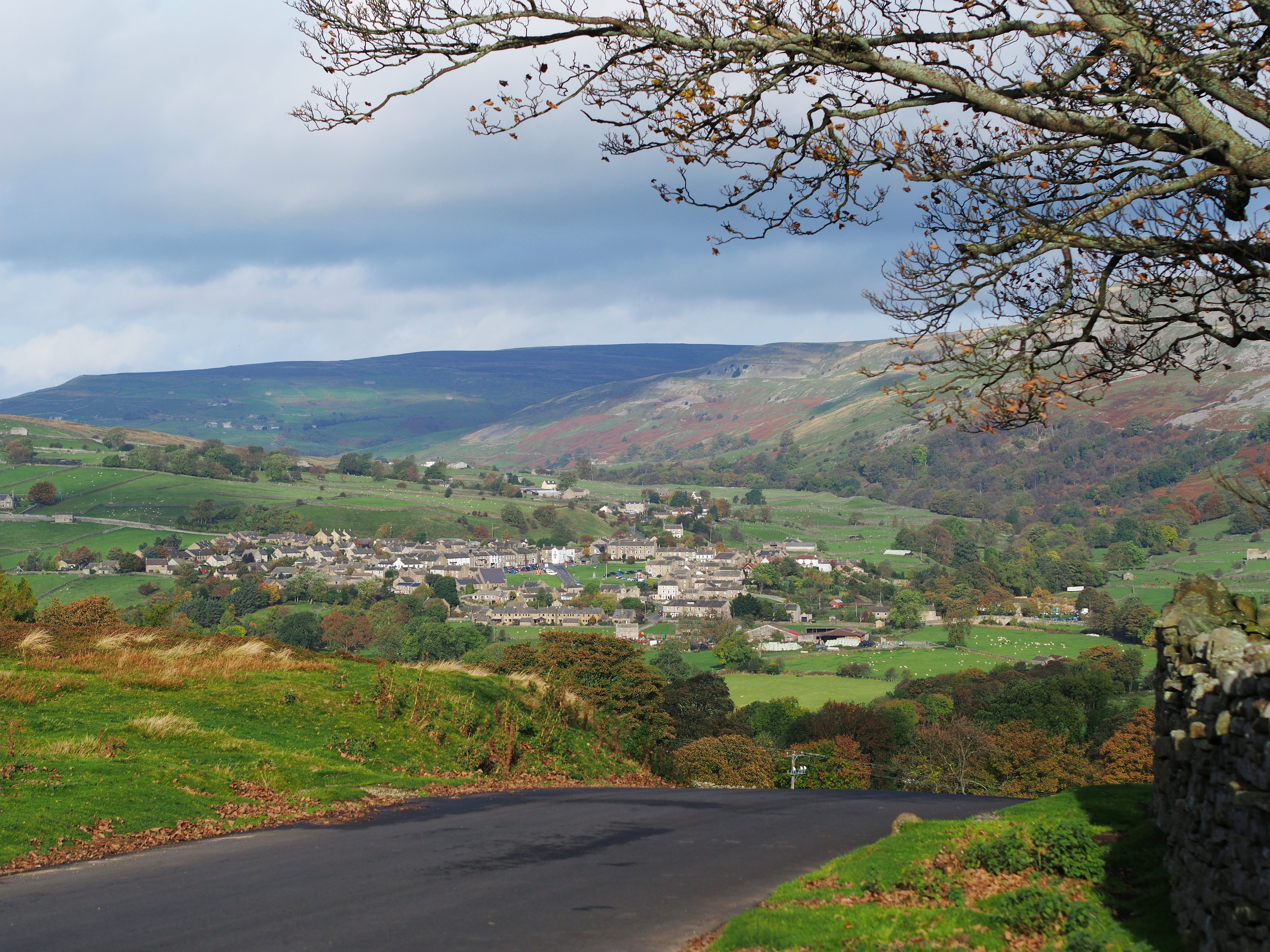
Robert Hardy preferred to stay by himself in the village of Reeth, about fifteen miles from where the rest of the cast was based

After a meet-and-greet for the cast in June 1977, filming began the following month. "The first thing we did was a filming block on location in North Yorkshire," explained Peter Davison. "I just remember driving up and seeing this beautiful countryside that I'd never seen before. It was untouched. Initially we stayed in a little place called West Witton in Wensleydale, in between Leyburn and Askrigg." Robert Hardy, meanwhile, stayed fifteen miles by road to the northeast, at the Punch Bowl Inn in Low Row, near Reeth. "He'd found this rather grand little bed and breakfast place," confirmed Davison. "He would invite us around for dinner and would normally be sat there working on the script and would go in the next day, bang it on the table and say, 'I've rewritten this, here it is!' It was usually better."

Norman Mann, who played Richard Edmundson, recalled: "When we were up in Yorkshire, most of us stayed at the Heifer Hotel in Wensleydale, whilst Robert Hardy stayed in a different hotel. But he used to send a car over to pick us all up and we'd have dinner with him. He was the established name and he always made everybody feel so welcome."

"The filming block lasted about five weeks and was a social whirlwind. I drank too much and stayed up too late," continued Davison. There were no rehearsals for location filming. "I had to learn my lines in the make-up chair the following morning."

"Looking back at those early episodes, it's interesting to see what was accepted—or, rather, what isn't now. Every living-room scene involved glass after glass of whisky being poured and knocked back, and I was barely ever without a cigarette. Of course, the whisky was really only water with drops of burnt sugar, and I never inhaled the Woodbines. The beer, for some reason, was real, which in the drunken pub scenes caused problems."

"Our routine in the beginning was that we would rehearse for a week [at BBC Park Western] in North Acton," explained Carol Drinkwater. "Then we would have Saturday off. Then we would have to be in Birmingham on the Sunday night and Pebble Mill on Monday morning to do the interior studio scenes there. If there was filming, we would do a six-week block where we would all go north. That's how it started, until eventually Robert Hardy said he wanted it all to be on film, so for the specials we shot the interiors in Yorkshire on a sound stage on film and made it pretty much identical to the studios that we had at Pebble Mill."

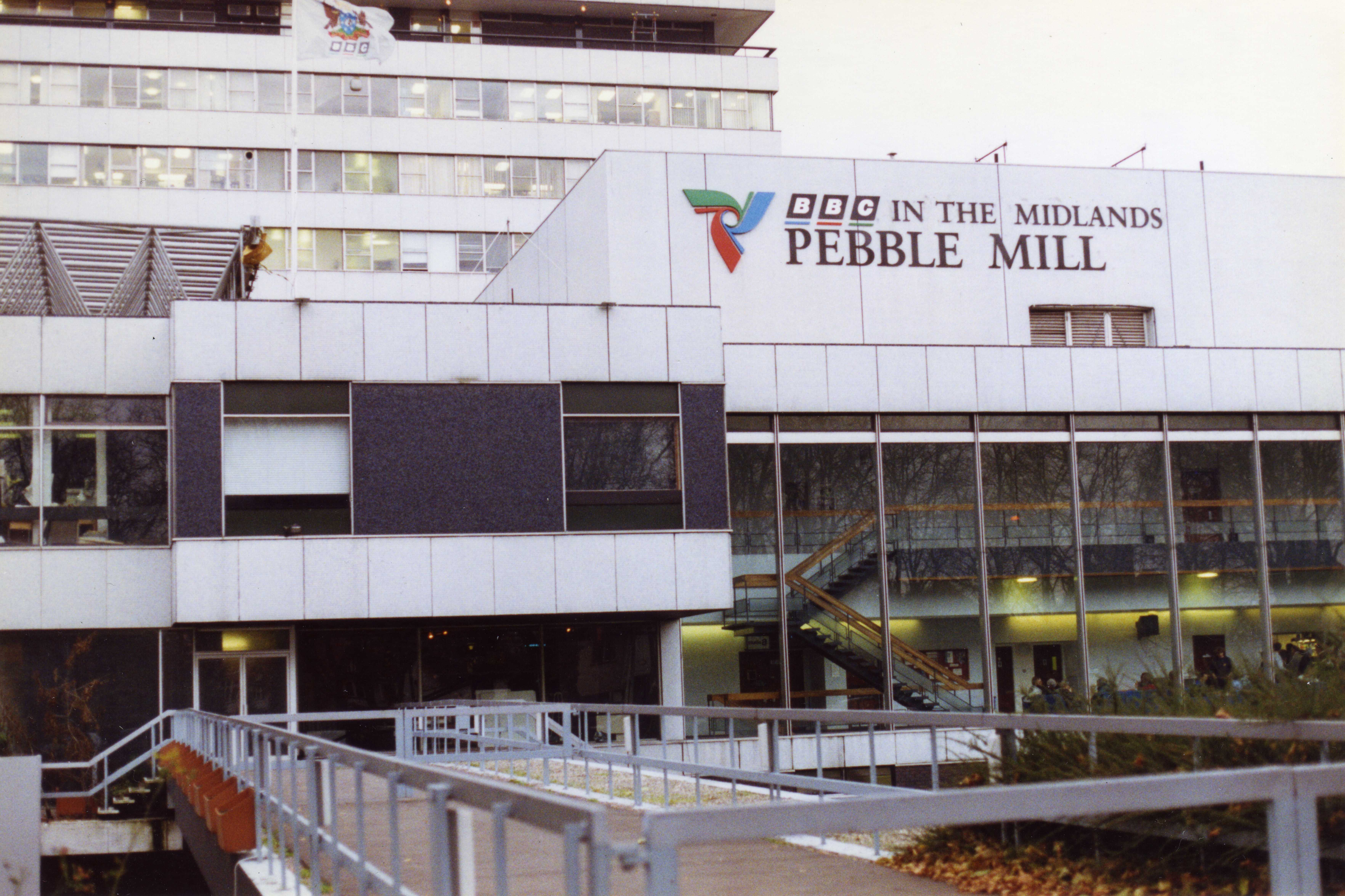
Pebble Mill Studios in Birmingham

Peter Davison's memories of the recording process: "We had this weird process where we would rehearse for ten days in London, and you'd go up for two or three days to the studio at Pebble Mill. In those days they weren't done in the rehearse-record system. We did it in the old-style way that they used to do when they were doing live television. So we would rehearse all day, and then from 7:30pm you would record, theoretically, as if it were live: sequentially and with no gaps. It never used to work out like that, but that was the idea behind it! But there was no recording in the day, which meant there was always this blind panic at night."

"Normally after the seventh and final day of rehearsal, the cast and production team would travel to Birmingham to check into their hotel and digs," recalled assistant floor manager David Tilley. "The production team would meet in the studio that evening to see what state the studio was in. We'd need to check that the set building had been completed and if the sets were dressed ready for camera rehearsals to start the next day. The good thing about using the Birmingham studio was that they were excellent in design and set building. I liked working there, and they had terrific pride in All Creatures. The first day—in this case the Sunday—the cameras, sound, lighting, designers, scenery changes and action properties, costume and makeup rehearsed all the scenes technically. On the second day, camera rehearsal continued in the morning. After lunch, all five cameras were synchronised and the recording commenced on scenes that had already been rehearsed. We also allowed for discontinuous recording with breaks between scenes. Earlier in the 1970s, programmes were recorded continuously with very few breaks, but by this time two-machine editing had been established using two-inch-wide tapes. All the 16mm film inserts had also been transferred to videotape. The sequences could be seen on monitors in the studio during breaks in recording, which allowed the cast, designers and production team to check for continuity from scenes filmed months before so that they could match the studio scenes."

"Continuity pictures became so important," explained make-up artist Maggie Thomas. "For instance, we would always see the vets leaving and arriving at [Skeldale House], although we never ever went inside the real house on location and the costume and make-up had to match up exactly several weeks later when we saw them arrive back in the studio set of [Skeldale House] hall." "Continuity is one of the greatest challenges for a costume designer," added June Hudson. "It is one of the hardest things to get right. I would take Polaroids and stick them in my script, next to the scenes, so that when you came to do the studio, you just look at that photograph. It was the only way to do it, otherwise you were never, ever going to get it right. The smallest details, whether a top button was done up, if they wore rings on a different hand, if they had a watch on... the viewer notices, so it is a very tough job."

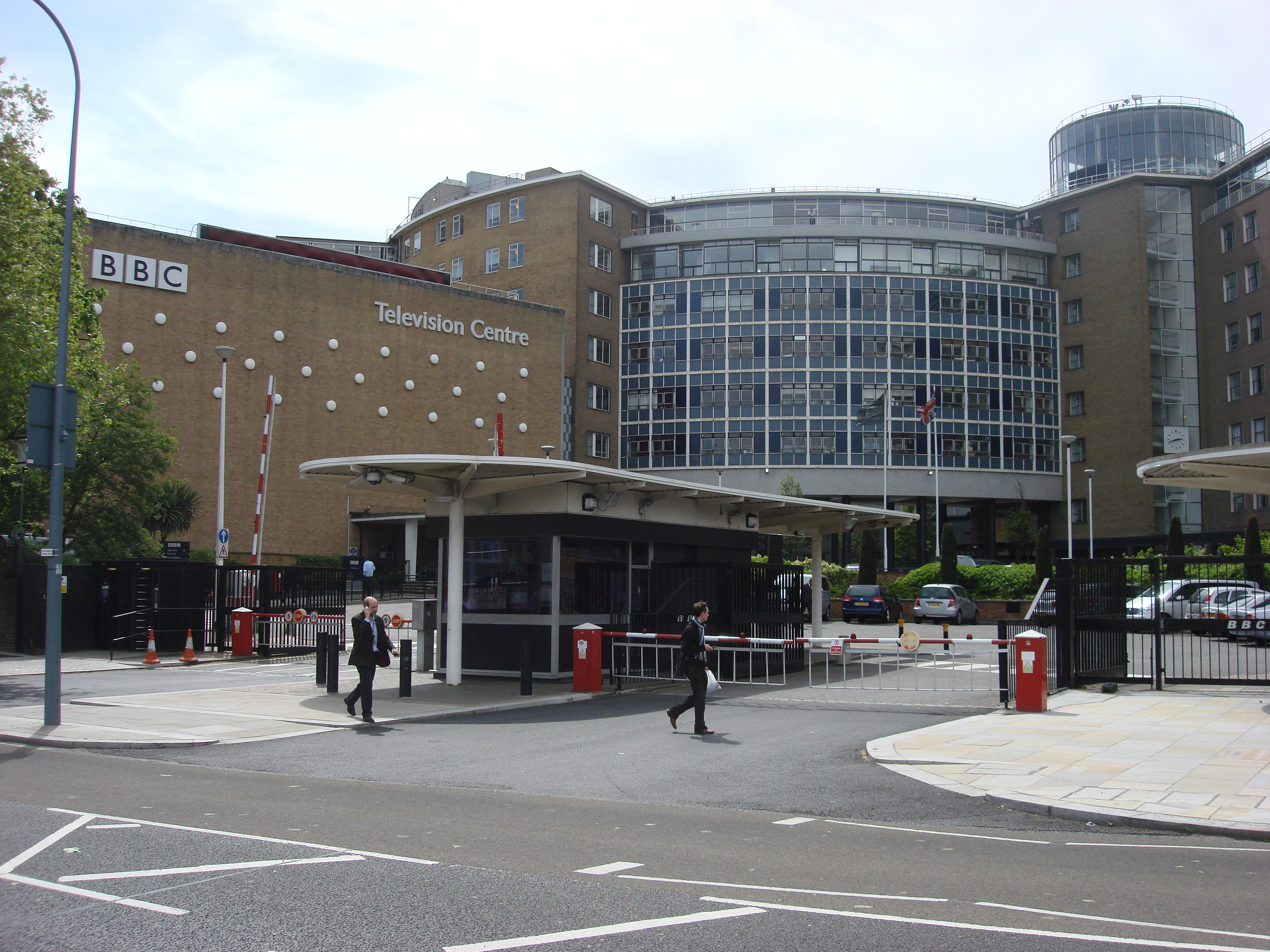
BBC Television Centre, West London

The series 5 episode "Two of a Kind" was the last episode to be filmed at Television Centre. "We moved All Creatures back to Pebble Mill for the sixth series because we found Pebble Mill a bit more flexible and amenable, whereas Television Centre was quite hard lined in terms of union regulations, so trying to just squeeze that extra bit of time out, or change the lunch hours, and get people to agree to that was a lot more achievable in Birmingham," explained production associate Tony Redston. "We also moved from film to 'lightweight' video cameras for the location filming of the sixth series, so for the first time we'd have monitors for instant playback on location. This was double-sided, because whilst it meant you could immediately check what you'd been shooting, the downside was everyone then wanted to stand around the monitor and check every take."

Peter Davison concurred about the feel of Pebble Mill. "Unlike Television Centre, Pebble Mill had an intimate family atmosphere. Everyone was on first-name terms, and even though I had a dressing room, I would still spend most of my time loitering in the make-up department."

"The studio recording took place between 2:30 and 6:00pm, and then again in the evening, 7:30 to 10:00," continued David Tilley. "The recording had to end at precisely 10:00 and all scenes had to be completed. No overruns were allowed as the cost of overtime with such a large cast, technicians, designers and production staff would have been tremendous, so it was very disciplined. At the end of the studio [recording], the recording and film inserts were then laid onto a master videotape."

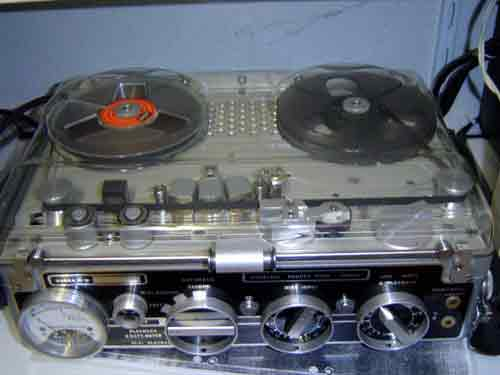
The early days of filming for All Creatures pre-dated multi-mic radio microphones. A Nagra mixer captured sound from the boom mic and would later be synchronised with the video

Soundman Alex Christison reminisced about getting the sound right on the show: "The main problem with All Creatures was that we are talking about the days before multi-mic radio microphones were available, so you couldn't just scatter personal mics around each actor and mix accordingly. We were also recording in mono audio, so I didn't even have another track to play with like the dramas do these days with split track. Basically I relied on my boom swinger to get my sound. We'd done away with the old sync lead by then, thank God, which meant I wasn't joined up to the camera; the boom mic would be connected to my Nagra mixer and would be recorded separately to picture. The clapperboard really did concentrate the minds in those days because it was quite a costly process if you got it wrong. Because the cast were so good, they would see the boom in the corner of their eye and know when it was going to be over their head—then they would start speaking." Separate crews were used for studio recording and exteriors.

In early 1978, news came from London: "The BBC, planning all their schedules and choosing their programmes, were pestering me after the first series," remembered Bill Sellars. "'We want thirteen more episodes now!' I'd say, 'Where are we going to get all this from, Ted?'" "They commissioned a second series," explained Peter Davison. "This time they wanted the show to go out in the autumn slot, which meant we would barely finish the first series before starting the next. Chris's leg was improving all the time, but we had lost six or seven weeks, and so had a three-week break in transmission in March to allow post-production to catch up."

The programme initially ran for three series, with each episode adapting one or two of the Herriot stories—usually a story thread centred on James, and a second centred on Siegfried or Tristan. The continuity of the show followed the general arc of the books: James's arrival at Darrowby in 1937, his growing experience as a vet, his humorous attempts at romance with Helen, and their eventual marriage. The programme ended in 1980 at the stage where the characters were drawn into the Second World War, the final exterior shots broadcast filmed during the winter of 1979. This completed the adaptation of all the novels which Alf Wight had written up to that point. Two 90-minute Christmas Specials were subsequently made, in 1983 and 1985, set after the war and based on his 1981 book The Lord God Made Them All. At the end of the filming of the 1985 special, Christopher Timothy and Carol Drinkwater were asked if they thought that was the end of the series. "I'm fairly certain it is, yes," said Timothy. "There's very, very little material left." But surely there is another animal story every day? "It's a case of what James Herriot has written, though," replied Drinkwater. "He will, indeed, only allow us to use what is written. Which, I think, is fair."

"By the end of 1986, it was agreed that the original cast, minus Carol Drinkwater, would re-assemble to film another series," said Davison.

Three years later, the programme was, indeed, revived, after Sellars was able to persuade Alf Wight to allow new scripts to be written around the existing characters, but not directly based on the Herriot books, with some story lines repeated from the first run. The revived series was a co-production with the BBC in partnership with A&E and the Australian Broadcasting Corporation. Robert Hardy, though, had one stipulation about his returning to his role: he wanted Roger Davenport to write some of the scripts.

The revival, set beginning in 1949, ran for four more series, taking the characters up to Christmas 1953. Peter Davison was busy with other projects and was seen far less frequently in these newer series, with the character of Tristan leaving for Ireland at one point before returning after several episodes. He left again after that (he is only seen in one episode of the sixth series), before returning for the majority of the final series.

Regarding Carol Drinkwater's decision not to return to the series: "Bill Sellars was very, very cross with me for leaving. I think he thought I had been ungrateful. I'd given everything I could and I couldn't think where else I could take the role, because there was no more material. I wasn't leaving in any kind of spiteful thing; it had nothing to do with Chris and I, which is, of course, what everyone thought. Our split was all very amicable. Chris and I, and his wife Annie, are still good friends—there is no problem there. The BBC was so angry with me, they put a ban on using me. So they re-cast and another actress got the role. I was terribly upset because it was a wonderful role and would have been very good for me. I must say now, looking back on my career, it's one of the few things in my life I would do differently, and I wouldn't have left."

The revived series gradually became more based around the development of the central characters—particularly after the introduction of Calum and Deirdre, with their romance and subsequent marriage—and it mainly focused on the activities inside Skeldale House, rather than being a series about a veterinary practice. For the final series, all of the new characters were dropped (including Calum and Deirdre), and the series returned to its 1970s roots, focusing once more on the animals. The final broadcast was another Christmas Special, in 1990.

"I was glad when we stopped," said Robert Hardy. "I'd had enough. But I did love playing the character. There was some wonderful writing in the early stories, but later there was some which I always tried to change and, in the end, I made up a lot of my own stuff. I had been longing to leave because the filming conditions were so bad, but each time I eventually made up my mind to carry on. I don't know whether I was right or wrong."

The script editor for 42 of the 90 episodes was Ted Rhodes. "I couldn't have done any of it without Ted Rhodes. He was marvellous," said Bill Sellars. "He was a brilliant script editor. He spent his lifetime as a script editor and he had so many ideas. He knew how to put a script together. He knew what the beginning was, he knew the middle and he knew the end, and he could really weave those together to create one whole. They were never disjointed."

In 2007, an unfilmed script by the show's script editor Johnny Byrne was recovered and presented to the BBC as a possible Christmas reunion episode, but the BBC did not commission it. Peter Davison joked, "Maybe they just thought we were too decrepit, I don't know!"

Over 18–20 December 2011, the BBC screened a three-episode prequel, Young James Herriot, about Herriot's time at university, with Iain De Caestecker in the title role. Co-stars included Amy Manson and Tony Curran.

=== Locations ===
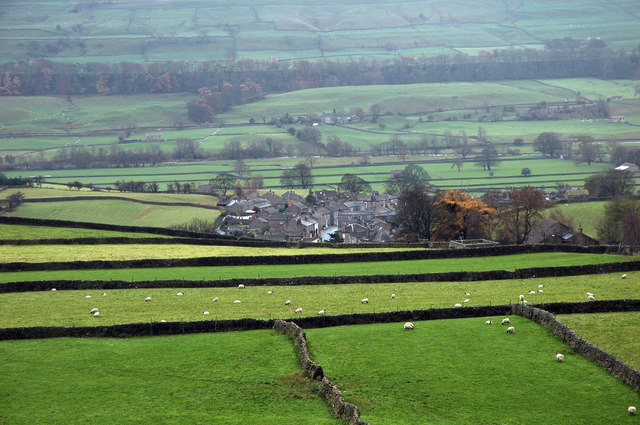
Askrigg, looking south towards Addlebrough fell

All exterior scenes were filmed in North Yorkshire, mostly in the village of Askrigg, which doubled for the fictional Darrowby, and Bainbridge. Addlebrough, a 481-metre-high (1,578 ft) fell to the south of both villages, is seen prominently in several scenes. Other locations included Swaledale, Arkengarthdale and Wensleydale, as well as Langthwaite; "the Red Lion pub was used for some scenes". "We would take over Askrigg and drive the very few motorists crazy by stopping the traffic," remembered Peter Davison. Indeed, three quarters of the way through the second run the crew was banned from filming in the village due to the disruption it was causing to the lives of the residents.

Filming also took place at some of the Dales' countless farmsteads—the same ones that Alf Wight visited in the 1960s and 1970s, although the names of villages, farms and people were changed. Exterior shots were originally to be filmed in Derbyshire's Peak District, but Robert Hardy took offence to the plan and threatened to walk out of the producer's office. Some indoor scenes (including all those of the interior of Skeldale House) were shot at the BBC's Pebble Mill studios in Birmingham, a few months after the on-location portions. This is demonstrated in the first series, when Christopher Timothy is seen walking normally during the scenes filmed in Yorkshire during the latter part of 1977, but by the time the studio shots take place, after his accident, his immobility is quite obvious.

"Most of the locations were around Leyburn, where the unit had been based at the Golden Lion Hotel and Eastfield Lodge Hotel, respectively," recalled assistant floor manager David Tilley. "All the timings have to be scheduled in advance. It would be a blank sheet of paper when you started. The only thing that was pre-scheduled was the studio recording dates, which were organised by the BBC's Planning department, in conjunction with all the other series using the studios. We would then have to work out everything for each individual episode. We would always do the location filming first, so we assembled in Yorkshire to record the film inserts for 'Pig in the Middle' in the same block as 'Every Dog His Day...' I would have to make sure everyone arrived on time, either by car or bus, and that we had everything we needed to complete the scenes in time."

For the first three series, up until the two Christmas specials of 1983 and 1985, most interior scenes were recorded on video at Pebble Mill and edited together with exterior shots. This provided hardships in December 1977, when filming briefly returned to the Dales, after a block of studio recording, to capture the look of winter. The temperatures dropped well below freezing. "The snow was high and the ice was solid," explained Robert Hardy in 2003. "I remember two occasions when we were so cold, from the wind on the [moorland] tops, that we couldn't speak. We had to stop." Peter Davison recalled: "People would hand me a cup of tea and I would stick my hand in it, rather than drink it, because my fingers were so cold." For the final four series, much of the filming other than at Skeldale House was done wholly on location at the farms. "Studios aren't really like cow byres or horse stables or country farm houses," explained Hardy, "so one had to make believe a great deal in those early episodes. I mean, they made good sets, but it was better later when we stopped using the studio and did all the filming in real locations in Yorkshire. That was when it really started coming alive, because the cameras were in real situations."

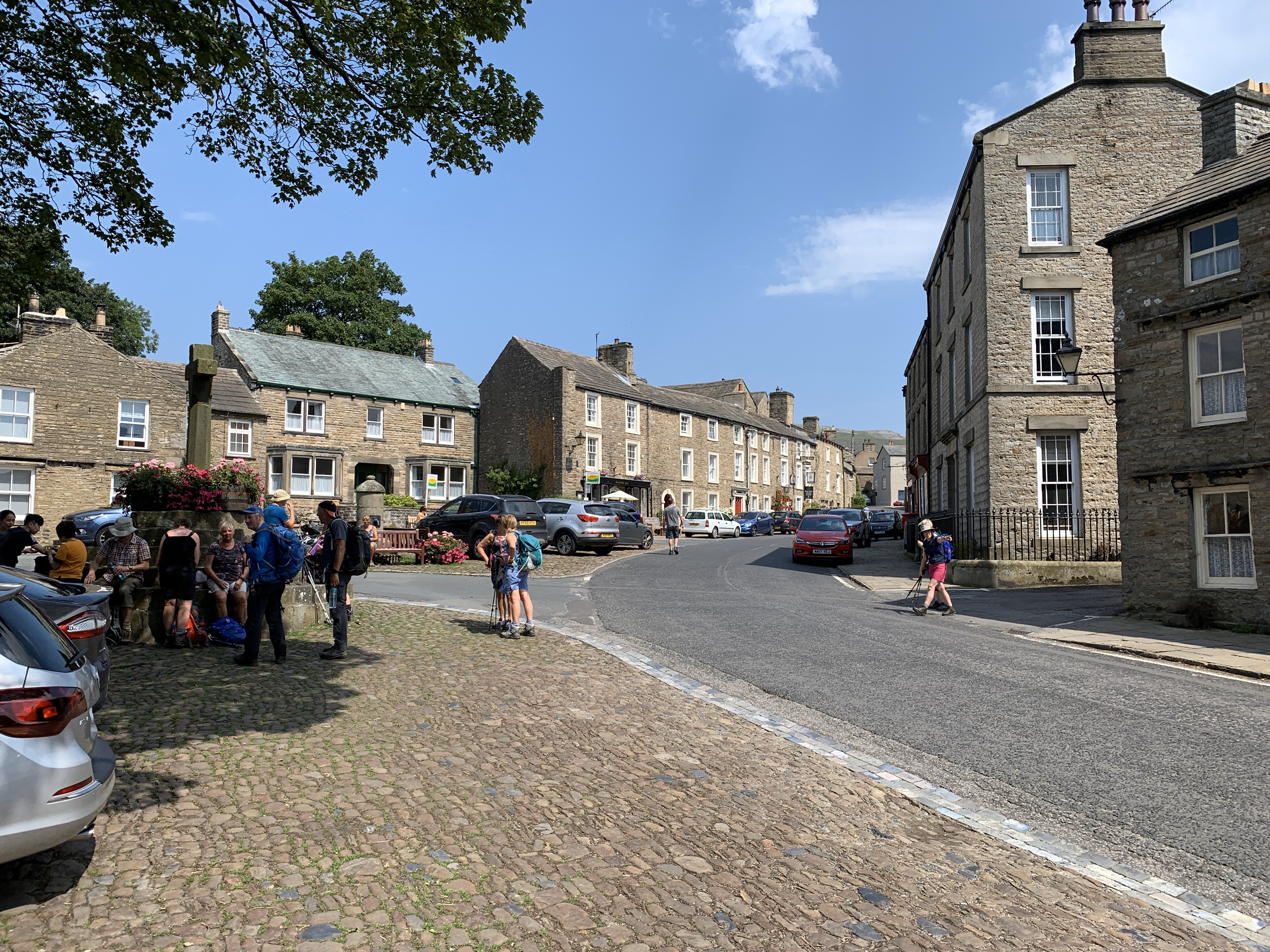
Askrigg market cross and, on the right, a side view of Skeldale House

"In the first series, we had large animals in the studio, with sets for farm barns and cow sheds, which were later filmed on location," explains designer David Crozier. "There were all sorts of things you had to take into consideration, not least of which was how you are going to dispose of the animal's waste, so we were effectively building these stables and cow sheds in the studio for real."

"I was first scheduled to All Creatures in 1989," explained wardrobe member Helen Scarsbrook. "An average day's filming would often start around 6am at the unit base in Leyburn, which was an old empty school where we kept all the costumes and equipment. The actors would arrive and we would dress everybody. Then we would load up the unit cars—which in Yorkshire were a couple of Ford Sierra estates—so we could pile up the costumes for all the changes. Then we would drive out to location, which was quite often Bainbridge, so quite a long journey." (Bainbridge is thirteen miles directly west of Leyburn by car.)

Maggie Thomas was one of the three make-up personnel in the original run. She recalled: "The actual make-up job seemed pretty minimal, until we realised that every storyline had an injured animal in it, and that my designer and I would, as far as possible, be doing them! What we didn't know was that every animal injury in the storyline would require a lot of attention from the make-up department. It soon became very clear that we were going to have our work cut out to achieve some believable-looking animal injuries. Mostly we always knew in advance what would be needed from reading the script; otherwise, we wouldn't be ready when it came to that part of the day's shoot. We always had a gallon of artificial blood with us, but there were occasions when we couldn't foresee an event that would require our 'expertise'."

James Herriot's Yorkshire, written by the vet and published in 1979, mentions several of his favourite locations in "his" Yorkshire, many of which were used in the television series but with different names. These include Bedale, Keld, Gunnerside, West Witton, West Burton, Muker, Semerwater, Countersett, Coverdale, West Scrafton (where the Herriots holidayed), Middleham, Sutton Bank and Oughtershaw, which is "some of Yorkshire's bleakest country".

When I left Glasgow to work as assistant to Siegfried Farnon, I had the conviction, like many Scots, that there was no scenery outside Scotland. I had a mental impression of Yorkshire as a stodgy, uninteresting place – rural in parts, perhaps, but dull. I remember Siegfried saying to me a few days after I had first met him, 'Wait till you see Swaledale, Wensleydale and Coverdale, my boy.' [He] was right. I suddenly found myself in a wonderland. I think the exact moment it dawned on me that Yorkshire was a magical place was when I pulled my car off the unfenced road leading from Leyburn over Bellerby Moor to Grinton. It was near the highest point, by a little stream, and I looked back over the swelling moorland to the great wooded valley of the River Swale where it curves on its approach to the town of Richmond."

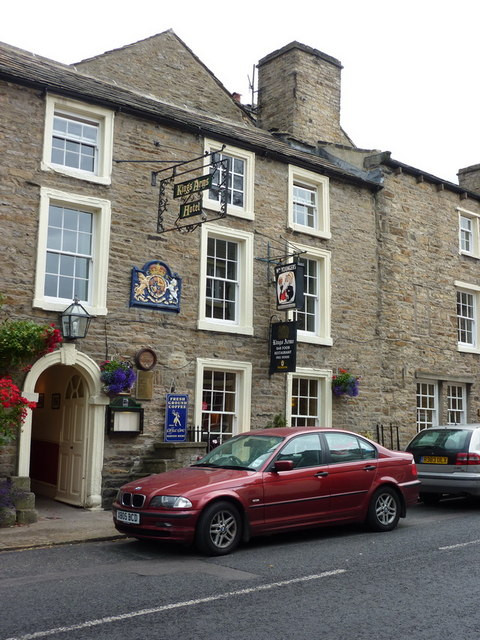
The Kings Arms Hotel, on Main Street, doubled as the Drovers Arms in the series.

When it came to the oft-joked-about insertion of an arm into a cow's rear end, Davison said: "People think we cheated, or something. I tell them that the BBC are not going to pay for a stunt cow that I can put my arm up." Robert Hardy added: "It's enchanting, because once you've got your hand inside you can understand how the interior works." Davison first had to perform this examination in the series-one closer "Breath of Life", which was filmed in November 1977. "I had not [yet] been called upon. Now here in black and white: Interior Barn: Tristan is stripped to the waist with his arm up a cow. I spent so many days worrying about it, I didn't even give much thought to the cold weather. The series was set in 1937, when vets didn't have the luxury of modern 1977 rubber gloves, so therefore neither did the actors portraying them. All we had was a bar of soap, a bucket of warm water, and Jack Watkinson, our veterinary adviser, to show us what to do. 'It's very simple,' he said. 'A quick up and down the arm with the bar of soap, and in you go.' So on a cold November day with the wind whistling through the cracks in the walls of the wooden barn, in I went. Of course, when I got on with it, it wasn't so bad, and even the cow seemed to quite enjoy it. All I remember is thinking the only warm part of my body was my arm. Afterwards, with a real sense of achievement, I made my way back to get cleaned up, and even the sparks seemed to look at me with new respect, although I felt sorry for them, having to clean the cow shit off the cables after filming."

What is now Skeldale Guest House, a bed and breakfast named for obvious reasons, provided the exterior shots of the surgery building. "It was actually called Cringley House," explained Peter Davison, "and owned by Olive Turner and her husband Charles, who welcomed us with open arms from the first day of filming. Although we never shot any interior scenes there, it was often used for make-up and costume and, while relaxing between takes, they would make us tea and coffee and show us pictures of their children. The couple even appeared as extras in a couple of scenes."

The Kings Arms Hotel, which became the Drovers Arms during filming of the later series, features photographs on its interior walls of the cast drinking at the establishment during downtime. The Drovers was made out to be located beside the church in the early series, as evidenced in the episode "The Name of the Game". "It was fun to design the Drovers, which later on they did on location in Askrigg," explained designer David Crozier. "But in the early days these scenes were all done at Pebble Mill."

Just up Main Street, past the pub, Lodge Yard was featured in the episode "Against the Odds".

A house directly across the street from the front exterior of Cringley House was used for location for the back garden of Skeldale in several episodes, including both 1983 and 1985 Christmas specials and in scenes in the series' second run.

For the 1985 Christmas Special, filming was based in Richmond. The gymnasium of the barracks of the Green Howards regiment became Skeldale's surgery. The King's Head Hotel, meanwhile, was the scene of James and Helen's anniversary dinner. It was in Richmond that Peter Davison decided to leave the role of Doctor Who. "I made the decision to leave the series after sitting on my bed in a hotel room in Richmond. John Nathan-Turner had been pushing me to do a fourth year (I was yet to start my third), and my agent had called me for the second time that day. It would have meant better money (within reason—this was the BBC, after all), and a chance to have more say in story development, but it also broke my unwritten 'three series and out' rule, and the similar advice Patrick Troughton had given me. We were in the middle of filming the first All Creatures Great and Small Christmas Special, and the previous night, over a thick gammon steak and eggs, in a pub in Middleham, I'd discussed my future choices with Chris Timothy. I'd already had a similar talk with Robert Hardy, and both agreed it was time for me to move on. That's what I told my agent. So I burned my bridges and tried to imagine life after Doctor Who, never imagining that there wouldn't really be one."

Parts of the beginning title sequence—in particular, the car passing through the ford—were shot on a road called Peat Gate between Feetham in Swaledale and Langthwaite in Arkengarthdale.

"I used to love the old cars," explained Robert Hardy. "Except when they gave up. They were always giving up. We had a permanent mechanic up there and he was always deep inside the bonnet of this or that car. But I had some nice cars to drive, and when they worked they were great fun. And, of course, I was old enough to remember how to double declutch and all that sort of thing, so they weren't a shock to me."

== Theme tune ==
What became the eponymous theme tune for All Creatures Great and Small was written as KPM library music in 1968 by Johnny Pearson. Titled "Piano Parchment", it was chosen by producer Bill Sellars, who had earlier selected Pearson's "Sleepy Shores" as the theme for the TV programme Owen, M.D.. Two versions of the theme were re-recorded for the opening titles of All Creatures: that of the first run was flute-orientated; meanwhile, the version used for the second was more in line with the piano-based original.

Almost all of the incidental music used in the show was written by Pearson and performed by him and his orchestra. The exceptions are the two "gypsy songs" "Ditchling Beacon" and "English Pasture", written by John Leach, which appear in the episode "Out of Practice".

=== 1978 soundtrack ===
The LP, entitled All Creatures Great and Small: The Original Music from the TV Series and Other Favourite Themes and released on Rampage Records in 1978, was produced by Larry Page and Adrian Kerridge. ("Autumn Reverie", also known as "Heather", although featured several times throughout the series, is not on the soundtrack. It was originally featured on Pearson's 1968 Gentle Sounds album.)

All tracks written by Johnny Pearson except where stated.

Side one ("A")

1. "All Creatures Great and Small" (2:10)
2. "First Love" (2:39)
3. "Love Dream" (2:46)
4. "Misty Sunset" (3:28)
5. "Lover's Guitar" (4:36)
6. "Today I Met My Love" (2:49)

Side two ("B")

1. "Sleepy Shores" (3:06)
2. "Over the Hedge Rows" (3:22) (in a shortened version that appears in the episode "Faint Hearts", its ending is slowed down)
3. "Sublime Country" (1:52)
4. "Helena" (2:30)
5. "Sunshine" (3:18)
6. "Love Story" (Francis Lai) (4:56)

New pieces written after the first run of the series appeared in the second run, but these have not been released as a soundtrack. A few of them appear on Pearson's 1988 two-part release, KPM 1000 Series: Johnny Pearson Piano and Orchestra, including the notable trumpet piece "Country Fayre", the flute-driven "Fields and Hedgerows", the piano-based "A Ride in the Sun" and the orchestral "Thames Rhapsody", "Crystal Breeze", "Odd Moments", "Camelia Dance", "Lovers and Friends" and "Village Green". Also, on the first of the two editions, are two alternate versions of "Piano Parchment" (a 60-second edit and a 30-second edit).

== Home media ==
All seven series and three Christmas Specials have been released on DVD in Region 1, Region 2 and Region 4. The 1990 Christmas Special (entitled "Brotherly Love") is regarded as being part of Series 7.

DVD title	No. of discs	Year	No. of episodes	Region 1	Region 2	Region 4
Series 1	4	1978	13	14 May 2002	N/A	2 January 2013
Series 1, Volume 1	3	1978	6	N/A	7 April 2003	1 September 2003
Series 1, Volume 2	3	1978	7	N/A	5 May 2003	1 September 2003
Series 1 & 2	8	1978	27	N/A	N/A	5 October 2010
Series 2	4	1978	14	15 October 2002	N/A	2 January 2013
Series 2, Volume 1	3	1978	7	N/A	7 July 2003	5 May 2005
Series 2, Volume 2	3	1978	7	N/A	15 September 2003	5 May 2005
Series 3	4	1979–1980	14	16 September 2003	23 October 2006	4 May 2006
Series 4	3	1988	10	14 September 2004	26 December 2006	11 April 2007
Series 5	4	1988	12	19 July 2005	3 March 2008	2 April 2008
Series 6	4	1989	12	25 July 2006	18 August 2008	2 April 2009
Series 7	4	1990	13	14 August 2007	26 December 2008	18 May 2010
Christmas Specials	2	1983 and 1985	2	16 September 2003	20 October 2008	2 April 2008
Complete Collection	33	1978–1990	90	15 January 2008	9 November 2009	9 August 2017

== Skeldale House ==
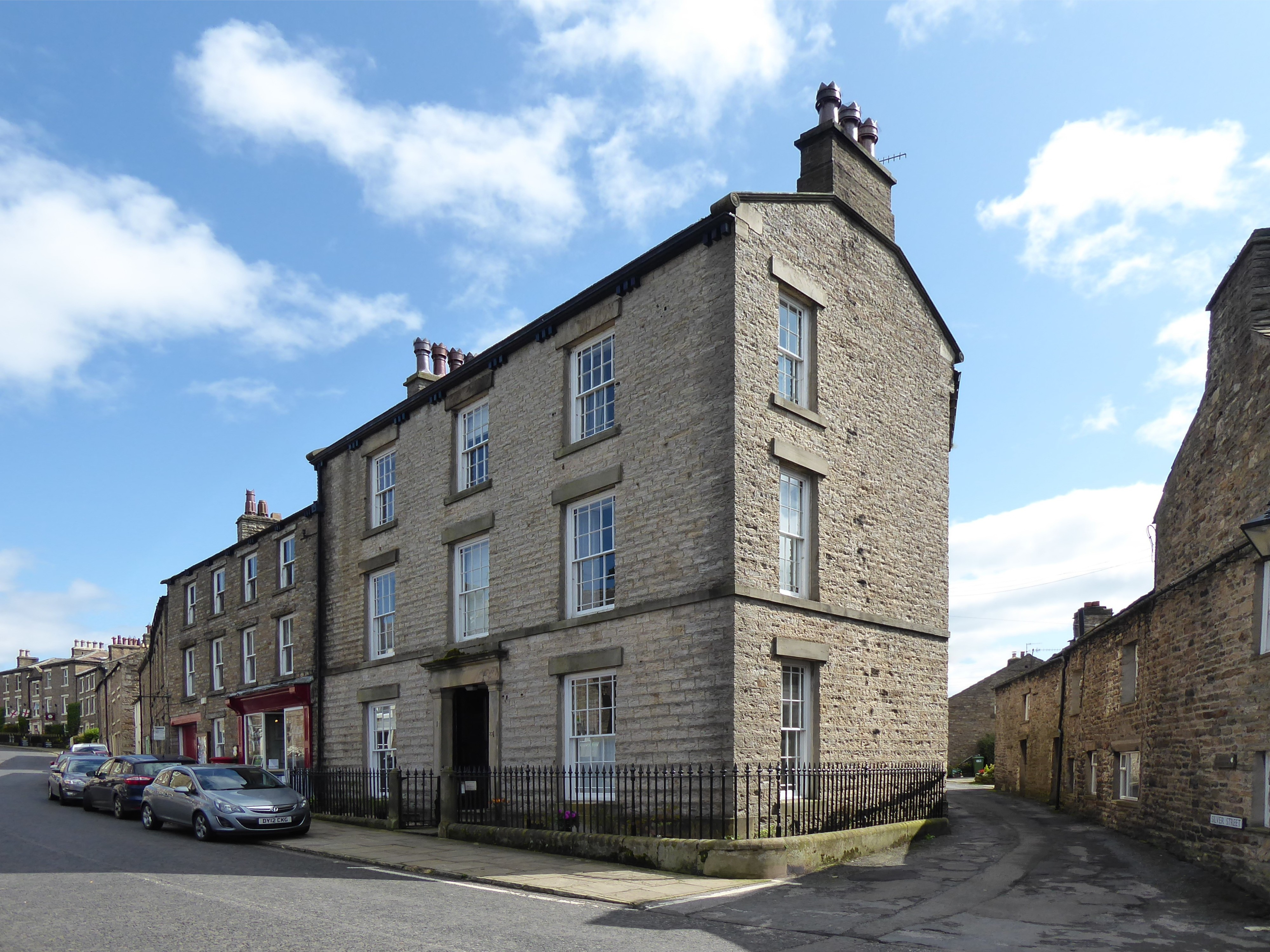
Skeldale House, pictured in 2019. It is now a bed and breakfast, named Skeldale Guest House

Although he has not always stayed there, instead living with Caroline later in the series, Siegfried owns Skeldale House, and while he is happy—within reason—to pay for its upkeep and renovation, he is rarely seen getting his hands dirty outside the surgery. Tristan, on the other hand, takes over the household duties from Mrs Hall in "Hair of the Dog" and "Home and Away", and James has to pick up the slack when Helen is out of action, on account of a slipped disc, in the first few episodes of series 5.

The Pebble Mill set was laid out to match Skeldale House as it appeared in exterior shots. A door on the right side of the building, for example, was used to represent the entrance to the waiting room. On a couple of occasions, the cast had to go inside the Askrigg building to accommodate exterior shots on its windows but, other than a view out of the surgery window in the 1990 Christmas Special, the camera never followed them inside. In the series 3 finalé "Big Steps and Little 'Uns", Helen is shown waving James off to war from an opened second-floor window.

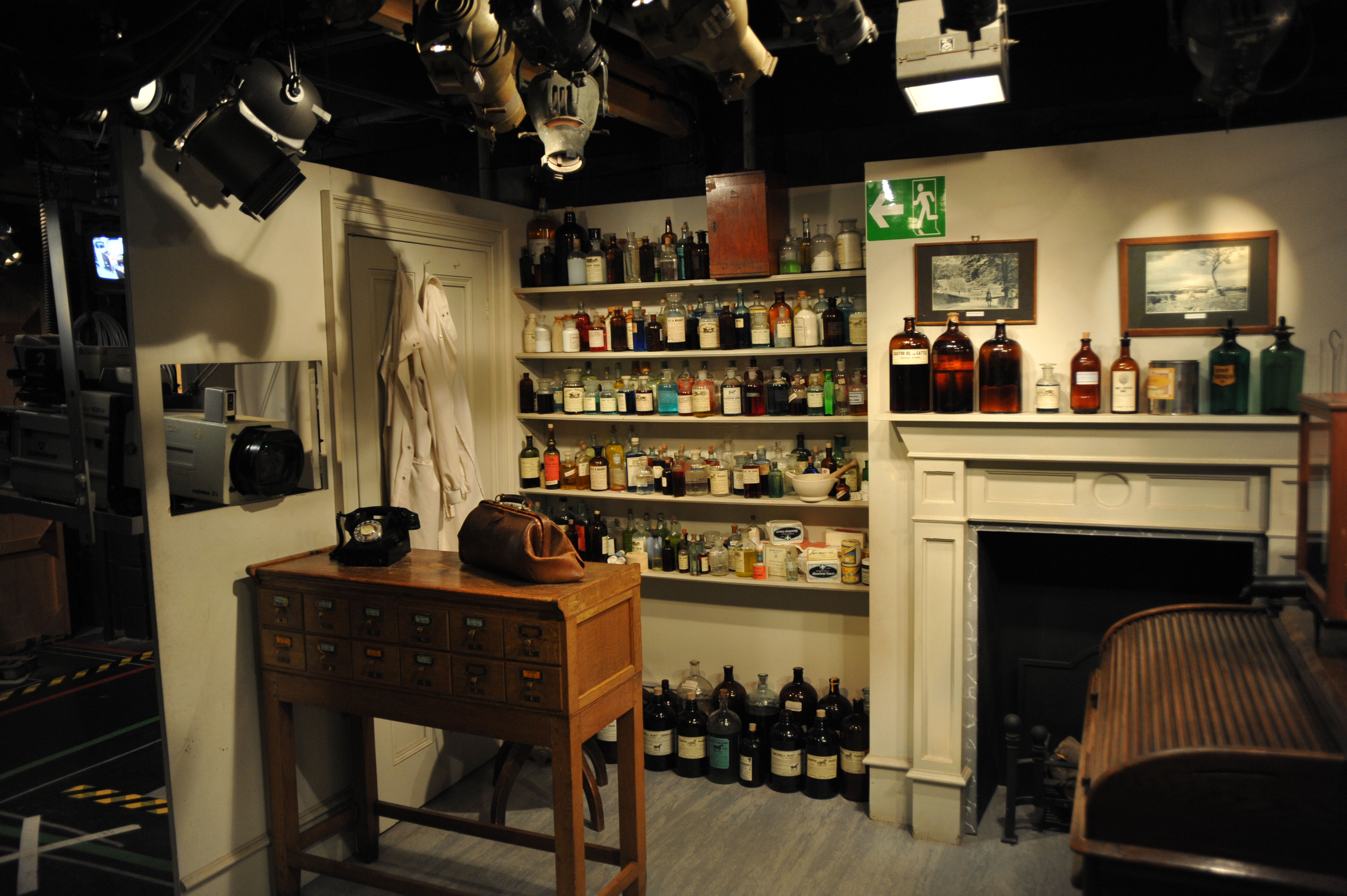
The dispensary section of the Skeldale House surgery on permanent display at the James Herriot Museum in Thirsk

On the ground floor there are four rooms (clockwise from front to back): unused dining room (see below), the sitting room (the front half being the sitting area; the rear half being the dining area), the kitchen, and the surgery. Aside from the back door, another door in the kitchen leads to the surgery's waiting room. The house's only phone is in the hallway, in a nook by the stairs which also contains a grandfather clock and, later in the series, the door to the basement, where coal and wine are kept. A coat rack originally also appeared here, but was later moved to the foyer. The window above the front door announces that you are at "Skeldale House", a feature that remains today. Regarding the clock: "That clock should have been taken out and burnt," joked director Roderick Graham. "When you are doing retakes, how do you sync the tick-tock from the previous take? It was a nightmare and would drown out the dialogue."

"The staircase went nowhere," revealed Peter Davison. "If you had to run downstairs to answer the phone, it meant perching yourself on a small platform just out of shot and launching yourself into the scene."

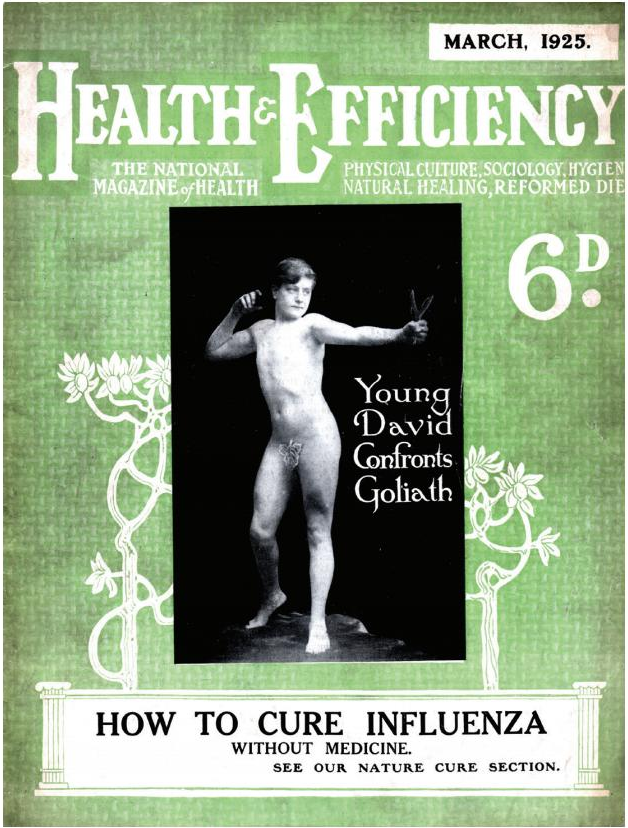
Tristan would occasionally leave copies of Health & Efficiency in the surgery's waiting room, in the hopes of catching one of the clients reading it

"For the studio, we changed the colours of the surgery in the second series to give it a bit of time progression," explained David Crozier, the designer. "I'd used the whitewashed look in the first series, because I'd found hundreds and hundreds of photos from that period in Yorkshire of house interiors painted in whitewash. But as we moved closer to wartime, we went with a darker look, which became the fashion at the time."

"The surgery was full of a wonderful selection of genuine veterinary implements from the thirties as well as shelves of dodgy-looking medicines," recalled Peter Davison. "For my own character of Tristan, I decided it would be fun if all I ever did in the surgery was clutch a mortar and pestle in case Siegfried appeared, aside from the usual smoking and reading 1937 copies of Health and Efficiency."

The first floor contains the bedrooms, while the second floor contains a small suite which Siegfried offers to James and Helen in the first episode of series 2. When the couple move to Rowangarth, Calum takes over the suite.

In "Merry Gentlemen", the final episode of the second series, we see behind the door immediately on the left as one enters the front door of Skeldale. The original, now-unused dining room, Siegfried uses it as overflow for storage of his reserve wine collection. Covered in dust, the room is brought back to life by Helen and Mrs Hall. The fire is lit, and the Christmas tree is put up in one of the corners.

In the early series, the back door opens into a narrow alley; later, the back garden becomes an expansive area of grass, shrubbery and stone walls. An aviary is seen in the episodes "Fair Means and Fowl" and, twelve years later, "A Cat in Hull's Chance".

The original set of the interior of the Skeldale House surgery is now located at the Richmondshire Museum in Richmond and is open to the public. Other extensive parts, including the living room and the dispensary, are on display at The World of James Herriot museum in Thirsk, which is also open to the public.

== Legacy ==
"There was something about the series. It had the right content," recalled producer Bill Sellars. "It became a world favourite, and at its height was actually watched by twenty million viewers."

The series occupied a slot in the TV week that helped solidify it as Sunday-evening fare. Robert Hardy remarked that: "It hit the right moment. There was a feeling still in the towns that the country was a glorious place inhabited by amazing people." TV historian Chris Diamond commented, "It's the perfect post-dinner, pre-bath time slot. You're going to be either hanging about in the living room trying to avoid dishes, or waiting to have a bath."

Hardy was also concerned that the series would be a brief affair. His worry was that it would "bore the townspeople and irritate the countryfolk". He put its success down to the fact that it featured "real people". Christopher Timothy, on the other hand, thought it had an excellent chance due to the popularity of Wight's books.

The cast became household names around the world. "I've had letters from vets, both male and female, who say they became vets because of the series," said Robert Hardy.

Christopher Timothy became the most famous vet on the planet, which became a mixed blessing. "After I did All Creatures, it was eight years before I acted on television again," he recalled. "I remember once going to see my agent and, going up the stairs to his office, hearing him screaming down the phone: 'He's not a vet, he's a bloody actor!'" "I asked Pete [Davison] once, 'How is it that you go from one role to the other and I can't get arrested on television?' He said, 'Because I didn't play James Herriot...' I think there's an element of truth in that."

"It was a big slice of my career, for which I am very, very grateful," added Robert Hardy. "The series means a great deal to me as it took up such a large span of my life."

== Reunions and interviews ==
When Peter Davison was made the subject of This Is Your Life in 1982, Christopher Timothy, Robert Hardy and Carol Drinkwater all appeared as guests. Timothy, Davison and Jean Heywood attended Lynda Bellingham's appearance on the show in 1993. Timothy's time came in 2000, for which Hardy, Davison, Drinkwater and Bellingham were in attendance.

Christopher Timothy and Robert Hardy attended a service of thanksgiving for Alf Wight at York Minster on 20 October 1995, eight months after the author's death.

In 2003, Timothy, Hardy, Carol Drinkwater and Lynda Bellingham appeared together on Stars Reunited. Due to having other commitments, Peter Davison could not be present. Also briefly joining them, and host Dale Winton, on the couch was Jack Watkinson, MRCVS, the Yorkshire vet with whom Timothy lived and worked for a week prior to the filming of the series. Timothy has stated that, for him, it was the best week of the whole series. "I did seriously feel, with all humility, that when I turned up to start filming: 'I'm sort of equipped for this.'" Carol Drinkwater later said of this appearance: "[Dale] did an interview with each of us on our own, and he asked if I had known what a sex symbol I was? I was completely stunned, I had no idea. I mean, I used to get boxes of marriage proposals... I used to bin them, I never read them. I was very naughty. Now I answer all my mail, though there is much less of it now, of course."

"None of us ever did anything that could harm an animal," explained Timothy in another interview. "The injections were all faked and arms up a cow's bum is not difficult to do—and the cows don't mind too much... in fact, some cows quite like it! Jack Watkinson wouldn't tolerate anything that he deemed as unethical. The directors at one point sent out a note about how animals should be treated in the furtherance of entertainment, but it was always left to the attending vet's discretion. If it had gone against any of his ethical code, Jack would have refused us to do it."

Watkinson died in May 2013 after suffering a stroke. He was 84. Watkinson was the on-location technical advisor; his studio-based counterpart was Eddie Straiton. "He was an incredible character, an absolutely astonishing man," remembered Robert Hardy. Along with Donald and Brian Sinclair, Alf Wight dedicated his 1972 book All Creatures Great and Small to Straiton.

As the 1983 Christmas Special had done, the interview included a tribute to Mary Hignett (Mrs Hall), who died shortly after the series' first run: "She was the warmest-hearted, most genial, most enchanting companion," said Hardy. "She was a total dear; I absolutely adored her, and it was tragic that she died far too soon and left us bereft." Timothy added: "A fabulous lady, and greatly, greatly missed."

Timothy, Hardy and Drinkwater reunited again in 2006 at The World of James Herriot museum in Thirsk. In October 2016, all four main actors from the original run reunited to mark the centenary of Alf Wight's birth.
