= Ted Rhodes (script editor) =

British television script editor

- Born: 9 May 1934; Blackpool, England
- Died: 16 December 2003 (aged 69); Wimbledon, England
- Occupation: Script editor
- Employer: BBC

Edward Rhodes (9 May 1934 – 16 December 2003) was a British television script editor who worked on 42 of 90 episodes of the BBC series All Creatures Great and Small.

Rhodes died of internal bleeding from a ruptured spleen in Wimbledon, London. He also had broken ribs and a broken jaw. A coroner found no link between his death and a punch he had taken from a cyclist he insulted while drunk two days prior. He was 69.

"I couldn't have done any of it without Ted Rhodes. He was marvellous", said Bill Sellars, producer of All Creatures. "He was a brilliant script editor. He spent his lifetime as a script editor and he had so many ideas. He knew how to put a script together. He knew what the beginning was, he knew the middle and he knew the end, and he could really weave those together to create one whole. They were never disjointed."
