= Olaf Pooley =

English actor and painter (1914–2015)

- Pooley in Doctor Who, 1970
- Born: Ole Krohn Pooley; 13 March 1914; Parkstone, Dorset, England
- Died: 14 July 2015 (aged 101); Santa Monica, California, U.S.
- Occupations: Actor, screenwriter, painter
- Years active: 1943–2005
- Spouses: Irlin Hall (m. 1946, divorced) (2 children); Gabrielle Beaumont (m. 1982; div. 1993); (1 child)
- Children: 3

Oloe Krohn "Olaf" Pooley (13 March 1914 – 14 July 2015) was an English actor, screenwriter and painter.

== Early life ==
Pooley was born to an English father and Danish mother in Parkstone, Dorset. He attended Dane Court preparatory school in Pyrford where his father was headmaster. He studied painting at Chelsea College of Arts and at the Académie Colarossi in Paris under the tutelage of Marcel Gromaire, before training at the Architectural Association School of Architecture to enable a more financially secure career option. His paternal uncle Sir Ernest Pooley, the future Chairman of the Arts Council of Great Britain, secured him a job as a set designer at Pinewood Studios. During World War II, Pooley registered as a conscientious objector and volunteered as a fireman; he was subsequently discharged on medical grounds and began his acting career on stage.

== Career ==
He wrote and appeared in the film The Corpse (released in the United States as Crucible of Horror), starring Michael Gough, and wrote, directed and appeared in The Johnstown Monster. He also wrote the screenplay for a film version of Bernard Taylor's novel The Godsend (1980). Beaumont directed the film. Pooley's other writing credits include the television film Falcon's Gold (1982) and being an uncredited writer on the sci-fi horror film Lifeforce (1985).

Pooley's TV guest appearances from the 1950s onwards include Dixon of Dock Green, Paul Temple, Jason King, MacGyver and Star Trek: Voyager. He played Professor Stahlman and his parallel Earth counterpart Director Stahlmann in the Doctor Who serial Inferno (1970). He also played Lars Torvik in the first episode of The Sandbaggers ("First Principles", 1978). His other appearances include the BBC Radio play Ambrose in Paris (1958) and Sebastian in a BBC Television Sunday Night Theatre production of William Shakespeare's The Tempest (1956). Pooley had a major career in West End theatre appearing in such notable productions as Noël Coward's Peace in Our Time and revivals of The Tempest and Othello. He was also a member of the BBC Radio repertory company.

== Personal life ==
In 1946, Pooley married actress Irlin Hall and together they had a daughter, the actress Kirstie Pooley (born 1954) and a son, comedian Seyton Pooley and later divorced. From 1982 to 1993, he was married to director Gabrielle Beaumont. The two had a daughter, Amanda Pooley, who died in 1989.

Pooley moved to the United States in 1986 and lived in Southern California, with an art studio in Santa Monica where he devoted his time to painting. He turned 100 on 13 March 2014.

=== Death ===
He died from congestive heart failure on 14 July 2015, aged 101, at his home in Santa Monica, California. Pooley was survived by his two children, Seyton and Kirstie, and four grandchildren.

== Filmography ==
n.b. for credit listings reference

=== Film ===
Year	Title	Role	Notes	ref
1948	Penny and the Pownall Case	Von Leicher		
1949	The Huggetts Abroad	Straker	The final film of The Huggetts	
1949	The Lost People	Milosh	Set after the Second World War	
1950	She Shall Have Murder	Mr. White	British drama film	
1950	Highly Dangerous	Detective-Interrogator	British spy film	
1951	Hell Is Sold Out	Cheri	British drama film	
1952	The Woman's Angle	Fudolf Mansell	British drama film	
1952	Gift Horse	German Interrogation Officer	Uncredited	
1952	Top Secret	Professor Roblettski	British comedy film	
1956	The Gamma People	Bikstein		
1956	The Iron Petticoat	Major Osip Feodor Ganovich		
1956	Anastasia	Zhadanov	Uncredited	
1957	Windom's Way	Colonel Lupat	Uncredited; British thriller film	
1959	Left Right and Centre	TV newscaster		
1960	Sink the Bismarck!	Officer of the Watch on Sheffield	Uncredited	
1962	The Password Is Courage	German doctor	Based on John Castle's 1954 Second World War memoir of the same name	
1962	The Battleaxe	Cranborn		
1966	Naked Evil	Father Goodman	British horror film	
1969	The Assassination Bureau Limited	Swiss Cashier	Released in North America as The Assassination Bureau; A black comedy film	
1971	The Corpse	Reid	Originally known as The Velvet House in the United Kingdom; Released as Crucible of Horror in the United States	
1979	Charlie Muffin	Soviet First Secretary		

=== Television ===
Year	Title	Role	Notes	ref
1952	Dial M for Murder	Captain Lesgate	Original production BBC Television, 23 March 1952 20.30	
1958	The Adventures of Ben Gunn	Billy Bones	4 episodes	
1958	Colonel March of Scotland Yard	Carlmeddy	Episode: "The Abominable Snowman" (S 1:Ep 3)	
1958	The Invisible Man	Casino Manager	Episode: "Odds Against Death" (S 1:Ep 12)	
1960	The Four Just Men	Lorenzo	Episode: "The Rietti Group" (S 1:Ep 21)	
1963	Ghost Squad	Kobelik	Episode: "The Menacing Mazurka" (S 2:Ep 10)	
1963	Hancock	Ron Roberts	Episode: "The Reporter" (S 1:Ep 11)	
1965	Sherlock Holmes	Lascar	Episode: "The Man with the Twisted Lip" (S 1:Ep 7)	
1966	The Master	The Master	Southern Television six-part adaptation of T. H. White novel	
1967	The Troubleshooters	Aircraft Captain	Episode: "Think Big (S 2:Ep 6)	
1968	Detective	Mr. Nash	Episode: "Crime of Passion" (S 2:Ep 14)	
1968	The Expert	Adams	Episode: "He's Good for It" (S 1:Ep 10)	
1968	Dixon of Dock Green	Captain Bailey	Episode: "Berserk" (S 15:Ep 16)	
1969	Paul Temple	John Blight	Episode: "Who Dies Next" (S 1:Ep 1)	
1970	Codename	Istov	Episode: "The Quickness of the Hand" (S 1:Ep 8)	
1970	Doctor Who	Professor Stahlman	Serial: Inferno (7 episodes)	
1971	Doomwatch	Ensor	Episode: "By the Pricking of My Thumbs..." (S 2:Ep 5)	
1971	Jason King	Gorini	Episode: "A Page Before Dying" (S 1:Ep 2)	
1973	Pathfinders	Leidig	Episode: "Operation Pickpocket" (S 1: Ep 11)	
1973	The Protectors	Commissioner Braun	Episode: "WAM, Part Two" (S 2:Ep 9)	
1974	Special Branch	Eastry Senior	Episode: "Jailbait" (S 1:Ep 1)	
1974	The Zoo Gang	Inspector	Episode: "The Twisted Cross" (S 1:Ep 6)	
1975	The Basil Brush Show	Hans	Episode: "Christmas in Norway" (S 10:Ep 10)	
1978	Rainbow	Reader	Episode: "Crawling" (S 11:Ep 11)	
1978	The Sandbaggers	Lars Torvik	Episode: "First Principles" (S 1:Ep 1)	
1983	Mr. Smith	Dr. Freeman	Episode: "Mr. Smith Operates" (S 1:Ep 4)	
1984	Scarecrow and Mrs. King	Claude	Episode: "The Artful Dodger" (S 1:Ep17)	
1985	MacGyver	Dr. Sidney Marlow	Episode: "Pilot" (S 1:Ep 1)	
1986	Hill Street Blues	Jaeger	Episode: "Suitcase" (S 7:Ep 1)	
1992	L.A. Law	Dr. Stanley Schulan	Episode: "Great Balls Afire" (S 6:Ep 15)	
1996	Dr. Quinn, Medicine Woman	Judge	Episode: "Eye for an Eye" (S 4:Ep 20)	
2000	Star Trek: Voyager	Cleric	Episode: "Blink of an Eye" (S 6:Ep 12)	

== See also ==
- List of centenarians (actors, filmmakers and entertainers)
