= Three Sisters (1970 film) =

1970 British film

- DVD cover
- Directed by: Laurence Olivier; John Sichel
- Screenplay by: Moura Budberg (trans.)
- Based on: Three Sisters (play) by Anton Chekhov
- Produced by: James C. Katz & John Goldstone
- Starring: Joan Plowright; Jeanne Watts; Louise Purnell; Derek Jacobi; Alan Bates; Laurence Olivier
- Cinematography: Geoffrey Unsworth
- Edited by: Jack Harris
- Music by: William Walton
- Distributed by: British Lion Films
- Release dates: 2 November 1970 (UK); 4 February 1974 (US)
- Running time: 165 minutes
- Country: United Kingdom
- Language: English

Three Sisters is a 1970 British drama film directed by Laurence Olivier and John Sichel, and starring Olivier, Alan Bates and Joan Plowright. The screenplay was by Moura Budberg based on the 1901 play by Anton Chekhov.

== Plot ==
In a small Russian town at the turn of the century, three sisters – Olga, Irina and Masha – and their brother Andrei live, but dream daily of their return to their former home in Moscow, where life is charming, stimulating and meaningful. But for now, they exist in a malaise of dissatisfaction. Soldiers from the local military post provide them some companionship and society, but nothing can suffice to replace Moscow in their hopes. Andrei marries a provincial girl, Natasha, and begins to settle into a life of much less meaning than he had hoped. Natasha begins to run the family her way. Masha, though married, yearns for the sophisticated life and begins a dalliance with Vershinin, an Army Colonel with a sick and suicidal wife. Even Irina, the freshest, most optimistic of the sisters, begins to waver in her dreams until, finally, tragedy strikes.

== Cast ==
- Jeanne Watts as Olga Prozorova
- Joan Plowright as Masha Kulighina
- Louise Purnell as Irina Prozorova
- Derek Jacobi as Andrei Prozorova
- Sheila Reid as Natasha Ivanova
- Kenneth MacKintosh as Fyodor Kulighin
- Daphne Heard as Anfisa
- Judy Wilson as serving maid
- Mary Griffiths as housemaid
- Ronald Pickup as Baron Nikolaj Tusenbach
- Laurence Olivier as Dr. Ivan Chebutikin
- Frank Wylie as Maj. Vassili Vassilich Solyony
- Alan Bates as Col. Aleksandr Vershinin
- Richard Kay as Lt. Aleksej Fedotik

== Production ==
Sidney Gilliat, who was on the board of British Lion at the time the film was made, said an American investor was meant to put in £100,000–£200,000 but pulled out and British Lion had to make up the shortfall.

it was the final feature film directed by Olivier and was based on a 1967 production that Olivier had directed at the Royal National Theatre. Both the theatrical production and the film used the translation from the original Russian by Moura Budberg.

== U.S release ==
The film was released in the U.S. in 1974 as part of the American Film Theatre, a series of thirteen film adaptations of stage plays shown to subscribers at about 500 movie theaters across the country.

== Reception ==
=== Box office ===
According to Sidney Giliat, the film lost money.

=== Critical ===
The Monthly Film Bulletin wrote: "The film is very much a straight adaptation of the play, the house rounded out into several rooms, the camera generally keeping a respectful distance and not trying anything too tricky. This lack of imaginative camerawork highlights the staginess of the performances by robbing much of the action of any real atmosphere. ... The most powerful performance comes from Joan Plowright as Masha, perhaps because her character, full of petulance and temper, can more naturally stand apart from the rest of the household and dictate its own terms without seeming mannered or posed. When Irina learns of Tusenbach's death and the sisters realise they are still to remain together at home, Masha runs to comfort her sister with a slight smile on her lips. It is a very good moment, one of the few in the film when a character seems lit up from within. Otherwise, while the film coheres, it does so without any real inspiration."

Charles Champlin wrote in the Los Angeles Times: "There is, of course, no reason why a photographed stage play should pretend to be anything else. The play and the acting are what matter, and let us see and hear them with a minimum of distraction. Except that the conventions of the one medium are not those of the other, and a disbelief willingly suspended in the presence of living actors cannot quite so easily be suspended before flickering projections, On the whole this Three Sisters becomes an item of record, invaluable ...but ultimately after the fact and quite lifeless. Olivier's film does not even accommodate to the differing presumptions of the camera to the extent of putting ceilings on the sets. The flats stretch up to the flies and in a paradoxical way the confining sense of proscenium is lost. The claustrophobic force which Chekhov ought to have on staging is dissipated into the upper darkness, so that the production disappoints doubly, both as filmed theater and as cinema."

Variety wrote: "Pic, which boasts the very satisfying translation by Moura Budberg, is ... not quite a direct record of the play, nor is it quite a complete reinterpretation or reconception of the legit staging. In between the two extremes, it moves around strikingly attracive sets by Josef Svoboda, lovngly photographed by Geoffrey Unsworth, with only a few filmic diversions, i.e., a flash forward to the duel between Tuseénbach and Solloni, another to visualize the sisters' longing for a distant Moscow".

Boxoffice wrote: "Regular subscribers of the [American Film Theatre's] first season should find this absorbing fare and applaud the decision to release the only production not made especially for the series. Sheila Reid as the brother's wife has the most radical character change, from backward peasant girl to shrewish mistress of the manor; those who wait for her comeuppance at the hands of outspoken sister Plowright will be disappointed."

Critic Judith Crist wrote, "Once again we are faced with a neither-film-nor-play production, but it is, in Moura Budberg's liberal but satisfying translation and under Olivier's semi-cinematic direction, one at very least to fascinate devotees of the play. ... Through several performances, in Geoffrey Unsworth's luscious cinematography (and I mean the adjective in praise of the uncluttered and naturally generated flow his work deserves), and in the pacing there is somehow a sensuality and a sexuality underlying the work that I had not hitherto felt."

Molly Haskell wrote that the film "boasts in Joan Plowright's Masha the finest performance I have seen or ever hope to see of one of Chekhov's greatest women characters."

== Home media ==
The film was released as a region 1 DVD in 2004. A Blu-ray version was released in the US in 2017.

== See also ==
- Three Sisters (1994 film), a 1994 Russian language film
