= The Battleaxe =

1962 British film by Godfrey Grayson

- Directed by: Godfrey Grayson
- Screenplay by: M.M. McCormack
- Produced by: The Danzigers
- Starring: Jill Ireland; Francis Matthews; Olaf Pooley; Joan Haythorne
- Cinematography: Lionel Banes
- Edited by: John Dunsford
- Production company: Danziger Productions
- Release date: 1962
- Running time: 65 minutes
- Country: United Kingdom
- Language: English

The Battleaxe is a 1962 British second feature ('B') comedy film directed by Godfrey Grayson and starring Jill Ireland, Francis Matthews and Olaf Pooley. It was written by M.M. McCormack and produced by The Danzigers.

== Plot ==
Man-about-town Tony Evers is engaged to society girl Audrey Page. Audrey breaks their engagement because her domineering mother believes Tony is only after the family money. When Tony sues Audrey for breach of promise, Mrs Page hires a private investigator to look into Tony's affairs. When Tony can account for all the strange things she learns about his past, and he also discloses that, on marriage, he is due a large inheritance from his grandfather, Audrey renews the engagement.

== Cast ==
- Jill Ireland as Audrey Page
- Francis Matthews as Tony Evers
- Olaf Pooley as Cranborn
- Joan Haythorne as Mrs Page
- Richard Caldicot as judge
- Neil Hallett as Charles Whiley
- Michael Beint as Dodson
- Derek Tansley as Ernest Gabbell

== Reception ==
The Monthly Film Bulletin wrote: "Unsubtle romantic comedy in need of more incisive court-room characterisation and less hasty direction. The playing is over-anxious."

Kine Weekly wrote: "The picture, fashioned with TV-like hastiness, has some rough edges, but the overall effect is not unfunny. Jill Ireland makes a refined and ravishing Audrey, and Francis Matthews pulls a few rabbits out of the hat as Tony, but Joan Haythorne overdoes it a bit as the suspicious and arrogant Mrs. Page. The rest get by. The dovetailing of the many flashbacks is firm, and the denouement has a showmanlike twist."
