= Diana: A Tribute to the People's Princess =

- Directed by: Gabrielle Beaumont
- Country of origin: United Kingdom
- Original language: English

Production
- Running time: 100 minutes

Original release
- Release: August 20, 1999

Diana: A Tribute to the People's Princess is a 1998 television film about Diana, Princess of Wales.

== Cast ==
- Amy Seccombe as Diana, Princess of Wales
- George Jackos as Dodi Al Fayed
- Anthony Valentine as William Reede
- Lisa Eichhorn as Rachel
- Rory Jennings as Prince Harry
- Freddie Sayers as Prince William
