= Joan Haythorne =

British actress (1915–1987)

- Publicity still, 1956
- Born: Joan Haythornthwaite; 12 April 1915; London, England
- Died: 27 August 1987 aged 72; Richmond, London, England
- Education: RADA
- Occupation: Actress
- Children: Jeremy Paul (Roche)

Joan Haythorne (12 April 1915 – 27 August 1987) was a British actress.

== Early life, family and education ==
She was born Joan Haythornthwaite, in London.

== Career ==
Her career was mostly from the mid-1940s to early 1960s.

== Personal life ==
Her son Jeremy Paul was a screenwriter.

She died 27 August 1987, Richmond on Thames, Surrey.

== Selected filmography ==
- School for Secrets (1946)
- Highly Dangerous (1950)
- Svengali (1954)
- The Weak and the Wicked (1954)
- The Feminine Touch (1956)
- Dry Rot (1956)
- Three Men in a Boat (1956)
- The Shakedown (1959)
- So Evil, So Young (1961)
- Very Important Person (1961)
- The Battleaxe (1962)

== Selected television ==
Year	Title	Role	Notes
1959	Television Playwright	Tilda	Episode: "Walk on the Grass"
1961-1962	Richard the Lionheart	Queen Eleanor	2 episodes
1968	Frontier	Mrs. Drew	Episode: "The Last of the Line"
1969	Dombey and Son	Mrs. Pipchin	5 episodes
1970	Paul Temple	Mrs. Travers	Episode: "The Black Room"
1971	Justice	Laura Hale	Episode: "To Help an Old School Friend"
1971	...And Mother Makes Three	Miss Campbell	Episode: "But How Can I Tell Them?"
1972	Spyder's Web	Mrs. Gibbes	Episode: "Nobody's Strawberry Fool"
1974	Thriller	Mother Superior	Episode: "Death to Sister Mary"
1975	Days of Hope	Mrs. Snowden	Episode: "1926: General Strike"
1976	Hadleigh	Mrs. Bragge	Episode: "Time Out"
1977	Raffles	Wealthy Lady	Episode: "The Chest of Silver"
1977	The Cedar Tree	Miss Gribble	2 episodes
1977	The Duchess of Duke Street	Mrs. Covenden	Episode: "A Lesson in Manners"
