= Bill Sellars =

British television producer and director (1925–2018)

- Born: 5 June 1925; Tideswell, Derbyshire, England
- Died: 19 December 2018 (aged 93); West Molesey, Surrey, England
- Occupations: Television producer and director
- Years active: 1947–1990
- Employer: BBC
- Spouse(s): June Bland (m. 1950; div. 1974) June Bland (m. 2012)
- Children: 3

William Sellars (5 June 1925 – 19 December 2018) was an English television producer and director, most active from the 1960s to the 1980s. His entire 33-year career was spent working on projects for the BBC. Of these, All Creatures Great and Small (1978–90), which he produced for its entire run, was the biggest success. Conversely, he had a major critical failure with Triangle (1981–83), a soap opera set on board a ferry in the North Sea.

== Early life ==
Sellars was born in Tideswell in Derbyshire and left school at the age of 14 to work in a factory. He performed his Second World War service in the 11th East African Royal Artillery Regiment of the British Army and toured India with the Combined Services Entertainment company.

== Career ==
Sellars began his career in the theatre in 1947, working as an assistant floor manager. This was followed by a long period spent in repertory theatre, where he also began directing. In 1958 he joined the BBC as a floor manager and soon became a production assistant. He became a director at the BBC following an exodus of staff to the corporation's rival, ITV. From 1962-1967, Sellars' work for BBC television drama as a director included being assigned to the soap opera Compact and the early Doctor Who, for which he directed The Celestial Toymaker (1966). He also directed episodes of United! and 199 Park Lane during this period. Most of Sellars's early work was wiped in common with much television of the time.

After his period as a contract director, Sellars became a producer. His first work in this role was as Verity Lambert's successor on The Newcomers. From 1967 to 1976, he moved through a succession of dramas, including The Doctors and The Brothers. He also had a period of producing shorter-form dramas. Most of these were mysteries, such as The Chinese Puzzle (1974) and an adaptation of The Five Red Herrings (1975).

In 1977, he found himself back to regular series work when he was given All Creatures Great and Small, which began transmission in January the following year. Although he would produce other shows in the downtime from All Creatures—such as the poorly received soap opera Triangle and another veterinary drama, One By One—he would work on All Creatures until the end of his active career in 1990. As producer of All Creatures Great and Small he received his only two significant awards nominations: a BAFTA nomination for Best Drama Series in 1979, and a Primetime Emmy nomination for Best Children's Series in 1990.

== Personal life ==
In 1950 Sellars married the actress June Bland. The couple had three children before divorcing in 1974. Sellars then lived with Alan Sandilands, moving to Spain in 2003 and entering a civil partnership the following year. Sandilands died in 2012, and Sellars then returned to England. He remarried Bland, who remained with him until his death.

Sellars' grandson is the comedian Jordan Brookes.
