= Mary Hignett =

British actress

- Hignett with Robert Hardy in an episode of All Creatures Great and Small
- Born: 31 March 1916; Madras, British India
- Died: 6 July 1980 (aged 64); Chichester, England
- Occupation: Actress
- Spouse: Michael Brennan
- Children: 1

Mary Hignett (31 March 1916 – 6 July 1980) was a British actress. In the television series All Creatures Great and Small, she played the role of the cook and housekeeper Edna Hall in the first three series, which ran from 1978 to 1980. Other credits include the Hammer film Prehistoric Women (1967), the horror movie The Corpse (1971), and the 1972 Hammer Horror film Demons of the Mind (in which fellow All Creatures actor Robert Hardy played the role of Zorn).

== Personal life ==
Hignett was born in Madras, British India, to Horace Arthur Du Cane Hignett (c. 1874–1923) and Ellen Kate Allen, who died in childbirth.

Hignett was married to the actor Michael Brennan (1912–1982). They had a daughter.

Hignett died in 1980, aged 64, shortly after the third series of All Creatures was filmed. Scheduled to have a hip replacement, she was convinced by her doctors to have a riskier double hip replacement rather than the single. This is believed to have led to her death. She is buried in Chichester Crematorium and Garden of Remembrance, Chichester, England. Her All Creatures co-stars Robert Hardy, Christopher Timothy and Carol Drinkwater attended the funeral. Her death was written into the script of the 1983 Christmas Special, and her memory was honoured by the four remaining central characters. Her husband was buried alongside her after his death two years later at the age of 69.

== Partial filmography ==
- Prehistoric Women (1967) as Mrs. Hammond
- The Corpse (1971) as Servant
- Demons of the Mind (1972) as Matronly Woman
