= Gabrielle Beaumont =

British film and television director (1942–2022)

- Born: 7 April 1942; Gerrards Cross, UK
- Died: 8 October 2022 (aged 80); Fornalutx, Spain
- Occupation: Director
- Spouses: Olaf Pooley (m. 1982; div. 1993); Michael J Davis (m. 1994; died 2008)
- Children: 1

Gabrielle Beaumont (born Gabrielle Toyne; 7 April 1942 – 8 October 2022) was a British-American film and television director. She is regarded as one of the most prolific female television directors of the 80s and 90s, breaking into the industry at a time when there were "fewer than 100 professional female directors in the US." She was the first woman to work on numerous series, including being the first female director of a Star Trek episode.

== Early life ==
Beaumont was born Gabrielle Toyne on 7 April 1942 in Gerrards Cross, Buckinghamshire to producer and stuntman Gabriel Toyne and actress Diana Beaumont. Her brother was actor and producer Christopher Toyne. She attended Our Lady of Sion School in London. Following her graduation, she took her mother's maiden name, Beaumont, as her surname.

== Career ==
Beaumont began her career as an actress, before moving to theatre production and stage management. In 1964, she was hired as an editor for the BBC. She transitioned in the company to directing and production management, before leaving the company to pursue film production. In 1971, she made her directorial debut with the horror films The Johnstown Monster and Crucible of Horror. From 1973 to 1980, she worked for Thames Television where she directed daytime television programs.

In 1980, Beaumont produced and directed the horror film The Godsend. After its American release, Beaumont was able to secure a meeting with American television producer Aaron Spelling. Following the meeting, she moved to America and began a decades-long working relationship with Spelling, who hired her to direct shows such as Vega$, Hart to Hart, Glitter, and Beverly Hills, 90210. While working with Spelling on Dynasty, she recommended that he cast her friend Joan Collins as Alexis Colby.

When Beaumont first moved to California, she was one of less than 100 professional female directors working in the film and television industry. Despite this, Beaumont stated that the US provided more opportunities for women than the UK, choosing to stay in America for the remainder of her directorial career. In 1986, she was nominated for a Primetime Emmy for her direction on the set of Hill Street Blues. In 1989, she became the first woman to direct an episode of Star Trek, working on the Star Trek: The Next Generation episode "Booby Trap".

She received criticism from media outlets in 1998, after she directed the TV movie Diana: A Tribute to the People's Princess. The film focused on Princess Diana's relationship with Dodi Fayed prior to their death and was described by reviewers as "tacky." Beaumont retired from directing in 2000.

== Later life ==
Following her retirement, Beaumont moved to Mallorca, where she had owned a vacation home since 1969. She took up screenwriting and adapted The King's General into a miniseries script. She later opened up a restaurant in the village of Fornalutx.

Beaumont died of cancer at her home in Fornalutx on 8 October 2022, at the age of 80.

== Personal life ==
Beaumont was married to actor and screenwriter Olaf Pooley from 1982 until their divorce in 1993. The couple had a daughter, Amanda Pooley, who died in 1989. In 1994, Beaumont married cinematographer Michael J Davis. The two remained together until Davis' death in 2008.

Beaumont was the cousin of Daphne du Maurier.

== Filmography ==
| Year | Title | Notes | Ref. |
|---|---|---|---|
| 1971 | The Johnstown Monster | Producer | |
| 1971 | Crucible of Horror | Producer | |
| 1973–1976 | Good Afternoon! | | |
| 1974 | Marked Personal | 8 episodes | |
| 1975 | Couples | 2 episodes | |
| 1977 | Rooms | 3 episodes | |
| 1978 | Shadows | Episode: "The Silver Apple" | |
| 1978 | The Tomorrow People | 2 episodes | |
| 1978–1980 | Rainbow | | |
| 1980 | The Godsend | | |
| 1980 | Vega$ | Episode: "Sudden Death" | |
| 1980–1981 | Secrets of Midland Heights | 2 episodes | |
| 1981 | The Waltons | Episode: "The Tempest" | |
| 1981 | M*A*S*H | Episode: "The Red/White Blues" | |
| 1981 | The Greatest American Hero | 2 episodes | |
| 1981 | Death of a Centerfold: The Dorothy Stratten Story | | |
| 1981 | Knots Landing | 2 episodes | |
| 1981–1982 | Dynasty | 4 episodes | |
| 1982 | The Dukes of Hazzard | Episode: "Bad Day in Hazzard" | |
| 1982 | Archie Bunker's Place | Episode: "The Second Time Around" | |
| 1982 | Private Benjamin | 6 episodes | |
| 1982–1983 | Hart to Hart | 5 episodes | |
| 1983 | Zorro and Son | 2 episodes | |
| 1983 | Secrets of a Mother and Daughter | TV movie | |
| 1983–1986 | Hill Street Blues | 7 episodes | |
| 1984 | AfterMASH | Episode: "By the Book" | |
| 1984 | Gone Are the Dayes | TV movie | |
| 1984 | Hammer House of Mystery and Suspense | Episode: "The Corvini Inheritance" | |
| 1984 | Cagney & Lacey | Episode: "Lady Luck" | |
| 1984–1985 | Glitter | 2 episodes | |
| 1985–1986 | Remington Steele | 3 episodes | |
| 1985–1986 | Hotel | 4 episodes | |
| 1986 | The Colbys | 2 episodes | |
| 1987 | Miami Vice | 2 episodes | |
| 1987 | Duet | Episode: "Elegy" | |
| 1987 | He's My Girl | | |
| 1987 | Beauty and the Beast | Episode: "A Children's Story" | |
| 1988 | A Year in the Life | 2 episodes | |
| 1988 | ABC Afterschool Special | Episode: "Tattle: When to Tell on a Friend" | |
| 1988–1992 | L.A. Law | 4 episodes | |
| 1989 | Beverly Hills Buntz | 2 episodes | |
| 1989 | Dirty Dancing | Episode: "Don't Make Me Over" | |
| 1989 | Studio 5-B | Episode: "The Aftermath" | |
| 1989 | Nightmare Classics | Episode: "Carmilla" | |
| 1989 | The Paradise Club | 2 episodes | |
| 1989–1992 | Doogie Howser, M.D. | 3 episodes | |
| 1989–1994 | Star Trek: The Next Generation | 7 episodes | |
| 1990 | TECX | 2 episodes | |
| 1990 | Screen One | Episode: "One Last Chance" | |
| 1991 | Palace Guard | Episode: "Eye of Newt" | |
| 1992 | The Fifth Corner | Episode "Women at her Toilette"; Unaired | |
| 1993 | Riders | TV movie | |
| 1993 | Law & Order | Episode: "Apocrypha" | |
| 1993 | seaQuest DSV | Episode: "SeaWest" | |
| 1993 | Fatal Inheritance | TV movie | |
| 1994 | Moment of Truth: Cradle of Conspiracy | TV movie | |
| 1994 | The Other Woman | TV movie | |
| 1994–1998 | Beverly Hills, 90210 | 2 episodes | |
| 1995 | Vanishing Son | 2 episodes | |
| 1996 | Dr. Quinn, Medicine Woman | 2 episodes | |
| 1996 | Beastmaster III: The Eye of Braxus | TV movie | |
| 1996 | The Pretender | Episode: "The Paper Clock" | |
| 1997 | Star Trek: Deep Space Nine | Episode: "In Purgatory's Shadow" | |
| 1997 | Pacific Palisades | Episode: "Best Laid Plans" | |
| 1997 | 7th Heaven | 3 episodes | |
| 1997 | Touched by an Angel | 3 episodes | |
| 1998 | Diana: A Tribute to the People's Princess | TV movie | |
| 1998 | Melrose Place | Episode: "Suddenly Sperm | |
| 2000 | Star Trek: Voyager | Episode: "Blink of an Eye" | |
| 2000 | Baywatch | 2 episodes | |
