= Christine Hargreaves =

English actress (1939–1984)

- Hargreaves as Christine Appleby in Coronation Street
- Born: 22 March 1939; Salford, Lancashire, England
- Died: 9 August 1984 (aged 45) (Note: Most sources incorrectly reported her date of death as 12 August 1984.); Fitzrovia, London, England
- Other name: Christine Voormann
- Education: Royal Academy of Dramatic Art
- Occupation: Actress
- Years active: 1958–1984
- Known for: Role of Christine Hardman in Coronation Street (1960–1963)
- Spouse: Klaus Voormann (m. 1965; sep. 1971)
- Children: 1

Christine Hargreaves (22 March 1939 – 9 August 1984) was an English actress. She was known for her role of Christine Hardman in the ITV soap opera Coronation Street (1960–1963).

== Early life ==
Christine Hargreaves was born in Salford, Greater Manchester, England on 22 March 1939, as the third child to John 'Jack' Hargreaves, a wholesale grocer and provision merchants traveller, and his second wife, Jessie (née Walter), a domestic worker. She had three siblings; Ann Knowles (née Hargreaves), Robert Christopher Hargreaves, and Ian W Hargreaves. She also had two half-siblings, Dorothy Hubbard (née Hargreaves) and Sergeant John Alfred Hargreaves, from her father's first marriage to Phyllis (née Barlow), who died during the birth of her half-brother, John, in 1923, at the age of 23; John was killed in action in Heiteren, Haut-Rhin, France, in 1944, aged 20, during the Second World War.

== Career ==
Hargreaves trained in acting at the Royal Academy of Dramatic Art. She graduated with her Honours Diploma in 1958. She went on to tour as an understudy with The Old Vic.

Hargreaves made her television debut with the role of Christine Hardman in the ITV soap opera Coronation Street. She was one of the first actors to read for Tony Warren's new script 'Florizel Street' (later renamed Coronation Street). She played the character in the dry runs, before the show was even commissioned for broadcast, alongside Pat Phoenix (Elsie Tanner) and Doris Speed (Annie Walker), among others. She appeared in the first ever episode, which was broadcast on 9 December 1960. As a result of the Equity actors strike, she was unable to have her contract renewed and ended up leaving the show in December 1961, as did many other cast members of the time. She briefly returned and left the serial in episode 267, which was broadcast on 3 July 1963.

Hargreaves made her film debut with the role of Linda Rich in the second feature comedy film Strictly for the Birds. The film was directed by Vernon Sewell and released on 29 March 1964. She portrayed Kath in the drama film The Reckoning (1970). She portrayed Doreen in the drama film The Hireling (1973). She portrayed Mrs. Butterworth in It Shouldn't Happen to a Vet, the 1976 sequel to the 1975 film All Creatures Great and Small. She portrayed Ticket Lady in the comedy horror film An American Werewolf in London (1981). She portrayed Pink's Mother in the live-action/animated musical surrealist drama film Pink Floyd – The Wall (1982).

Hargreaves portrayed Dawn on the seventh episode in the second series of the ITV sitcom Pardon the Expression, made by Granada Television. The episode, "Big Hotel", was broadcast on 21 February 1966. The series was one of four spin-offs from Coronation Street.

== Personal life ==
Hargreaves "secretly" married Klaus Otto Wilhelm Voormann, a German artist and musician, at Hampstead Register Office in London on 29 November 1965. They split their time between their home, 65 Pepys Road, Wimbledon, London, and their cottage, 115 Heath Street, Hampstead. As they travelled to West Berlin often to visit her in-laws, she decided to learn how to speak the German language. She took lessons for several weeks, but failed to pick up her husband's mother tongue. Speaking on this, she said: "The trouble is my husband is absolutely no help at all. He doesn't like speaking German, and he won't use anything but English at home." She became close friends with the rock band The Beatles and their manager Brian Epstein. She was partially close friends with some of the band members partners, including Cynthia Powell, Maureen Cox, Pattie Boyd, Yoko Ono, Linda Eastman, May Pang, and Olivia Arias. The couple separated in 1971, after five years of marriage. While not legally separated, her estranged husband moved out of their home to live at George Harrison's Friar Park in Henley-on-Thames, Oxfordshire. During their marriage, she was known as Christine Voorman.

In January 1975, Hargreaves gave birth to her only child, a daughter, Rosie Weeks Hargreaves. Speculation arose as to whether her daughter had been fathered by her husband, whom, at the time, she had been separated from for over three years, as birth records show her daughter was first registered under the name of Christine Voormann. A single mother, she raised her daughter on Social Security for a year.

== Death ==
Hargreaves died "peacefully" at University College Hospital in Fitzrovia, London, on 9 August 1984, following a brain operation. She was 45. Her death was registered in Camden. Her death was announced to the public three days later, on 12 August 1984.

Hargreaves' funeral service and committal took place at Peel Green Crematorium in Eccles on 16 August 1984. Only a handful of her family and friends were in attendance. The cast of Coronation Street sent a wreath.

On 26 September 1984, an inquest was told that she died from a spontaneous brain haemorrhage. They also heard how her nine-year-old daughter had found her mother unconscious. A verdict of natural causes were recorded by the St Pancras Coroner, Dr. Douglas Chambers, having been told she had undergone surgery for a brain haemorrhage three years prior to her death. Her sister, Ann Knowles, told the coroner that her sister had periodically suffered from fits.

Hargreaves' probate was opened in Oxford on 16 November 1984, totalling £56,296.

== Filmography ==
Year	Title	Role	Notes
1960	Coronation Street: First Dry Run	Christine Hardman (later Appleby)	Pilot episode
1960–1963	Coronation Street	Christine Hardman (later Appleby)	122 episodes
1962, 1964, 1967, 1969, 1971–1972, 1978	Z-Cars	Fran Edgar, Doris Harvey, Jackie, Zelda, Marjorie Kovacs, Miss Armstrong, Maggie, Dotty Kardar	9 episodes
1962, 1964	Play of the Week	Alice Hobson, Barmaid	2 episodes
1963	Suspense	Rita	Episode: "Two Bits of Iron"
1963	Friday Night	Barbara, Jo Page	2 episodes
1964	Strictly for the Birds	Linda Rich	
1964	Story Parade	Marigold	Episode: "Brake Pedal Down"
1964	Drama 61-67	Anita	Episode: "Drama '64: The Big Toe"
1965	The Villains	Delia Graham	Episode: "Sonny"
1965	Out of the Unknown	Monica Wilkes	Episode: "Come Buttercup, Come Daisy, Come......?"
1966	Pardon the Expression	Dawn	Episode: "Big Hotel"
1967–1968, 1970	The Wednesday Play	Mary Winter, Doreen, Jane Evans, Jenny Bates	4 episodes
1967	Softly, Softly	Terry	Episode: "The Investors"
1967	The Fellows	Jean	Episode: "No Cage for This Bird"
1967	Send Foster	Mrs. Simpson	Episode: "The Peg"
1967	Inheritance	Winnie Shaw, Winnie Morcar	2 episodes
1968	The War of Dickie Pilbeam	Marie Pilbeam	3 episodes
1969	Sunday Night Theatre	Sheila	Episode: "Bangelstein's Boys"
1969	The First Lady	Sylvia	Episode: "Blow Hot, Blow Cold"
1969, 1972	Dear Mother...Love Albert	Gillian Jones, Moira	6 episodes
1969	Omnibus	Chrissey Evans	Episode: "The Confessions of Marian Evans/George Eliot"
1970, 1972, 1978, 1981	Play for Today	Cynthia Nicholls, Joan Huntley, Pauline, Mrs. James, Estelle Parsons	5 episodes
1970	The Reckoning	Kath	
1970	The Doctors	Mrs. Pike	3 episodes
1972	Horace	Ivy Blackett	Television film
1972, 1976	Softly, Softly: Task Force	Mrs. Taylor, Jean Marshall	2 episodes
1973	And All Who Sail in Her	Gloria	Television film
1973	Putting on the Agony	Phyllis	Television film
1973	The Hireling	Doreen	
1973	Shabby Tiger	Olga Kepple	4 episodes
1973	Love Story	Beryl	Episode: "The String-Tying Machine"
1975	The Venturers	Jane Carter	Episode: "Sentimental Journey"
1976	It Shouldn't Happen to a Vet	Mrs. Butterworth	
1976, 1978, 1982	Crown Court	Doreen Grimwade, Eva Scott, Nora Docherty	7 episodes
1976	Play of the Month		Episode: "Chester Mystery Cycle"
1977	For the Love of Albert	Various	4 episodes
1978	Send in the Girls	Rosemary	Episode: "A Hardy Breed of Girl"
1978	A Horseman Riding By	Gloria Pitts	2 episodes
1979	In Loving Memory	Edna Fletcher	Episode: "Come Back Little Malcolm"
1980, 1982–1983	Juliet Bravo	Vera Galway, Selina Tully, Norah Morton	3 episodes
1981	An American Werewolf in London	Ticket Lady	
1982	BBC2 Playhouse	Fran	Episode: "Jake's End"
1982	Pink Floyd – The Wall	Pink's Mother	
1982	Playhouse	Mum	Episode: "Grandad"
1982	Break Point	Mrs. Grieves	4 episodes
1983	Walter	Rita	Television film
1983	Women		Episode: "The Clarion Van"
1983	The Gathering Seed	Lizzie Scanlon	5 episodes
1983	Spyship	Jean Williams	3 episodes
1984	Miracles Take Longer	Sharon Driver	2 episodes
1984	Charlie	Mo Allen	Episode: "In the Days of His Youth"

=== Posthumous releases ===
Year	Title	Role	Notes
1984	Mitch	Mrs. Goosey	Episode: "Something Private"
1984	Nineteen Eighty-Four	Soup Lady	
1985	Victoria Wood: As Seen on TV	Pat's Mother	Episode: "Episode #1.1"
1985	1919		

Ref(s).
