= All Creatures Great and Small (franchise) =

British media franchise

- logo of the franchise
- Created by: James Herriot (book series); Bill Sellars (original TV series); Young James Herriot: Johnny Byrne and Kate Croft
- Original work: If Only They Could Talk (book)

Print publications
- Book(s): List of books

Films and television
- Film(s): All Creatures Great and Small (1975); It Shouldn't Happen to a Vet (1976)
- Television series: All Creatures Great and Small (1978–1990); Young James Herriot (2011); All Creatures Great and Small (2020–present)

Audio
- Soundtrack(s): All Creatures Great and Small: The Original Music from the TV Series and Other Favourite Themes (1978)

Miscellaneous
- Theme park attraction(s): The World of James Herriot

The All Creatures Great and Small franchise consists of a series of books, films, and TV series based on books written 1970–1981 by James Alfred Wight under the pen name James Herriot based on his experiences as a veterinary surgeon. The books have been adapted for film and television, including a 1975 film All Creatures Great and Small, followed by the 1976 It Shouldn't Happen to a Vet sequel, as well as a long-running BBC television programme of the same title, and a prequel series in 2011, Young James Herriot.

By 2020, the series of books featuring James Herriot had sold some 60 million copies. In that year, the next television production was aired, All Creatures Great and Small. The programme, produced for Channel 5 in the UK and PBS in the United States, has produced five series as of 2025.

== Books ==
The book series focuses on the adventures of veterinary surgeon James Herriot and is set in the Yorkshire Dales, in the fictional town of Darrowby, based on a combination of Thirsk, Richmond, Leyburn and Middleham. In the books, Herriot works with fellow veterinary surgeons Siegfried and Tristan Farnon, based on real-life counterparts, Donald Sinclair and his brother Brian Sinclair respectively. Wight used the name Helen Alderson for his real-life wife, Joan Danbury. Danbury in real life was not a farmer's daughter, but worked as a secretary. According to one source, "contrary to the stories, Alf Wight met her in a group outing to a local dance. Evidently, he felt she was worth pursuing from the first, though she had a number of boyfriends and admirers."

In addition to the primary books listed below, a series of nine James Herriot Children's Picture Books were published. Another 12 books, considered to be anthologies (with content taken from various of the primary books) was also published, some in the UK and others in the U.S.

=== UK series ===
- If Only They Could Talk (1970) ISBN 0-330-23783-7
- It Shouldn't Happen to a Vet (1972) ISBN 0-330-23782-9
- Let Sleeping Vets Lie (1973) ISBN 978-0-7181-1115-1
- Vet in Harness (1974) ISBN 0-330-24663-1
- Vets Might Fly (1976) ISBN 0-330-25221-6
- Vet in a Spin (1977) ISBN 0-330-25532-0
- The Lord God Made Them All (1981) ISBN 0-7181-2026-4
- Every Living Thing (1992) ISBN 0-7181-3637-3

=== U.S. series ===
In the United States, the books were collected as pairs into omnibus volumes because the publisher thought they were too short to publish independently. The title for the first book in the series All Creatures Great and Small (and subsequently of the film and television series) was taken from the hymn "All Things Bright and Beautiful". According to Herriot's son, it was his sister who suggested the title, initially proposing All Creatures Great and Small.

- All Creatures Great and Small (1972) (incorporating If Only They Could Talk and It Shouldn't Happen to a Vet) ISBN 0-330-25049-3
- All Things Bright and Beautiful (1974) (incorporating Let Sleeping Vets Lie and Vet in Harness) ISBN 0-330-25580-0
- All Things Wise and Wonderful (1977) (incorporating Vets Might Fly and Vet in a Spin) ISBN 0-7181-1685-2
- The Lord God Made Them All (1980)
- Every Living Thing (1981)
- James Herriot's Dog Stories (1986) (compilation drawn from his four original books)

== Media overview ==
	Films		Television series		
	All Creatures Great and Small	It Shouldn't Happen to a Vet	All Creatures Great and Small	Young James Herriot	All Creatures Great and Small
Year of Release	1975	1976	1978–1990	2011	2020
Based on	If Only They Could Talk (1970); It Shouldn't Happen to a Vet (1972)	Let Sleeping Vets Lie (1973); Vet in Harness (1974)	If Only They Could Talk (1970); It Shouldn't Happen to a Vet (1972)	The Herriot archive and the archives of the Glasgow Veterinary College.	If Only They Could Talk (1970); It Shouldn't Happen to a Vet (1972)
Director	Claude Whatham	Eric Till	Various	Michael Keillor	Various
Writer	Hugh Whitemore	Alan Plater	Various	Ann McManus; Eileen Gallagher	Various
Cast and Characters
James Herriot	Simon Ward	John Alderton	Christopher Timothy	Iain De Caestecker	Nicholas Ralph
Siegfried Farnon	Anthony Hopkins	Colin Blakely	Robert Hardy		Samuel West
Tristan Farnon	Brian Stirner		Peter Davison		Callum Woodhouse
Helen Alderson	Lisa Harrow		Carol Drinkwater (S1-3); Lynda Bellingham (S4-7)		Rachel Shenton
Mrs. Hall	Christine Buckley		Mary Hignett		Anna Madeley
Mrs Pumphrey	Daphne Oxenford		Margaretta Scott		Diana Rigg (S1); Patricia Hodge (from S2)
Jeff Mallock	John Rees		Frank Birch (S1-3); Fred Feast (S4-7)		
Hinchcliffe		Bill Maynard			
Calum Buchanan			John McGlynn		
Whirly Tyson				Amy Manson	
Rob McAloon				Ben Lloyd-Hughes	

== Films ==
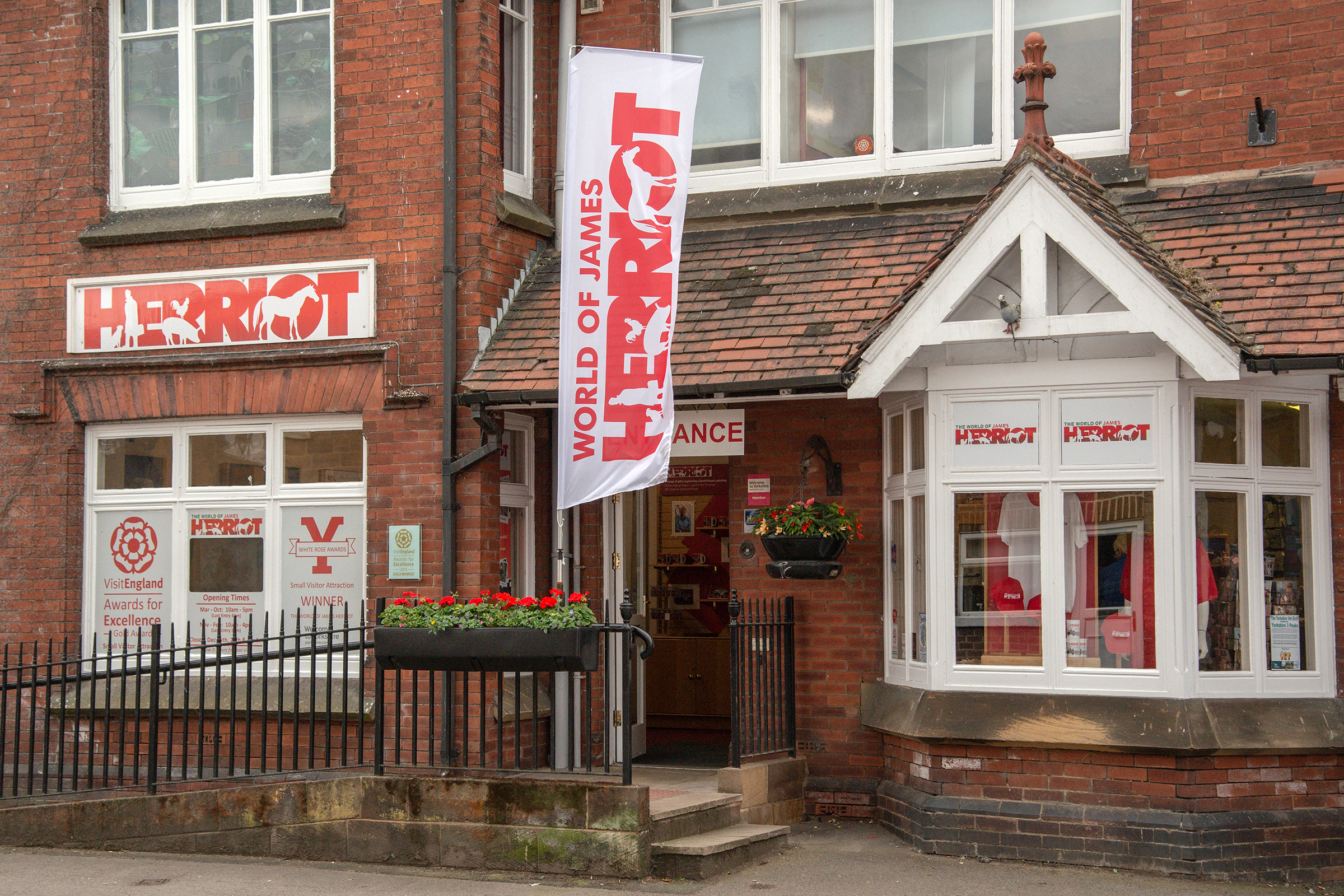
The World of James Herriot Museum in Thirsk

=== All Creatures Great and Small (1975) ===
All Creatures Great and Small is based on the first two novels, If Only They Could Talk (1970) and It Shouldn't Happen to a Vet (1972), and was given the same title as the 1972 U.S. compilation volume of these two novels. It was released in 1975. It was directed by Claude Whatham, and written by Hugh Whitemore, and starred Simon Ward as James Herriot and Anthony Hopkins as Siegfried Farnon.

=== It Shouldn't Happen to a Vet (1976) ===
It Shouldn't Happen to a Vet is based on the two subsequent novels, Let Sleeping Vets Lie (1973) and Vet in Harness (1974), and was released in 1976. It was directed by Eric Till, written by Alan Plater, and starred John Alderton as James Herriot and Colin Blakely as Siegfried Farnon.

== Television ==
=== All Creatures Great and Small (1978–1990) ===
All Creatures Great and Small is a BBC television series based initially on the first two books, If Only They Could Talk (1970) and It Shouldn't Happen to a Vet (1972). As the novels are written in an episodic style, with each chapter generally containing a short story within the ongoing narrative of Herriot's life, this facilitated their adaptation for a television series by producer Bill Sellars. The series stars Christopher Timothy as James Herriot and Robert Hardy as Siegfried Farnon, and it had two runs: the original (1978 to 1980, based directly on Herriot's books) was for three series; the second (1988 to 1990, filmed with original scripts) for four. Series 4 saw the introduction of new vet, Calum Buchanan (John McGlynn), based on Herriot's real-life assistant Brian Nettleton. A total of ninety episodes were broadcast.

=== Young James Herriot (2011) ===
Young James Herriot is a three-part BBC television series based on the life of veterinary student James Herriot. It was based on notes in the Herriot archive and the archives of the Glasgow Veterinary College, including the diaries and case notes the author kept during his student years, and was produced with the cooperation of his family. The series was directed by Michael Keillor and written by Ann McManus and Eileen Gallagher. It stars Iain De Caestecker as Herriot, with Amy Manson and Ben Lloyd-Hughes as fellow students Whirly Tyson and Rob McAloon.

=== All Creatures Great and Small (2020–present) ===
In 2019, Channel 5 announced it would be filming a new series in the Yorkshire Dales over the summer of 2019, to be broadcast the following year. Instead of using Askrigg as the filming base, the producers decided on Grassington, due to the former's A roads detracting from the 1930s look they wanted. There was never a plan to film in Thirsk where the actual James Herriot (Alf Wight) practiced because it had become too large for the small-town feel that the series wanted.

Significant changes were made from the source material (both the previous television series and the memoir), such as Siegfried Farnon being a heartbroken widower and a dramatically increased role for Mrs. Hall, who has been reimagined as a young, live-in housekeeper and a "slightly warmer figure" than in the novels. The role of Helen was also greatly expanded.

This first series consisted of six episodes plus a Christmas special and aired first on Channel 5 in 2020 and then in early 2021 on PBS in the United States. All Creatures Great and Small was renewed for a second series. All of the principal actors were expected to return to their roles. It was scheduled to begin filming in the Yorkshire Dales in late March 2021.

== The World of James Herriot ==
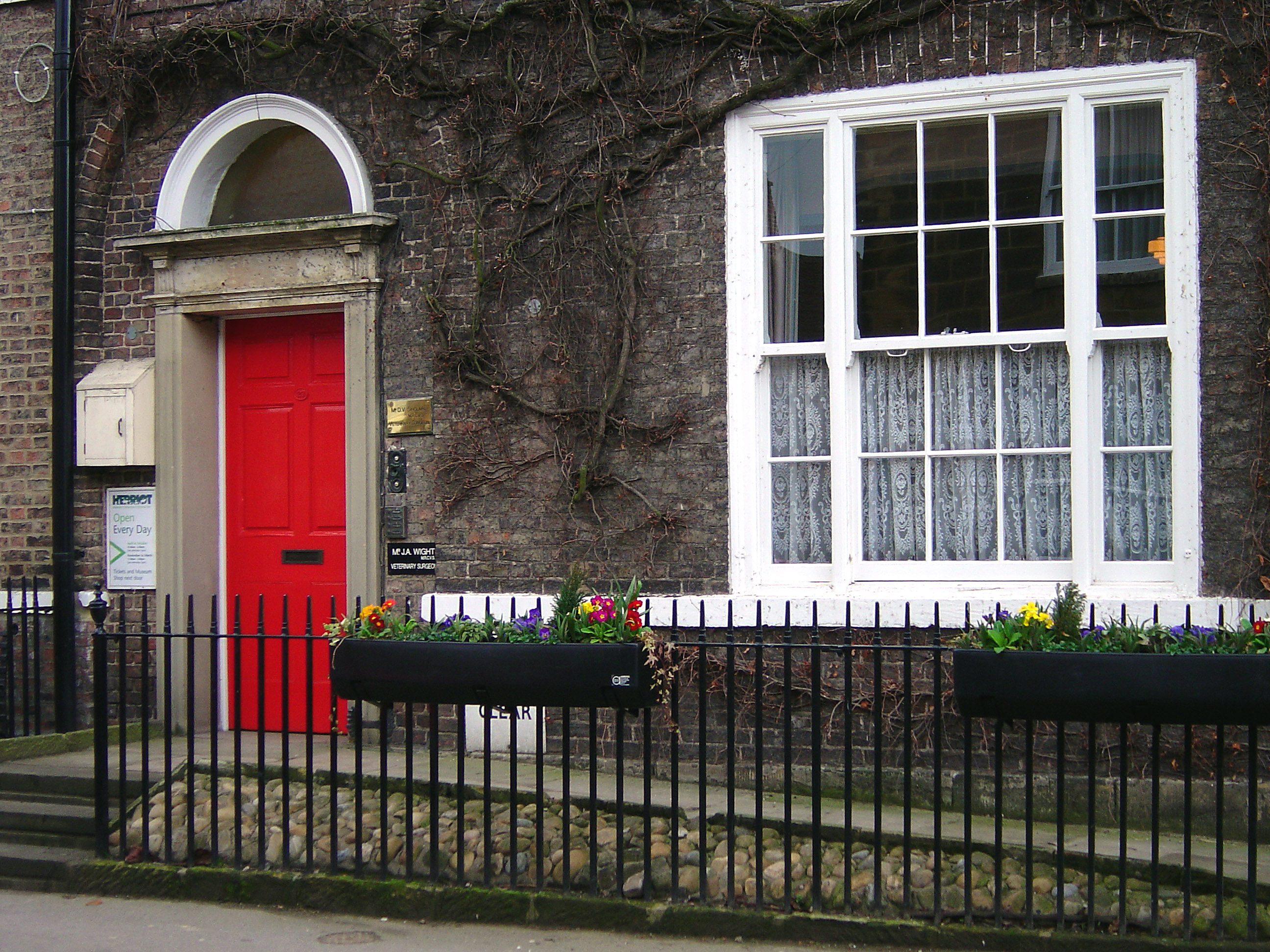
The veterinary surgery of Alf Wight (James Herriot) and his partners in Thirsk, a museum; (2009 photo)

The World of James Herriot is a writer's home museum attraction in Thirsk, North Yorkshire, England.

The museum was set up in 1999 by Hambleton District Council; the business was sold to private investors in 2011 and was re-generated in 2017. Council leases the building to the operators but retains ownership of the structure. As of February 2021, the World of James Herriot Ltd board included the daughter and son of Alf Wight: Rosie Page and retired vet Jim Wight, in addition to a group of "local businessmen and women".

== See also ==
- All Creatures Great and Small
