= All Creatures Great and Small =

All Creatures Great and Small may refer to:

- All Creatures Great and Small (franchise), a series of books, films and TV shows based on the works of James Herriot
  - All Creatures Great and Small, a compilation book by James Herriot, comprising his first two novels
  - All Creatures Great and Small (film), a 1975 film adaptation of the same two novels
  - All Creatures Great and Small (1978 TV series), a BBC television adaptation originally based on the same two novels
  - All Creatures Great and Small (2020 TV series), a television adaptation originally based on the first novel
- "All creatures great and small", a line from the hymn "All Things Bright and Beautiful"
- All Creatures Great and Small, a 1963 book by Daniel P. Mannix
- All Creatures Great and Small: Veterinary Surgery as a Career (My Life & My Work), a 1972 book by Mary Brancker
