= Nancy Astor (TV series) =

British television series

- Genre: Drama
- Written by: Derek Marlowe
- Directed by: Richard Stroud
- Starring: Lisa Harrow; James Fox; Pierce Brosnan
- Composer: Stanley Myers
- Country of origin: United Kingdom
- Original language: English
- No. of series: 1
- No. of episodes: 9

Production
- Producer: Philip Hinchcliffe
- Running time: 55 minutes
- Production company: BBC

Original release
- Network: BBC 2
- Release: 10 February – 7 April 1982

Nancy Astor is a British nine-part television series which originally aired on BBC Two in 1982. It portrays the career of Nancy Astor, the American-born socialite and Conservative Party politician who was the first woman Member of Parliament in the British House of Commons.

== Main cast ==
- Lisa Harrow as Nancy Astor
- Lise Hilboldt as Phyllis Langhorne
- James Fox as Waldorf Astor
- Dan O'Herlihy as Chiswell 'Chillie' Langhorne
- Nigel Havers as Bobby Shaw
- Pierce Brosnan as Robert Gould Shaw
- David Warner as Philip Kerr
- Erick Ray Evans as Sam
- Sylvia Syms as Nanaire Langhorne
- Lillian Silverstone as Irene
- William Hope as Harry Langhorne
- Dallas Adams as Dana Gibson
- Neil McCarthy as Reverend Neve
- Bernard Brown as Robert Brand
- Natalie Caron as Emma
- Paul McDowell as Lee
- Julian Glover as Lord Revelstoke
- Daniel Chatto as Billy Grenfell
- Isabelle Lucas as Aunt Liza
- Edmond Bennett as Stationmaster
- Victoria Burgoyne as Lucy
- Jeff Harding as Freddie
- Robert Arden as Quincy Shaw
- Richard Trent as Groom
- Terence Brook as Speaker
- Jon Croft as Parr
- Desmond Cullum-Jones as Webb
- Marsha Fitzalan as Wissie Astor
- Mary Healey as Rose
- Rosalind Knight as Margot Asquith
- Robert Mill as Speaker
- John Paul as Balfour
- Robert Raglan as MP
- Hugh Thomas as Mackenzie
- Fraser Wilson as Henry Douglas-Pennant
- David Yelland as David Astor
- Annabelle Lanyon as younger Nancy Langhorne
- Jeni Toksvig as younger Phyllis Langhorne

== Plot summary ==
Nancy Leghorne grows up in Virginia after the American Civil War. Her family, like many others in the state, is poor but her father gets a job building railroads and becomes wealthy enough to buy a small country estate. Nancy often feels unsettled. Her eldest sister Irene is sent away to New York City to 'become a lady', and in due course marries a wealthy painter. Nancy in her turn is sent to New York and introduced into society. She attracts the attention of Robert Gould Shaw, a young man from a rich family.

Nancy falls in love with Shaw and they become engaged. Despite initial resistance from both their families they marry, although Shaw retains a secret mistress until just before the wedding. The wedding goes well. However, their honeymoon in Richmond is disastrous due to Nancy's fear of sex. She returns to her family, but is persuaded to try again with Shaw.

Later they are living in Massachusetts, but the marriage is still hampered by Nancy's frequent reluctance to sleep with Shaw. He drinks heavily, and the marriage disintegrates. She leaves him but is pregnant. After having son Bobby, she returns to her family home, and under pressure agrees to a divorce so that Shaw can remarry. Her mother dies soon afterwards. Nancy keeps house for her father, but he sends her along with sister Phyllis to England, so that she can make a fresh start in life.

In England, Nancy becomes popular in society, meeting people such as Margot Asquith, Ettie Grenfell and Harry Cust. She gains an admirer in Lord Revelstoke but refuses his proposal of marriage after the press exposes his illicit relationship with Ettie, who is married. Nancy grows tired of the emptiness of society life. However, on an ocean voyage she meets the very wealthy Waldorf Astor, and their friendship grows to the point where she accepts his proposal. They marry.

Nancy sets about changing the Astors' Cliveden estate to her taste, and starts to have further children. At her instigation, and with the help of Lord Curzon, Waldorf is nominated by the Conservative Party for a Parliamentary seat in Plymouth. Although reluctant and affected by ill-health, Astor wins it at the second attempt, due in part to active election campaigning by Nancy. On the domestic front, Nancy gains an aristocratic and intellectual admirer in Philip Kerr, but faces problems with her elder son Bobby.

Nancy becomes ill, but recovers when she and Kerr become Christian Scientists. Life is disrupted by World War I, with Cliveden becoming a military convalescent hospital which Nancy supports enthusiastically. Nancy's father dies. Bobby and others join the Army, and this leads to some deaths including Phyllis' husband and two Grenfell sons. Astor's father accepts a peerage, which leads to a rift between them as Waldorf would be unable to sit as an MP in the Commons when he inherits the peerage. His father does die soon, and in a bold move Astor nominates Nancy to stand for the Plymouth seat in his stead. She wins, becoming only the second woman to be elected to the Commons and the first to take her seat. She becomes a good speaker, but has to battle to retain her position when it becomes known that she concealed her divorced status. During the 1920s Nancy and Astor face many problems with Bobby, whose behaviour sees him forced to leave the Army. He meets his father briefly, but is later arrested for committing a homosexual act in public.

Through the 1930s Nancy continues as an MP, but her strident Christian Science beliefs and intolerant attitudes lead to estrangement from some family and friends. She misjudges the threat from Nazi Germany and attracts public criticism. Two of her siblings die, and Bobby sets up home with a discreet male partner.

In World War II Cliveden again becomes a military hospital, while Nancy and Waldorf try to help the people of Plymouth during the Blitz; in Parliament she criticises civil defence measures. As her mental state declines further she gives up her seat. Her growing fanaticism and madness make it difficult for her family to look after her, until her death in 1964 aged 82.

== Bibliography ==
- Vahimagi, Tise, ed. (1996). British Television: An Illustrated Guide. Oxford University Press.
