= Margaret Whiting (actress) =

British actress (1933–2023)

- Born: Margaret Elizabeth Whiting; 8 February 1933; Bristol, England
- Died: 13 December 2023 (aged 90); London, England
- Occupation: Actress
- Years active: 1956–1999
- Spouse: Colin Blakely (m. 1961; died 1987)
- Children: 3

Margaret Elizabeth Whiting (8 February 1933 – 13 December 2023) was a British actress. She was nominated in 1978 for a Saturn Award as "Best Supporting Actress" in Sinbad and the Eye of the Tiger. She was an alumna and Associate Member of RADA.

Whiting was married to actor Colin Blakely from 1961 until his death in 1987; the couple had three sons, including twins. She died in St Thomas' Hospital, London on 13 December 2023, at the age of 90.

== Theatre ==
- 1956: Timon of Athens at Old Vic Theatre
- 1956–1957: Titus Andronicus, The Comedy of Errors, and Antony and Cleopatra at the Old Vic Theatre
- 1973: Titus Andronicus at the Aldwych Theatre
- 1974–1976: John Gabriel Borkman, The Grand Manoeuvres, Equus, Heartbreak House, No Man's Land, Happy Days, The Misanthrope, Comedians, Phaedra Britannica, Engaged, The Playboy of the Western World, Plunder, Hamlet, and Judgement at the Old Vic Theatre
- 1976: Tamburlaine the Great, The Playboy of the Western World, Il Campiello, Hamlet, Counting the Ways at the Olivier Theatre
- 1984: The Way of the World as Mrs. Marwood at the Haymarket

== Filmography ==
- The Password Is Courage – French farm woman (1962)
- The Informers – Maisie Barton (1963)
- The Counterfeit Constable – La femme de l'agent 202 (1964)
- Mister Quilp – Mrs. Jiniwin (1975)
- Sinbad and the Eye of the Tiger – Zenobia (1977)
- The Secret Garden – Nurse Boggs (1987)

== TV work ==
- Those Whiting Girls – Desilu Studios (1955-1957) (TV serial)
- The Count of Monte Cristo: A Toy For The Infanta – Queen Maria (1956) (TV serial)
- Theatre 70: Till Murder Do Us Part (1960) (TV serial)
- The Cheaters: The Weasel – Jane (1960) (TV serial)
- ITV Play of the Week: The Plough and the Stars – Nora Clitheroe (1961) (TV serial)
- BBC Sunday-Night Play: Somewhere for the Night – Kitty (1961) (TV serial)
- No Hiding Place – Blanche Farrel (1961) (TV serial)
- The Avengers: The Yellow Needle – Jacquetta Brown (1961) (TV serial)
- ITV Play of the Week: A Letter from the General – Sister Henry (1962) (TV serial)
- Studio 4: Summer Storm – Elena (1962) (TV serial)
- Crane: The Third Bullet – Tina Mondrego (1964) (TV serial)
- The Human Jungle: Struggle for a Mind – Angie (1964) (TV serial)
- Festival: Six Characters in Search of an Author – Step-daughter (1964) (TV serial)
- ITV Play of the Week: The Wife of Knightsbridge – Perdita Street (1964) (TV serial)
- Public Eye – Nancy Heuston (1965) (TV serial)
- Thursday Theatre – Juliette (1965) (TV serial)
- Knock on Any Door: The Machine Minder – Alice Hall (1965) (TV serial)
- Undermind: Too Many Enemies – Alice (1965) (TV serial)
- No Hiding Place – Clare Store (1965) (TV serial)
- Armchair Theatre – Betty (1965) (TV serial)
- BBC Plays: The House (1965) (TV serial)
- Love Story: A Dream In The Afternoon – Kate (1967) (TV serial)
- Public Eye: The Beater and the Game – Margaret Smeaton (1971) (TV serial)
- The Strauss Family – Hetti (1972) (TV serial)
- ITV Sunday Night Theatre: Before Paris – Ruth (1972) (TV serial)
- Two Women – Cesira (1973) (TV serial)
- The Sweeney: Hit and Run – Fladge (1975) (TV serial)
- Play for Today: The After Dinner Game – Gaynor Humbolt (1975) (TV serial)
- Public Eye: Fit of Conscience – Evelyn Friendly (1975) (TV serial)
- Disraeli – Lady Blessington (1978) (TV serial)
- BBC2 Play of the Week: Langrishe Go Down – Maureen Layde (1978) (TV serial)
- BBC2 Playhouse: Going Gently – Sister Marvin (1981) (TV serial)
- Artemis 81 – Laura Guise (1981) (TV play)
- Jury – Ann Coombs (1983) (TV serial)
- Shroud for a Nightingale – Delia Dettinger (1984)
- C.A.T.S. Eyes: Good as New – Mrs. Walker (1986) (TV serial)
- Rumpole of the Bailey: Rumpole for the Prosecution – Mrs. Fabian (1991) (TV serial)
- McCallum: City of Dead – Victoria Wells (1998) (TV serial)
- Let Them Eat Cake – 2nd Aristocratic Woman (1999) (TV serial)
