= Star Cops =

1987 British science fiction TV series

- Created by: Chris Boucher
- Starring: David Calder; Erick Ray Evans; Trevor Cooper; Linda Newton; Jonathan Adams; Sayo Inaba
- Theme music composer: "It Won't be Easy" written and performed by Justin Hayward
- Country of origin: United Kingdom
- Original language: English
- No. of series: 1
- No. of episodes: 9

Production
- Producer: Evgeny Gridneff
- Camera setup: Multicamera
- Running time: c. 50 min. per episode

Original release
- Network: BBC 2
- Release: 6 July – 31 August 1987

Star Cops is a British science fiction television drama series first broadcast on BBC2 in 1987. It was devised by Chris Boucher, a writer who had previously worked on the science fiction television series Doctor Who and Blake's 7, as well as crime dramas such as Juliet Bravo and Bergerac.

Set in the year 2027, a time when Interplanetary travel has become commonplace, it starred David Calder as Nathan Spring, commander of the International Space Police Force—nicknamed the "Star Cops"—who provide law enforcement for the newly developing colonies of the Solar System. The series follows Nathan Spring and the rest of his multinational team as they work to establish the Star Cops and solve whatever crimes come their way. Operating in a relatively accurately realised hard SF, near-future, space environment, many of the cases that the Star Cops investigate arise from opportunities for new crimes presented by the technologically advanced future society the series depicts and from the hostile frontier nature of the environment that the Star Cops live in.

In total nine episodes were made. A tenth, "Death on the Moon", was planned but industrial relations difficulties during production led to abandonment shortly before recording was to commence. A combination of factors, including conflict between Boucher and producer Gridneff, and poor scheduling, meant that the series never found a satisfactory audience and the series was cancelled after one season. In recent years, Star Cops has undergone something of a critical re-appraisal and is generally hailed for being "a pretty good attempt at a moderately realistic "High Frontier" SF series".

Big Finish Productions announced in November 2017 that they would be releasing new Star Cops audio plays starring some of the surviving original cast members, beginning in 2018.

== Concept and setting ==
Spacemen are ten-a-penny. What they need out there is a good copper.

— The Commander, Star Cops, episode 1: "An Instinct for Murder", written by Chris Boucher

Star Cops is set in the year 2027—some 40 years into the future at time of broadcast—a time in which space travel has become common and mankind is in the process of exploiting and colonising the Solar System. There are five permanently occupied space stations orbiting the Earth and there are bases on the Moon and Mars. Approximately 3,000 people are living and working in space. This near future setting was influenced by the potential for greater access to space promised by the burgeoning Space Shuttle programme and by the militarisation of space through the US Government's Strategic Defense Initiative programme (also known as "Star Wars") both of which were underway in the early 1980s. Accordingly, space travel and life in space is portrayed in a realistic manner with depictions of weightlessness and low gravity environments and lengthy space journeys (months or years in cases of interplanetary travel) as well as hazards such as spacesuit failures, radiation exposure and explosive decompression. This air of realism has led to Star Cops being frequently compared with the 1973 BBC drama series Moonbase 3. Similarly, the pioneering spirit evoked by the process of colonising the Solar System seen in the series has led to comparisons with the Western genre among many commentators. The 'cops in space' genre had its origins six years earlier in the darker, R-rated 1981 film Outland.

Law and order is provided by the International Space Police Force (ISPF), twenty part-time volunteers disparagingly nicknamed the "Star Cops". The decision has been made to put the ISPF on a permanent full-time footing and a new commander, Nathan Spring, has been appointed to accomplish this. Many of the series episodes deal with Spring's efforts to establish the Star Cops—he sets up a base of operations on the Moonbase, recruits new staff, roots out and dismisses corrupt officers and works to extend the Star Cops' reach first into the American space stations and then, at the end of the series, the far-flung reaches of the Mars colonies, all the while investigating whatever crimes occur along the way.

Many of the crimes that the Star Cops investigate have a science fiction "twist" to them arising from the unconventional (for a police show) environment the series is set e.g. a murder in which the two victims are not yet dead, a ransom demand for kidnapped embryos, a hoax discovery of an alien civilisation, etc. It is out of these scenarios that one of the major themes of the series emerges: the conflict between human emotion and morality on the one hand and machine logic and rogue science on the other.

Another major theme of the series is the "sins of the father": Spring's first assignment as a detective was to arrest his father for industrial espionage, the villain in "Intelligent Listening for Beginners" is motivated by his inability to match his father's reputation, Spring's deputy, David Theroux, watched his father die of radiation poisoning, the kidnapper in "A Double Life" is seeking revenge for his father's murder and Star Cop Anna Shoun betrays the multinational company which employs her (and with whom she has a paternal relationship) when she discovers their unethical behaviour.

== Principal characters ==
The cast of Star Cops. Left to right: Jonathan Adams, Erick Ray Evans, Linda Newton, Trevor Cooper and David Calder

Nathan Spring (David Calder)
Nathan Spring is a 41-year-old Chief Superintendent in the British police force who reluctantly accepts promotion to Commander of the International Space Police Force with the brief of turning them into a full-time professional police force. Spring is a career policeman who has become disenchanted with the prevailing methods of policing which, he feels, are too dependent on computer logic and not on human instinct. His first job as a young detective was to arrest his own father, a computer salesman, for industrial espionage. Spring is a man who is driven but lonely, a man who doesn't make friends easily and whose ability to do so is not easy on account of his choice of career and work environment. His constant companion is Box, a prototype handheld computer (also voiced by Calder), bequeathed to him by his father. The conversations between Box and Spring provide insight into Spring's emotional state and thought processes as Spring engages in "almost Jacobean-style soliloquies" with the device.

David Theroux (Erick Ray Evans)
Spring's second in command is Chief Superintendent David Theroux, an African-American. Theroux, an engineer, started out in the US space program but quit and joined the European space effort instead. When he is introduced in the opening episode, "An Instinct for Murder", he is working as a traffic controller and part-time Star Cop on the European space station Charles de Gaulle. Movie buff Theroux generally tries to maintain an air of wise-cracking, cool detachment which breaks down only when he is forced in "This Case to be Opened in a Million Years" to face his morbid fear of radioactivity.

Colin Devis (Trevor Cooper)
When Spring's girlfriend, Lee Jones, is killed in "Conversations with the Dead", the task of investigating the murder is handed to Chief Inspector Colin Devis of the London Metropolitan Police, "one of the Department's all-time cretins". Devis' pursuit of the killer, an agent of the British Secret Service, costs him his job but Spring compensates him by hiring him, at the rank of Inspector, for the ISPF. Although Devis is not the sharpest investigator, his heart is in the right place and he is fiercely loyal to Spring. Overweight, sexist and bigoted, five times married Devis is the series' main comedy element and frequently gets the best lines.

Pal Kenzy (Linda Newton)
Australian Pal Kenzy is briefly glimpsed in "An Instinct for Murder" and then introduced properly in "Intelligent Listening for Beginners" where she is fired by Spring for corruption. Determined not to go quietly, Spring is forced to reinstate her when she foils an attempted hijacking on the Earth-Moon shuttle. She has a stormy relationship with Spring who mistrusts her but over the course of the series they develop a close bond. By the end of the series it is apparent that Spring has saved her from falling into a pit of corruption whereas she has restored his faith in humanity.

Anna Shoun (Sayo Inaba)
Rounding off the team is Dr Anna Shoun, a 29-year-old general physician from Japan. Spring takes her on when she is fired for betraying her employers, the multinational Hanimed corporation, to the Star Cops in the episode "In Warm Blood". The Shoun character has been criticised as a racial stereotype, a charge that has also been levelled at other aspects of the series such as depicting Italians as members of the Mafia, Arabs as Islamists and Americans as jingoistic warmongers.

Alexander Krivenko (Jonathan Adams)
Finally, introduced in "Trivial Games and Paranoid Pursuits", is Russian Alexander Krivenko, the commander of the Moonbase where the ISPF have their headquarters. A winner of the Nobel Prize for Medicine, it is Krivenko's research into bone damage that has contributed to enabling humanity to access space easily. Although the Star Cops are independent, Spring's relationship with Krivenko is often deferential and he frequently seems to capitulate to Krivenko's wishes.

== Production history ==
=== Origins ===
Chris Boucher began his television writing career in comedy, working on such programmes as Dave Allen at Large and Romany Jones, before moving on to write for drama series, including Shoestring, Juliet Bravo and Bergerac. He was no stranger to television science fiction, having written three serials for Doctor Who and having acted as script editor on the entire four season run of Blake's 7 as well as writing nine episodes for it himself. Boucher originally pitched Star Cops to the BBC in 1981 as a radio series but, with James Follet's epic Earthsearch serial in production that year, it was felt that science fiction was adequately served in the schedules and so Boucher tried to sell it to television instead. He sent the draft script of the first Star Cops story to Jonathan Powell, the Head of Drama at BBC television. Powell responded asking Boucher to write a second script and on the strength of this the series was commissioned. However, Powell insisted that the first story, which Boucher had intended to run over two episodes, be reworked into a single episode. This would be the first of many difficulties Boucher would have with how Star Cops was eventually realised for the screen. Boucher, who at this time was working as script editor on the crime series Bergerac, was also told by Powell he could work on Star Cops or on Bergerac but not on both and so chose to leave Bergerac.

=== Production ===
Assigned to produce Star Cops was Evgeny Gridneff, who had previously worked for the BBC on Tenko, Blott on the Landscape and Hold the Back Page. Gridneff and Boucher clashed over their respective visions for the series from the outset when, on their first meeting, Gridneff told Boucher that all his scripts would have to be rewritten. Boucher later remarked that their "relationship started out at the bottom and worked its way down".

Boucher had intended to write all ten scripts for the series himself but the tight timescale under which the episodes had to be recorded meant he could only contribute five, with the rest written by John Collee (three scripts) and Philip Martin (two scripts). Having previously qualified and worked as a doctor, Collee was a journalist who wrote for The Observer newspaper and later moved into films, most notably writing the screenplay for Master and Commander: The Far Side of the World. Martin was an experienced scriptwriter, best known for the controversial BBC drama series Gangsters, with previous experience in television science fiction, having written for Doctor Who. Two directors were assigned to the show: Christopher Baker, who had worked with Gridneff before on Hold the Back Page as well as BBC veterinarian dramas All Creatures Great and Small and One by One, and Graeme Harper who had directed two Doctor Who stories.

At the time, most British television drama was shot on a combination of film and videotape. Usually location shooting would be on film and studio work would be recorded on video. The effect of the change in medium from film to video (or vice versa) during a scene change in a programme could be jarring for some viewers. Boucher structured his scripts carefully so that all the Earth-based scenes would be shot on film on location and all the space scenes would be recorded on video in the studio hoping that the effect would give the space scenes a unique look. He was disappointed, therefore, to discover that Gridneff had decided to record the entire series on videotape.

Cast as Nathan Spring was David Calder, an experienced character actor with a reputation for "tough-guy" roles and best known at the time for his role as Detective Inspector George Resnick in the Lynda La Plante television serial Widows. Naming him Nathan after his youngest son, Boucher had originally written Spring as a much younger character, a high-flyer in his early thirties who had risen rapidly through the ranks of the police. Despite this Boucher was pleased with Calder's performance describing Calder as "a class act" whose "performance was immaculate". Trevor Cooper was cast as Colin Devis at the suggestion of Graeme Harper who had worked with him on Doctor Who and in theatre. The rest of the cast, with the exception of Jonathan Adams (who had a semi-regular role on Bergerac), were relatively unknown.

Given that the series was set in the relatively near future, Gridneff took great pains to ensure that the space scenes were depicted as accurately as possible, seeking advice from NASA and other space agencies as well as arranging a set visit by astronaut Pete Conrad, the third man to set foot on the Moon. Conrad's input proved useful in making the scenes set in weightlessness as convincing as the budget would allow. Assistance was also received from an aerospace manufacturer, the McDonnell Douglas Corporation, who provided stock footage of astronauts training in a water tank and received an on-screen credit on the first episode "An Instinct for Murder".

Recording of the series began on 12 August 1986 with the first block of episodes—"An Instinct for Murder", "Conversations with the Dead" and "Intelligent Listening for Beginners"—directed by Christopher Baker. This was followed by a block directed by Graeme Harper comprising "Trivial Games and Paranoid Pursuits", "This Case to be Opened in a Million Years" and "In Warm Blood". Christopher Baker then returned to the director's chair for "A Double Life" and "Other People's Secrets". Both directors had differing visions for the overall look and feel of the series, with the initial block directed by Baker favouring a pristine, brightly lit approach. This contrasted with the look preferred by Graeme Harper who drastically reduced the light levels (leaving many scenes illuminated only by computer monitor screens) and whose designer, Malcolm Thornton, dressed the sets in a messier and dingier fashion. When Baker returned for his second block of episodes, he sought to return to the brighter, cleaner look which led to some continuity problems. Meanwhile, Evgeny Gridneff and Chris Boucher's professional relationship continued to be stormy with Gridneff deciding to introduce a new Star Cop, Anna Shoun, without consulting Boucher. The cast and crew were well aware of the behind the scenes conflicts and David Calder later recalled that there was "uncertainty as to which direction this series should go in". Chris Boucher has been frequently critical of the way in which the series was realised and has since stated that, in retrospect, he wishes he had volunteered to produce the series himself. In response to Boucher's criticisms, Gridneff has said, "I respect him as a writer and he's professional and, you know, it's his series and if it didn't quite go the way he thought, you know, that's unfortunate when you're dealing, you know, you're losing your baby".

The final block was to be directed by Graeme Harper and would comprise the final two episodes "Death on the Moon", written by Philip Martin, and "Information Received", written by Chris Boucher. However industrial action at the BBC affected Star Cops and many other BBC programmes leaving a backlog of programmes once the strike had ended. Forced to prioritise and despite the fact that the episode had been cast, costumes made and sets constructed, the decision was taken to drop "Death on the Moon" and bring "Information Received", now titled "Little Green Men and Other Martians", forward. The three-day recording block for this episode began on 16 February 1987 just two days after recording of episode 8 had finished. Recording was further complicated when Erick Ray Evans fell ill and his lines had to split amongst the rest of the cast at the last minute with most of Theroux's dialogue going to Pal Kenzy. Production on Star Cops finally wrapped on 18 February 1987.

The theme song for the series, titled "It Won't be Easy", was written and performed by Justin Hayward, the lead vocalist with the Moody Blues. The theme was produced by record producer Tony Visconti who also composed, with Hayward, the incidental music for every episode. Gridneff hoped that the theme would act as a gentle method of enticing casual viewers into the series. Reaction to the music and Hayward's song in particular, has generally been negative. SFX magazine, in particular, has been highly critical of the theme tune: in one issue it was placed twenty-ninth in a list article titled "The 50 Worst Things About SF Ever!" while in another it was placed sixth in a list article titled "The 10 Worst Things About UK Telefantasy". Writer and critic Kim Newman has described the theme as the "worst single theme tune of any TV show ever". Chris Boucher has said that he "hated the music. The incidental music wasn't appropriate and it didn't have the style and feeling it should have had".

=== Transmission and viewer reaction ===
Star Cops was broadcast on Monday nights at around 8:30 pm starting on 6 July 1987 on BBC2. Competition was provided on BBC One by sitcom Terry and June and The Nine O'Clock News. The fifth episode, "This Case to be Opened in a Million Years", was broadcast at the later time of 9:55 pm. The BBC listings magazine Radio Times promoted the series, giving it the front cover of the 4–10 July 1987 edition accompanied by a four-page article by Johnny Black inside. Star Cops performed poorly in the ratings with an average audience across the series of only 2.2 million viewers. Chris Boucher has blamed the poor ratings on the timeslot the show was given, stating: "There is nothing that has ever gone out on BBC 2 at half-past eight until twenty-past nine; it's a grotesque period. It doesn't synch with anything on BBC 1; it just doesn't work in relation to anything. You had to badly want to see Star Cops in order to watch it because you had to sacrifice at least two hours of viewing to see it. I can see why people didn't want to have that problem.". He has also commented that the poor timeslot and the decision to air the series in July and August (a time when viewing figures are traditionally lower due to the summer) reflected the fact that Star Cops didn't have the confidence of the BBC management. This view is echoed by star David Calder who has described the timeslot as "an act of sabotage and absurdity".

Critical reaction to the show was generally negative: writing in The Times following the broadcast of "Conversations with the Dead", Andrew Hislop wrote that "Star Cops has neither the campiness of Star Trek nor the imagination of Dr. Who to overcome its technological limitations". Also in The Times, reviewing "Intelligent Listening for Beginners", Martin Cropper found that "some of the individual plot-lines show invention of a sort, but the script is uniformly feeble". Meanwhile, in The Sunday Times, Patrick Stoddart was confused by the plot of "This Case to be Opened in a Million Years" asking readers "if you are following any of this, please write to me and explain". Letter writers to the Radio Times were split on the merits of the show: some such as P. Tricker of Alpheton, Suffolk praising it for having "brilliant special effects, well-written scripts and actors who were convincing" while others like Martin Bower of Allendale, Northumberland slated the "dated designs, poor music [and] cheap sets" and P. Curwen of Balloch, Dunbartonshire described it as "boring – too much talk and not enough action". Science fiction fandom at the time was more positive with Anthony McKay in Time Screen describing the series as "one of the most refreshing telefantasy series for years" while the British Science Fiction Association gave the show their Media Award in 1987. The Encyclopedia of Science Fiction stated, "the low-key realism of the show was efficient enough" but argued, in the end, that Star Cops "failed to imagine the future with any real vividness or depth". The low ratings doomed the show to a single season and, although admired, it has never developed a significant following among science fiction aficionados. Boucher has stated that, in retrospect, he feels that the series was too outlandish for crime drama fans and not outlandish enough for science fiction fans and that ultimately it appealed to neither.

=== Proposals for a second season ===
When recording was completed, Gridneff asked Boucher if he had any ideas for a further season of Star Cops. Boucher felt that were the series to continue he would like to extend the setting further out into the Solar System, visiting the Mars colonies and the Big Ring space colonies under construction. He intended to achieve this either by transferring one of the existing regular characters to the Mars colony or by introducing a new regular who would be based there. The second season was never developed beyond these few basic notions as it was clear to Boucher from an early stage that there was little prospect of the series being renewed. Following Star Cops, Boucher went on to work as script editor on the long-running ITV police drama The Bill before returning to freelance writing while Gridneff moved on to work on the BBC drama series The House of Eliott.

== Legacy ==
The demise of Star Cops after just nine episodes has been seen as indicative of the decline of British television science fiction in the 1980s and, after Doctor Who followed Star Cops into cancellation in 1989, there would be no British regular science fiction drama series on British television until Bugs began in 1995. However, Star Cops has undergone something of a reappraisal – in science fiction circles at least – since it went off the air in 1987. Reviewing the VHS releases for TV Zone in 1991, Gary Russell stated that "Star Cops represents excellent science fiction" and recanted his original impression of the series upon broadcast that it was "Bergerac in spacesuits, complete with rather cruddy visual effects and boring performances". A retrospective article written by Keith Topping for Dreamwatch to mark the series' 10th anniversary in 1997 described Star Cops as "a series that could (and should) have been one of the BBC's most popular, influential and entertaining products of the era. On at least one of these points the series failed miserably, but, certainly when it came to entertainment, it succeeded magnificently". In 1999, when science fiction magazine SFX asked an expert panel from the SF field, including Terry Pratchett and Stephen Baxter, to compile a list of the top 50 SF shows of all time, Star Cops came thirteenth on the list, with SFX describing it as "the SF TV show SF writers love. It wasn't perfect but it's as close as TV will ever get to producing proper written SF". Later, in 2005, SFX went on to poll its readers for their list of the top 50 British telefantasy shows and Star Cops was voted into twenty-seventh position on the list. The BBC themselves revisited Star Cops in a thirty-minute retrospective documentary about the show, recorded as part of a series titled The Cult of..., first broadcast on BBC Four on 28 November 2006 as part of that channel's Science Fiction Britannia season. Reflecting on the show in the programme, the author and critic Kim Newman said that "the strength of Star Cops is the writing. I don't think any of the episodes are realised as well on screen as they are on the page. [...] If it had come back for another couple of seasons it might well have been the BBC's best science fiction show". The documentary concluded that Star Cops was an "overlooked gem".

== Episode guide ==
Star Cops comprised nine episodes and was first broadcast on Monday nights on BBC2 between 6 July 1987 and 31 August 1987. A tenth episode "Death on the Moon" was planned but abandoned following industrial action at the BBC.

Ep. No.	Title	Writer	Director	Airdate	Airtime	Duration	Audience (millions)
1	"An Instinct for Murder"	Chris Boucher	Christopher Baker	6 July 1987	8:30 pm	51:26	2.8m
1	Plot: Reluctantly reassigned from a case involving a mysterious drowning, Chief Inspector Nathan Spring, shortlisted for the post of Commander of the International Space Police Force, the "Star Cops", becomes embroiled in the investigation of a series of unexplained spacesuit failures on the space station Charles de Gaulle. Notes: This episode introduces Nathan Spring, David Theroux, Pal Kenzy and Box. Guest Stars: Moray Watson (as The Commander), Keith Varneier (as Stephenson, Controller), Gennie Nevinson (as Lee Jones), Andy Secombe (as Brian Lincoln), Luke Hanson (as Lars Hendvorrsen).						
2	"Conversations with the Dead"	Chris Boucher	Christopher Baker	13 July 1987	8:35 pm	51:26	3.2m
2	Plot: Spring's life is thrown into turmoil when his girlfriend, Lee Jones, is brutally murdered. Warned off the case by investigating officer Colin Devis, Spring becomes entangled in the murky world of international espionage. Elsewhere, charged with setting up the Star Cops headquarters on the Moon, Theroux investigates an explosion on a distant space freighter that has knocked the craft off course and condemned its two pilots to death. Notes: This episode introduces Colin Devis. Guest Stars: Gennie Nevinson (as Lee Jones), Sian Webber (as Corman), Alan Downer (as Paton), Sean Scanlan (as Fox), Carmen Gómez (as Gina Succini), Deborah Manship (as Traffic Controller), Richard Ireson (as voice of Mike).						
3	"Intelligent Listening for Beginners"	Chris Boucher	Christopher Baker	20 July 1987	8:30 pm	48:19	2.6m
3	Plot: Spring fires two Star Cops, Pal Kenzy and Kirk Hubble, for corruption. A terrorist organisation, the Black Hand Gang, has attacked a chemical plant and the Channel Tunnel using a computer worm. The Star Cops are warned of further attacks by a communications expert engaged in secret research on an outpost on the Moon. Guest Stars: Trevor Butler (as Leo), David John Pope (as Michael Chandri), Tara Ward (as Shuttle Hostess).						
4	"Trivial Games and Paranoid Pursuits"	Chris Boucher	Graeme Harper	27 July 1987	8:30 pm	51:45	2.5m
4	Plot: As Spring attempts to persuade the sceptical Americans to allow him to open a Star Cops office on their space station, the Ronald Reagan, he is asked to investigate the disappearance of a scientist Dr Harvey Goodman from the Ronald Reagan station. The station personnel deny that Goodman or the section of the station he worked in – OMZ13 – ever existed. Out near the Sun, a salvage ship finds an abandoned capsule, designated OMZ13, floating in space... Notes: This episode introduces Alexander Krivenko. Guest Stars: Daniel Benzali (as Commander Griffin), Marlena Mackey (as Dilly Goodman), Robert Jezek (as Pete Lennox), Morgan Deare (as Harvey Goodman).						
5	"This Case to be Opened in a Million Years"	Philip Martin	Graeme Harper	3 August 1987	9:55 pm	51:19	1.4m
5	Plot: While Theroux is left to investigate the crash of a rocket carrying nuclear waste, Spring, on an enforced vacation, is lured to Rome where he is framed for drug-trafficking. Notes: Philip Martin's original script envisaged that Spring would visit a sunken Venice by submarine for his holiday. Budgetary limitations meant that this was changed to Rome. However, the script retains a brief reference to Venice as having sunk beneath the waves. Guest Stars: Vikki Chambers (as Lina Margello), Andre Winterton (as Pordenne), Carl Forgione (as Tour Guide).						
6	"In Warm Blood"	John Collee	Graeme Harper	10 August 1987	8:35 pm	51:46	2.2m
6	Plot: The returning crew of the survey ship Pluto 5 are discovered dead, appearing almost freeze-dried. All with a connection to a large Japanese corporation and the suicide of a scientist close to the Moonbase commander. Notes: This episode introduces Anna Shoun to the team. The working title for the story was "Trial by Murder". Guest Stars: Dawn Keeler (as Christina Janssen), Richard Rees (as Richard Ho), Susan Tan (as Receptionist).						
7	"A Double Life"	John Collee	Christopher Baker	17 August 1987	8:35 pm	51:41	2.1m
7	Plot: Mystery surrounds a world-famous pianist accused of kidnapping and ransoming embryos from Moonbase. Anna Shoun and Colin Devis investigate and ultimately confront what turns out to be the clone of the accused pianist. Guest Stars: Brian Gwaspari (as James Bannerman / Albi), Nitza Saul (as Chamsya Assadi).						
8	"Other People's Secrets"	John Collee	Christopher Baker	24 August 1987	8:35 pm	51:43	1.8m
8	Plot: Ever increasing glitches and equipment failures around the Moonbase coincide with a safety inspection and lead eventually to a decompression emergency for the base. During the emergency Nathan Spring and Pal Kenzy are forced to spend time together, as does Colin Devis with his psychologist ex-wife. Guest Stars: Geoffrey Bayldon (as Ernest Wolfhartt), Leigh Funnell (as Beverley Anderson), Maggie Ollerenshaw (as Dr. Angela Parr), Barrie Rutter (as Hooper).						
9	"Little Green Men and Other Martians"	Chris Boucher	Graeme Harper	31 August 1987	8:35 pm	51:11	1.2m
9	Plot: Rumours swell of alien artefacts discovered on Mars. An attempt is made to kill Nathan Spring as he investigates drug smuggling and the deaths of two pilots. The episode and the series ends with the question "Anyone for Mars?". Notes: The working title for this story was "Information Received". Due to illness, Erick Ray Evans was unable to appear as David Theroux. Guest Stars: Lachele Carl (as Susan Caxton), Roy Holder (as Daniel Larwood), Bridget Lynch-Blosse (as Co-pilot).						
Unmade Episode
Ep. No.	Title	Writer	Director	Airdate	Airtime	Duration	Audience (millions)
n/a	"Death on the Moon"	Philip Martin	Graeme Harper	n/a	n/a	n/a	n/a
n/a	Plot: This episode would have been a country house murder mystery – of the sort popularised by the fiction of Agatha Christie and the board game Cluedo – set on the Moon. It would have centred around a plan by a Chinese corporation – Chinex – to launch raw materials from the Moon to the Lagrangian point between the Moon and the Earth where they would be used to construct a space city. The Star Cops are called in to investigate when one of the engineers is found dead during the opening of the project. Spring assigns one Star Cop to each of the five possible suspects. As each suspect is killed off, Spring realises that the project is a con and exposes the killer – a flamboyant Swiss industrialist – via a satellite link during a shareholder's meeting. Notes: Cancelled due to industrial action at the BBC, this episode was intended as the penultimate Star Cops story set between "Other People's Secrets" and "Little Green Men and Other Martians". Although it had reached rehearsal stage by the time it was cancelled, the cast list for this episode remains unknown. Andy Secombe has said that he was to have reprised his character from the first episode "An Instinct for Murder" in this episode.						

== Audio series ==
On 9 November 2017, Big Finish Productions announced they would be releasing a new series of Star Cops stories as audio plays, with surviving original cast members David Calder, Trevor Cooper and Linda Newton reprising their roles as Nathan Spring, Colin Devis and Pal Kenzy respectively. Joining them were Rakhee Thakrar as Priya Basu and Philip Olivier as Paul Bailey. Nimmy March also played Commander Shayla Moss, the new appointed co-ordinator of the Moonbase.

Two box sets of four adventures were announced, and released in May and December 2018 under the banner title of Mother Earth.

A further series, entitled Star Cops: Mars was announced on 1 November 2019, starring the core cast of Calder, Cooper and Newton. Two volumes, each containing three episodes were released in December 2019 and July 2020.

Additionally, an audiobook novel The Stuff of Life, written by Mike Tucker and narrated by Trevor Cooper, was released in December 2019. It was set between the events of Mother Earth and Mars. A second audiobook entitled Sins of the Father, also by Tucker and again narrated by Trevor Cooper was released in December 2021. This story is set directly after the events of the Mars series.

Further series announced were The High Frontier in 2022, Blood Moon in 2023 and Conflict in 2025.

=== Mother Earth ===
No.	Title	Directed by	Written by	Released
Part 1
1.1	"One of Our Cops is Missing"	Helen Goldwyn	Andrew Smith	May 2018
1.2	"Tranquility and Other Illusions"	Helen Goldwyn	Ian Porter	May 2018
1.3	"Lockdown"	Helen Goldwyn	Christopher Hatherall	May 2018
1.4	"The Thousand Ton Bomb"	Helen Goldwyn	Guy Adams	May 2018
Part 2
1.5	"Dead and Buried"	Helen Goldwyn	Guy Adams	December 2018
1.6	"The Killing Jar"	Helen Goldwyn	John Dorney	December 2018
1.7	"Moonshine"	Helen Goldwyn	Roland Moore	December 2018
1.8	"Hostage"	Helen Goldwyn	Andrew Smith	December 2018

=== The Stuff of Life (audiobook) ===
No.	Title	Directed by	Written by	Released
2.0	"The Stuff of Life"	-	Mike Tucker	December 2019

=== Mars ===
No.	Title	Directed by	Written by	Released
Part 1
2.1	"The New World"	Helen Goldwyn	Andrew Smith	December 2019
2.2	"The Shadow of this Red Rock"	Helen Goldwyn	Una McCormack	December 2019
2.3	"Whatever Happened to Gary Rice?"	Helen Goldwyn	Guy Adams	December 2019
Part 2
2.4	"Bodies of Evidence"	Helen Goldwyn	Andrew Smith	July 2020
2.5	"Human Kind"	Helen Goldwyn	Helen Goldwyn	July 2020
2.6	"The Highest Ground"	Helen Goldwyn	Andrew Smith	July 2020

=== Sins of the Father (audiobook) ===
No.	Title	Directed by	Written by	Released
3.0	"Sins of the Father"	-	Mike Tucker	December 2021

=== The High Frontier ===
No.	Title	Directed by	Written by	Released
Part 1
3.1	"Dead Air"	Helen Goldwyn	Roland Moore	October 2022
3.2	"Hostile Takeover"	Helen Goldwyn	Rossa McPhillips	October 2022
3.3	"Death in the Desert"	Helen Goldwyn	Sarah Grochala	October 2022
Part 2
3.4	"Old Flame, New Fire"	Helen Goldwyn	Alison Winter	April 2023
3.5	"Grandma’s Footsteps"	Helen Goldwyn	Katharine Armitage	April 2023
3.6	"Escape and Evasion"	Helen Goldwyn	Andrew Smith	April 2023

=== Blood Moon ===
No.	Title	Directed by	Written by	Released
Part 1
4.1	"I Was Killed Yesterday"	Helen Goldwyn	Andrew Smith	January 2024
4.2	"Daughters of Death"	Helen Goldwyn	Nicola Baldwin	February 2024
4.3	"Troubled Waters"	Helen Goldwyn	Una McCormack	March 2024
Part 2
4.4	"A Cage of Sky"	Helen Goldwyn	James Swallow	April 2024
4.5	"London Zone"	Helen Goldwyn	Andrew Smith	May 2024
4.6	"Devis"	Helen Goldwyn	Roland Moore	June 2024

=== Conflict ===
No.	Title	Directed by	Written by	Released
Part 1
5.1	"Suspicion and Sabotage"	Helen Goldwyn	Andrew Smith	January 2026
5.2	"Shadow of the Moonlight"	Helen Goldwyn	Mark Wright	February 2026
5.3	"Prisoner and Escort"	Helen Goldwyn	Roland Moore	March 2026

== Merchandising ==
A very small amount of merchandising has been produced for Star Cops. To coincide with the broadcast of the series in 1987, BBC Enterprises released Justin Hayward's theme song "It Won't Be Easy" as a 7-inch and 12-inch single. The 7-inch included the track "Outer Space" by Hayward and Tony Visconti, which was one of the incidental music tracks written for "An Instinct for Murder", on the B-side. The 12-inch had an extended version of "It Won't Be Easy" on the A-side and the 7-inch version of "It Won't Be Easy" and "Outer Space" on the B-side. "It Won't Be Easy" was later released on compact disc as part of the compilation The Best of BBC TV's Themes.

The entire series was released by BBC Video in three volumes, each containing three episodes, on VHS video tape in 1991. Some purchasers of the VHS tapes also received embroidered ISPF and Moonbase patches made by Stewart Aviation, which were also available separately.

Chris Boucher novelised his five Star Cops scripts and they were semi-professionally published in two volumes by Judith Proctor. The first volume An Instinct for Murder was adapted from the first Star Cops episode of the same name. The second volume Little Green Men and Other Stories included the four remaining Boucher scripts. There are some changes from the broadcast episodes – the characters of Alexander Krivenko and Anna Shoun do not appear in these books. Krivenko is replaced by a Chinese character, Jiang Li Ho, as an attempt to update the Star Cops universe to reflect the ending of the Cold War in 1989. Shoun is replaced by an Irish character, Dana Cogill – Boucher did not own the rights to use the Shoun character which had been created by John Collee. The two volumes were combined into a single book or eBook, published by What Noise Productions in May 2013, and available through Amazon and Bandcamp.

The complete series was released on DVD by Network Video in a single, three-disc volume in 2004. This release contained a number of extras including commentaries by Boucher on "An Instinct for Murder" and "Little Green Men and Other Martians" and by Philip Martin on "This Case to be Opened in a Million Years" as well as a making-of documentary, interviews with Boucher, Martin and Trevor Cooper, and behind-the-scenes footage.

A book entitled Above the Law: The Unofficial Guide to Star Cops, written by Paul Watts, was published in August 2020 by Miwk Publishing. It chronicles the series from concept to screen, as well as audio, and features over thirty interviews with the cast and crew.
