= Sweet Liberty =

1986 film by Alan Alda

- Theatrical release poster
- Directed by: Alan Alda
- Written by: Alan Alda
- Produced by: Martin Bregman
- Starring: Alan Alda; Michael Caine; Michelle Pfeiffer; Bob Hoskins; Lise Hilboldt; Lillian Gish
- Cinematography: Frank Tidy
- Edited by: Michael Economou
- Music by: Bruce Broughton
- Distributed by: Universal Pictures
- Release date: May 16, 1986
- Running time: 106 minutes
- Country: United States
- Language: English
- Box office: $14.2 million

Sweet Liberty is a 1986 American comedy film written and directed by Alan Alda, and starring Alda in the lead role, alongside Michael Caine and Michelle Pfeiffer, with support from Bob Hoskins, Lois Chiles, Lise Hilboldt, Lillian Gish, Larry Shue and Saul Rubinek.

The story was partly inspired by Alda's experiences while caring for his parents who had both been ill and were in two different hospitals. During a visit to see his dying father, a nurse approached him with a head shot and résumé. In an interview prior to the film's UK release he said, "It was the worst year of my life and I thought this is so miserable there must be a funny movie in it!".

Sweet Liberty featured the penultimate film appearance of Lillian Gish, who made her screen debut 74 years earlier in 1912.

== Plot ==
College history professor Michael Burgess (Alan Alda) is about to have his fact-based historical novel about the American Revolution turned into a Hollywood motion picture. Set to star the egotistical lothario Elliott James (Michael Caine) (who is portraying Banastre Tarleton in the film) and the seemingly sweet Method actress Faith Healy (Michelle Pfeiffer), the production will be filmed in the fictional small college town of Sayeville, North Carolina, where Burgess teaches.

Michael's excitement is squelched by his increasing exasperation as the novel is changed by a low-brow scriptwriter (Bob Hoskins) and a condescending director (Saul Rubinek) into a steamy tale of lust and betrayal, complete with nudity and distortions of historical fact.

While Michael navigates on-set politics, he is distracted by his mother Cecilia (Lillian Gish) and her delusions, including the belief that she is being poisoned and that the Devil lives in her kitchen. He has been trying unsuccessfully to convince his girlfriend Gretchen (Lise Hilboldt) to move in with him. He falls for Faith and begins an affair with her, believing her to be like the character she is portraying in the film.

When Gretchen finds out, she begins welcoming the advances of Elliott James. The married actor is not only flirting with Gretchen but also pursuing the college president's wife, Leslie (Lois Chiles). He humiliates Michael repeatedly in bouts of fencing. Elliott's wife (Linda Thorson) arrives on the set, complicating matters further.

Michael becomes disillusioned when he realizes that Faith is not at all like her film character, and he is disgusted by the Hollywood process. When extras from a local Revolutionary War reenactor company are bullied and mocked by the film crew, Michael persuades them to turn the tables on their tormentors. He deliberately sabotages the historically inaccurate film by injecting a little accuracy and a lot of chaos.

The locals use explosives during a horribly inaccurate recreation of the Battle of Cowpens and destroy a prop building before the director is ready with the shot. Michael, who had previously been lectured by the arrogant director that audiences want defiance of authority, destruction of property and nudity, reveals how he has undermined the production. He tells the extras to celebrate the battle by dancing naked before the camera.

By the time of the film's premiere in town, the Hollywood people are long gone and Michael and Gretchen are back together. They arrive to the screening with Gretchen very much pregnant. Michael can only respond with a strained look when he is asked by a Hollywood reporter how it feels "to see history come alive".

== Cast ==
- Alan Alda as Michael Burgess
- Michael Caine as Elliott James
- Michelle Pfeiffer as Faith Healy
- Bob Hoskins as Stanley Gould
- Lise Hilboldt as Gretchen Carlsen
- Lillian Gish as Cecelia Burgess
- Saul Rubinek as Bo Hodges
- Lois Chiles as Leslie
- Lynne Thigpen as Claire
- Timothy Carhart as Eagleton, Stunt Coordinator
- Linda Thorson as Grace James

== Reception ==
=== Box office ===
Released on May 16, 1986, Sweet Liberty was the 3rd highest-grossing movie of its debut week, behind Top Gun, also released that week, and Short Circuit. It stayed in the box office Top 10 for five weeks, steadily moved down by new entrants such as Cobra, Back to School, and Ferris Bueller's Day Off. Ultimately Sweet Liberty earned $14,285,000, ranking as the 64th highest-grossing movie of the year.

=== Critical response ===
Sweet Liberty has a rating of 76% on Rotten Tomatoes, based on 17 critics' reviews.

The consensus of critics was that the film lacked the satirical bite that might have been expected from a story about the Hollywood film industry. Vincent Canby in the New York Times called it a "mildly satiric comedy so toothless it wouldn't even offend a mogul as sensitive and publicly pious as Louis B. Mayer", and sympathised with the actors as "severely limited by material that doesn't go anywhere".

Time Out described the film as "nearly as dull as it sounds, intermittently enlivened only by Hoskins and Caine, the latter effortlessly amusing as the production's leading man". Variety wrote that "comedic potential is too rarely realized". Roger Ebert in the Chicago Sun-Times thought the film tried to "juggle a lot of characters all at once" and lamented that there was "more material than there was time to deal with it".

The majority of critical praise was reserved for the lead actors. Michael Caine was described variously as an "excellent comic actor", "the kind of charming cad you can never really hate for too long", and "such an accomplished actor that all he has to do is behave with self-assured grace". Pfeiffer was acclaimed for "wonderfully subtle touches", and was described as getting "a chance to show that she has the potential to be a first-rate comedienne", and as the actress who "neatly tucks the movie into her bodice and saunters off with it".
