= Festival (British TV series) =

British television drama anthology series (1960–1969)

Festival is an hour-long British dramatic anthology series produced by the British Broadcasting Corporation and aired on the BBC from 1960 to 1969. There were a total of 148 plays, adapted from writers ranging from William Shakespeare to Samuel Beckett. Titles include Krapp's Last Tape by Beckett, Comedy of Errors by Shakespeare, Lysistrata by Aristophanes, Under Milk Wood by Dylan Thomas, Murder in the Cathedral by T.S. Eliot, and Six Characters in Search of an Author by Luigi Pirandello.

== Cast ==
- David Garfield as Organ Morgan, Dai, Alvin
- Cyril Cusack as Krapp, Thomas Becket, Father
- John Wood as Laevsky, Robert Emmet, The Speaker
- John Welsh as Aegeon, a merchant of Syracuse, General
- Marie Kean as Dante, Flower Woman
- Ann Bell as Katonike, Good-Deeds
- June Tobin as Leader of Chorus, Molly Bloom
- Audrey Richards as Captain Cat, Russell
- John Le Mesurier as de Giray, Don Bernal de la Encina
- Eric Thompson as Borghejm, Prisoner
- Peter Sallis as Captain of the Fire Brigade, Romainville
- Kate Binchy as Nun, Boeotian Girl

=== Guest stars ===
included Judi Dench, Diane Cilento, Diana Rigg, Ian Richardson, Lee Grant, Milo O'Shea, Peter Wyngarde, and Margaret Whiting.
