= The Way We Live Now (1969 TV serial) =

The Way We Live Now is an adaptation of the 1875 novel The Way We Live Now by Anthony Trollope as a five-part serial for television. Adapted by Simon Raven and directed by James Cellan Jones, it was first broadcast in weekly episodes each Saturday evening on BBC Two, from 5 April to 3 May 1969.

== Partial cast ==
- Colin Blakely - Augustus Melmotte
- Rachel Gurney - Lady Carbury
- Sharon Gurney - Henrietta Carbury
- Cavan Kendall - Sir Felix Carbury
- Irene Prador - Madame Melmotte
- Angharad Rees - Marie Melmotte
- Sarah Brackett - Mrs Hurtle
