= Lisa Harrow =

New Zealand actress (born 1943)

Lisa Harrow ONZM
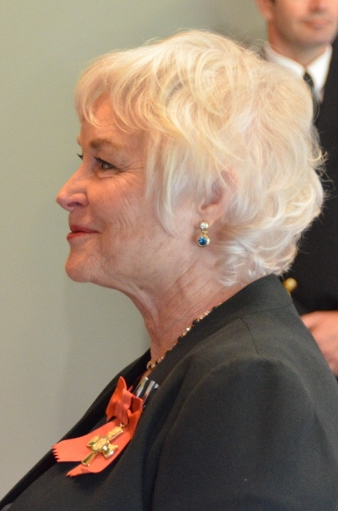
- Harrow in 2015
- Born: 25 August 1943 (age 83); Auckland, New Zealand
- Education: Royal Academy of Dramatic Art (1968)
- Occupation: Actress
- Spouse: Roger Payne (m. 1991; died 2023)
- Children: 1

Lisa Harrow ONZM (born 25 August 1943) is a New Zealand, RADA-trained actress, noted for her roles in British theatre, films and television. She is perhaps best known for her portrayal of Nancy Astor in the British BBC television drama Nancy Astor.

== Early life ==
Harrow was born in the Auckland suburb of Mount Eden on 25 August 1943, the daughter of Kennedy Mayo Harrow and Eleanor Joan Harrow (née Stacpoole). She studied at the University of Auckland, and later graduated from RADA in 1968, joining the BBC Radio Repertory Company.

== Acting career ==
=== Theatre ===
Harrow's stage career started at the Royal Shakespeare Company; roles there included Olivia in John Barton's production of Twelfth Night opposite Judi Dench, and Portia in The Merchant of Venice opposite Patrick Stewart. Other leading roles in the UK theatre include Juliet opposite John Hurt's Romeo at the Belgrade Theatre in Coventry, and Ann Whitfield in Man and Superman opposite Peter O'Toole at the Theatre Royal, Haymarket.

Harrow has performed on stage all over America. She took over the central role of Vivian Bearing in the Pulitzer Prize winning play Wit in its long-running off-Broadway production in New York City. She was named 2001 Performer of the Year in Pittsburgh for Medea. Other roles include: Raynevskya in The Cherry Orchard at Yale Rep and the Chautauqua Theatre Company, where she also played Kate Keller in All My Sons. She played Creusa in the Washington Shakespeare Theatre Company's 3 October 2009–4/12/2009 production of Euripides's Ion.

=== Television and film ===
Harrow is known for playing Nancy Astor, the first woman to take her seat in the House of Commons, in the 1982 BBC drama Nancy Astor. It aired in the United States in the PBS series Masterpiece Theatre.

Her first film role was in the Italian film The Devil Is a Woman (1974) starring Glenda Jackson. Also in 1976, she featured in an episode of Space: 1999 as Anna Davies in 'The Testament of Arkadia'. Harrow played Helen Alderson in the film adaptation of James Herriot's book All Creatures Great and Small (1975), starring alongside Simon Ward and Anthony Hopkins. She reprised the role the following year in the sequel It Shouldn't Happen to a Vet, this time opposite John Alderton and Colin Blakely.

Harrow guest-starred in The Professionals as a counsel arguing at a Court of Inquiry for the disbandment of CI5 in the second-season episode 'The Rack' (1978), written by Brian Clemens. She also starred in the BBC2 series 1990 as Deputy Controller Lynn Blake.

Harrow played journalist Kate Reynolds in the horror film Omen III: The Final Conflict (1981) starring Sam Neill, and worked with Neill again in Krzysztof Zanussi's film From a Far Country. She starred in the New Zealand film Shaker Run in 1985, and played Lizzie Dickinson in the BBC series Lizzie's Pictures (1987). She won the Australian Film Institute Award for Best Actress in a Leading Role for her performance in The Last Days of Chez Nous (1992). In 1990, Harrow played the tart-tongued, ignored wife in a cunning family of rich brewers in Sins of the Father, Series 4 Episode 3 of the Inspector Morse series for ITV, starring John Thaw. That year, she also starred in the ABC-TV miniseries adaptation of Come In Spinner, and played the role of Imogen Donahue in Agatha Christie's Poirot 'The Kidnapped Prime Minister'. Her later television performances in Britain was as Kavanagh's wife Lizzie in the series Kavanagh QC, also starring Thaw. She left the programme after the third series (transmitted in 1997) to move to America.

In 2014, she played Marion in the New Zealand television series Step Dave.

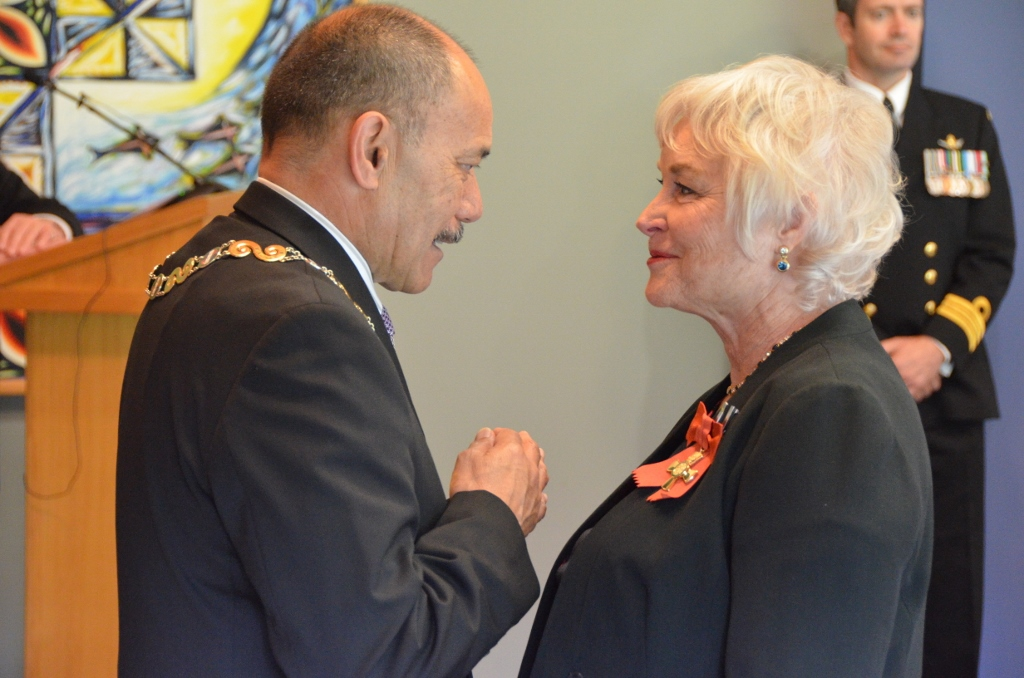
Harrow in 2015, at her investiture as an Officer of the New Zealand Order of Merit by the governor-general, Sir Jerry Mateparae

In the 2015 New Year Honours, Harrow was appointed an Officer of the New Zealand Order of Merit for services to the dramatic arts.

== Author ==
Harrow is the author of the environmental handbook What Can I Do?, published in separate editions for Australia, New Zealand, the UK and the United States.

== Personal life ==
Harrow was in a long term relationship with Sam Neill, who she appeared with in Omen III: The Final Conflict (1981) and the two have a son together. In 2023, Neill stated that his relationship with Harrow lasted for 11 years.

She was married to whale biologist Roger Payne (died 10 June 2023), and lived in Vermont, US. Payne was founder and president of Ocean Alliance.

== Publications ==
- Harrow, Lisa (2004). What can I do? : an alphabet for living. White River Junction, Vermont: Chelsea Green. ISBN 1-931498-66-0. LCCN 2004016720. (pbk. : alk. paper) Includes bibliographical references.

== Honours ==
In the 2015 New Year Honours, Harrow was appointed an Officer of the New Zealand Order of Merit, for services to the dramatic arts.

== Filmography ==
- The Devil Is a Woman (1974) as Emilia Contreas
- Space: 1999 - Episode : 'The Testament of Arkadia' (1975 – TV) as Anna Davis
- All Creatures Great and Small (1975 – TV) as Helen
- It Shouldn't Happen to a Vet (1976) as Helen
- Star Maidens (1976 – TV) as Dr Liz Becker
- 1990 (1978 – TV) as Lynn Blake
- The Look (1978 – TV) as Sonny
- Dr. Jekyll and Mr. Hyde (1980 – TV) as Ann Coggeshall
- Omen III: The Final Conflict (1981) as Kate Reynolds
- From a Far Country (1981) as Wanda
- Nancy Astor (1982 – TV) as Nancy Astor
- Man and Superman (1982 – TV) as Ann Whitefield
- Under Capricorn (1983)
- Other Halves (1984) as Liz
- Shaker Run (1985) as Dr. Christine Rubin
- Lizzie's Pictures (1987 – TV) as Lizzie Dickinson
- Act of Betrayal (1988 – TV) as Eileen McGurk
- Always Afternoon (1988 – TV) as Nancy Kennon
- Nonni and Manni (1988–89 – TV) as Sigrid Jónsdóttir
- Come In Spinner (1990 – TV) as Claire Jeffries
- Inspector Morse: 'The Sins of the Fathers' (1990 – TV) as Thelma Radford
- The Last Days of Chez Nous (1992) as Beth
- Agatha Christie's Poirot: 'The Kidnapped Prime Minister' (1990) as Mrs. Daniels
- That Eye, the Sky (1994) as Alice Flack
- Kavanagh QC (1995–97 – TV) as Lizzie Kavanagh
- Sunday (1997) as Madeleine Vesey
- Country (2000) as Miriam
- Jessica (2004 – TV) as Hester Bergman
- Red Knot (2014) as Lisa Harrow
- Step Dave (2014 – TV) as Marion Gray
- Henry (2017) as Joanna
- The Brokenwood Mysteries: 'Exposed To The Light' (2021 – TV) as Charlotte Chambers
- Blind Bitter Happiness Pilot (2021 – TV) as Grandma Magsie
- Destination Love (2021 – TV) as Katherine
