= Richard Stolley =

American journalist and magazine editor (1928–2021)

- Born: Richard Brockway Stolley; October 3, 1928; Pekin, Illinois, U.S.
- Died: June 16, 2021 (aged 92); Evanston, Illinois, U.S.
- Education: Northwestern University
- Known for: Founding editor of People
- Spouses: Anne Shawber (divorced) Lise Hilboldt (divorced)
- Children: 4

Richard Brockway Stolley (October 3, 1928 – June 16, 2021) was an American journalist and magazine editor. He is noted as the founding managing editor of People magazine and for acquiring the Zapruder film for Life magazine in 1963.

Stolley began his career with Life in 1953. He subsequently held a number of roles at the magazine, including reporter, bureau chief, senior editor, and assistant managing editor. He became the inaugural editor of People when it was launched in 1974. During his eight years at the publication, it became the most profitable magazine in the country. He returned to Life in 1982 and eventually became editorial director across all Time Inc. magazines. He continued working for the company until his retirement in 2014.

== Early life ==
Stolley was born in Pekin, Illinois, on October 3, 1928. His father worked as a factory manager; his mother was employed as an English teacher. During high school, Stolley served as the editor of his school paper, as well as sports editor for his hometown newspaper, The Pekin Daily Times. He subsequently joined the United States Navy before studying at Northwestern University. He graduated with a bachelor's degree in 1952, before obtaining a master's degree in journalism the following year.

== Career ==
Stolley first worked for Life magazine, which he joined the same year after graduating. He soon gained recognition as "one of the magazine’s best young editorial managers". He was an editor at Life and reported on the civil rights movement and the Space Race throughout the 1960s. He was serving as its Los Angeles bureau chief when John F. Kennedy was assassinated. He promptly flew to Dallas and was the first reporter to get in touch with Abraham Zapruder, who captured the shooting in Dealey Plaza on his film. Eager to obtain the footage, Stolley initially wanted to go to Zapruder's house on the night after the assassination to see the film. However, he acquiesced to Zapruder's request to meet at his office the next morning, with the latter citing exhaustion from the events he had witnessed earlier that day. Stolley said this was the "smartest decision I ever made", and "quite possibly the most important of my career".

Stolley arrived an hour ahead of the agreed-upon meeting time to pre-empt other reporters. He offered $50,000 for print publication rights and raised the amount to $150,000 for all rights one week later. Other journalists offered to pay Zapruder more money for the film, but he ultimately gave it to Stolley because he acted like "a gentleman". This reassured Zapruder that his film would never be manipulated by the magazine with a person like Stolley at the helm. Zapruder told Stolley how, on the night of the assassination, he dreamed of a huckster in Times Square peddling his film, indicating that he wanted it to be "handled with care". Stolley later recounted that the Zapruder film was the "single most dramatic moment" in his career as a journalist.

Life halted its weekly run in 1972, which Stolley called a "devastating blow". Two years later, he became the inaugural editor of People magazine when it was first issued in March 1974. During his eight-year tenure, it became the most profitable magazine in the US, with a readership of 2.35 million. He stated that the "biggest mistake" of his career came in 1977, when he spurned the opportunity to put Elvis Presley on the front cover after his death. He went back to Life in 1982, serving first as its managing editor before becoming editorial director of Time Inc., the second-highest editorial management position there. He held the post until his retirement in 1993, but continued to serve as a company adviser.

Stolley replaced David Nuell as executive producer of Extra from 1995 to 1996. He was inducted into the American Society of Magazine Editors Hall of Fame in April 1996. One year later, he was part of the inaugural class of the Medill Hall of Achievement. In 2000, Stolley edited Life: Century of Change: America in Pictures. In 2001 he edited Life: World War Two: History's Greatest Conflict in Pictures. He retired from journalism altogether in 2014.

== Personal life ==
Stolley's first marriage was to Anne Shawber, a newspaper reporter. She had been "pinned" to him while she was a guest editor at Mademoiselle. Together, they had four children: Hope, Martha, Lisa, and Melinda. They divorced due to Stolley's infidelity. His subsequent marriage to Lise Hilboldt also ended in divorce.

Stolley died on June 16, 2021, at a hospital in Evanston, Illinois. He was 92, and suffered from a heart ailment prior to his death.
