= Shaker Run =

- Directed by: Bruce Morrison
- Written by: Jim Kouf; Henry Fownes; Bruce Morrison
- Produced by: Larry Parr; Igo Kantor
- Starring: Cliff Robertson; Leif Garrett; Lisa Harrow; Shane Briant; Peter Rowell; Peter Hayden; Ian Mune; Bruce Phillips
- Cinematography: Kevin Hayward
- Edited by: Ken Zemke; Bob Richardson
- Production company: Mirage – Avicom / Laurelwood Productions
- Release date: 27 March 1985
- Running time: 90 minutes
- Country: New Zealand
- Language: English

Shaker Run is a 1985 New Zealand action film directed by Bruce Morrison and starring Cliff Robertson, Leif Garrett, and Lisa Harrow. It follows a stunt driver Pierson and his ace mechanic Lee on the run from secret police in the South Island of New Zealand with Doctor Rubin, who has stolen a manufactured virus from the government lab where she works (filmed at Larnach Castle), with the intent of delivering it to the CIA.

The "Shaker" of the title refers to the pink and black Trans Am used by the three to outrun the New Zealand secret service.

Derek Malcolm said that the film, "while not exactly an aesthetic experience ... has the best stunts ever accomplished in a New Zealand picture, some of them quite breathtaking". Journalist Dominic Corry, writing in The New Zealand Herald in 2012, called the film a New Zealand classic, and noted that the movie relies "almost entirely on its car stunts". Film critic David Robinson described the film as a "hit-and-miss" and that the story didn't make much "sense", relying on the "dramatic New Zealand scenery and the cars".

The film was considered part of New Zealand's "New Wave" of cinema following the establishment of the New Zealand Film Commission and has been described as among those films that "foregrounded geographical representations of the country while examining male relationships." The film's production was aided by tax breaks in New Zealand in the early 1980s.

== Cast ==
- Cliff Robertson as Judd Pierson; described as "an American star" by critic Robinson
- Leif Garrett as Casey Lee
- Lisa Harrow as Dr. Christine Rubin
- Shane Briant as Paul Thoreau
- Peter Rowell as Mr. Carney
- Peter Hayden as Michael Connoly
- Ian Mune as Barry Gordon
- Bruce Phillips as Dr. Marshall
- Fiona Samuel as Casey's Girl
- Nathaniel Lees as Squad Commander
- Igo Kantor as CIA Man; also a producer on the film
- Shona Laing as Singer
