= Lise Hilboldt =

American actress (born 1954)

- Born: January 7, 1954 (age 71); Racine, Wisconsin, U.S.
- Occupation(s): Actress, writer
- Spouse(s): Allan Mayer (divorced); Richard Stolley (divorced)

Lise Hilboldt (born January 7, 1954) is an American actress. She had a leading role in the film Sweet Liberty (1986), co-starring with writer-director Alan Alda and Michael Caine, and she was featured in Noon Wine (1985).

== Career ==
She appeared in S.O.S. Titanic (1979), Ike (1979), the UK TV series A Married Man (1983), The Hunger (1983), George Washington II: The Forging of a Nation (1986), The Karen Carpenter Story (1989), and Nancy Astor (1982). She has a small role in the film Superman (1978). She co-starred with Ken Howard in the feature adaptation of Mark Twain's Pudd'nhead Wilson.

Hilboldt guest-starred opposite Martin Shaw in an episode of The Professionals titled "A Hiding to Nothing". She played the part of a terrorist who gets close to Doyle. She had a co-starring role as a nightclub singer in the 1983 episode "The King in Yellow" of the series Philip Marlowe, Private Eye.

== Personal life ==
Hilboldt was married to publicist and former journalist Allan Mayer. In the 1990s, they worked together at Buzz Magazine, where Mayer was the founding editor and publisher and Hilboldt wrote a column. In 1997, she married Richard Stolley, the founding editor of People magazine. The marriage ended in divorce. She lives in Santa Fe, New Mexico.

== Filmography ==
=== Film ===
Year	Title	Role	Notes
1978	Superman	1st Secretary	
1983	The Hunger	Waiting Room Nurse	
1986	Sweet Liberty	Gretchen Carlsen	
1995	Wild Bill	Woman in Church	

=== Television ===
Year	Title	Role	Notes
1977	The Mackinnons	Miss. Roth	Episode: "Playboy of the Western Highlands"
1978	Premiere	Miss Stith	Episode: "Something's Wrong"
1979	Ike	Jean Dixon	Episode: "Part I"
1979	S.O.S. Titanic	Rene Harris	Television film
1979	The Professionals	Shelley	Episode: "A Hiding to Nothing"
1982	Nancy Astor	Phyllis	8 episodes
1983	Philip Marlowe, Private Eye	Dolores Chiozza	Episode: "The King in Yellow"
1983	A Married Man	Paula Gerrard	2 episode
1984–1985	American Playhouse	Ellie Thompson / Roxana	2 episode
1986	George Washington II: The Forging of a Nation	Maria Reynolds	Television film
1987	Pound Puppies	Jonathon's Mother	Episode: "Tuffy Gets Fluffy/Casey, Come Home"
1987	Dynasty	Rebecca Payne	Episode: "The Announcement"
1987	My Two Dads	Madelaine	Episode: "Whose Night Is It, Anyway?"
1987	Matlock	Dr. Maggie Crowley	Episode: "The Gift"
1988	My Sister Sam	Linda Burchi	Episode: "Ol' Green Eyes Is Back"
1988	Something Is Out There	Sandy	Episode: "In His Own Image"
1989	The Karen Carpenter Story	Lucy	Television film
1989	Hard Time on Planet Earth	Jane	Episode: "Death Do Us Part"
1989–1992	Murder, She Wrote	Various roles	3 episodes
1993	L.A. Law	Leslie Cromarty	Episode: "Spanky and the Art Gang"
1993	Time Trax	Mary	Episode: "Treasure of the Ages"
1995	Chicago Hope	Cindy Crossland	Episode: "Who Turned out the Lights?"
1996	Norma Jean & Marilyn	Sylvia March	Television film
2009	In Plain Sight	Lucille	Episode: "Aguna Matatala"
2009	Doc West	Santa Fe Woman	Television film
2009	Triggerman	Santa Fe Woman	Television film
