= The Informers (1963 film) =

1963 British film by Ken Annakin

- British theatrical release poster
- Directed by: Ken Annakin
- Written by: Alun Falconer; Paul Durst
- Based on: Death of a Snout; 1961 novel by Douglas Warner
- Produced by: William MacQuitty
- Starring: Nigel Patrick; Margaret Whiting; Katherine Woodville; Colin Blakely; Derren Nesbitt; Harry Andrews
- Cinematography: Reginald H. Wyer
- Edited by: Alfred Roome
- Music by: Clifton Parker
- Production company: Rank Organisation
- Distributed by: Rank Film Distributors
- Release date: 12 November 1963
- Running time: 105 minutes
- Country: United Kingdom
- Language: English

The Informers (U.S. title:Underworld Informers; also known as The Rape of the Underworld) is a 1963 British crime film directed by Ken Annakin and starring Nigel Patrick, Margaret Whiting, Harry Andrews, Derren Nesbitt, Katherine Woodville, and Colin Blakely. It was produced by William MacQuitty, with screenplay by Paul Durst and Alun Falconer from the novel Death of a Snout by Douglas Warner. Cinematography was by Reginald H. Wyer. It was distributed in the UK by The Rank Organisation and the U.S. by Continental Film Distributors.

== Plot ==
The story concerns the uneasy relationship between Scotland Yard Detective John Edward Johnnoe, and Squad Chief Alec Bestwick, over the formerly traditional use of "snouts" (paid informants). Despite being told that these should no longer be used and to adopt more scientific principles of detection, Johnnoe continues to do so until Jim Ruskin, one of his informants, is murdered. He again disobeys orders and pursues his own lines of inquiry but as he closes in on the villains, they frame him for corruption and he is arrested and held in prison. With few friends left on his side of the law, his wife Mary enlists the help of the murdered man's brother.

== Cast ==
- Nigel Patrick as Chief Inspector John Edward Johnnoe
- Margaret Whiting as Maisie Barton
- Katherine Woodville as Mary Johnnoe
- Colin Blakely as Charlie Ruskin
- Derren Nesbitt as Bertie Hoyle
- Harry Andrews as Superintendent Alec Bestwick
- Michael Coles as Ben
- John Cowley as Jim Ruskin
- Allan Cuthbertson as Smythe
- Frank Finlay as Leon Sale
- Ronald Hines as Sergeant Geoff Lewis
- Roy Kinnear as Shorty
- Peter Prowse as Mick Lonergan
- George Sewell as Fred Hill
- Kenneth J. Warren as Lou Waites
- Brian Wilde as Lipson
- Peter Bowles as Peter the Pole
- Patrick Jordan as 1st Inspector
- Donal Donnelly as Tommy the Trotter
- Harry Landis as Hicks

== Production ==
The film was based on Death of a Snout, written by Douglas Warner in association with John Gosling, the head of Scotland Yard’s ‘Ghost Squad’, a section of the police who worked with informers and had a special relation with the underworld. Film rights were bought by producer William MacQuitty who obtained finance from The Rank Organisation, although it insisted the title be replaced by The Informers. The film was set up with director Ken Annakin.

The Informers was filmed at Pinewood Studios and at various locations around London, including the Thames Embankment, Westminster, Soho, Paddington, Covent Garden, Hampstead and Golders Green.

MacQuitty wrote in his memoir A Life to Remember, "The film emerged as an unsentimental, hard-edged account of the framing of a police inspector, and, released in 1963, attracted a huge audience."

== Critical reception ==
Variety called the film a "tough hard hitting cops and robbers thriller" which "crackles along at a brisk pace."

The Monthly Film Bulletin wrote: "Freshly written and shot, with an eye for realism, against settings that are always recognisably London, this effectively indigenous cops and robbers thriller is the sort of old hat that could probably teach some of our "new wave" directors a thing or two. Without overstraining the point, both Alun Falconer's script and Ken Annakin's direction suggest an observation of life rather than a re-statement of other movies, and enable the excellent cast to use their varied talents just that much more convincingly than such an ingenuously routine theme would seem to demand. This applies particularly to Derren Nesbitt's playboy pimp and Maggie Whiting's very human prostitute, but one is no less drawn to familiar faces, like that of Allan Cuthbertson, playing an unpleasantly officious policeman, and Nigel Patrick fits comfortably into the role of the thwarted stalwart of the Yard, whose semi-detached home is, incidentally, quite splendidly authentic. Vigorously directed throughout, the film winds up with an appropriately uninhibited, old-style free-for-all, that could scarcely have been mounted to better effect."

British film critic Leslie Halliwell said: "Basic police melodrama, with clumsy script and jaded direction."

The Radio Times Guide to Films gave the film 2/5 stars, writing: "Nowadays British crime films of the 1950s and 1960s look rather quaint, with the dogged attempts of performers to either act tough and growl in East End argot as they plan their blags, or portray the clipped decency of the Scotland Yard flatfoot. While eminently watchable, this police procedural crime drama from director Ken Annakin is a case in point. Nigel Patrick is the archetypal inspector in a mac, while Frank Finlay is as brutal as a pantomime villain."

In Sixties British Cinema, Robert Murphy writes: "With its convincing underworld characters and quarellsome, imperfect policemen, The Informers represents something of a high point in the development of British crime films. The characters might be stereotypes – the tough but honest detective and his loyal, long-suffering wife, the seedy criminal mastermind and his dangerously flashy front-man, the hard-bitten but vulnerable whore, the irredeemably shifty snout – but they come across as quirkily individual and there is little of the cosy moralising that afflicts so many British crime thrillers. A handful of critics did notice its potential at the time, but it is depressingly symptomatic of attitudes to British cinema that the film has subsequently vanished into critical oblivion."

== Notes ==
- MacQuitty, William (1991). A Life to Remember. Quartet Books.
