= All Creatures Great and Small (film) =

1975 British film by Claude Whatham

- Original British 1975 quad format poster
- Directed by: Claude Whatham
- Screenplay by: Hugh Whitemore
- Based on: If Only They Could Talk & It Shouldn't Happen to a Vet by James Herriot
- Produced by: David Susskind; Duane Bogie executive Ronald Gilbert
- Starring: Simon Ward; Anthony Hopkins; Brian Stirner; Lisa Harrow
- Cinematography: Peter Suschitzky
- Edited by: Ralph Sheldon
- Music by: Wilfred Josephs
- Production companies: Venedon Limited; EMI Films; Talent Associates
- Distributed by: EMI Film Distributors Limited
- Release date: 9 May 1975 (UK)
- Running time: 87 minutes (US version); 120 mins (theatrical version)
- Country: United Kingdom
- Language: English
- Budget: $1.2 million or $1 million

All Creatures Great and Small is a 1975 British film (copyrighted in 1974), directed by Claude Whatham and starring Simon Ward and Anthony Hopkins as Yorkshire vets James Herriot and Siegfried Farnon. It is based on the first novels by James Herriot (the pen name of veterinary surgeon Alf Wight): If Only They Could Talk (1970) and It Shouldn't Happen to a Vet (1972).

The film was given the same title as the 1972 US compilation volume of these two novels. It is the first of a series of films and television series based on Herriot's work. A sequel was released in 1976, somewhat confusingly titled It Shouldn't Happen to a Vet, although it actually covers the two following novels, Let Sleeping Vets Lie and Vet in Harness.

== Premise ==
In 1937, newly qualified vet James Herriot travels to Yorkshire for the post of assistant in Siegfried Farnon's practice. He learns the facts of country life, but has to overcome the prejudices of the Darrowby locals who are sceptical of the novice vet's ability. In between cases, Herriot courts farmer's daughter Helen Alderson.

== Main cast ==
- Simon Ward as James Herriot
- Anthony Hopkins as Siegfried Farnon
- Lisa Harrow as Helen Alderson
- Brian Stirner as Tristan Farnon
- Freddie Jones as Cranford
- T. P. McKenna as Soames
- Brenda Bruce as Miss Harbottle
- John Collin as Mr Alderson
- Christine Buckley as Mrs Hall
- Jane Collins as Connie
- Fred Feast as farmer in cinema
- Glynne Geldart as Joyce
- Harold Goodwin as Dinsdale's uncle
- Doreen Mantle as Mrs Seaton
- John Nettleton as head waiter
- Daphne Oxenford as Mrs Pumphrey
- Bert Palmer as Mr Dean
- John Rees as Geoff Mallock
- Jenny Runacre as Pamela
- Jane Solo as Brenda

== Production ==
=== Development ===
All Creatures Great and Small was a best seller in the US - selling over 3 million copies in the Reader's Digest version - and film rights were optioned.

The film was made for NBC's Hallmark Hall of Fame but it was theatrically released outside the US. The producers were Duane Bogie for FCB Productions and David Susskind for the Talent Associates.

According to one account, the budget was $1.2 million, nearly twice what NBC paid for it. Another account said the budget was $1 million, with $650,000 from NBC, $250,000 from EMI (who distributed), and $100,000 privately raised.

The lead role was given to Simon Ward, who later recalled, "I hadn't known the books and a lot of people hadn't known about them then, so at that time I wasn't taking on a national icon. It's always nerve-wracking playing a real person particularly if that real person is still alive and comes and sits on set watching you. Although Herriot was the most charming wonderful man who I really adored and kept in touch with till he died."

=== Shooting ===
Filming started in May 1974, in the town of Malton, North Riding of Yorkshire. Studio work was done in London. A number of set pieces that were scripted such as Tristan driving a car into a cricket pavilion were cut for lack of money.

Ward said "The roughest thing was putting a hand up a pregnant mare... for the film I had to do it again and again."

=== Music ===
The film's incidental music was by Wilfred Josephs.

Alf Wight (Herriott) wished the film could have been shot in the Yorkshire Dales rather than North Yorkshire but was delighted by the film and the cast. However Donald Sinclair, the model for Siegfried, was upset at his portrayal and threatened to sue. Wight avoided this by reportedly paying Sinclair a percentage of money from the books.

== Release ==
Having passed the British censors in September 1974, the film was not released until 9 May 1975, when it opened in London at the small cinema Studio Two in Oxford Street.

== Reception ==
The Monthly Film Bulletin wrote: "This everyday story of country folk has no ambition beyond an almost obsessive ordinariness, conveyed not through understatement but through clichés. These dominate the life of simple vet James Herriot, whose daily rounds consist entirely of jolly japes and noble sacrifices, and govern director Claude Whatham's evocation of 1937, which is suffocated by a period charm which becomes less charming by the minute: a pre-war packet of Force is placed prominently on the breakfast table, a 'Stop me and buy one' man is placed prominently in the foreground, and so forth. Peter Suschitzky's pretty photography is noteworthy; so too is the performance of Anthony Hopkins, whose bluff, irascible veterinarian shines like a beacon amidst otherwise dull or stock characterisation. Overall, however, the film could not be recommended to anyone other than fans of The Archers and children who derive pleasure from watching people doing unpleasant things to sick animals."

The Times' film critic David Robinson wrote "All Creatures Great and Small is so wholesome and warmhearted it makes you want to scream. Not on account of these qualities in themselves, but because of the director's (Claude Whatham) inability to give them any more depth or meaning than a television series", but acknowledged that Anthony Hopkins' and Simon Ward's playing made their characters somewhat believable.

"It works beautifully", said the New York Times. Filmink called the movie "charming" but felt its memory had been overshadowed by the later TV series.

== Home media ==
The film has been released on DVD for both Region 2 PAL and Region 1 NTSC.

== Sequel ==
A second film, It Shouldn't Happen to a Vet was released in 1976. John Alderton took over the role of James and Colin Blakely that of Siegfried, while Lisa Harrow returned as Helen. The film was directed by Eric Till from a script by Alan Plater.

Starting in 1978, there was a TV series based on the book, which was a huge ratings success in Britain and ran until 1990.

== Notes ==
- Lord, Graham (1997). James Herriot. Carroll & Graf Publishers.
