= It Shouldn't Happen to a Vet =

It Shouldn’t Happen to a Vet
- British cinema poster
- Directed by: Eric Till
- Screenplay by: Alan Plater
- Based on: Let Sleeping Vets Lie & Vet in Harness by James Herriot
- Produced by: Margaret Matheson
- Starring: John Alderton; Colin Blakely; Lisa Harrow; Bill Maynard
- Cinematography: Arthur Ibbetson
- Edited by: Thom Noble
- Music by: Laurie Johnson
- Production companies: EMI Films; Venedon Limited; Reader's Digest Films; Talent Associates
- Distributed by: EMI Films (UK)
- Release date: 11 April 1976 (UK)
- Running time: 93 minutes
- Countries: United Kingdom; United States
- Language: English

It Shouldn't Happen to a Vet (U.S. title: All Things Bright and Beautiful), is a 1976 film directed by Eric Till and starring John Alderton and Colin Blakely. The screenplay was by Alan Plater. It was the sequel to the 1975 film All Creatures Great and Small. Although having the same title as James Herriot's second novel, the film is actually based on his third and fourth novels, Let Sleeping Vets Lie and Vet in Harness, which in the United States were released as a compilation volume titled All Things Bright and Beautiful. The film is part of a series of movies and television series based on Herriot's novels.

In this film, John Alderton has taken over the role of James and Colin Blakely that of Siegfried (portrayed in the first film by Simon Ward and Anthony Hopkins, respectively), while Lisa Harrow returns as Helen. It also features Richard Griffiths in his debut film appearance as Sam.

The film was entered into the 10th Moscow International Film Festival.

== Synopsis ==
The story continues where All Creatures Great and Small ended, and follows the lives of James, Helen and Siegfried from 1938 until the outbreak of war.

== Main cast ==
- John Alderton as James Herriott
- Colin Blakely as Siegfried Farnon
- Lisa Harrow as Helen
- Bill Maynard as Hinchcliffe
- Paul Shelley as Richard
- Richard Pearson as Granville
- Rosemary Martin as Mrs Dalby
- Raymond Francis as Colonel Bosworth
- John Barrett as Crump
- Philip Stone as Jack
- Clifford Kershaw as Kendall
- Kevin Moreton as William
- Liz Smith as Mrs Dodds
- Leslie Sarony as Kirby
- Gwen Nelson as Mrs Kirby

== Production ==
In July 1975 the film was announced as part of a slate of eleven films from EMI with a budget of £6 million. Simon Ward was offered the lead role again but turned it down as his fee was the same as for the first film.

The film was shot in January 1976. It was known during production as All Things Bright and Beautiful.

Herriot's son Jim later recalled:

While John Alderton provided a more forceful James Herriot, with a flash of humour always evident, Colin Blakely’s role as Siegfried was more subdued than the portrayal by Anthony Hopkins. Although he brought some wonderful comedy to the part, there was hardly a trace of the spontaneous eccentricity that was the hallmark of the real man. This was partly because Alf insisted on some changes since he was not prepared to upset Donald again. After reading the scripts in advance of shooting, he was adamant that the peaks and troughs of Siegfried’s character be smoothed out.

John Alderton was offered the part of Herriott in the television version of All Creatures Great and Small but turned it down.

== Reception ==
The Monthly Film Bulletin wrote: "The many enthusiasts of James Herriot's amusing, unaffected tales of life as a Yorkshire vet are unlikely to be disappointed by this competent sequel to All Creatures Great and Small (1974). Although the basis of the plot – James' indecision over whether to abandon Siegfried and his gumboot medicine in favour of Granville's sophisticated urban practice – is largely neglected in the course of the film's loosely connected episodes, several of these are well enough acted (notably by Colin Blakely and John Barrett) and sufficiently gritty ... to sustain the interest of viewers not automatically disposed to such material. ... An exceptionally strong cast of secondary characters has been assembled; and the sensibly unobtrusive approach to the period (which is not allowed to overshadow the animals) is nicely complemented by Arthur Ibbetson's location photography. John Alderton, taking over from Simon Ward as James, plays Herriot as the creditably self-effacing man he appears to be from his books and television appearances, and catches a thoroughly likeable, unsophisticated charm which, for all the movie's commercial facility, is consistently enjoyable."

In The Radio Times Guide to Films David Parkinson gave the film 3/5 stars, writing: "This Yorkshire comedy is ... pleasingly unpretentious entertainment that can enjoyed by the whole family. The formula of pre-war country cosiness, bawdy humour, folksy characterisation and animal emergency is meticulously repeated as John Alderton capably steps into the wellies vacated by Simon Ward."

According to Herriott's biographer, "John Alderton was far and away the best of the three actors who portrayed Alf on screen, with a boyish but twinkly British charm that managed to make him appear shy and gauche without ever being wet or pathetic. Twenty years on Blakely's portrayal of Siegfried does not seem at all 'implacably fierce' but rather serious, honest, warm and highly professional."

According to Filmink the movie "had a better actor to play James Herriott (John Alderton, the great lost British film star of the 1970s) than All Creatures Great and Small, but didn’t have as compelling a story – it started with Herriott already established in Yorkshire and in love, and didn’t add anything much new."

== Home media ==
Released on VHS in the 1990s, the film has yet to see a commercial release on DVD in the UK (region 2) or US (region 1).

== Notes ==
- Lord, Graham (1997). James Herriot. Carroll & Graf Publishers. ISBN 978-0786704606.
