= Patricia O'Connor (playwright) =

Irish Playwright

- Born: Henrietta Norah O'Connor; 4 December 1905; Dunfanaghy, County Donegal, Ireland
- Died: 2 February 1983 (aged 77)
- Occupations: playwright, novelist

Patricia O'Connor (4 December 1905 – 2 February 1983) was an Irish playwright, novelist and teacher.

== Early life and family ==
Patricia O'Connor was born Henrietta Norah O'Connor on 4 December 1905 at Sheephaven coastguard station, Dunfanaghy, County Donegal. She was known to her family as Norah. Her parents were Patrick, coastguard and sailor, and his wife Annie May O'Connor (née Fallon). She had two sisters and a brother, her elder sister was the historian and vice-principal of Portadown High School, Theresa Margaret O'Connor. Her father was transferred to Howth, County Dublin in 1912, and O'Connor attended Celbridge Collegiate School, County Kildare as a border. She remained there after her father was reassigned to Donegal in 1913, and later in November 1918 to Peterhead in Scotland. As her family were Church of Ireland, this relocation may have been due to the Irish political climate.

After passing her Irish intermediate certificate, O'Connor joined her family in Scotland, and attended Dunfermline High School. There she was directed towards a teaching career, which she later recalled: "Like most other teachers I did not choose teaching as a career. I was conscripted." She attended Dalry House teacher training college, Edinburgh from 1924 to 1926, and was awarded a teaching diploma in 1928. She worked for Fife Teaching Authority briefly, but returned to Northern Ireland, where her family had settled following her father's retirement in January 1927. She took over as principal of Viscount Bangor School, Killough after her sister in September 1930, where she worked until 1945, when she developed tuberculosis. Inspectors rated her repeatedly as "highly efficient", but some parents objected to her focus on nature studies and generally progressive educational ethos.

On 25 February 1933, she married William Reginald Ingram, a civil servant. She took the pen name Patricia O'Connor, in honour of her father, and was often referred to as Miss O'Connor to avoid confusion with her mother. She was variously known as Patricia O'Connor, Patricia O'Connor Ingram, Patricia Ingram and P. Norah Ingram.

== Literary career ==
In 1937 she submitted a play to the Abbey Theatre, which was rejected. Radio Éireann broadcast two half-hour plays by O'Connor, Georgina and the dragon: play of the future on 18 July 1938, and Silk stockings 22 November the same year. Nothing more is known of these plays. She had also begun to review books for newspapers, becoming known for her acerbic tone. She published two novels in 1938: The mill in the north in January and Mary Doherty in December. Mary Doherty invokes her childhood in County Donegal, with a character visiting a ruined coastguard station in Dunfanaghy and comments on how the local Protestant families left the area after the creation Northern Ireland. The books also explored the sectarian divides in Donegal, and female sexuality in the face of religion.

From 1937 to 1940, O'Connor corresponded with General Hugh Montgomery, after she joined the Irish Association for Cultural, Economic and Social Relations. She supported Montgomery in a number of newspaper controversies, which included one against her sister Theresa on the historic veracity of the work of William Edward Hartpole Lecky. Her belief was that a reunification of Ireland would result in civil war, and that Irish integration into the British Commonwealth was ultimately inevitable. She addressed the Dublin Women's Social and Progressive League in October 1940, where she spoke about rural depopulation. It was reported that O'Connor was finishing a book on this theme, Voice out of Rama. A play of the same name was later staged in 1944 by the Ulster Group Theatre (UGT), with only fragments of the script now being held by the Linen Hall Library, Belfast.

From the establishment of the UGT in 1940, O'Connor focused almost exclusively on writing theatrical drama. She wrote 8 plays for the Group between 1942 and 1959, 5 of which were staged. This made her the most-produced female Irish dramatist of the period. She was a committee member of Belfast P.E.N. Club, serving as chair in 1951. She resigned from the Club in 1953 after she accused Richard Hayward of being autocratic and hypocritical, and that he used his position as chair to silence his critics. Her 1942 play Highly efficient, a critique of the educational system, was her most successful play. It ran for 5 weeks, was later re-run for another 3 weeks in 1944, and was broadcast in 1945 on BBC Radio Ulster. She and her husband moved from Killough to Belfast in 1958.

Her last play produced was The sparrows fall (1959). After the UGT collapsed in 1960, after a production of Over the bridge by Sam Thompson, O'Connor's career as a playwright was over. She returned to teaching in November 1961 after she was declared free of tuberculosis, teaching in Porter's Memorial School. She wrote for BBC Radio Ulster, with short stories including First love in February 1961 and The parable in reverse. In 1965, she was recorded as part of a radio documentary about the UGT, and later about her own life and career in 1975. She retired in 1969, she and her husband moving to Killyleagh, County Down. She died there on 2 February 1983.

== Selected works ==
=== Plays ===
- Highly efficient (1942)
- Select vestry (1944)
- Canvassing disqualifies (1948)
- Master Adams (1949)
- The farmer wants a wife (1955)
- Who saw her die? (1957) (lost)
- The sparrows fall (1959)
