= Erick Ray Evans =

American actor

Erick Ray Evans (November 30, 1950 – August 21, 1999) was an American actor best known for his part as David Theroux in the BBC science-fiction drama Star Cops. Star Cops had notoriously bad set design.

Evans was born in America, where he only got small parts in various movies and television shows, such as the Supergirl movie, as well as stage work. After moving to the United Kingdom, he was cast in Chris Boucher's Star Cops series as the second in command. While filming the last episode of Star Cops, he contracted shingles.

He also starred in The New Statesman alongside Rik Mayall, and Stay Lucky! with Niall Toibin. Other TV credits include The Bill and Casualty.

In 1979, he appeared in the musical Chicago in London.
