= Colin Blakely =

Northern Irish actor (1930–1987)

- Blakely (left) as Dr. Watson in the film The Private Life of Sherlock Holmes (1970)
- Born: Colin George Blakely; 23 September 1930; Bangor, County Down, Northern Ireland
- Died: 7 May 1987 (aged 56); London, England
- Education: Sedbergh School
- Occupation: Actor
- Years active: 1957–1987
- Spouse: Margaret Whiting (m. 1961)
- Children: 3 sons

Colin George Edward Blakely (23 September 1930 – 7 May 1987) was a Northern Irish stage and screen actor. He was nominated for a BAFTA Award for Best Actor in a Supporting Role for his performance in Sidney Lumet's Equus (1977), and was nominated twice for a Best Actor in Television (1970, 1987). He was also an Olivier Award nominee.

According to the British Film Institute, Blakely's "chunky form and rumpled, good-natured features tended to direct him towards hero's-friend roles, but there was also an impressive toughness and intensity about his work."

== Early life ==
Blakely was born in Bangor, County Down, the son of Victor and Dorothy Blakely (née Ashmore). His mother was a singer in the D'Oyly Carte Opera Company and his father owned a sports retail shop in Belfast. He attended Sedbergh School in Yorkshire, England.

At the age of 18, he started work in his family's sports goods shop in Belfast. After a spell of amateur dramatics with the Bangor Operatic Society, he turned professional aged 27. (Note: Blakely's entry in the Dictionary of Irish Biography says his first professional appearance was in Monmouthshire in 1957; his obituaries in The Times, The Daily Telegraph and The Guardian say Belfast the following year. The Los Angeles Times only mentions engagements "in Belfast and Wales" before his London debut.)

== Career ==
=== Theatre ===
In 1958, Blakely made his Belfast stage debut as Dick McCardle in Stanley Houghton's Master of the House. He also appeared in several Ulster Group Theatre productions, including Gerard McLarnon's The Bonefire (1958) and Patricia O'Connor's The Sparrow's Fall (1959). From 1959 he was at the Royal Court Theatre, appearing in Cock-a-Doodle Dandy, Serjeant Musgrave's Dance and, to critical approval, The Naming of Murderer's Rock. In the Royal Court production of Saint Joan, starring Joan Plowright, he had the small but prominent role of the English Soldier. Blakely himself said, about his transfer to working in England,

I was lucky then because the Royal Court were looking for actors like me at that time. Arden, Wesker, and so forth were writing for your plebians with rough knocked-about looking faces, so I got a job quite easily.

In 1961, he joined the Royal Shakespeare Company at Stratford-upon-Avon, before joining the National Theatre for its opening in 1963 at the Old Vic; he was part of the NT cast that toured Moscow in 1965, the first time a foreign company was allowed to perform at the Kremlin. Critics and theatre historians have numbered Blakely among the actors like Maggie Smith and Derek Jacobi whose talent emerged in the NT's early years; Laurence Olivier specifically named him as an example of the "Versatile... deeply enthusiastic, courageous, gifted" actors he had sought to hire as director.

Among the many stage plays in which he appeared were The Recruiting Officer, The Royal Hunt of the Sun, Filumena Marturano, Volpone and Oedipus. He returned to the Royal Shakespeare in 1971 in Harold Pinter's Old Times and was subsequently in many West End plays.

In 1977, he was nominated for the Olivier Award for Actor of the Year in a New Play for his performance in Just Between Ourselves.

=== Film ===
Notable film roles included Maurice Braithwaite in This Sporting Life (1963), Sir Thomas More's house servant Matthew in A Man for All Seasons (1966), Dr. Watson to Robert Stephens's Holmes in Billy Wilder's The Private Life of Sherlock Holmes (1970), and the ageing Joseph Stalin in Jack Gold's Red Monarch (1983), a part he played with his native Ulster accent. (Note: Red Monarch was made by Britain's Channel 4 but released theatrically there and in other territories. Blakely's Stalin and David Suchet's Beria both had Irish accents, to highlight that they were Georgians.) In the 1975 British film, It Shouldn't Happen to a Vet, derived from the James Herriot books, Blakely played gruff Yorkshire vet Siegfried Farnon. (Note: He also screen-tested for the lead role in Morgan – A Suitable Case for Treatment, which went instead to David Warner.)

On stage, Blakely played the psychiatrist in Peter Shaffer's Equus, but for Sidney Lumet's 1977 film adaptation of the play he took the part of the tormented young protagonist's father; he was nominated for a BAFTA Award for Best Actor in a Supporting Role. He appeared in two films based on the Hercule Poirot novels of Agatha Christie, described as having "all-star" casts: Murder on the Orient Express (1974) and Evil Under the Sun (1982). Other film roles included The Long Ships (1964), Young Winston (1972), The National Health (1973), The Pink Panther Strikes Again (1976), The Dogs of War (1980), Nijinsky (1980) and Loophole (1981).

His last film role was in the Italian comedy The World of Don Camillo (1984), directed by and starring Terence Hill.

=== Television ===
In 1969, Blakely's controversial role as an anguished Jesus Christ in Dennis Potter's Son of Man gained him wide recognition. He became a regular on British television, and in the same year played the leading role in a BBC adaptation of Anthony Trollope's The Way We Live Now. In The Hanged Man (1975), he starred as a tycoon who fakes his own death in order to find out who has tried to assassinate him.

Noted for his skill in Shakespearean parts, Blakely appeared on television as Antony in Antony and Cleopatra (1981), directed by Jonathan Miller as part of the BBC Television Shakespeare series; and as Kent in the 1983 Granada Television version of King Lear which starred Laurence Olivier. (Note: During his lifetime, Blakely expressed the wish to play Lear himself one day; several obituarists mourned the fact that his early death meant he never had the opportunity.) Other television appearances included The Beiderbecke Affair (1985), Operation Julie (1985) and Paradise Postponed (1986). His work as a white Zimbabwean adjusting to majority rule, in Douglas Livingstone's BBC-TV play Drums Along Balmoral Drive (1986), won him a BAFTA nomination. He last appeared onscreen in a 1987 production of The Birthday Party, broadcast a month after his death.

== Personal life ==
In 1961 Blakely married British actress Margaret Whiting: they had worked together in A Moon for the Misbegotten the previous year. The couple had three sons, Drummond, Cameron and Hamish.

=== Death ===
Until two months before his death from leukaemia, he was performing in A Chorus of Disapproval in the West End while undergoing chemotherapy. Though visibly in pain from the disease, he recorded a video appeal for routine cancer tests. Blakely died, aged 56, at the Middlesex Hospital on 7 May 1987.

== Legacy ==
During his lifetime, Blakely was named as one of a postwar generation of British actors who succeeded in making provincial accents more widely heard; in 1993, Belfast actor Stephen Rea said, "Colin Blakely made it possible for all Irish actors to speak in their own voices". In September 2022, a blue plaque in his honour was unveiled at Bangor Drama Club's Studio 1A site.

== Filmography ==
- Saturday Night and Sunday Morning (1960) – Loudmouth
- The Hellions (1961) – Matthew Billings
- The Password Is Courage (1962) – 1st German Goon
- This Sporting Life (1963) – Maurice Braithwaite
- The Informers (1963) – Charlie Ruskin
- The Long Ships (1964) – Rhykka
- Never Put It in Writing (1964) – Oscar
- The Counterfeit Constable (1964) – L'aveugle
- A Man for All Seasons (1966) – Matthew
- The Spy with a Cold Nose (1966) – Russian Premier
- Charlie Bubbles (1967) – Smokey Pickles
- The Day the Fish Came Out (1967) – The Pilot
- The Vengeance of She (1968) – George
- Decline and Fall... of a Birdwatcher (1968) – Solomon Philbrick
- Alfred the Great (1969) – Asher
- The Private Life of Sherlock Holmes (1970) – Dr. Watson
- Something to Hide (1972) – Blagdon
- Young Winston (1972) – Butcher
- The National Health (1973) – Edward Loach
- Murder on the Orient Express (1974) – Cyrus B. Hardman
- Galileo (1975) – Priuli
- It Shouldn't Happen to a Vet (1975) – Siegfried Farnon
- The Pink Panther Strikes Again (1976) – Alec Drummond
- Equus (1977) – Frank Strang
- The Big Sleep (1978) – Harry Jones
- Meetings with Remarkable Men (1979) – Tamil
- The Day Christ Died (1980) - Caiaphas
- Nijinsky (1980) – Vassili
- Little Lord Fauntleroy (1980) – Silas Hobbs
- The Dogs of War (1980) – North
- Loophole (1981) – Gardner
- Nailed (1981) – Elder Protestant
- Evil Under the Sun (1982) – Sir Horace Blatt
- Trail of the Pink Panther (1982) – Alec Drummond (archive footage) (uncredited)
- The World of Don Camillo (1984) – Peppone

== Awards and nominations ==
Award	Year	Category	Work	Result	Ref.
British Academy Film Award	1978	Best Actor in a Supporting Role	Equus	Nominated	
British Academy Television Award	1970	Best Actor	The Wednesday Play ("Son Man" / "The Way We Live Now")	Nominated	
British Academy Television Award	1987	Best Actor	ScreenPlay ("Drums Across Balmoral Drive")	Nominated	
Laurence Olivier Award	1977	Actor of the Year in a New Play	Just Between Ourselves	Nominated	

== Bibliography ==
- Halliwell, Leslie; Purser, Philip (1987). Halliwell's Television Companion (3rd ed.). London: Paladin. ISBN 0-586-08540-8.
- Hartnoll, Phyllis; Found, Peter, eds. (1992). The Concise Oxford Companion to the Theatre (2nd ed.). Oxford: Oxford University Press. ISBN 0-19-866136-3.
