= John Neish Ritchie =

Scottish veterinarian (1904–1977)

Sir John Neish Ritchie FRSE FZS PRCVS CB LLD (19 January 1904–28 September 1977) was a 20th-century Scottish veterinarian who rose to the top of his profession.

== Life ==
He was born in Turriff in north-east Scotland on 19 January 1904 the youngest son of Annie Watson and her husband, John Neish Ritchie, a general merchant. He was educated at Turriff Higher Grade School. He then studied at the Royal Dick Veterinary College in Edinburgh graduating in 1925, he then undertook postgraduate studies at the University of Edinburgh, graduating with a BSc degree in 1927.

After a period in private practice he joined the staff of the Department of Agriculture in 1938 and rose to be Chief Veterinary Officer in 1952.

In 1957 he was elected a Fellow of the Royal Society of Edinburgh. His proposers were Sir William Weipers, Robert Garry, James Norman Davidson and William McGregor Mitchell.

He was created a Commander of the Order of the Bath in 1955 and knighted by Queen Elizabeth II in the 1961 New Year Honours. He was President of the Royal College of Veterinary Surgeons in 1959. In 1965 he was appointed Principal of the Royal Veterinary College in London holding the post until retiral in 1970.

He died in Aberdeen on 28 September 1977.

== Family ==
In 1930 he married Florina Margaret Drummond (d.1975).
