= Hebeler =

Hebeler is a surname. Notable people with the surname include:

- Henry Felix Clement Hebeler (1917–1989), British veterinary surgeon
- Nick Hebeler (born 1957), Canadian football player

== Locations ==
- Hebeler, Yığılca, village in Turkey

== See also ==
- Hegeler (disambiguation)
