= Joan O. Joshua =

English veterinary surgeon (1912–1993)

Joan Joshua
- Born: Joan Olive Joshua; 11 July 1912; Finchley, London, United Kingdom
- Died: 21 February 1993 (aged 80); Wirral, England, United Kingdom
- Citizenship: United Kingdom
- Education: St. Michael's Convent
- Alma mater: Royal Veterinary College
- Occupations: Veterinary surgeon; Feminist; Dog breeder

Joan Olive Joshua (11 July 1912 – 21 February 1993) was an English veterinary surgeon, dog breeder and feminist. She worked at her one-person private practice in Finchley, London from 1939 to 1962. Joshua was the first female fellow of the Royal College of Veterinary Surgeons (RCVP) and the first woman to serve on the RCVP council. She served as a councillor for the National Veterinary Medical Association (now the British Veterinary Association) and successfully campaigned for the Animal Health Trust to be founded. Joshua was a reader at the University of Liverpool School of Veterinary Science's Department of Clinical Studies. She was the first woman to receive each of the RCVS Francis Hogg Prize and the Victory Medal of the Central Veterinary Society.

== Biography ==
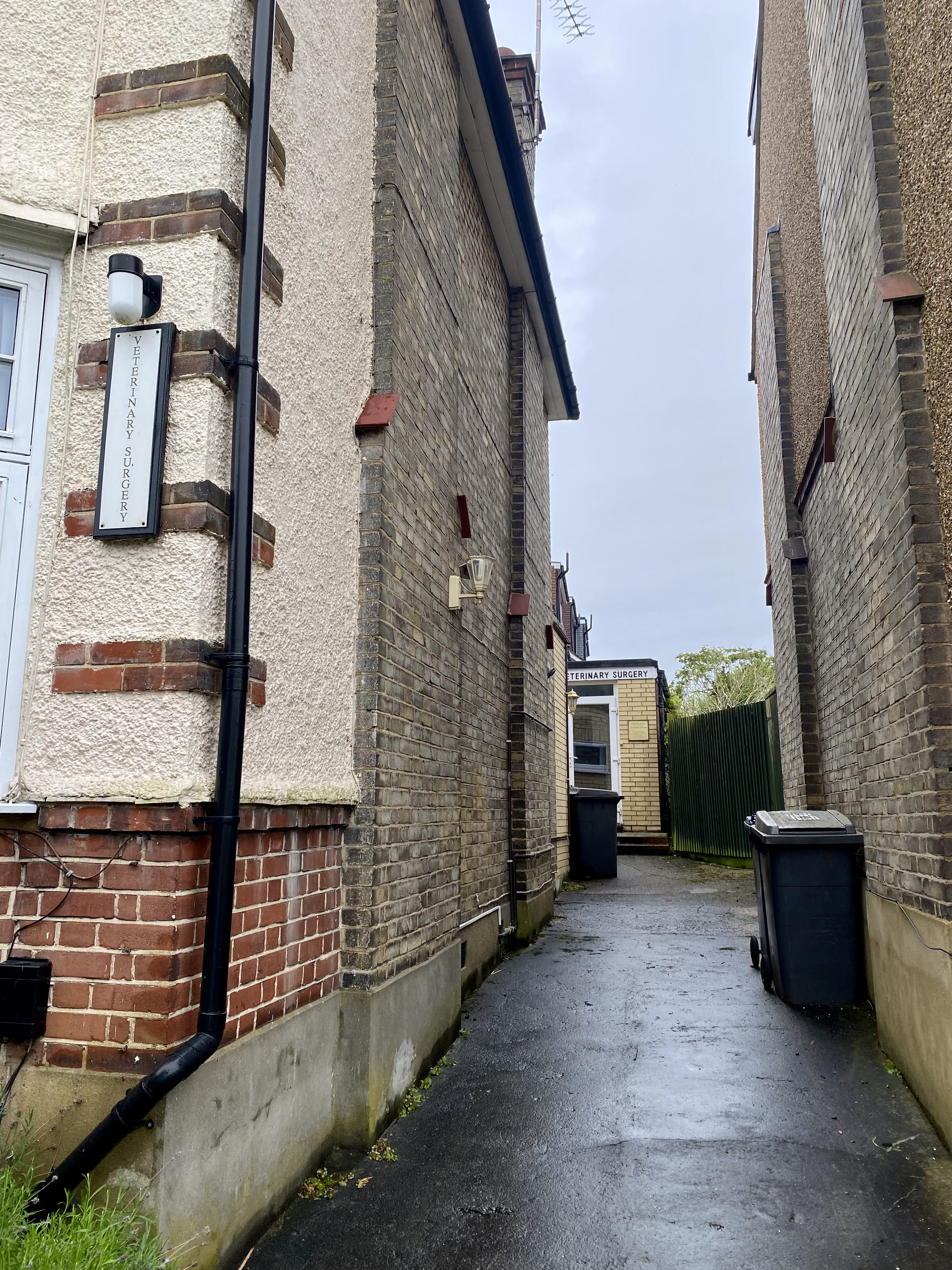
The entrance to the veterinary surgery at 78 Brent Way, Finchley in 2024

On 11 July 1912, Joshua was born in Finchley, London, United Kingdom. When she was 11 years old, her father died, causing her mother to work through the Post–First World War recession. Joshua was educated at St. Michael's Convent in Finchley. She began attending the Royal Veterinary College (RVC) in London in 1933 due to the limited availability of student grants. Joshua earned five subject and two Centenary Medals as the best performing students in her fourth and fifth years. She graduated from the RVC in 1938.

Between 1938 and 1939, Joshua was appointed a house surgeon at Beaumont Hospital. She established her own one-person private practice in the front room of the Finchley home of her mother, just before the outbreak of the Second World War in 1939. Joshua was called up to work for the war effort as a veterinary surgeon by the Ministry of Labour in mid-1941 since men were not allowed to hold reserved occupations but successfully challenged the Ernest Bevin's Whitehall Ministry on this for sex discrimination against women. That same year, she co-established with Margaret Bentley the Society of Women Veterinary Surgeons, and was elected its first president. Joshua authored several clinical publications and was a member of multiple committees.

Her veterinary practice was based at 78 Brent Way, in Finchley's Church End district.

She successfully campaigned for the founding of the Animal Health Trust, 3,000 unqualified practitioners in the United Kingdom to be struck off in 1943, and educating veterinary surgeons at universities only such as in Bristol and Cambridge. Joshua was a councillor of the National Veterinary Medical Association (now the British Veterinary Association) between 1941 and 1953. In 1950, Joshua was the first women to be elected Fellow of the Royal College of Veterinary Surgeons (RCVS), and the first female to receive the RCVS Francis Hogg Prize in 1959. She served on the council of the RCVS from 1953 to 1963 and the sole female member of the British Veterinary Codex Committee between 1950 and 1965; Joshua was considered for the presidency of the RCVS council but it decided not appropriate to elect a non-practising veterinarian to the position.

Joshua stopped working at her private practice in 1962, and was invited so that she could be accepted to the appoint of a readership at the University of Liverpool School of Veterinary Science's Department of Clinical Studies that same year. She had not been used to cooperating with others as she had not done in private practice but colleagues and students well-received her. In 1968, Joshua set-up the Society for Women Veterinary Surgeons Trust aiming to support women's education in veterinary science. She retired in 1973. Joshua worked for the local branch of the People's Dispensary for Sick Animals, advised the Mutual Defence Society, and was a member of the Institute of Advanced Motorists.

She was the first female to be named recipient of the Victory Medal of the Central Veterinary Society for 1976 to 1977. Joshua had a hobby of dog breeding. From her days at school until her 70s, she bred Chow Chows. Joshua won the Reserve Breed Championship at Crufts five times, and was vice-president of the National Chow Club and the Chinese Chow Club's president for a decade. She worked as a show judge for more than half a century, and lectured to breeders.

== Personal life ==
Joshua was referred to by all as "Auntie Joan" and was a feminist. On 21 February 1993, she died on the Wirral Peninsula. Joshua did not marry.

== Legacy ==
Edward Boden, writing in The Independent, calls Joshua "a no-nonsense, hard-working veterinary surgeon who pioneered the role of women in her profession", and, "a firm but understanding lecturer who gave a sound grounding in dog and cat medicine and surgery backed by equally sound advice on the tyro veterinarian's choice of career." The Times correspondent wrote of Joshua: "A Woman of unusual determination, Joan Joshua was afraid of no one."
