= McFadyean =

McFadyean is a surname. Notable people with the surname include:

- Andrew McFadyean (1887–1974), British diplomat and economist
- Colin McFadyean (born 1943), England International rugby union player and Captain
- John McFadyean (1853–1941), British veterinary surgeon
- Melanie McFadyean (1950–2023), British journalist and lecturer
- Ben McFadyean (born 1969), British sports journalist and academic
