= William Christopher Miller =

William Christopher Miller FRSE (19 May 1898 – 17 December 1976) was a 20th century British veterinary surgeon and author. He was President of the National Veterinary Association in 1940.

== Life ==
Miller was born in the British Central Africa Protectorate in 1898 and was educated at the Royal Grammar School in Colchester in England. He then trained as a veterinary surgeon at the Royal Dick Vet School in Edinburgh.

Around 1920 he began lecturing in Animal Hygiene at the East of Scotland College of Agriculture. In 1927 he moved to the University of Edinburgh to lecture in animal genetics.

In 1930 he was elected a Fellow of the Royal Society of Edinburgh. His proposers were Francis Albert Eley Crew, James Ritchie, Orlando Charnock Bradley and James Hartley Ashworth.

In 1935 he was offered a chair as Professor of Animal Husbandry at the Royal Veterinary College in London. He was created Director of the College in 1946 and held this role until his retirement in 1966.

Professor Miller also became the Director of Equine Research at the Animal Health Trust in Newmarket, England. He was my father's cousin. He lived in Lanswade House in Newmarket. When I was a child, we visited several times and I remember that he had a large herd of Shetland ponies out in the field behind the house. He wrote the first veterinary book for farmers. It was called Black's Veterinary Dictionary.

In 1945 he undertook a major survey of animal husbandry in the West Indies.

== Publications ==
- Some Parasites of British Sheep (1925)
- Practical Animal Husbandry (1933 with multiple later editions)
- Encyclopedia of Animal Care (1972)
