= Simon Onwu =

Nigerian medical doctor

Simon Onwu M.D. OBE
- Born: Simon Ezevwo Onwu; December 28, 1908; Affa
- Died: 4 June 1969 (aged 60); London
- Parents: Chief Amadi Onwubunta (father); Madam Nwalute Onwubunta (mother)

Simon Ezevuo Onwu, M.D. OBE (28 December 1908 – 4 June 1969) was a Nigerian physician and the first Nigerian Indigenous medical doctor whose prominence is credited to have accelerated the formation of the Igbo Union.

== Early life ==
He was born on 28 December 1908 in Affa in Udi Local Government Area of Enugu State. He was the son of Chief Amadi Onwubunta and Madam Nwalute Onwubunta of Amozalla Affa in Udi Local Government Area. His father was an aristocrat closely associated with King Onyeama the King of Waawa.

== Education ==
He began his elementary schooling at St. Mary's School, Onitsha where he was brought up as a Catholic. He then attended the Wesley Boys' High School Lagos, but later transferred to King's College Lagos. However, he did not complete his secondary education in Lagos for in 1924 he accompanied Chief Onyeama Onwusi of Eke as his personal confidant on an extended trip of the United Kingdom. He returned to Britain in 1925 to study and in 1927 obtained his London Matriculation Certificate. Later that year he went to University of Edinburgh Medical School and obtained the degrees of MB and ChB in July 1932, therefore becoming the first Indigenous medical doctor from Nigeria. He also obtained the Diploma in Tropical Medicine and Hygiene from the University of Liverpool in 1932. After that he went to Coombe Hospital in the Republic of Ireland and got his Licentiate in Midwifery.

== Career ==
Simon Onwu returned to Nigeria in 1933 and joined the Colonial Civil Service as a junior medical officer in Port Harcourt where he spent the next two years. His return to Eastern Nigeria coincided with the emergence of political activities among Igbos in the new urban setting of colonial Nigeria. It is on record that the first time in which Port Harcourt's Igbos acted in concert and upon awareness of their common linguistic and cultural heritage was the occasion of the "welcome home" reception held for Onwu by prominent Igbos there. The success of the Port Harcourt reception was instrumental in the decision to transform the Reception Committee into a permanent Igbo Union in Port Harcourt. His return also inspired the formation of similar cultural organisations in Lagos and elsewhere in the country. He worked as a medical officer in different parts of Nigeria for the next 27 years. In 1948, he returned to Britain for a postgraduate course and in 1950 became Senior Medical Officer in Aba. He was promoted two years later to the grade of deputy director of Medical Services in the Eastern Region. In 1957, he became the first African Director of Medical Services in Eastern Region, holding the post along with that of Permanent Secretary in the Ministry of Health until he retired from the Public Service in 1963.

== Honours and awards ==
In 1953, Onwu was awarded the Coronation Medal and in 1954 and 1956 Queen Elizabeth II of the United Kingdom created him an Officer of Order of the British Empire (OBE) and Member of the Royal Vatican Order respectively in recognition of his contributions and achievements. In recognition of his devout life as a Catholic, he was awarded the Papal Order of the Knight of Saint Sylvester by Pope Paul VI. In 1968 he was again honoured by the Vatican by having his name enrolled in the Papal Scroll of Honour.

== Later life and death ==
In June 1964, he was appointed Chairman of the Eastern Nigerian Housing Corporation, a post he held until his death. In 1965, he was elected the first African vice-president of the International Union of Building Societies. He travelled extensively visiting the United States of America, USSR, Germany and India under the auspices of the World Health Organisation and representing Nigeria in Many world conferences. He was Chairman of the Red Cross Society, Eastern Nigeria; Chairman of Cosmas and Damain; and Vice-Patron of the Society for the Prevention of Cruelty to Children. During the Nigerian civil war, Dr Onwu had a prolonged illness that made him to travel to London for medical treatment. He died at St Bart's Hospital, London on 4 June 1969.
