= SCRM =

SCRM may refer to:

- Scottish Centre for Regenerative Medicine
- Supply chain risk management
