= Stewart Stockman =

British veterinarian

Sir Stewart Stockman MRCVS (1869–1926) was a 19th/20th century British veterinarian who served as Chief Veterinary Officer to the Ministry of Agriculture and as President of the Royal College of Veterinary Surgeons for the year 1923/24 and President of the National Veterinary Association. He was an expert on foot and mouth disease.

== Life ==
He was born on 27 September 1869 in Wellington Street in Leith (the harbour area of Edinburgh) the fourth son of William John Stockman (d. 1908), a flour importer, and his wife. He was younger brother to Ralph Stockman. The family moved to a larger house at 2 Bonnington Place in 1870.

He was educated at the Royal High School, Edinburgh then studied Veterinary Science at the Royal Veterinary College on Clyde Street in Edinburgh under Prof Thomas Walley. He did postgraduate studies in animal pathology in both Paris and Brussels and returned to Edinburgh in 1892 as Professor of Pathology and Bacteriology at his alma mater.

After seven years at the college he left Scotland in 1899 to serve in the Second Boer War At the end of the war in 1902 he went to work in India then moved in 1903 to work as Chief Veterinary Officer to the Transvaal, concentrating on diseases of cattle and tropical diseases in general. In 1905 he obtained the highly prestigious position as Chief Veterinary Officer to the Department of Agriculture and Fisheries. He was Director of their research laboratory at Weybridge. His main claim to fame during his term of office was in the elimination of glanders from Great Britain and in the creation of the Tuberculosis Order of 1925 which eliminated the risk of tuberculosis in cattle spreading to humans through the consumption of milk.

He was knighted on 1 January 1913 by King George V for veterinary services to the United Kingdom. From this time he was working under Sir Sydney Olivier and Sir Thomas Elliott at the Board of Agriculture and Fisheries.

He died at 16 Newton Terrace in Glasgow, the home of his brother Ralph, on 2 June 1926.

== Family ==
In 1908 he married Ethel McFadyean, daughter of his colleague, Sir John McFadyean FRSE. They had two daughters.
