= Mettam =

Mettam is a surname. Notable people with the surname include:

- Albert Edward Mettam (1867–1917), Irish veterinarian, university principal, and professor
- George Mettam (1891–1967), Australian rower
- Leon Mettam (born 1986), English footballer
- Libby Mettam (born 1977), Australian politician
- Ned Mettam (1868–1943), English footballer

== See also ==
- John Mettam Richardson (1872–1920), English footballer
- Mettam Memorial Baptist Church, historic church in Maryland, United States
