= James Law (disambiguation) =

James Law (c. 1560–1632) was an Archbishop of Glasgow.

James or Jim Law may also refer to:

- James Law (veterinary surgeon) (1838–1921), British-American veterinarian
- James H. Law (1899–?), American football coach
- James O. Law (1809–1847), American politician and merchant
- James R. Law Jr. (1885–1952), American politician
- James Thomas Law (1790–1876), English cleric who was chancellor of the diocese of Lichfield
- James Law (sprinter), winner of the 2002 NCAA Division I 4 × 400 meter relay championship
