= Morley Sewell =

British veterinarian (1932–2022)

Professor (Major) Morley Hodkin Sewell (1 September 1932 – 24 February 2022) was a British veterinarian who served as Dean of the Dick Vet School in Edinburgh from 1994 to 1997. He was an expert on tropical diseases of animals.

== Life ==
Sewell was born on 1 September 1932 in Sheffield to Edith Mary (nee Hodkin) and Major John Sewell, a pharmaceutical chemist. He was educated at the King Edward VII School, Sheffield. He studied veterinary medicine at Trinity Hall, Cambridge graduating with a BA MB around 1955. He was a Member of the Royal College of Veterinary Surgeons.

He then served as a Major in the Veterinary Service in Nigeria from June 1957. During his service in Africa he became an expert on tropical medicine. He was awarded a PhD by the University of Cambridge in 1962 for research undertaken in Cambridge and Northern Nigeria.

In 1994 he replaced Prof Richard Halliwell as Dean of the Faculty of Veterinary Science at the University of Edinburgh based at the Dick Vet School. He retired in 1997.

From 1998 to 2000 he is listed as a company director, living at 14 Craigiebield Crescent in Penicuik.

In 2013 he wrote the obituary for his colleague Dr John Arthur Hammond.

Sewell died from COVID-19 in 2022, during the COVID-19 pandemic in Scotland.

== Artistic recognition ==
Sewell was one of 20 "shadow portraits" created in the Summerhall building of the college, depicting former Principals. The portraits are now in the Easter Bush buildings.

== Family ==
Morley married Cynthia (née Hanson) on 10 August 1957. Together they had three daughters, Mary, Ruth and Rebecca and a son Paul.

== Publications ==
- Handbook on Animal Diseases in the Tropics
