= Andrew McFadyean =

British diplomat and politician

Sir Andrew McFadyean

Sir Andrew McFadyean (23 April 1887 – 2 October 1974) was a British diplomat, economist, Treasury official, businessman, Liberal politician, publicist and philosopher. He was born at Leith in Scotland and died at St Mary's Hospital, Paddington, London.

== Early life ==
He was the son of Sir John McFadyean, Principal of the Royal Veterinary College in London and his wife Mara Eleanor Walley, eldest daughter of Thomas Walley (1842-1894), Principal of the Dick Vet school in Edinburgh.

He attended University College School, London, and University College, Oxford, where he graduated with a second class in classical honour moderations (1907) and a first in literae humaniores (1909).

== Family ==
His marriage to Dorothea Emily, youngest daughter of Charles Kean Chute (1858-1905), an actor and theatre manager, and Sybil Claridge (née Andrews; 1860-1930), an actress, took place on 7 October 1913.

There were four children from the marriage: a son, Colin, who was born in 1914, and three daughters, Sybil Barbara (b. 1917), Margaret Ann (b. 1925), and Joan Eleanor (b. 1930).

== Career in public service ==
In 1910 McFadyean joined the Treasury and between 1913 and 1917 he acted as private secretary to six financial secretaries. The latter included Charles Masterman, Edwin Montagu, and Stanley Baldwin; he also doubled as private secretary to Sir John Bradbury, the joint permanent secretary. He accompanied Sir Samuel Hardman Lever on an important financial mission to the USA in 1917; from 1917 to 1919, he served in the Treasury division, where his responsibilities included external finance. During the final four months of the peace conference in Paris after World War 1, he acted as representative for the Treasury, becoming its leading expert on World War I reparations and war debts, and establishing a reputation in the European capitals. From 1920 to 1922, he was the secretary of the British delegation to the Reparation Commission; from 1922 to 1924, he was general secretary to the Commission itself. Later he became secretary to the Dawes Committee (which produced the Dawes Plan) and subsequently Chief Commissioner of Revenue in Berlin until his departure from this sphere in 1930.

In 1924, he worked for a reduction in German reparations; in this he agreed with John Maynard Keynes, whose book, The Economic Consequences of the Peace, had been published in 1919. German finances had been devastated by hyper-inflation. The Dawes Committee, for which McFadyean was secretary, instituted the Dawes Plan, which proposed that reparations should be paid, but without distorting rates of exchange. The payment of reparations was rescheduled, and they were met by raising taxes in Germany as its economy recovered. The German currency, the Reichsmark, would be stabilised on gold, thus bringing about a restoration of confidence and enabling an international loan to be raised to cover the instalment for the first year. Reparations were to be held in a fund. Conversion of this fund into other currencies would not be permitted if this brought about a depreciation of the Reichsmark. He became one of four allied controllers supervising payments under the Dawes Plan, and he was based in Berlin as commissioner for controlled revenues. McFadyean was knighted in 1925. In 1929 the Dawes Plan was replaced by the Young Plan, with which he had no direct part, and this aimed at a final settlement of reparations.

Upon his return from Berlin, he did not rejoin the Treasury, but instead started a career in the City of London. He became a director of various companies, particularly of refugee firms from Germany. He was chairman of S. G. Warburg & Co. from its inception in 1934 (as the New Trading Company Ltd) until 1952, and a director until 1967, by which time it had become a major merchant bank.

== Politics ==
His career in politics started in 1936, when he became the joint treasurer of the Liberal Party, a post which he held until 1948. He served as President of the Party from 1949 to 1950 and Vice-President from 1950 to 1960. His attempts to be elected to Parliament in 1945 as the Liberal and Free Trade candidate for the City of London, and 1950 for Finchley were unsuccessful. He advocated proportional representation, and was a supporter of the Scottish Covenant, which worked towards a devolved Scottish parliament. He opposed the abolition of nuclear weapons, arguing that it was an impossibility.

== Furtherance of international co-operation ==
From 1933 to 1967, he was a member of the council of the Royal Institute of International Affairs (Chatham House), becoming its president in 1970. In 1944 he became chairman of the Pacific Relations committee. He advocated European unity on liberal principles and translated two books from German into English by Count Richard von Coudenhove-Kalergi: The Totalitarian State Against Man (1938), arguing against the Hegelian conception of the state, and Europe must Unite (1940), calling for a European commonwealth based on a European ideal transcending, without weakening, national patriotisms. In 1941, and with the Treaty of Versailles in mind, McFadyean was already arguing against repressive measures toward a post-war Germany.

He was active in the Liberal International, helping to create this body after the Second World War and serving as its vice-president from 1954 to 1967. He strongly supported the idea of the European Common Market and, believing that tariffs and monopolist and restrictive practices in industry were wrecking the UK's competitiveness, he served as president of the Free Trade Union from 1948 to 1959. He helped persecuted Jews (also urging the admission of Jewish refugees to Palestine) and enemy aliens who had been unjustly interned by the UK during the war.

He worked with John MacCallum after the Second World War to organise the Liberal International, which succeeded the pre-war 'Entente Internationale des Partis Radicaux et Démocratiques'. The Liberal International was established at Wadham College, Oxford, in 1947 and McFadyean became its vice-president.

== Archives ==
- Catalogue of the McFadyean papers held at LSE Archives

Party political offices
Preceded by New position	Treasurer of the Liberal Party; 1937–1950	Succeeded by Percy Heffer
Preceded by Elliott Dodds	President of the Liberal Party; 1949–1950	Succeeded by Philip Fothergill
