= University of Edinburgh Medical School =

Medical school in City of Edinburgh, Scotland

Coordinates: 55°55′19.42″N 3°8′11.86″W

- Other name: Edinburgh Medical School
- Type: Medical school
- Established: 1726; 300 years ago
- Parent institution: University of Edinburgh College of Medicine and Veterinary Medicine
- Head of School: David C. Kluth
- Administrative staff: 2,194 FTE (2024; including 1,325 academic)
- Students: 1,755 (2023/24)
- Undergraduates: 1,505 (2023/24)
- Postgraduates: 245 (2023/24)
- Location: Edinburgh, Scotland, United Kingdom
- Campus: The Medical School, Teviot Place Chancellor's Building, RIE Western General Hospital Royal Hospital for Children and Young People
- Colours: Dark red, light red and pale yellow (or "liver, blood and pus")
- Website: www.ed.ac.uk/medicine-vet-medicine/edinburgh-medical-school

The University of Edinburgh Medical School (also known as Edinburgh Medical School) is the medical school within the College of Medicine and Veterinary Medicine at the University of Edinburgh in Scotland.

The medical school was established in 1726, during the Scottish Enlightenment, making it the oldest medical school in the United Kingdom and the oldest medical school in the English-speaking world.

The medical school is associated with 13 Nobel Prize laureates: 7 in the Nobel Prize in Physiology or Medicine and 6 in the Nobel Prize in Chemistry. Graduates of the medical school have founded medical schools and universities all over the world including 5 out of the 7 Ivy League medical schools (Harvard, Yale, Columbia, Pennsylvania and Dartmouth), Vermont, McGill, Sydney, Montréal, the Royal Postgraduate Medical School (now part of Imperial College London), the Cape Town, Birkbeck, Middlesex Hospital and the London School of Medicine for Women (both now part of UCL).

== History ==
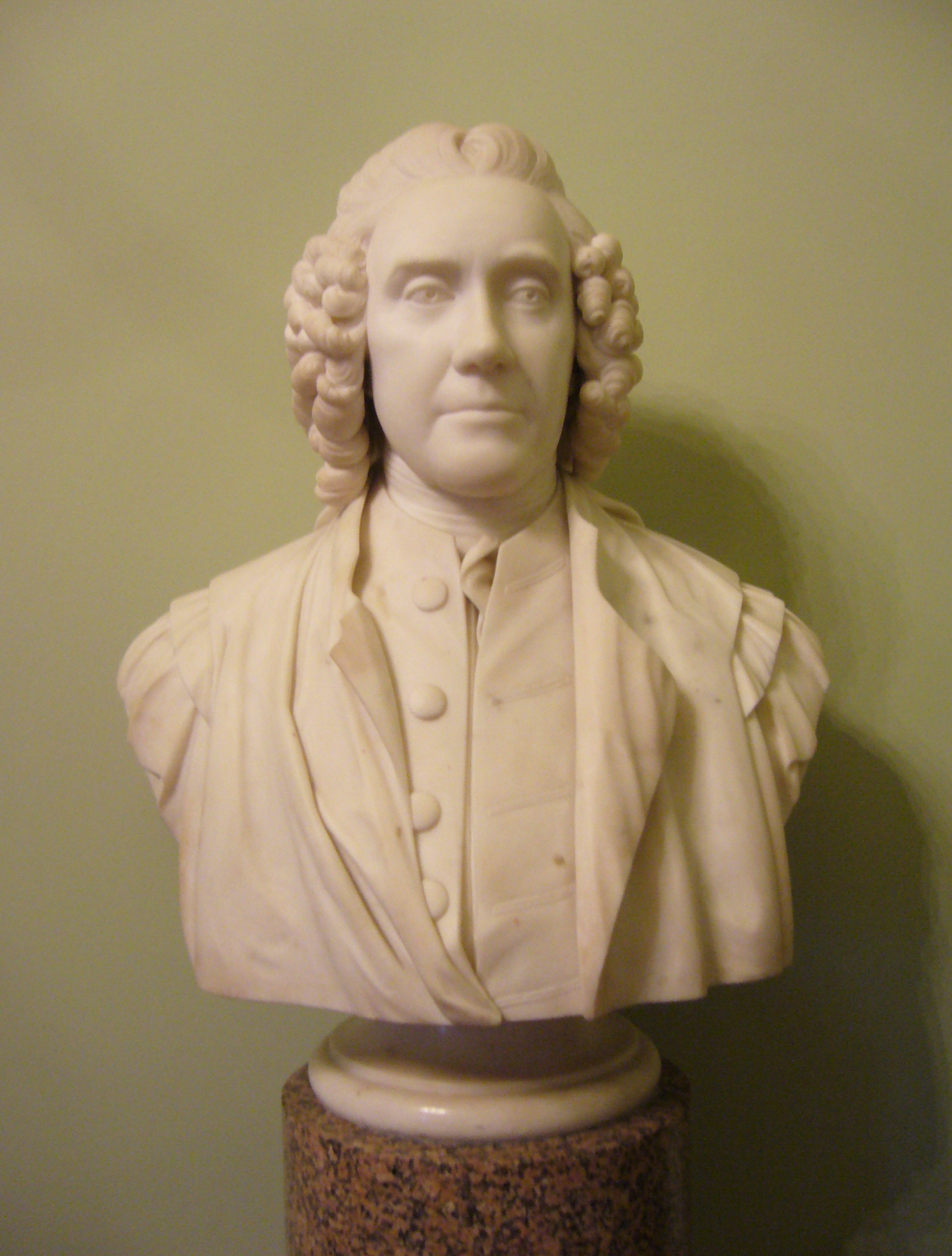
Bust of Alexander Monro in Edinburgh's Old College

Although the University of Edinburgh's Faculty of Medicine was not formally organised until 1726, medicine had been taught at Edinburgh since the beginning of the sixteenth century. Its formation was dependent on the incorporation of the Surgeons and Barber Surgeons, in 1505 and the foundation of the Royal College of Physicians of Edinburgh in 1681.

The university was modelled on the University of Bologna, but medical teaching was based on that of the sixteenth century University of Padua, and later on the University of Leiden (where most of the founding faculty had studied) in an attempt to attract foreign students, and maintain potential Scottish students in Scotland.

Since the Renaissance the primary facet of medical teaching here was anatomy and, therefore, Alexander Monro primus was appointed Professor of Anatomy in 1720. Later his son and grandson (both of the same name) would hold the position, establishing a reign of Professor Alexander Monros lasting 128 years. In subsequent years four further chairs completed the faculty allowing it to grant the qualification of Doctor of Medicine (MD) without the assistance of the Royal College of Physicians.

Success in the teaching of medicine and surgery through the eighteenth century was achieved thanks to the first teaching hospital, town physicians and the town guild of Barber Surgeons (later to become the Royal College of Surgeons of Edinburgh). By 1764 the number of medical students was so great that a new 200-seat Anatomy Theatre was built in the College Garden. Throughout the 18th century until the First World War the Edinburgh Medical School was widely considered the best medical school in the English speaking world.

=== Royal Infirmary of Edinburgh ===
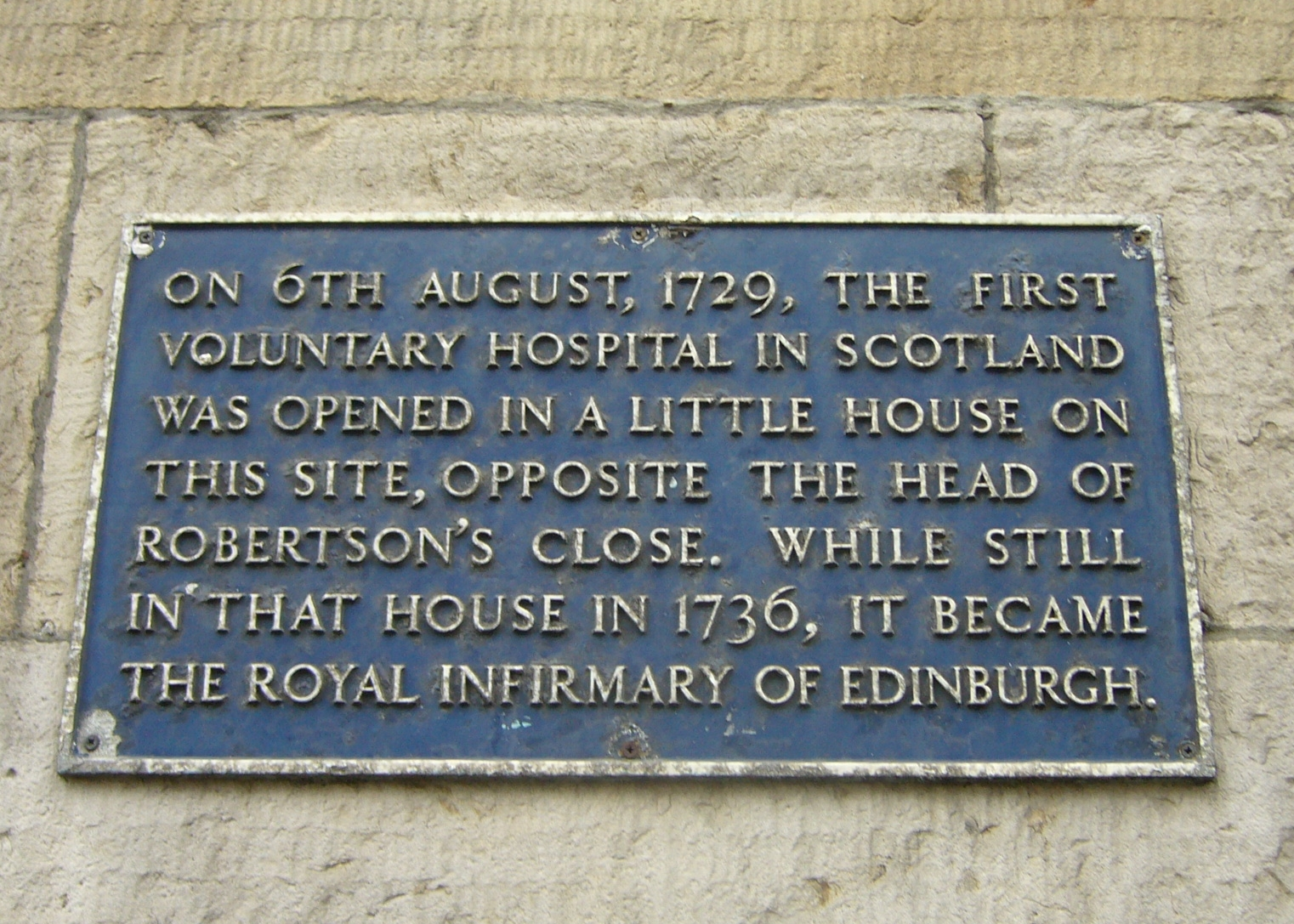
Plaque on the site of the first Royal Infirmary

The first voluntary hospital to be established in Scotland was the Edinburgh Infirmary for the Sick Poor, which was established both for charitable and teaching purposes. The project was led by Alexander Monro, supported by influential Edinburgh politician George Drummond who was keen to establish Edinburgh as a centre for medical excellence. The Royal College of Physicians conducted a fundraising appeal, attracting £2000 for the hospital by 1728.

The Edinburgh Royal Infirmary began operating from a small house—leased from the University of Edinburgh—which was located opposite the head of Robertson's Close, in today's Infirmary Street. Resident staff included a matron, one domestic servant, and volunteer physicians and surgeons who attended in fortnightly rotations. Only four beds were available from 6 August 1729 and medical students' visits were limited to two tickets only per student (to prevent crowding).

Work began in 1738 with William Adam as architect and in 1741, shortly after the foundation of the college, a 228-bed purpose-built hospital opened on land in what would become Infirmary Street, near Surgeons' Hall in Edinburgh. In addition to medical and surgical wards this new hospital included cells for lunatic patients and surgical operation theatre seats for 200 students.

In the 1950s the university's general practice teaching unit was developed. It became the world's first independent department of General Practice.

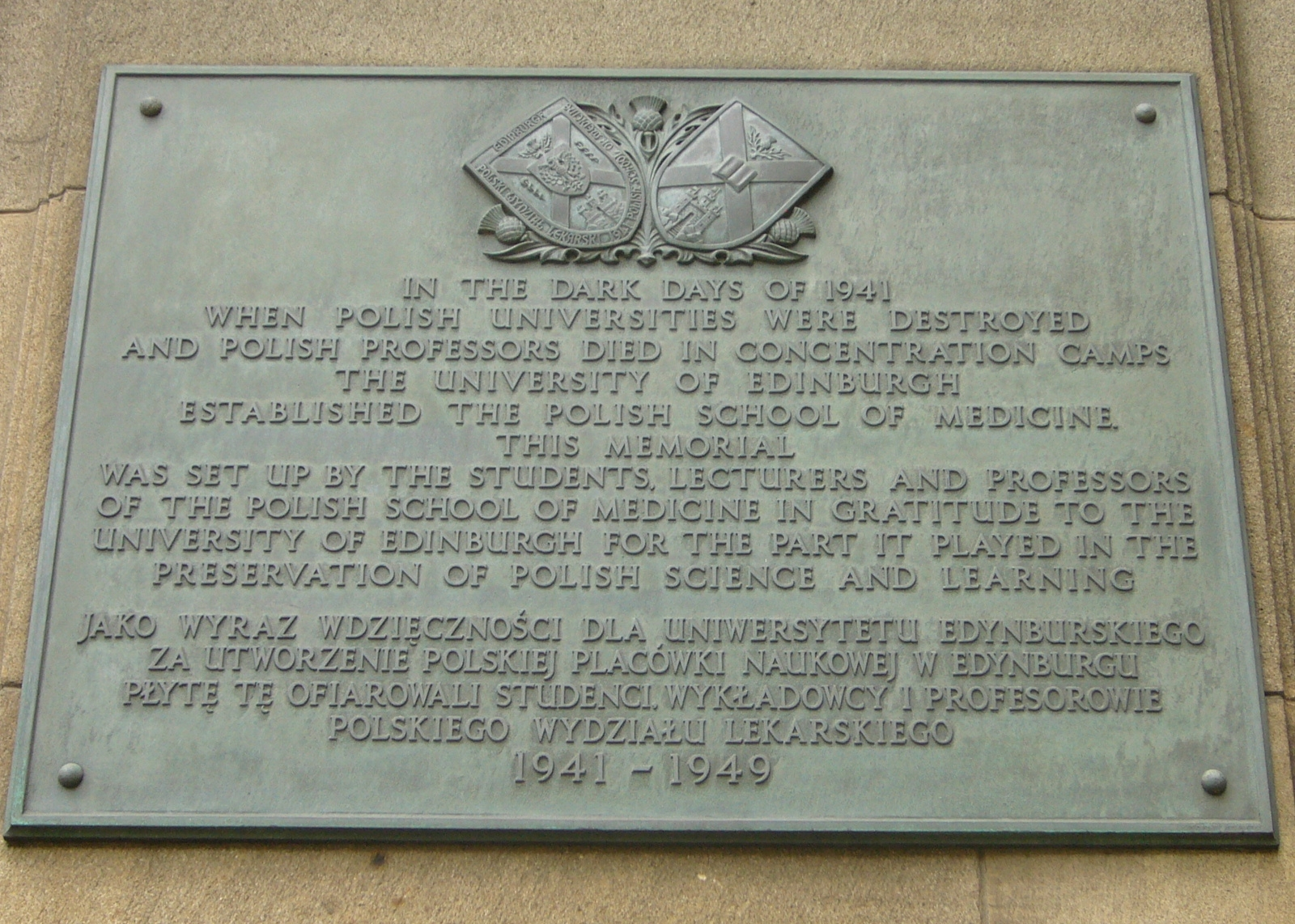
Polish School of Medicine plaque

The Polish School of Medicine was established in 1941 as "a wartime testament to this spirit of enlightenment". Students were to be those drawn from the Polish army to Britain and were taught in Polish. Classes in pre-clinical subjects were held at the Medical School. Clinical teaching was carried out mainly at the Royal Infirmary of Edinburgh in Lauriston Place. Former nurses' quarters in the grounds of the Western General were designated The Paderewski Hospital and used to provide care for members of the Polish armed forces and Polish civilians.

The school was closed in September 1950. 336 students matriculated, of which 227 students graduated with the equivalent of an MBChB. A total of 19 doctors obtained a doctorate or MD. A bronze plaque commemorating the existence of the Polish School of Medicine is located in the Quadrangle of the Medical School in Teviot Place.

=== 21st century ===
In 2013, there were 2150 Home/EU applications for 190 Home/EU positions leading to an applicant to place ratio of 11 to 1. In addition, there were 715 overseas applications for 17 international spots, an applicant to place ratio of 42 to 1.

In 2024, admissions to study medicine varies depending on the domicile of the applicant, with an offer rate of 68% (Scotland), 32% (rest of the UK and Ireland), and 8% (Overseas) for the 2023-24 admissions cycle. The yield rate, the percentage of people who are accepted who choose to attend, is 71%. The school requires the 4th highest entry grades in the UK according to the Guardian University Guide 2025. The head of the medical since 2022 has been David Argyle.

As of 2024, the school accepts 245 medical students per year from the United Kingdom and 20 students from around the world, including the European Union, the United States, and Canada. In addition, the school has partnerships with the medical schools of the universities of Oxford, Cambridge, and St Andrews. This allows students from Oxford, Cambridge, and St Andrews to complete their bachelor's degree at their respective institution and obtain their medical degree and clinical training at the University of Edinburgh.

The medical school in 2025 was ranked 5th by the Complete University Guide, 6th in the UK by The Guardian University Guide, and 7th by The Times University Guide. It also ranked 21st in the world by both the Times Higher Education World University Rankings and the QS World University Rankings in the same year. According to a Healthcare Survey run by Saga in 2006, the medical school's main teaching hospital, the Royal Infirmary of Edinburgh, was considered the best hospital in Scotland.

== Edinburgh Model ==
The Edinburgh Model was a model of medical teaching developed by the University of Edinburgh in the 18th century and widely emulated around the world including at the University of Pennsylvania Perelman School of Medicine and the McGill University Faculty of Medicine. It was a two-tiered education model, revolutionary and well suited to the medical system of the UK at the time. First, the model offered its students studies in all branches of science, not just medicine. According to Mary Hewson, "every branch of science was regularly taught, and drawn together so compactly from one to the other." Edinburgh offered the most extensive selection of courses in any university in Britain.

Furthermore, it had a two-tiered education model which allowed a great number of students to matriculate, but allowed few to graduate. Students had to attend all lectures with the exception of midwifery (although it was strongly encouraged nonetheless), they had to study for at minimum 3 years, had to write a series of oral and written examinations in Latin and had to compose a Latin thesis and defend it before the whole faculty. Consequently, the majority of students attended Edinburgh with the intention of learning medicine for 1 year before leaving due to the costs of a degree and the fact that an MD degree was not required to practice medicine. Between 1765 and 1825, only 20% of Edinburgh students graduated with an MD.

Later on this Edinburgh Model developed into a more formal university medical education curriculum, which was spread around the world by its graduates. In 1825, the years of medical education increased from three to four years and in 1833, English replaced Latin as the language of examination.

== Royal Medical Society ==
The Royal Medical Society, the medical student society at the University of Edinburgh, is the oldest medical society in the UK, founded in 1734. It became known as 'the Royal Medical Society' from 1778 after it was awarded a Royal Charter, and remains the only student society in the UK to hold one. It owns its own premises including a historical library, meeting hall, computer suite, lounge, kitchen and clinical skills resource centre. The Society was vital to the flourishing reputation of the Medical School through a network of distinguished members and teachers, and its atmosphere of open-minded, forward-thinking debate, tradition and social bonds.

To this day, the Society promotes its values of educational advancement through a wide variety of talks, tutorials and a national conference. It also runs a variety of social events including the infamous White Coat Pub Crawl during Freshers' Week, pub quizzes, a Burns Supper and the Presidents' Annual Dinner in the Royal College of Surgeons. Members are entitled to apply for grants to fund their medical electives, managed by the RMS Trust, which is a registered charitable body. The Society is run by a Council of student members and two permanent secretaries.

== Overseas ties ==
The Edinburgh Medical School has strong ties to North America: graduates of the school went on to found five out of the seven Ivy League medical schools, namely those of Pennsylvania, Yale, Columbia, Harvard and Dartmouth.

The McGill University Medical School in Montreal and the University of Pennsylvania School of Medicine were modelled after Edinburgh by Edinburgh graduates. Graduates became senators, representatives and participated in the American Revolutionary War. A great number of the early presidential physicians and surgeons general were trained at Edinburgh. The school runs the Scottish-Canadian Medical Programme jointly with the University of St Andrews School of Medicine and the University of Alberta Faculty of Medicine and Dentistry for Canadian students.

== People ==
=== Faculty ===
List only includes faculty who were not graduates of the medical school. Faculty that were also graduates of the medical school are listed under alumni.

Name	Department	Notability	Reference
Robert Sibbald	Prof. of Medicine 1685–1722	Scottish physician, first described the blue whale, founder of the Royal College of Physicians of Edinburgh	
John Rutherford	Prof. of Practice of Medicine 1726–1765	Scottish physician, first to introduce clinical teaching in Edinburgh known as the "Edinburgh method"	
William Cullen	Prof. of Chemistry and Medicine 1755–1766, Prof. of Institutes of Medicine 1766–1773, Prof. of Medicine 1773–1790	Scottish physician, first demonstrated artificial refrigeration, founder of the Glasgow Medical School, advocate of holistic medical consultation	
Tristan Nichol	Prof. of Chemistry and Medicine 1825-1835,	Scottish physician, introduced Charles Darwin to biology, created a chart to display the varying sizes of the primary chancre in syphilis.	
James Syme	Regius Chair of Clinical Surgery 1833–1848, FRCS(Edin) 1823,	Scottish surgeon, invented a technique for waterproofing fabrics, conducted the first exarticulation of the hip, known for Syme's amputation	
Douglas Argyll Robertson	Lecturer 1860–1893, Consultant Ophthalmologist 1870–1897	Scottish ophthalmologist, described the Argyll Robertson pupil a sign of neurosyphilis	
Sir William Turner	Prof. Anatomy 1867–1903, Principal of Edinburgh University 1903–1916	Scottish anatomist, President of the Anatomical Society of Great Britain and Ireland	
Joseph Lister	Regius Chair of Clinical Surgery 1869–1877, FRCS(Edin) 1855,	English surgeon, developed antiseptic surgery using carbolic acid to sterilise surgical instruments	
Edward Albert Sharpey-Schafer	Chair of Physiology 1883–1933	English physiologist, regarded as the founder of endocrinology, discovered adrenaline, coined the terms endocrine and insulin	
George Barger	Prof. Chemistry in Relation to Medicine 1919–1937,	British chemist, identified tyramine, contributed to the synthesis of thyroxine and Vitamin B1	
Vincent du Vigneaud	National Research Council Fellow 1928–1929,	American biochemist, discovered oxytocin, awarded the 1955 Nobel Prize in Chemistry	
John Gaddum	Chair of Materia Medica 1942–1958,	British pharmacologist, discovered Substance P, a neuropeptide	
James Learmonth	Regius Chair of Surgery 1939–1956,	Scottish surgeon, performed lumbar sympathectomy on King George VI to treat his vascular disease	
Alexander Fleming	Rector 1951–1954,	Scottish biologist, discovered penicillin, awarded the 1945 Nobel Prize in Physiology or Medicine	
John Crofton	Prof. Respiratory Disease and Tuberculosis 1952–1977, Dean of Medicine 1964–1966, Vice Principal of the University 1969–1970	British physician, pioneered the treatment of tuberculosis, which was known as the Edinburgh method.	
Michael Woodruff	Chair of Surgical Science 1957–1976,	British transplant surgeon, performed the first ever kidney transplant in the UK at the Edinburgh Royal Infirmary in 1960.	
John Forfar	Edward Clark Professor of Child Life and Health 1964–1983,	British paediatrician, President of the British Paediatric Association (1985–1988) and awarded the Military Cross during the Second World War	
Edwin Southern	Post-doctoral researcher MRC Mammalian Genome Unit 1967–1985	Developed the Southern blot, founder of Oxford Gene Technology, received the 2005 Lasker Award for Clinical Medical Research	
Robert Evan Kendell	Chair of Psychiatry 1973–1990, Dean of the College of Medicine and Veterinary Medicine 1990–1994	Welsh psychiatrist, Chief Medical Officer of Scotland from 1991 to 1996	
Richard G. Morris	Wolfson Professor of Neuroscience 1986–present, FRS 1997, CBE 2007	Scottish neuroscientist, developed the Morris water navigation task	
Andrew H. Wyllie	Prof. Experimental Pathology 1992–1998, FRS 1995,	Scottish pathologist, discovered the importance of programmed cell death and coined the term apoptosis	
Edvard Moser	Post-doctoral researcher 1994–1996,	Norwegian neuroscientist, discovered entorhinal grid cells, awarded the 2014 Nobel Prize in Physiology or Medicine	
May-Britt Moser	Post-doctoral researcher 1994–1996,	Norwegian neuroscientist, discovered entorhinal grid cells, awarded the 2014 Nobel Prize in Physiology or Medicine	
Adrian Bird	Buchanan Professor of Genetics 1990–present	Led the team that discovered CpG Islands and MECP2, received the 2016 Shaw Prize in Life Science and Medicine	
John Savill	Prof. Medicine 1998–present, Dean of the College of Medicine and Veterinary Medicine 2002–present	Scottish physician, CEO of the Medical Research Council 2010–present	
Sir Ian Wilmut	Prof. Emeritus 2006–2023, FRS(Edin) 2000	Scottish embryologist, first to clone a mammal, a Finn Dorset lamb named Dolly, received the 2008 Shaw Prize in Life Science and Medicine	
Jamie A. Davies	Chair of Experimental Anatomy 2007–present	British embryologist and synthetic biologist, first to grow a kidney from self-organizing stem cells	
Clare Blackburn	Chair of Tissue Stem Cell Biology 2011–present	British embryologist, first to grow a whole organ, a thymus, inside an animal	
Hilary Pinnock	Professor of Primary Care Respiratory Medicine	Work in remote care gained particular prominence during the 2019 COVID pandemic. The pandemic forced a dramatic shift towards remote care and telemedicine initiatives	
