= William Weipers =

Scottish veterinarian

Sir William Lee Weipers, FRCVS FRSE (1904–1990) was a Scottish veterinary surgeon and educator. Glasgow University's Weiper Memorial Lecture is named in his honour as is the Weipers Centre for Equine Welfare. He was President of the Royal College of Veterinary Surgeons for the period 1963/64.

== Life ==
Weipers was born in 1904 in the manse at Kilbirnie in Ayrshire the son of Rev John Weipers, and his wife, Evelyn Bovele Lee. Soon after he was born his father moved to the Gillespie United Free Church of Scotland in Glasgow. The family then lived at 182 Whitehill Street.

William was educated at Dennistoun Primary School then at Whitehill Secondary School in Glasgow, and went on to graduate MRCVS from the Glasgow Veterinary College in 1925. He went into general practice from 1925 until 1949, apart from a period of two years (1927 to 1929) when he became a member of staff of the Royal (Dick) Veterinary College in Edinburgh. A pioneering veterinary surgeon in the field of small animals, he introduced closed circuit anaesthesia to veterinary practice and was known for small animal orthopaedics.

When the various private veterinary colleges were brought into the control of the university system, Weipers was made the first Director of Veterinary Education at the University of Glasgow (1949–1974). He was also Professor of Veterinary Surgery from 1951 to 1974, and the Dean of the Glasgow Veterinary Faculty from 1969 until 1974. He supported the creation of a veterinary school which became renowned for teaching and research.

In 1953 he was elected a Fellow of the Royal Society of Edinburgh. His proposers were Norman Davidson, Robert Campbell Garry, William McGregor Mitchell and George Montgomery.

Among the students taught by Weipers were James W. Black and veterinarians such as Sir James Armour, Professor WFH Jarrett FRS, Professor RJ Roberts FRSE and Professor M Murray FRSE. All of them presented the Weipers Memorial Lecture, a biennial talk at the University of Glasgow.

On his retirement Weipers devoted time to arboriculture but also played a role in the establishment of academic aquaculture, as chairman of the management committee of the Nuffield Institute of Aquaculture, at the University of Stirling. For this work he was awarded an honorary doctorate (LLD) by the University of Stirling in 1978. He was later awarded the honorary degree of Doctor of Veterinary Medicine and Surgery by his alma mater (1982).

Weipers died on 15 December 1990 at the age of 86.

== Awards and honours ==
Weipers was knighted by Queen Elizabeth II in 1966 for his services to Veterinary education.

In 1973 he was presented with the Blaine award by the British Small Animal Veterinary Association at their sixteenth annual conference in London.

== Family ==
In 1939 he married Mary MacLean, a Gaelic-speaking veterinary graduate from Barra who died in 1984.

They had one daughter, Janet Weipers.
