= In Practice =

Publication published in conjunction with The Veterinary Record

- Discipline: Veterinary medicine
- Language: English
- Edited by: Alexander Trees, Baron Trees

Publication details
- History: 1979-present
- Publisher: BVA Publications, BMJ Group (United Kingdom)
- Frequency: 10/year
- Impact factor: 0.176 (2017)

Standard abbreviations
- ISO 4: In Pract.

Indexing
- CODEN: IPRCDH
- ISSN: 0263-841X
- OCLC no.: 04752211

Links
- Journal homepage; Online access; Online archive

In Practice is a publication published in conjunction with The Veterinary Record and provides continuing educational material for veterinary practitioners. It focuses on the topics of clinical and practice management. Reviews cover all species, but principally farm and companion animals, providing a regular update on clinical developments. The journal is published 10 times a year by BVA Publications in collaboration with the BMJ Group.

== Citations ==
According to the 2008 Journal Citation Reports, the five journals that have cited In Practice most often are (in order of citation descending citation frequency) The Veterinary Record, Journal of Small Animal Practice, Journal of Veterinary Internal Medicine, Journal of the American Veterinary Medical Association, and In Practice itself. As of 2008 the five journals that have been cited the most frequently by articles published in In Practice are The Veterinary Record, Journal of Small Animal Practitioners, Journal of Veterinary Internal Medicine, Journal of the American Veterinary Medical Association, and In Practice itself. According to the Journal Citation Reports, the journal has a 2017 impact factor of 0.176.
