= Hilary Pinnock =

Hilary Pinnock is a researcher and teacher in respiratory medicine and global health with a focus on delivery of family and remote care including implementing supported self-management for asthma, remote consulting and digital health for respiratory disease.

== Career ==
Hilary Pinnock has a background as a family physician and is Professor of Primary Care Respiratory Medicine at the University of Edinburgh. As of 2026, she is Chairman of the Primary Care Group of the Research Network of the European Respiratory Society (ERS). and is Chairman of the Education sub-committee and member of The International Primary Care Respiratory Group (IPCRG), a clinically led non-governmental organisation working in primary care and respiratory health.

Pinnock's work in remote care gained prominence during the 2019 COVID pandemic. The pandemic forced a dramatic shift towards remote care and telemedicine initiatives.

Her work includes the IMP2ART programme developing and evaluating implementation strategies that support asthma self-management in routine care, and the Telescot programme supporting the development of healthcare monitoring programmes in Scotland.
