= College of Medicine and Veterinary Medicine, University of Edinburgh =

Coordinates: 55.9440°N 3.1895°W

College of Medicine and Veterinary Medicine
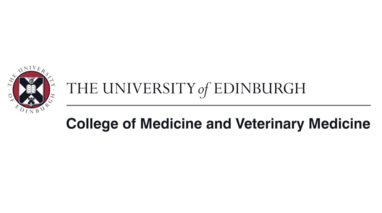
- Established: 2002
- Head of College: David Argyle
- Location: Edinburgh, Scotland
- Website: www.ed.ac.uk/medicine-vet-medicine

The College of Medicine and Veterinary Medicine is one of the three colleges of the University of Edinburgh.

== Structure ==
The College of Medicine and Veterinary Medicine is composed of two schools, with subgroups and research institutes included under them:

- Royal (Dick) School of Veterinary Studies
- Edinburgh Medical School
  - Edinburgh Medical School: Biomedical Sciences
    - Biomedical Teaching Organisation
    - Centre for Cognitive and Neural Systems
    - Centre for Integrative Physiology
    - Centre for Neuroregeneration
    - Division of Infection and Pathway Medicine
  - Edinburgh Medical School: Clinical Sciences
    - BHF Centre for Cardiovascular Sciences
    - Centre for Clinical Brain Sciences
    - MRC Centre for Inflammation Research
    - Scottish Centre for Regenerative Medicine
    - Centre for Reproductive Health
    - Edinburgh Postgraduate Dental Institute
    - Division of Health Sciences
  - Edinburgh Medical School: Molecular, Genetic and Population Health Sciences
    - MRC Institute of Genetics and Molecular Medicine
      - Edinburgh Cancer Research Centre
    - Usher Institute of Population Health Sciences and Informatics
    - Edinburgh Clinical Trials Unit
    - Division of Pathology
