= Albert Edward Mettam =

Irish veterinarian and university principal and professor

- Born: 1867
- Died: 27 November 1917 (aged 49–50)
- Resting place: Dean's Grange Cemetery, Dublin
- Education: Royal (Dick) Veterinary College
- Children: 3
- Scientific career
- Workplaces: Royal (Dick) Veterinary College, Royal Veterinary College of Ireland.

Albert Edward Mettam MRCVS, MRIA (1867 – 27 November 1917), was inaugural Principal of the Royal Veterinary College of Ireland in Dublin. He went there from the Royal (Dick) Veterinary College where he had been Professor of Anatomy and Histology from 1892.

== Early life and education ==
Albert E. Mettam was born in Ordsall, Nottinghamshire, to Ann and Richard Mettam, a builder. He qualified at the R(D)VC on 28 May 1889 where he was awarded the Royal College of Veterinary Surgeons (RCVS) Fitzwygram prize for that year.

== Career ==
He was in general veterinary practice in Retford, Nottinghamshire. He succeeded his friend and colleague, John McFadyean, as Professor of Anatomy and Histology at the R(D)VC in 1892. In 1900 he was appointed as the first Principal of the Royal Veterinary College of Ireland at its new premises in Pembroke Road, Dublin. He was editor of the Veterinarian from 1895 until its last edition 1902 and held the George Heriot Research Fellowship in Science in the University of Edinburgh. Elected President of the RVCS in 1911. He was acknowledged for contributions to embryology and the anatomy of the limbs of the horse and domestic ruminants. With McFadyean and Stockman he was involved in the first experiments to develop the ‘TB’ test in Great Britain.

=== Life in Ireland ===
In 1911 he was made Lieutenant in the Officer Training Corps (RVCI) and then was promoted to the rank of Provisional Major. The OTC cadets were veterinary students who visited the sick lines of the army veterinary hospitals.

Mettam had a dramatic experience in Dublin in April 1916 during the Easter Rising. The rebels attacked Trinity College Botanic Gardens which was next to Mettam's house and the army, thinking that shots had come from the Principal's house, fired into it, and then entered the house taking Mettam prisoner, he was handcuffed and jailed along with the rebels. He was released, the next day but, in the view of some colleagues, he never fully recovered from the experience.

== Death ==
Mettam died from pernicious anaemia on 27 November 1917, aged 50. At his funeral all the students of the RVC, Ireland marched from the college to the church and on to the graveside. His death left his wife and family in financial difficulties, but the RCVS and colleagues petitioned the government and obtained a pension for them.

== Accolades ==
- Fitzwygram prize winner, 1889.
- Professor of Anatomy and Histology, The Royal (Dick) Veterinary College (R(D)VC), 1892–1900.
- George Heriot Research Fellowship in Science, University of Edinburgh, appointed 1895.
- Editor: The Veterinarian, 1895–1902.
- John Henry Steel Memorial Medal of The Royal College of Veterinary Surgeons (RCVS), 1900.
- Principal of Royal Veterinary College of Ireland, Dublin (RVC, Ireland), 1900–1917.
- Professor of Bacteriology and Pathology, RVC, Ireland, 1900–1917.
- Vice President of RCVS: 1903, 1904, 1907, 1910 and 1913.
- President RCVS, 1911–13.
- President of The Scottish Microscopical Society (dates required).
- Examiner: National University of Ireland, University of London, University of Manchester.

== Publications ==
- Mettam, A.E. (1892) J. Comp. Pathology and Therapeutics 5: 42-48 An interesting abnormality in a foetal lamb.
- Mettam, A.E. (1895) J. Anat. Physiol 29: 244-253 Rudimentary metacarpal and metacarpal bones of the Domestic Ruminants.
- Mettam, A.E. (1897) Veterinarian 70: 627-634 On repair of nerves.
- Mettam, A.E. (1899) Veterinarian 72: 149-161 Roaring: an analysis and a synthesis.
- Mettam, A.E. (1905) J Hyg. (Lond) 5: 271-273 A Note on Bovine Piroplasmosis.
- Mettam A.E. (1909) Tuberculosis in the lower animals. In: Aberdeen I, editor. Ireland's crusade against tuberculosis. Vol III: Objects of assault. Dublin: Maunsel & Co Ltd; p. 13-30.
- Mettam, A.E. (1915) Proc. tenth Int. Vet. Congress: 105-138 Foot and mouth disease.
