= Frank Alexander (veterinary surgeon) =

English veterinarian

Frank Alexander FRSE MRCVS (18 March 1917 – 4 March 1998) was an English veterinarian who served as Dean of the Dick Vet School, Edinburgh from 1970 to 1974.

== Life ==
Alexander was born on 18 March 1917, the son of Sydney Alexander in New Mills, Cheshire (now part of Derbyshire). He was educated at Furness Vale Primary School then Buxton College from 1927 to 1935. In 1935, he began studies at the Dick Vet school in Edinburgh.

In 1940, Alexander was elected a Member of the Royal College of Veterinary Surgeons. He then undertook a postgraduate degree in Pharmacology at the University of Edinburgh funded by the Agricultural Research Council, under Alfred Joseph Clark. His PhD thesis was one of the world's first studies on pharmacokinetics (January 1944). Clark died during his supervision of Alexander and was replaced by Sir John Gaddum.

In February 1944, during the World War II Alexander joined the Royal Army Veterinary Corps and served in the Middle East. In 1945 this placed him to take on the chair in Pharmacology at the American University of Beirut in Lebanon. In 1947 he returned to the UK and the Dick Vet School to study the physiology of the equine digestive system. He also did work for the Rowett Research Institute in Aberdeen under Sir David Cuthbertson. In 1952, he was appointed Senior Lecturer in Veterinary Pharmacology at the Dick Vet, which by then was part of the University of Edinburgh.

In 1961, Alexander was elected a Fellow of the Royal Society of Edinburgh. In 1968 Alexander was made Professor of Veterinary Pharmacology at the University of Edinburgh. He delivered the Sir Frederick Smith Lecture for that year. In 1970 he was promoted to Dean of the Veterinary Faculty at the University, then based at Summerhall, replacing Alexander Robertson.

Alexander retired in 1984 and was succeeded as Dean by Ainsley Iggo. He died in Edinburgh on 4 March 1998 aged 80.

== Publications ==
- Experimental Study on the Digestive Tract of the Horse (1954)
- An Introduction to Veterinary Pharmacology (1960)

== Artistic recognition ==
Alexander was one of twenty "shadow portraits" created in the Summerhall building of the college, depicting former Principals. The portraits are now in the Easter Bush buildings.

== Family ==
He was married to Peggy Reedie (d. 1984). They had no children.
