= John McFadyean =

Scottish veterinary surgeon

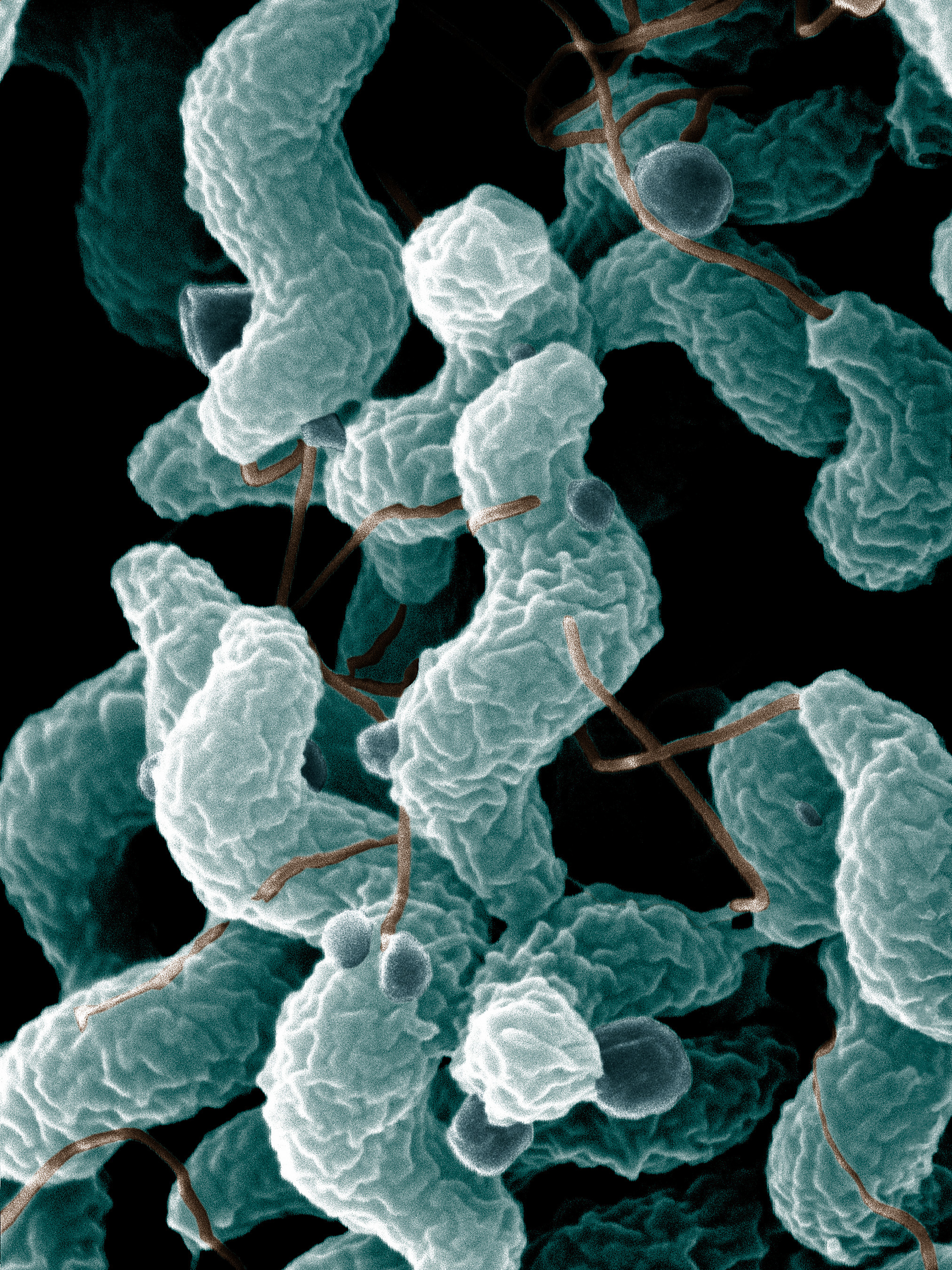
Campylobacter

Sir John McFadyean (1853–1941) was a Scottish veterinary surgeon and Professor of Veterinary Science. He was Principal of (and a Professor at) the Royal Veterinary College from 1894 to 1927.

In 1906, he was the first person to isolate the Campylobacter species of bacteria, and due to this made major advances in public health.

== Life ==
He was born in Barrachan in Wigtownshire on 17 June 1853, the son of Andrew McFadyean. He was educated at the Ewart Institute in Newton Stewart.

For the first few years after leaving school he worked on his father's farm but in October 1874 he entered the Dick Veterinary College in Edinburgh from whence he graduated in April 1876. He was appointed Lecturer in Anatomy at the college in the following academic year. He lodged at the college at 8 Clyde Street (now the site of Edinburgh's main bus station).

In the 1880s his interests became fixed on bacteriology and pathology and the subsequent sections of comparative anatomy were never completed. He became the first British veterinary bacteriologist and he retained that position throughout his life. In 1888 he was elected a Fellow of the Royal Society of Edinburgh. His proposers were Andrew Douglas Maclagan, Alexander Crum Brown, Alexander Buchan, and Sir German Sims Woodhead.

In 1892 he was appointed a lecturer at the Royal Veterinary College in London. He rose rapidly, becoming Principal of the college in 1894.

He was knighted by King Edward VII in 1905.

He retired in 1927 and died in London on 1 February 1941. The McFadyean building at the Royal Veterinary College (which today houses the London BioScience Innovation Centre) was named in his honour.

== Publications ==
- The Anatomy of the Horse (1884) (reprinted 1902)
- The Osteology and Arthrology of Domesticated Animals (1887)

In 1888 he originated the "Journal of Comparative Pathology and Therapeutics" which he edited until the outbreak of the Second World War.

== Family ==
In 1883 he married Mara Eleanor Walley (d.1929), eldest daughter of Thomas Walley (1842-1894), Principal of the Dick Vet school in Edinburgh from 1874 to 1894.

His son, Sir Andrew McFadyean was knighted by King George V in 1925 for his work in the diplomatic service.

His daughter Ethel McFadyean married Sir Stewart Stockman, brother of Ralph Stockman.
