= Robert Stewart MacDougall =

Scottish scientist and author

Robert Stewart MacDougall FRSE LLD (5 June 1862 – 28 March 1947) was a Scottish entomologist, agriculturalist and zoologist. In authorship he appears as R. S. MacDougall.

== Life ==
MacDougall was born in Edinburgh on 5 June 1862. He was educated at George Heriot's School then studied sciences at the University of Edinburgh graduating with an MA. He then began lecturing in Agricultural and Forest Zoology at the University of Edinburgh, before taking on the post of Professor of Biology at the Royal Dick Veterinary College in south Edinburgh.

In 1901 he was elected a Fellow of the Royal Society of Edinburgh. His proposers were Sir Isaac Bayley Balfour, James Cossar Ewart, Sir Francis Grant Ogilvie and Ramsay Heatley Traquair.

In the 1930s he lived at Ivy Lodge between Gullane and Dirleton in East Lothian. He died in Edinburgh on 28 March 1947.

== Family ==
He was married to Eliza Henrietta (“Lillie”) Huie (1862-1930). He remarried in 1936 to Kathleen Sussan.

== Publications ==
- Gall-Gnats Injurious to Osiers and Willows (1905)
- The Large Larch Sawfly (1906)
