= Ainsley Iggo =

New Zealand-born neurophysiologist

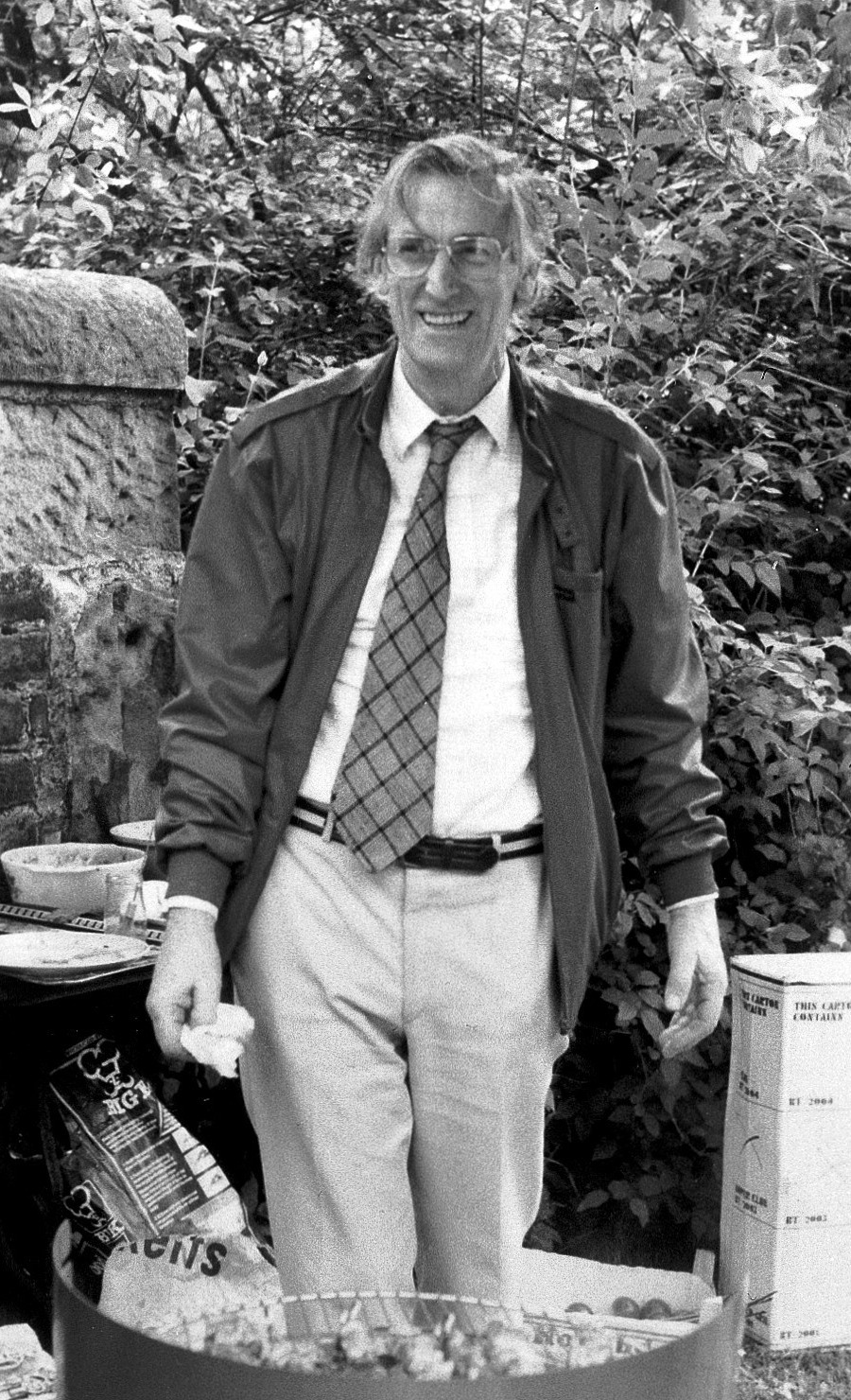
- Ainsley Iggo in 1990
- Education: University of New Zealand; University of Otago; University of Aberdeen
- Scientific career
- Fields: neurophysiology

Ainsley Iggo FRS (2 August 1924 – 25 March 2012) was a New Zealand born neurophysiologist.

== Life ==
He was born in Napier, New Zealand and studied at a farming college in Invercargill, before moving to Agricultural Sciences at the University of New Zealand. He was awarded a research scholarship to continue his studies in Britain. After gaining a BSc and an MSc in electrophysiology and neuroscience at the University of Otago in Dunedin, with a thesis on rumen digestion in sheep, he moved to Aberdeen to join the Rowett Research Institute, an agricultural research facility of the University of Aberdeen. There he was awarded a PhD for his studies on the vagus nerve of sheep.

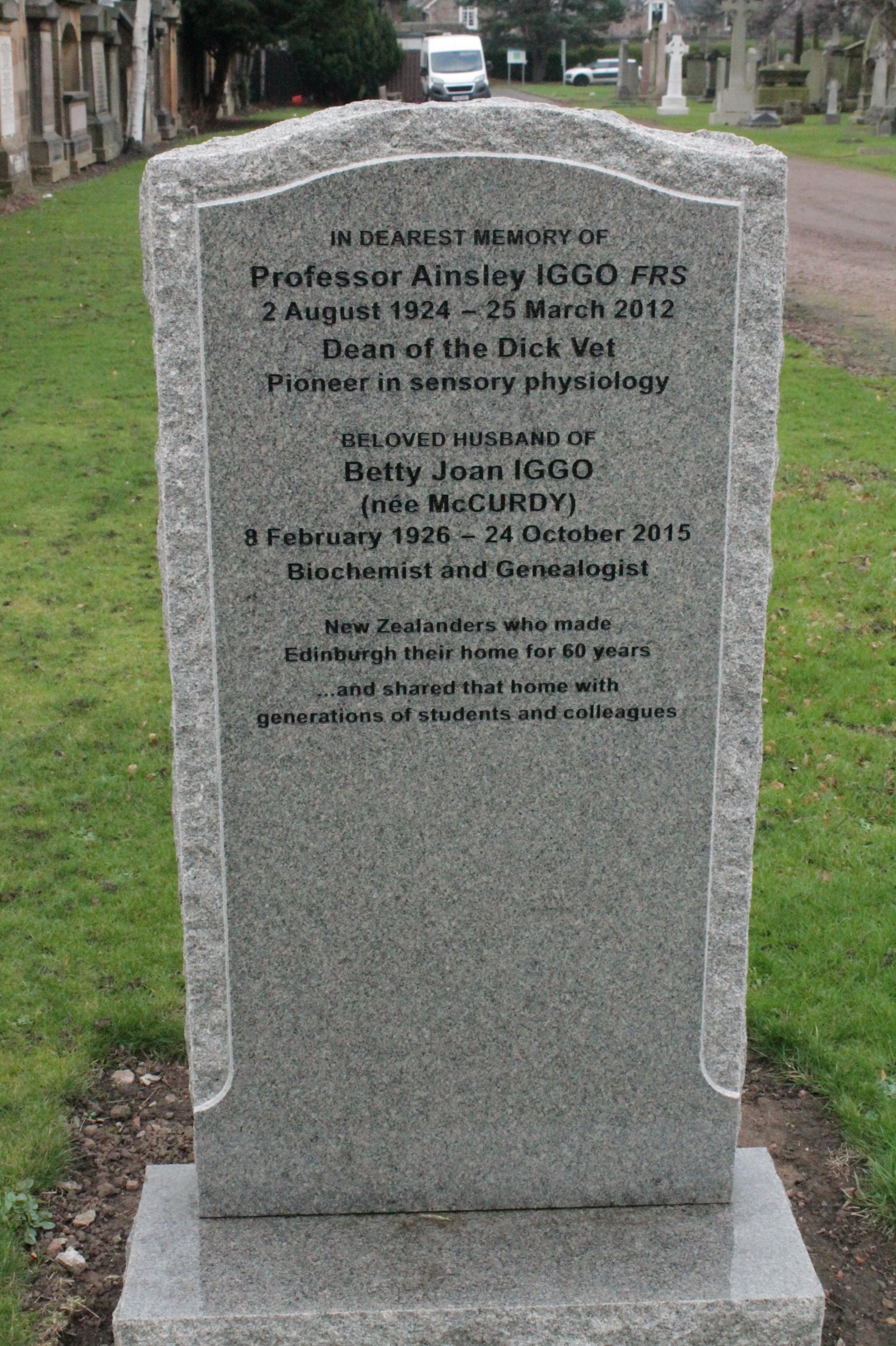
The grave of Prof Ainsley Iggo, Grange Cemetery

He moved to Edinburgh in 1954, where he began as a lecturer in physiology at the Medical School of the University of Edinburgh before accepting the Chair of Veterinary Physiology at the Royal (Dick) School of Veterinary Studies of the University of Edinburgh in 1962. He played the major role in getting the School international recognition, before becoming dean of the School. He remained as professor emeritus of veterinary physiology until his death. Iggo received a DSc from the University of Edinburgh in 1963 for his thesis, “Mammalian afferent nerve fibres".

In 1973, he was a founder member and later president (1981–84) of the International Association for the Study of Pain (IASP). He was elected a Fellow of the Royal Society in 1978 and a Fellow of the Royal Society of Edinburgh.

In 1974, he succeeded Prof Frank Alexander as Dean of the Dick Vet. He was succeeded in turn in 1977 by Prof Ian Beattie. He was brought back for a second term as Dean from 1985 to 1990.

He died in Edinburgh on 25 March 2012. He is buried in Grange Cemetery in south Edinburgh. The grave lies midway along the north path on its north side.

== Family ==
In 1952, he married New Zealand biochemist Betty Joan McCurdy (1926–2015), and together they had 3 sons.
