= Keith Dyce =

British veterinarian

Keith Dyce DVM&S
- Born: Keith Macfarlane Dyce; 24 June 1926; Edinburgh, Scotland
- Died: 12 January 2014 (aged 87); St Columba's Hospice, Edinburgh, Scotland
- Resting place: Warriston Crematorium
- Education: University of Edinburgh, Dick Vet School, Royal Veterinary College
- Occupation: veterinarian
- Known for: expert on dog anatomy
- Notable work: Dean of the Dick Vet School
- Children: 1 son, 2 grandsons

Keith Macfarlane Dyce, DVM&S (1926–2014) was a 20th-century British veterinarian who served as Dean of the Dick Vet School from 1980 to 1984. He was an expert on dog anatomy.

== Life ==
Dyce was born in Edinburgh on 24 June 1926. He studied science at the University of Edinburgh then trained as a vet at the Dick Vet School in Edinburgh graduating with a BSc in 1947. He then lectured in the anatomy department at the Royal Veterinary College in London, gaining a doctorate (DVM&S) in 1958.

In the academic year 1965/66 he was visiting Professor of Dog Anatomy at Cornell University in the US. In 1967 he became Professor of Veterinary Anatomy at the University of Utrecht in the Netherlands. In 1974 he returned to Edinburgh as Professor of Anatomy at the Dick Vet, and in 1980 he became Dean of Faculty succeeding Professor Ian Beattie.

Dyce was married for almost 60 years, and had a son and two grandsons. He retired in 1984, and continued writing and contributing to veterinary medicine. In 2009 the fourth edition of his textbook was published, which he had written in his 80s. He died at St Columba's Hospice on 12 January 2014, surrounded by his family. He was cremated at Warriston Crematorium.

== Publications ==
- Textbook of Veterinary Anatomy – at least four editions – with Wolfgang Sack and C. J. G. Wensing
- Essentials of Bovine Anatomy (1971 – with Wensing)

== Artistic recognition ==
Dyce was one of 20 "shadow portraits" created in the Summerhall building of the college, depicting former Principals. The portraits are now in the Easter Bush buildings.
