= Lisa Boden =

British academic

Lisa Boden MANZCVS MRCVS
- Education: Dartmouth College, University of Queensland, University of Glasgow, University of Edinburgh, University of Melbourne
- Occupation: Head of the Royal (Dick) School of Veterinary Studies
- Employer: University of Edinburgh

Lisa Boden is a professional in the field of veterinary public health and population medicine. She holds a Ph.D. in veterinary epidemiology, complemented by a Master of Laws degree in medical law and ethics. Recognized as a veterinary specialist by the Royal College of Veterinary Surgeons (RCVS) in the United Kingdom, she also holds European certification.

== Career ==
Currently, Boden is a Professor and holds a Personal Chair in Population Medicine and Veterinary Public Health Policy at the Royal (Dick) School of Veterinary Studies at the University of Edinburgh. Moreover, she holds the position of co- Director of Policy and Impact at EPIC (the Scottish Government's Centre for Expertise in Animal Disease Outbreaks). EPIC provides policymakers with access to emergency scientific advice and analysis, empowering them to prepare for and respond to unprecedented outbreaks of exotic and novel animal diseases.

Boden's professional pursuits encompass a wide range of activities. She translates and communicates scientific knowledge, ensuring its ethical application as evidence for policymaking. Her expertise extends to contingency planning and emergency response and management during outbreaks. Additionally, Boden contributes her skills in risk assessment and communication, enabling stakeholders to make informed decisions. She also engages in horizon scanning and scenario planning, fostering strategic thinking regarding disease risk and long-term resilience in the face of potential outbreaks. Boden founded the One Health FIELD Network in 2019 to improve training, preparedness and response to One Health threats in Fragile and Conflict Affected States, particularly in the MENAT region.

Boden was appointed Head of the Royal (Dick) School of Veterinary Studies in May, 2023.
