= Charles ffrench-Constant =

Neurologist

- Born: 5 November 1954 (age 71)
- Education: University of Cambridge (MA); Middlesex Hospital (MB, BChir); University College London (PhD)
- Awards: FMedSci (2017); FRSE (2018)
- Scientific career
- Fields: Neurology
- Workplaces: University of Cambridge; University of Edinburgh
- Thesis: (1986)
- Doctoral advisor: Martin Raff

Charles Kenvyn ffrench-Constant is a British neurology researcher, specialising in multiple sclerosis. He has been recognised for his "fundamental and sustained contributions that underpin much contemporary research in developmental and regenerative neuroscience".

== Education and early career ==
ffrench-Constant gained an MA in Physiology from the University of Cambridge and an MB, BChir in Medicine from Middlesex Hospital in 1980. As a graduate student in the laboratory of Martin Raff at University College London, ffrench-Constant discovered that there are small numbers of oligodendrocyte progenitor cells (OPCs) in cell suspensions prepared from adult rat optic nerves. He gained his PhD in neuroscience from UCL in 1986. Following a postdoctoral fellowship at Massachusetts Institute of Technology, he returned to Cambridge and took up a postdoctoral fellowship at the Wellcome/CRC institute (now the Gurdon Institute).

== Later career ==
ffrench-Constant started his own laboratory in Cambridge in 1991, focusing on developmental and regenerative biology. From 1999 to 2007 he was professor of neurological genetics at Cambridge. In 2007, he moved to become professor of medical neurology at the University of Edinburgh. He has been co-director of the Anne Rowling Regenerative Neurology Clinic since 2012 and from 2010 to 2015 was director of the Centre for Regenerative Medicine.

In March 2021, the University of East Anglia announced that ffrench-Constant had been appointed as pro-vice-chancellor for the faculty of Medicine and Health Sciences, starting June 2021.

== Awards and honours ==
ffrench-Constant was elected as a Fellow of the Academy of Medical Sciences in 2017, and as a Fellow of the Royal Society of Edinburgh in 2018. He was awarded the Chancellor's Award for Research Excellence in 2019, in recognition of his outstanding research in the field of Neurobiology.

== Personal life ==
ffrench-Constant enjoys sailing and walking, and is a season ticket holder at Norwich City F.C.
