= Free Trade Union =

British trade organisation

The Free Trade Union, later known as the Free Trade League, was a British trade organisation extant between July 1903 and the 1970s. It was founded in opposition to the campaign for Imperial Preference which had been launched by Board of Trade chairman Joseph Chamberlain in May 1903. This scheme was intended to promote trade preferentially with British imperial possessions by imposing tariffs on certain classes of goods imported from outside the "preference" zone.

The Union's president between 1948 and 1959 was Andrew McFadyean, and it had close links with the right wing of the Liberal Party. By 1959 the organisation had a membership of between one and two thousand, but struggled financially. It was taken over by Oliver Smedley and Stanley Walter Alexander prompting the resignation of several prominent Liberal Party members. Bertrand Russell was a speaker on behalf of the group.

The organisation was renamed the "Free Trade League" in 1962, in an effort to prevent confusion with trade unions, and was finally wound up in about 1972, although some members around David Wedgwood established a new organisation of the same name.
