= David Cottrell =

British academic (1947–2009)

David Fredrick Cottrell
- Born: 1947; Tiverton, Devon
- Died: 15 June 2009 (aged 61–62)
- Education: University of Edinburgh
- Occupation: Veterinary scientist

David Frederick Cottrell (1947-2009) was a British academic who became a Senior Lecturer, Physiology Department then Preclinical Vet Sciences at The Royal (Dick) School of Veterinary Studies, in Edinburgh, Scotland.

Cottrell specialised in sensory neurophysiology, ruminant and equine alimentary physiology, and equine gastroenterology. He contributed to the Journal of Physiology, Neuron and Nature.

== Education ==
Cottrell was born in 1947 in Tiverton, Devon. He graduated from the University of Liverpool, Faculty of Veterinary Science in 1970 going on to gain his Ph.D.on “Duodenal Sensory and Reflex Mechanisms” from The University of Edinburgh in 1981.

== Teaching ==
Cottrell came to Edinburgh and joined the physiology teaching staff in October 1973. A year later he took up MSc post-graduate studies in the department and in October 1975 was appointed lecturer.

== Publications ==
- Cottrell, D.F. (1981), 'Duodenal sensory and reflex mechanisms', Thesis (Ph.D.) University of Edinburgh
- Cottrell, D.F. (2010), 'Principles and concepts in body systems', Edinburgh: Royal Dick School of Veterinary Studies
- Takasaki, Midori; Kitamura, Nobuo; Hondo, Eiichi; Cottrell, David F.; Yamada, Junzo (1998), 'Three-Dimensional Development of Bovine Reticular Cell (Cellula reticuli)' European Journal of Morphology, February 1998, Vol.36(1), pp. 57–64
- Felipe A. Court; Diane L. Sherman; Thomas Pratt; Emer M. Garry; Richard R. Ribchester; David F. Cottrell; Susan M. Fleetwood-Walker; Peter J. Brophy (2004), 'Restricted growth of Schwann cells lacking Cajal bands slows conduction in myelinated nerves'. Nature, 2004, Vol.431(7005), p. 191
