= Henry Felix Clement Hebeler =

British veterinary surgeon

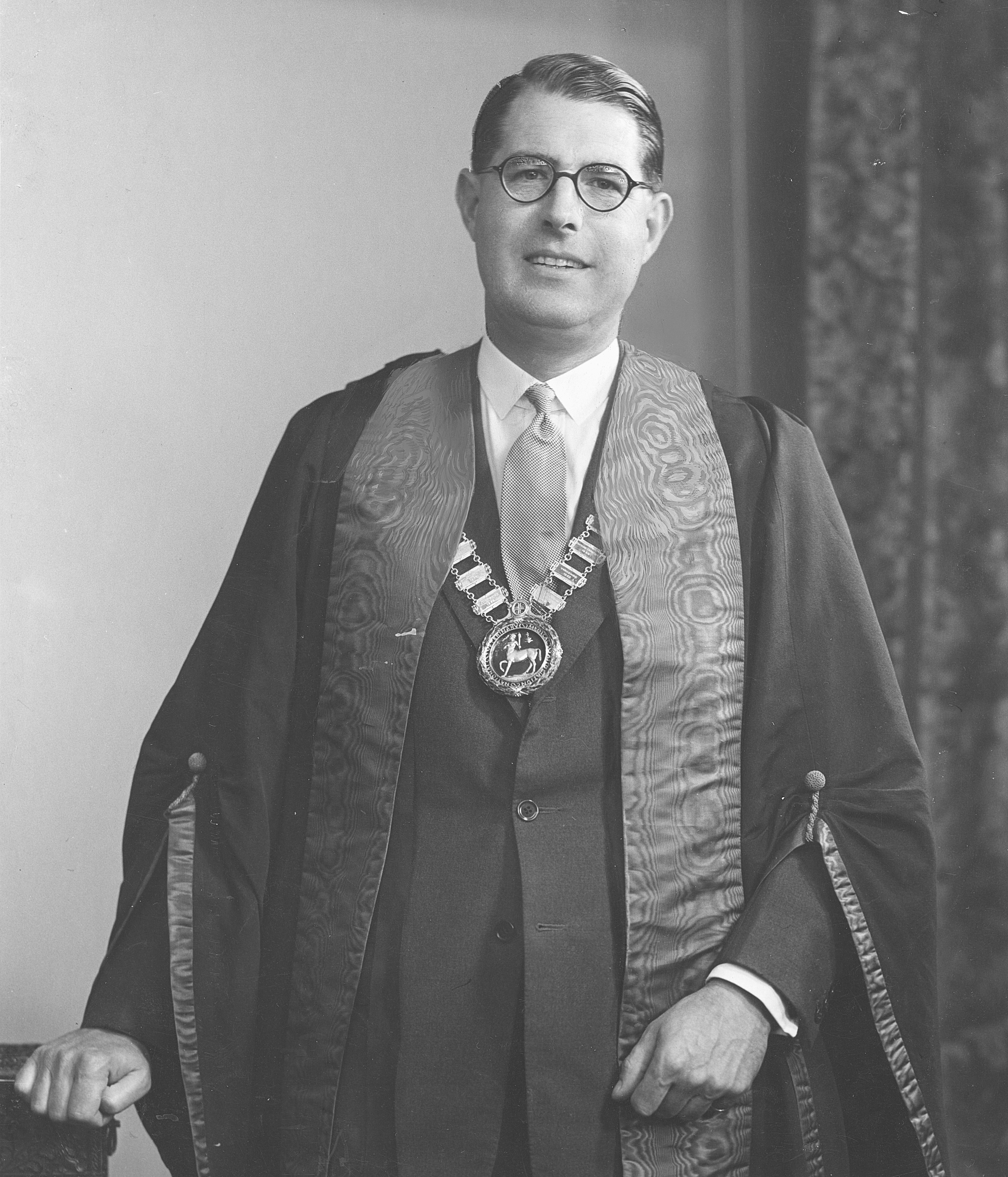

Henry "Buffy" Felix Clement Hebeler CBE (1917–1989) was a British veterinary surgeon.

== Life ==
Henry Felix Clement Hebeler known as 'Buffy' was born 21 April 1917 in Edinburgh, Scotland, to Henry Leycester Hebeler (1872–1930) and Phyllis Margaret née Parker (1886–1965). His paternal great-grandfather Bernard Hebeler, KCRE FSS (1794–1862) was the Prussian Consular General to the court of Queen Victoria. Bernard Hebeler was brother-in-law to John Leycester Adolphus (1795–1862) a barrister and historian. Another of his great grandfathers was James Meadows Rendel FRS (1799–1856) who was a British civil engineer. Through his maternal side, Hebeler was connected to the Salvesen family. Hebeler's maternal aunt Maude Hannah Parker was married to Noel Graham Salvesen. His maternal uncle Henry Michael Denne Parker, CBE (1895–1975) was a Fellow of Magdalen College, Oxford and an authority on the Roman legion.

'Buffy' and his brother Christopher Rendel (1915–40) were pupils at St Edward's School, Oxford. 'Buffy' graduated from Royal (Dick) School of Veterinary Studies. Hebeler was a member of the British Veterinary Association where he served as Treasurer, Secretary and President (1958–59). Hebeler was awarded the CBE in 1983 for services to the veterinary profession and to animal welfare. He wrote several articles and was cited in other articles on veterinary practice. Hebeler practiced as a vet in Langport, Somerset, UK.

== Family ==
In 1943 he married Daphne Watson (1921–1946) - they had one son Henry Christopher. In 1947 he married Sybil Grace Palmer (1924–2017) - they had two sons Simon Felix and Jonathan Noel.
