= Douglas Ewart High School =

Secondary school in Dumfries and Galloway, Scotland

Coordinates: 54.960°N 4.490°W

Douglas Ewart High School was opened in 1922 in Newton Stewart, Scotland. It was formed by the amalgamation of the Douglas Free School opened in 1834 and the High School of the Ewart Institute opened in 1864.

School Glow Website:

https://blogs.glowscotland.org.uk/dg/douglasewart/

== Headteachers ==
George Webb (2019-2023)

Stephen Foster (2023-2024)

George Webb (2024-2026)

Julianna Gordon (2026)

== Notable former pupils ==
- John Dedman, member of the Australian Parliament
- James A. Mirrlees, Nobel Prize winner
- Kate Dickie, actress
- Sir John McFadyean, pathologist
- Janice Maxwell, Lawn Bowls - Scottish Singles Champion 1986, Triple-World Champion 1992, Commonwealth Games Bronze 1994.
