= Hegeler =

Hegeler may refer to:

- Hegeler (surname)
- Hegeler Carus Mansion, historic house in Illinois, U.S.
- Hegeler, Vermillion County, Illinois, an unincorporated community in Vermillion County
