= Clare Blackburn =

British biologist

- Education: University of Edinburgh (BSc); Imperial College London (PhD)
- Awards: FRSE (2015)
- Scientific career
- Fields: Biology
- Workplaces: Walter and Eliza Hall Institute of Medical Research; University of Oxford; University of Edinburgh
- Thesis: A study of the secreted acetylcholinesterases of Nippostrongylus basiliensis (1991)
- Website: www.ed.ac.uk/profile/clare-blackburn

Catherine Clare Blackburn FRSE is a British biologist. She received her Bachelor of Science degree at University of Edinburgh in 1984 and her PhD at Imperial College London in 1991. Following Wellcome Trust fellowships at the Walter and Eliza Hall Institute of Medical Research, University of Oxford, she returned to the University of Edinburgh in 1997. Since 2011, she has been Professor of Tissue Stem Cell Biology at the Centre for Regenerative Medicine.

Blackburn's group focuses on the research of thymus development. In 2014, they successfully created functional thymus cells from fibroblasts of a mouse, using the reprogramming technique.

Blackburn is the Project Coordinator of the pan-European EuroStemCell public engagement initiative. She has also co-produced a number of documentary films including the feature-length "Stem Cell Revolutions".

== Honours and awards ==
In 2012, Blackburn was awarded the University of Edinburgh's Tam Dalyell Prize for Excellence in Engaging the Public with Science. In 2015, she was elected a Fellow of the Royal Society of Edinburgh.
