= James Law (veterinary surgeon) =

Scottish veterinary surgeon

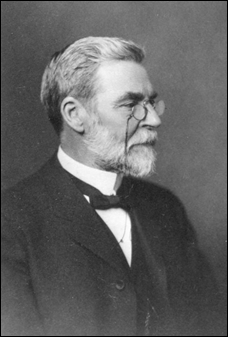
- Born: 13 February 1838; Edinburgh, Scotland
- Died: 10 May 1921 (aged 83)
- Known for: The first veterinary professor at an American university

James Law (13 February 1838 – 10 May 1921) was a Scottish veterinary surgeon who became the first veterinary professor at an American university, teaching biology, agriculture and veterinary medicine at Cornell University from 1868.

== Early life and education ==
Law was born in Edinburgh on 13 February 1838. In 1854, at the age of 16, he enrolled at the Edinburgh Veterinary College (which later became the Royal (Dick) School of Veterinary Studies) and graduated with honours in 1857. He was awarded his diploma from the Royal College of Veterinary Surgeons (RCVS) in 1861, and became a member of the RCVS.

== Career ==
Cornell University was founded in 1865, and in 1868 its president, Andrew Dickson White, visited Europe to recruit faculty staff. He had been instructed by Ezra Cornell to find a "horse doctor", and on the recommendation of Edinburgh Veterinary College's Dr. John Gamgee, he met James Law. Dr Law moved to the United States, and started teaching students in October 1868.

Law was elected president of the American Veterinary Medical Association in 1906.

Law died on 10 May 1921.
