= Journal of Veterinary Internal Medicine =

- Discipline: Veterinary medicine
- Language: English
- Edited by: Stephen P. DiBartola and Kenneth W. Hinchclifff

Publication details
- History: 1987–present
- Publisher: Oxford University Press
- Frequency: Bi-monthly
- Open access: Yes
- Impact factor: 3.333 (2020)

Standard abbreviations
- ISO 4: J. Vet. Intern. Med.

Indexing
- CODEN: JVIMEM
- ISSN: 1939-1676 (print); 1939-1676 (web)
- LCCN: 86010621
- OCLC no.: 60626957

Links
- Journal homepage

Journal of Veterinary Internal Medicine (JVIM) is a bimonthly peer-reviewed scientific journal covering new scientific developments in veterinary internal medicine. It was established in 1987 and is published by Oxford University Press. It is the official publication of the American College of Veterinary Internal Medicine, the European College of Veterinary Internal Medicine, the European College of Veterinary Neurology, and the European College of Equine Internal Medicine.

== History ==
The journal was established in 1987 by the American College of Veterinary Internal Medicine with approval of the American Veterinary Medical Association. It was published as a bimonthly print journal until 2014 and became an open access journal as of January 1, 2015. Authors must pay an article processing charge (APC) and publish under a Creative Commons license. Formerly published by Wiley, the journal began to be published by Oxford University Press as of January 1, 2026.

According to the Journal Citation Reports, the journal's 2020 impact factor is 3.333, ranking it 12 out of 146 journals in the category ‘Veterinary Sciences’.
