= Centre for Regenerative Medicine =

Stem cell research centre

Coordinates: 55.9198°N 3.131°W

- Established: 2008
- Focus: Regenerative treatment
- Co-Directors: Anna Williams; Tilo Kunath
- Staff: 300 (2019)
- Key people: Austin Smith; Ian Wilmut; Charles ffrench-Constant
- Location: University of Edinburgh, Scotland
- Website: www.ed.ac.uk/regenerative-medicine/

The Centre for Regenerative Medicine (CRM) is a stem cell research centre at the University of Edinburgh in Scotland, dedicated to the study and development of new regenerative treatments for human diseases. The centre forms part of the university's Institute for Regeneration and Repair and is part of the BioQuarter cluster at Little France.

== History ==
The University of Edinburgh's history in stem cell research dates back to the early 1990s. Under the leadership of Austin Smith, the university's Centre for Genome Research became the first Institute of Stem Cell Research (ISCR) in the UK. The CRM was formed in 2008 as a merger of ISCR scientists with scientists from the University's College of Medicine and Veterinary Medicine, an initiative directed by Ian Wilmut. From 2008 to 2020, the centre had MRC status. Charles ffrench-Constant became the 2nd Director of CRM in 2010; he was succeeded by Stuart Forbes in 2015. In 2024, Anna Williams and Tilo Kunath were appointed co-directors of the centre.

As of 2016, the CRM had attracted £55 million in research funding.

== Research ==
The centre is home to 26 research groups; group leaders include Clare Blackburn, Ian Chambers, Charles ffrench-Constant, Stuart Forbes, Dónal O'Carroll and Ian Wilmut. As of 2019, the CRM employs 300 scientists. Conditions being researched at the CRM include multiple sclerosis and heart and liver disease. On 25 August 2014, the centre grew the first working organ, a thymus, from scratch inside an animal. In 2019, the centre published the first in-human trial of a macrophage therapy for liver cirrhosis.

== CRM building ==
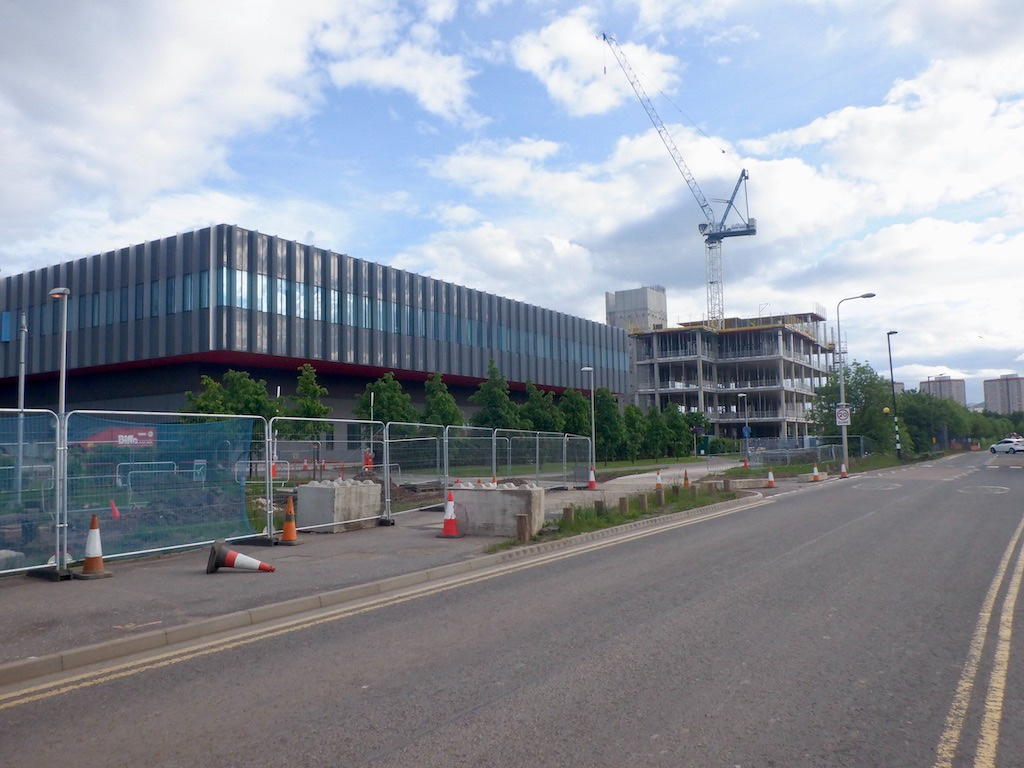
The centre surrounded by construction in June 2021

The CRM building was officially opened by the Princess Royal on 28 May 2012. Designed by Sheppard Robson, the building is part of a total £600 million joint investment in stem cell biology and medicine by the Scottish Government and the University of Edinburgh.

The CRM building is also home to applied scientists working with the Scottish National Blood Transfusion Service and Roslin Cells. It contains laboratory and support space, a company incubator unit, and a clinical translation unit which enables the production of cells at Good Manufacturing Practice (GMP) grade. CRM spinout companies include Cellinta (developing gene therapies for cancer) and Resolution Therapeutics (developing cell treatments for liver damage).

== See also ==
- Edinburgh Science Triangle
- Scottish Enterprise
- Translational research
