= Orlando Charnock Bradley =

British veterinarian

Orlando Charnock Bradley FRSE (8 May 1871 – 21 November 1937) was a British veterinarian and the first president of the National Veterinary Medical Association. He is described as one of the foremost veterinarians of the 20th century.

== Life ==
He was born in Wheelton near Chorley in Lancashire on 8 May 1871. He studied at Chorley Grammar School and then the Harris Institute in Preston (studying chemistry, animal physiology and botany) before travelling north to Edinburgh to study as a vet. This was at the New Veterinary College run by William Williams, set up in rivalry to the Dick Vet School set up by William Dick. He graduated in 1892 and then took up a role as a lecturer at the College. As was common at that time, Bradley also studied anatomy at the University of Edinburgh as an extramural subject at the same time as attending the college, a practice introduced by William Dick. This was done under the famous anatomist, Sir William Turner. In 1903 Bradley won the Goodsir Memorial Fellowship for his thesis, On the development and homology of the mammalian cerebellar fissures. Bradley obtained his DSc from the University of Edinburgh in 1905 with a thesis entitled, Contributions to the development and morphology of the mammalian hind-brain. In 1907 he was awarded a Doctor of Medicine by the same university for his thesis, Contribution to the morphology and development of the mammalian liver.

In 1900 he was offered the chair of Veterinary Anatomy at the Royal Dick Veterinary College, the foremost such college in Scotland. In 1911 he became its Principal.

In 1909 he founded the National Veterinary Medical Association, and was its first president. He was Vice-President of the Royal College of Veterinary Surgeons in 1912 and served as its president from 1920 to 1922.

He died on 21 November 1937.

== Publications ==
Between 1893 and 1908, Bradley published 47 papers on scientific subjects, focusing upon anatomy and/or veterinary history.

- Outlines of Veterinary Anatomy (1896)
- A Guide to the Dissection of a Dog (1912)
- The Structure of the Fowl (1915)
- Atlas of the Anatomy and Physiology of the Horse (1918)
- Topographical Anatomy of the Dog (1919)
- Topographical Anatomy of the Limbs of the Horse (1920)
- Topographical Anatomy of the Thorax and Abdomen of the Horse (1922)
- Topographical Anatomy of the Head and Neck of the Horse (1923)
- The History of the Edinburgh Veterinary College (1923)

He was the founder of the Veterinary Review in 1917 and its editor until 1920.
