= Ralph Stockman =

Scottish professor

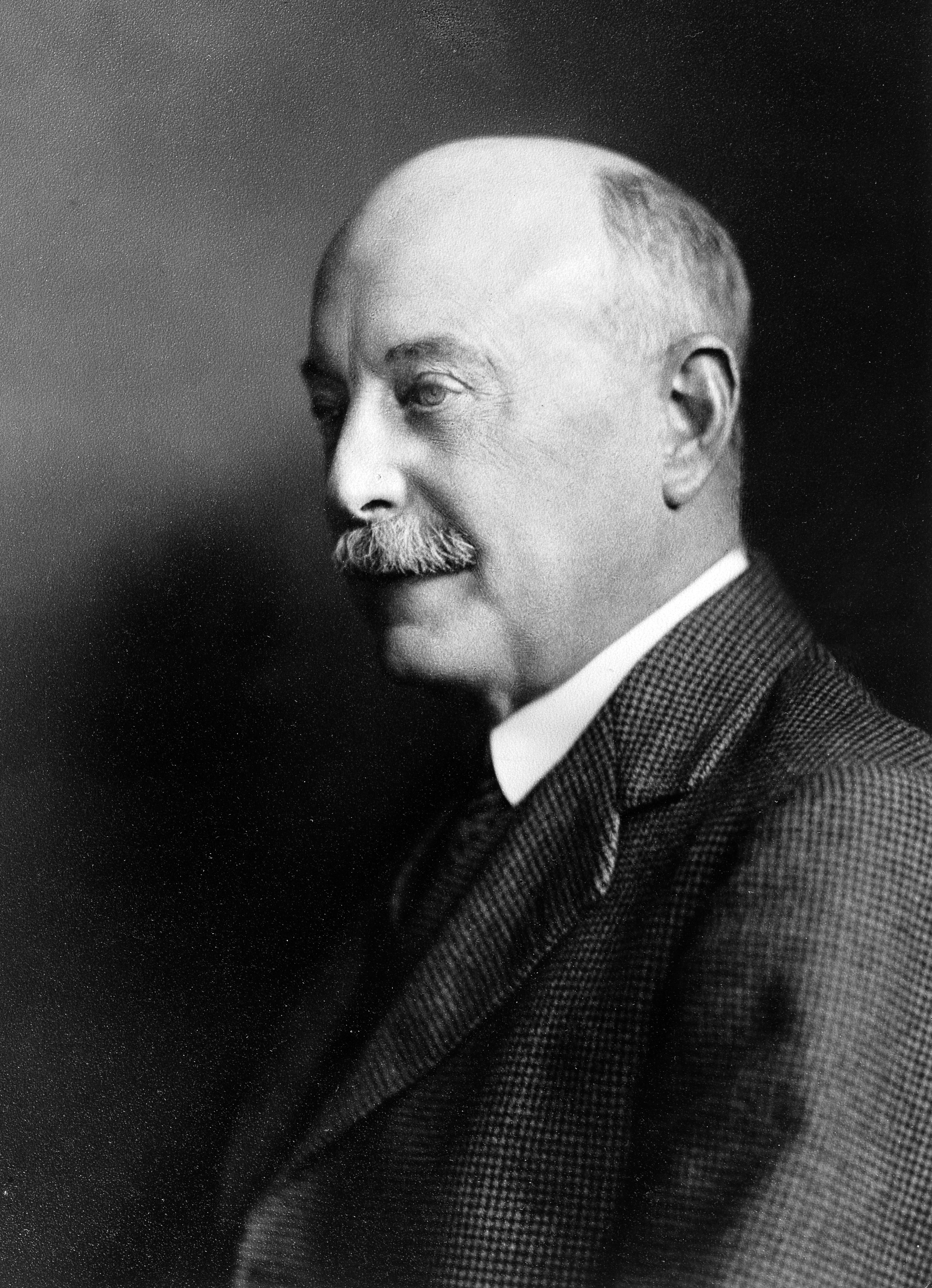
- Photograph by T. & R. Annan & Sons Ltd.
- Born: 3 August 1861; Leith, Scotland
- Died: 27 February 1946 (aged 84); Glasgow, Scotland
- Education: Royal High School, Edinburgh; University of Edinburgh (MB ChB, MD); Postgraduate studies in Vienna and Strasbourg
- Known for: Research on iron deficiency anaemia
- Honors: Fellow of the Royal Society of Edinburgh (1888); Member of the Harveian Society of Edinburgh (1892); Member of the Aesculapian Club (1928); Honorary LLD, University of Glasgow (1936)
- Scientific career
- Fields: Materia Medica, Therapeutics
- Institutions: University of Glasgow, Glasgow Western Infirmary

Ralph Stockman (3 August 1861–27 February 1946) was a Scottish Professor of Materia Medica and Therapeutics at the University of Glasgow. He was an expert on iron deficiency anaemia.

== Life ==
Stockman was born on 3 August 1861 at Wellington Street in Leith the son of William J. Stockman. The family moved to 2 Bonnington Place in his youth, soon after the birth of his younger brother, Stewart Stockman.

Ralph was educated at the Royal High School in Edinburgh then studied medicine at the University of Edinburgh graduating with a MB ChB in 1882. He then did postgraduate studies at both Vienna and Strasbourg before returning to Edinburgh to obtain his doctorate (MD) in 1886. He then moved to Glasgow to work at the Glasgow Western Infirmary and lecture at the University of Glasgow. In 1897 he was given a professorship.

In 1888 he was elected a Fellow of the Royal Society of Edinburgh. His proposers were Sir Andrew Douglas Maclagan, Alexander Crum Brown, Sir German Sims Woodhead, and Sir Thomas Richard Fraser. In 1892 he was elected a member of the Harveian Society of Edinburgh and in 1928 he was elected a member of the Aesculapian Club. In 1936 the University of Glasgow awarded him an honorary doctorate (LLD).

In later life he lived at 16 Newton Terrace, a side street near Sauchiehall Street, in central Glasgow.

He retired in 1936 and died on 27 February 1946.

== Publications ==
- Report on Coca Alkoloids (1889)
- Pharmacology of Morphine and its Derivatives (1890)
- Ingestion and Excretion of Iron in Health (1897)
- The Action of Arsenic on Bone Marrow and Blood (1898)
- Inflammarory Hyperplasia (1904)
- Rheumatism and Arthritis (1920)
