= University of Liverpool School of Veterinary Science =

School in Liverpool, UK

Coordinates: 53.407°N 2.967°W

- Type: Public veterinary school
- Established: Incorporated 1904
- Affiliations: University of Liverpool
- Location: Liverpool, England, UK
- Campus: Urban and Rural
- Website: http://www.liv.ac.uk/vets

The University of Liverpool School of Veterinary Science was the first veterinary school in the United Kingdom to be incorporated into a university. The school's teaching, treatment and research facilities are on the main campus and at Leahurst on the Wirral Peninsula, approximately 12 miles outside Liverpool.

== History ==
=== Foundation ===
The foundations for the vet school at Liverpool were laid in the early 1900s when William Owen Williams, principal of the now-defunct New Veterinary College in Edinburgh (not to be confused with the Royal (Dick) Vet School, with which it was in competition), was invited to transfer his institution to Liverpool. The emerging science of veterinary medicine was of particular relevance both to the busy port city itself, which depended upon heavy horses to drive its docks and associated industry, and to the economy of the surrounding countryside, which at the time boasted the highest stocking density of cattle in the UK.

Initially, there was considerable resistance to the idea of a vet school operating within the confines of a civic University, as this seemingly endorsed a 'one-portal' entry system to the profession, thereby cementing the authority of the RCVS and its diploma. There was also opposition from the Royal College itself, as the new school was initially incorporated into the university's medical faculty and, controversially, students received some instruction from medical staff.

=== Leahurst ===
The UK's first veterinary field station was established at Leahurst in 1941. Today, most of the school's clinical facilities are located at this site, including the three main referral hospitals and many of the research facilities. It was the focus of Rolf Harris' Channel 5 series Rolf's Animal Clinic, which returned for a second season in 2014 as Ben Fogle's Animal Clinic, with Ben Fogle taking over presenting duties.

=== Veterinary Surgeons Act ===
The 1948 Veterinary Surgeons Act made a university degree a registrable qualification for veterinary practice. Two years later, the school was the first in the UK to receive an Order in Council allowing those obtaining the BVSc qualification to practice veterinary medicine.

=== Internal structure ===
In 1952, the school was formally accorded faculty status. In 2009 following an internal restructure of the university, the faculty was demoted back to school status under the stewardship of the new faculty of health and life sciences.

== Facilities ==
The trend towards increased specialisation and the subsequent expansion in clinical training has led to the development of Liverpool's three main teaching hospitals:

=== Philip Leverhulme Equine Hospital (PLEH) ===
Built in the late 1990s at a cost of £1.4 million, the equine hospital (also known as the Philip Leverhulme Equine Hospital or PLEH) is one of the busiest and most successful equine referral hospitals in the UK, treating over 2,000 patients per year with an annual turnover in excess of £1.2 million.

The hospital has particular expertise in the areas of gastroenterology, oncology, orthopaedics and neurology and is fully equipped to undertake laparoscopic investigations of the equine abdomen (e.g. for recurrent or chronic colic) and to perform operative procedures via laparoscopy, e.g. ovariectomy.

Digital imaging technology available at the hospital includes digital X-ray/computed radiology, gamma scintigraphy, CT, MRI and ultrasonography.

There are also facilities for iridium wire therapy, laser treatment and in 2011 the hospital opened the Barrie Edwards Intensive Care Unit, one of the most advanced and well-equipped equine intensive care units in the UK.

The hospital is named for Philip William Bryce Lever, the 3rd Viscount Leverhulme in recognition of his support for the school and university (see the Leverhulme Trust).

=== Small Animal Teaching Hospital (SATH) ===
The Small Animal Teaching Hospital, originally established in 1977 on the Liverpool campus, joined the other teaching hospitals at Leahurst with the construction of a new £9.6 million facility in 2007. It currently treats over 10,000 patients per year with a turnover in excess of £2.5 million.

=== Farm Animal Hospital ===
The farm animal unit, which opened in 1996, takes cases from throughout North West England and North Wales for detailed investigation and intensive care treatment.

== Liverpool University Veterinary Society ==
Liverpool University Veterinary Society (LUVS) is the official student body of the veterinary school at Liverpool. They organise many sporting, social, theatrical and charitable events throughout the year.

== Organisation ==
The school provides undergraduate and postgraduate courses in veterinary medicine.

=== Undergraduate ===
In 2006 there were 559 undergraduate students enrolled on the BVSc course and 84 on the Bioveterinary Science BSc degree course.

=== Postgraduate ===
The school offers three master's degrees: Veterinary Parasitology, Animal Reproduction and Veterinary Infection and Disease Control. The Diploma in Bovine Reproduction is available to MRCVS qualified candidates. The school has research degrees in infectious diseases, epidemiology, musculoskeletal systems, animal behaviour and protein function.
