= William McGregor Mitchell =

Scottish veterinary surgeon

Prof William McGregor Mitchell FRSE MC TD (1888 – 13 April 1970) was a 20th-century Scottish veterinary surgeon who served with distinction in the First World War, and was later the Director of the Veterinary Services in Scotland.

== Life ==
He was born in 1888 the son of a veterinary surgeon.

He studied medicine at the University of Edinburgh, and studied as a veterinary at the Dick Vet College in the south of the city.

In the First World War he served in the Royal Army Veterinary Corps and was especially involved in the rehabilitation of horses. He was awarded the Military Cross for his bravery in June 1917.

In 1919 he joined the Dick Vet as Professor of Veterinary Surgery. At the Dick Vet he ran the Officer Training Corps and was awarded the Territorial Decoration for his services in 1928. He served in the Royal Army Medical Corps in the Second World War at the rank of Major. In 1946, after the war, he became Director of the college.

He was President of the British Veterinary Association 1946/7. In 1951 he was elected a Fellow of the Royal Society of Edinburgh. His proposers were Francis Albert Eley Crew, James Couper Brash, Alexander Murray Drennan and James Ritchie.

From 1953 to 1957 he also served as Professor of Veterinary Education at the University of Edinburgh.

He died in hospital in Haddington on 13 April 1970.

== Artistic recognition ==
His portrait by Robert Lyon is held by the University of Edinburgh.
