= Richard Halliwell (veterinarian) =

British veterinary surgeon

- Born: 1937 (age 88–89)
- Education: University of Cambridge
- Known for: Veterinary dermatology
- Awards: Hugo Schindelka medal (World Association for Veterinary Dermatology)
- Scientific career
- Workplaces: University of Edinburgh

Richard E. W. Halliwell (born 1937) is a British veterinary surgeon. He has been President of the Royal College of Veterinary Surgeons, the American College of Veterinary Dermatology and European College of Veterinary Dermatology. He twice served as Dean of the Dick Vet School in Edinburgh.

== Education and career ==
Halliwell studied veterinary science at Cambridge University graduating in 1961, and subsequently receiving his doctorate there in 1973.

He taught at both the University of Pennsylvania and the University of Florida. He served as Dean of Veterinary Science at Edinburgh University (at the Dick Vet School) for two periods, from 1990 to 1994 and for the academic year 2001–02.

In 1989, he was President of the world's first conference on Veterinary Immunology in Dijon in France. From 1994 to 1998, he was president of the European Association of Establishments for Veterinary Education (EAEVE).

In 2012, he was awarded the Hugo Schindelka medal by the World Association for Veterinary Dermatology (WAVD) in Vancouver, in recognition of a lifetime of excellent work in the field of veterinary dermatology. That same year, the World Small Animal Veterinary Association awarded him their international award for scientific achievement for advancing knowledge regarding disorders of companion animals.

== Recognition ==
Halliwell was one of twenty "shadow portraits" created in the Summerhall building of the college, depicting former Principals. The portraits are now in the Easter Bush buildings.

== Works ==
- Halliwell, Richard E.W.; Gorman, Neil T. (1989). Veterinary Clinical Immunology. Saunders. ISBN 9780721611976. OCLC 925713876.
- Halliwell, RE (2004). "Accreditation of veterinary schools in the United Kingdom and the European Union: the process, current issues and trends, and future concerns". Journal of Veterinary Medical Education. 31 (2): 105–10. doi:10.3138/jvme.31.2.105. PMID 15181590.
- Halliwell, R.E.W.; Hoskin, B. D. (1 October 2005). "Reducing the suicide rate among veterinary surgeons: how the profession can help". Veterinary Record. 157 (14): 397–398. doi:10.1136/vr.157.14.397. PMID 16199772. S2CID 28394612.
- Halliwell, R.E. (21 June 2008). "Is our divided profession a profession in decline?". Veterinary Record. 162 (25): 828. doi:10.1136/vr.162.25.828. PMID 18567933. S2CID 24561807.
- Halliwell, RE (August 2009). "The responsibilities of veterinary educators in responding to emerging needs in veterinary medicine". Revue Scientifique et Technique. 28 (2): 487–92. doi:10.20506/rst.28.2.1883. PMID 20128455.
- Nuttall, Tim; Uri, Maarja; Halliwell, Richard (22 February 2013). "Canine atopic dermatitis – what have we learned?". Veterinary Record. 172 (8): 201–207. doi:10.1136/vr.f1134. PMID 23436599. S2CID 7179285.
- Halliwell, R.E.W.; Downes, M.; Adams, V.J.; Allister, R.; Harrison, W.; Mellanby, R.J.; Dean, R.S. (16 June 2016). "Stress in new graduates: can the profession do more to help?". Veterinary Record. 178 (25): 635–636. doi:10.1136/vr.i3032. hdl:20.500.11820/1158d7c2-67ea-44f9-a01d-af4aff867c59. PMID 27313254. S2CID 44636708.
