= Hegeler (surname) =

Hegeler is a German surname. Notable people with the surname include:

- Anja Hegeler (1965–2022), German chess master
- Edward C. Hegeler (1835–1910), American metallurgist and businessman
- Hartmut Hegeler (born 1946), German theologian
- Jens Hegeler (born 1988), German footballer
- Wilhelm Hegeler (1870–1943), German writer
