= Thomas Walley =

British veterinarian

Prof Thomas Walley FECVS (1842–1894) was a 19th-century British veterinarian who served as Principal of the Dick Vet school in Edinburgh from 1874 to 1894.

He was a pioneer in identifying the link (through milk consumption) between bovine and human tuberculosis.

== Life ==
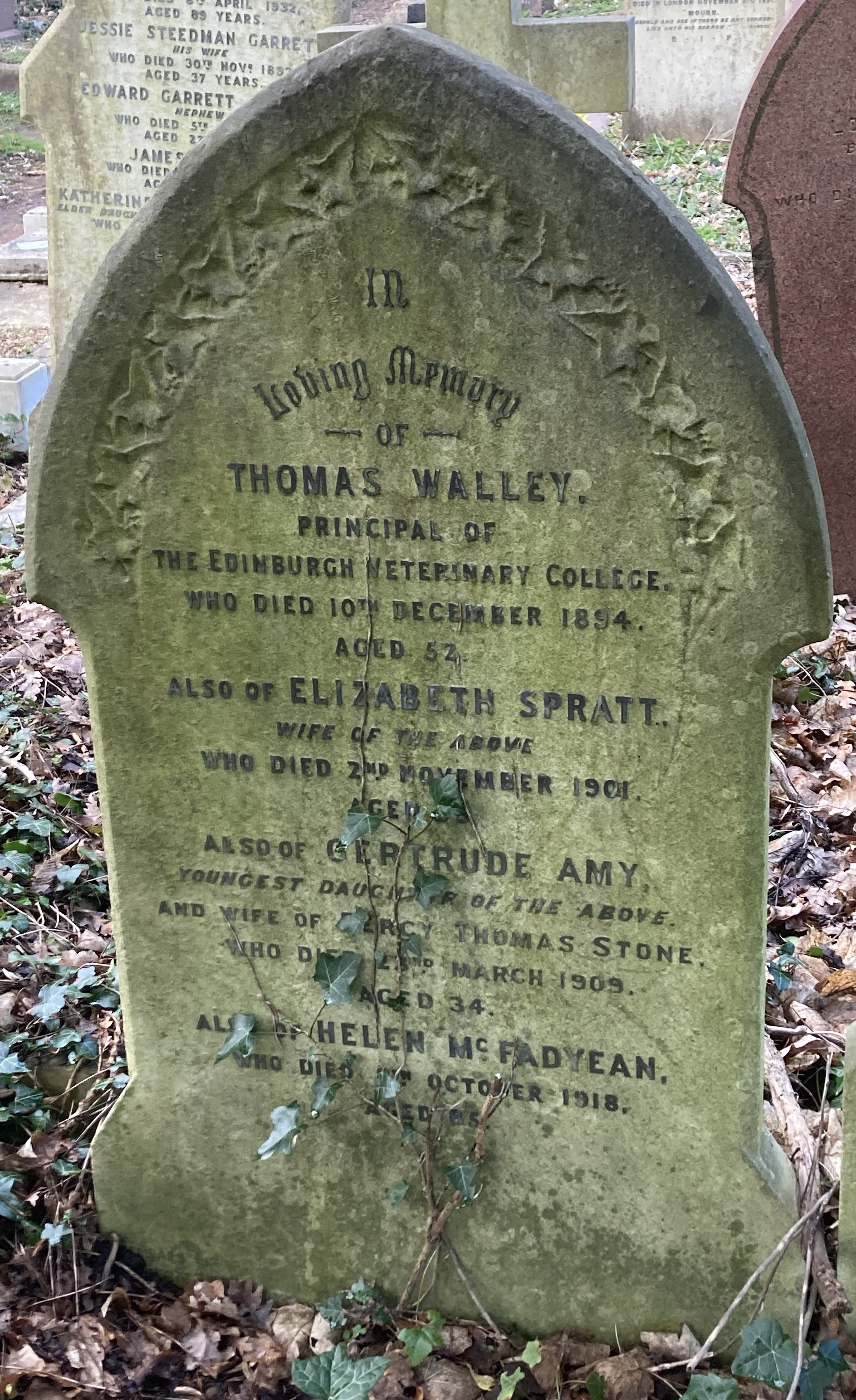
Family grave of Thomas Walley in Highgate Cemetery

He entered the Dick Vet School as Professor of Animal Pathology and Cattle Pathology around 1872 and at first lived at 9 Thistle street close to the college (then on Clyde Street). In March 1872 he came to an odd claim to fame as the person responsible for the autopsy on Greyfriars Bobby, which concluded that Bobby died from cancer of the jaw.

He became Principal of the College in 1874. He then lived at 1 Wellington Place in Leith, facing onto Leith Links.

In 1894 he was running the Veterinary College (Dick Vet) on Clyde Street in the First New Town in Edinburgh and also ran a veterinary infirmary and farriers yard on Jane Street in Leith, living at that point at 10 Broughton Place in the eastern New Town.

He died in office in Edinburgh on 10 December 1894 and was replaced by his friend Prof John Dewar. He was buried in a family grave on the east side of Highgate Cemetery.

== Family ==
Thomas married Elizabeth Spratt Clay and they had five children: Mara Eleanor (b.23.6.1865), Thomas St.George (b.5.8.1867), Ralph St.John (b.13.5.1869), Constance Elizabeth (b.23.7.1872) and Gertrude Amy (b.18.8.1874).

Their eldest daughter, Mara Eleanor Walley, married John McFadyean (1853-1941), the first British veterinary bacteriologist, who was later knighted, and was Principal of (and a Professor at) the Royal Veterinary College from 1894 to 1927.

== Artistic recognition ==
Walley was one of twenty "shadow portraits" created in the Summerhall building of the college, depicting former Principals. The portraits are now in the Easter Bush buildings.

== Publications ==
- Public Abattoir in Relation to Human Food (1887)
- Animal Tuberculosis in Relation to Consumption in Man (1887)
