= David Argyle =

British veterinarian

David Argyle is a British veterinarian. He is Vice-Principal and Head of the College of Medicine and Veterinary Medicine at the University of Edinburgh.

Argyle specialises in comparative oncology and cancer in animals. Recognised as an RCVS Specialist in Veterinary Oncology, Argyle was also awarded foundation Diplomat status in Veterinary Oncology in 2005 in recognition for his standing and contributions to the discipline. He later established the Riddell Swann Cancer Centre at Easter Bush, now considered a model for comprehensive cancer therapy and a training ground for the next generation of clinical oncologists. Argyle is Head of the examining board for the European Diploma Qualification in Oncology, chair of the examination board for the ECVIM residency programme for Oncology, and has trained a number of clinical oncologists now in private practice or clinical roles. In 2016 he was elected Fellow of the Royal Society of Edinburgh, and in the same year Fellow of the Royal College of Veterinary Surgeons (for meritorious contributions to veterinary research). As Dean of Veterinary Medicine at the University of Edinburgh, he has successfully introduced a new career pathway for veterinarians to enable both research and clinical training through the Wellcome Trust Funded “Edinburgh Clinical Academic track for Veterinarians” (ECAT-V).

In 2008, Argyle was awarded the Petplan Prize for Scientific Achievement and in 2014, the Kennel Club International Award for contributions to canine health.

== Veterinary career ==
- Argyle studied Veterinary Medicine at Glasgow University from 1986-1991, returning to undertake a doctorate (PhD) in Immunology and Oncology in following a period in general practice.
- He became senior lecturer in Clinical Gene Therapy and Oncology at Glasgow University in 1999.
- In 2002, he obtained a post as Associate Professor at the University of Wisconsin-Madison.
- Argyle returned to Scotland in 2005 to become William Dick Chair of Veterinary Clinical Studies at the Dick Vet school in Edinburgh (part of the University of Edinburgh). There he set up the first Cancer and Imaging Centre for animals.
- In 2009, Argyle became Dean, International (Medicine and Veterinary Medicine) and Dean, Postgraduate Research (Medicine and Veterinary Medicine) at the University of Edinburgh.
- In 2011, he became Head of School, Royal (Dick) School of Veterinary Studies, University of Edinburgh.
- In 2016, he was elected a Fellow of the Royal Society of Edinburgh.
- From 2017 to 2018, he served as Interim Head of the College of Medicine and Veterinary Medicine and VP for Medicine and Veterinary Medicine for the University of Edinburgh.
- He is joint Scientific Editor of the Journal of Veterinary and Comparative Oncology.
- In June 2020, he was elected Junior Vice-President of the Royal College of Veterinary Surgeons for 2020-21.
- In 2022, he became Head of the College of Medicine and Veterinary Medicine at the University of Edinburgh.

== Controversy ==
In 2019, the Sunday Times published two articles alleging a 'toxic' culture at the Dick Vet school in Edinburgh, of which Argyle is Head. In 2020, an independent review (Intersol Global Report) was commissioned by the University of Edinburgh. The summary of the Intersol report was leaked to the national and veterinary press (Sunday Times and The Veterinary Record), leading the RCVS to warn against 'Trial by media'. The allegations were rejected by an independent investigation, which concluded there was no evidence of misconduct. This conclusion was upheld after an appeal.

On 5 November 2020, Argyle temporarily stepped down from his Junior Vice President and RCVS Council duties for personal reasons.

As Vice-Principal, Argyle is a member of the Senior Leadership Team and University Executive. On 20 May 2025, the Senate, the University of Edinburgh's supreme academic body, approved the motion that "Senate has no confidence in the University Executive’s leadership in relation to the University’s financial situation", by a two thirds majority.

Argyle oversaw a restructure of the College of Medicine and Veterinary Medicine in 2025, in a process which apparently breached the Universities (Scotland) Act 1966.

== Publications ==
=== Books and Chapters ===
- Decision Making in Small Animal Oncology (2009)
- Advances in cancer diagnostics (2008)
- Decision making in feline cancer patients (2008)
- What is new in canine and feline lymphoma (2008)
- Preclinical Organotypic Models for the Assessment of Novel Cancer Therapeutics and Treatment (2019)
