= Royal (Dick) School of Veterinary Studies =

University of Edinburgh's vet school

Coordinates: 55°51′55″N 3°12′00″W

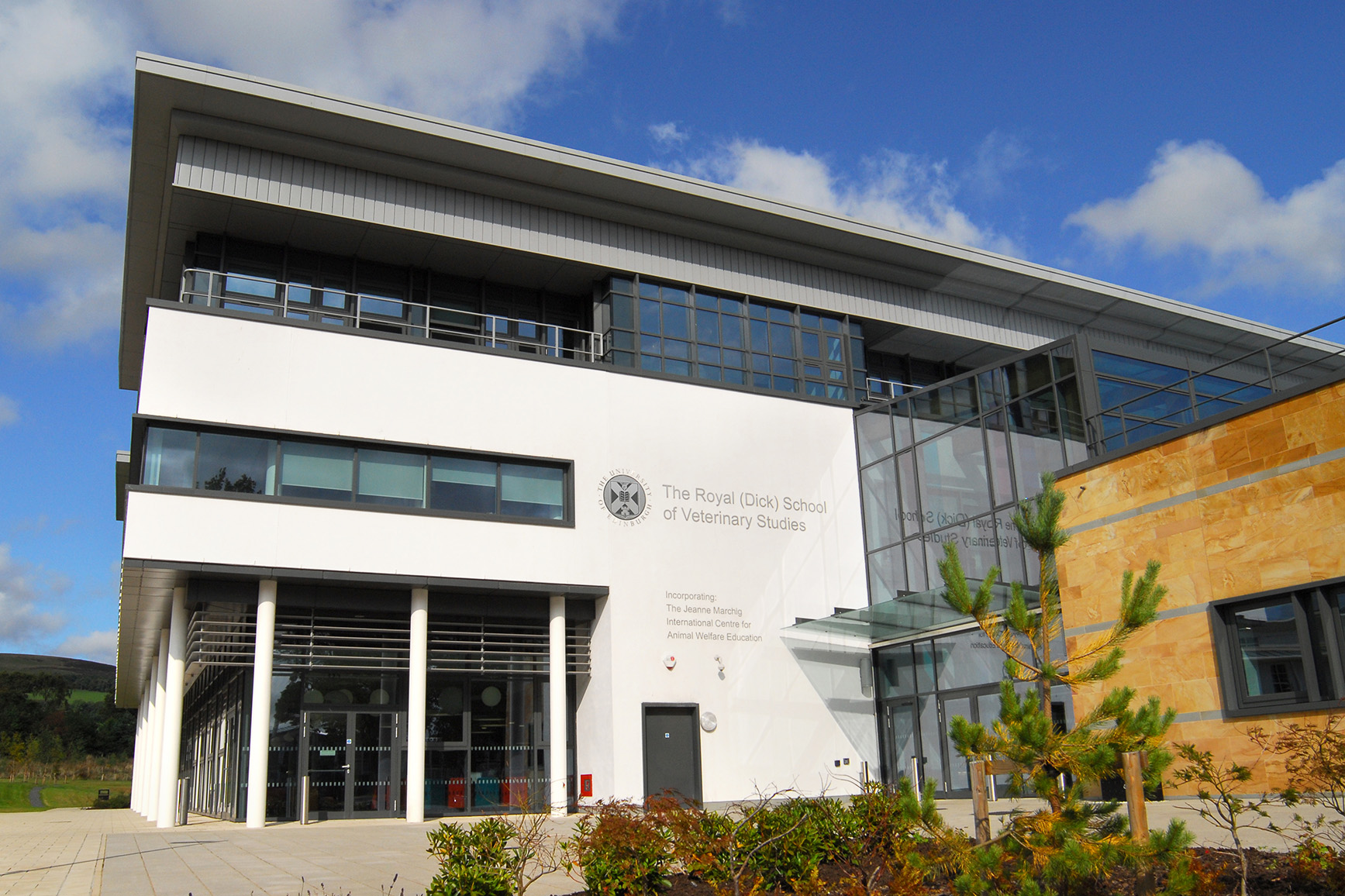
- Former names: Clyde Street Veterinary College, Dick Veterinary College, Royal (Dick) Veterinary College
- Type: Veterinary school
- Established: 1823; 203 years ago
- Parent institution: University of Edinburgh College of Medicine and Veterinary Medicine
- Head of School: Lisa Boden
- Location: Edinburgh, Scotland
- Website: www.ed.ac.uk/vet

The Royal (Dick) School of Veterinary Studies (abbreviated as the Dick Vet) is the veterinary school within the College of Medicine and Veterinary Medicine at the University of Edinburgh in Scotland.

The School was ranked first in the UK in the ShanghaiRanking's Global Ranking of Academic Subjects 2022 – Veterinary Sciences, second in the UK by the QS World University Rankings 2023 for Veterinary Science, first in the UK for the sixth year running by the Guardian League Table 2022, and second in the UK for the second year running by the Times and Sunday Times Good University Guide ranking for Veterinary Medicine.

== History ==
Originally called the Highland Society's Veterinary School, Edinburgh, the Dick Vet, as it came to be known, was established by William Dick, a former student of the anatomist John Barclay of the Royal College of Surgeons of Edinburgh. The first regular classes at the school were begun in November 1823, although lectures to small groups of students had been provided for four years prior to this date. That first session of regular classes was financed by student fees and a grant from the Highland Society of Scotland at Edinburgh, of which John Barclay was a director. Mary Dick, William's elder sister, was reputed to have been instrumental, from the early days, in the administration of the school.

=== Clyde Street ===
In 1833, William Dick, who was by then a successful veterinary practitioner and teacher, paid for construction of purpose-built accommodation near the site of his father's forge in a Clyde Street courtyard. William lived adjacent at 15 Clyde Street. (Today Multrees Walk is approximately where Clyde Street was.) This was the base for the school until it moved to its next site at Summerhall in 1916. In 1839, his school officially became a college and William Dick was given the title professor. By the time of Dick's death in 1866, the over 2000 students he had taught were to be found throughout the world. Among them were the founders of veterinary schools in Australia, Canada, Ireland and the United States. On his death, Dick bequeathed his college in trust to the Burgh Council of Edinburgh.

It was officially named Dick's Veterinary College following a request made by his sister, in 1873, in response to a crisis caused by the establishment of the rival New Veterinary College set up by alumnus and former Principal William Williams. Williams had taken with him the majority of the students, and the library. The two schools existed amicably within 100 m of one another in Edinburgh's New Town until 1904, when the Williams' school moved to Liverpool, England, forming the basis of the University of Liverpool Faculty of Veterinary Science. The Royal (Dick) Veterinary College was incorporated by Act of Parliament in 1906.

=== Summerhall ===
University of Edinburgh (Royal (Dick) Veterinary College) Order Confirmation Act 1951
- Act of Parliament
- Parliament of the United Kingdom
- Long title: An Act to confirm a Provisional Order under the Private Legislation Procedure (Scotland) Act 1936[a] relating to the University of Edinburgh (Royal (Dick) Veterinary College).
- Citation: 14 & 15 Geo. 6. c. xiv

Dates
- Royal assent: 10 May 1951

Orlando Charnock Bradley was principal of the Dick Vet when it moved in 1916 to the south side of Edinburgh, to another purpose-designed building, at Summerhall.

On 10 May 1951 the college was reconstituted as The Royal (Dick) School of Veterinary Studies, and officially became part of the University of Edinburgh, and became a full Faculty of Veterinary Medicine in 1964. Reorganisation of the university in 2002 resulted in the abolishment of Faculties, and the Dick Vet once again became The Royal (Dick) School of Veterinary Studies, one of the four Schools within the College of Medicine and Veterinary Medicine.

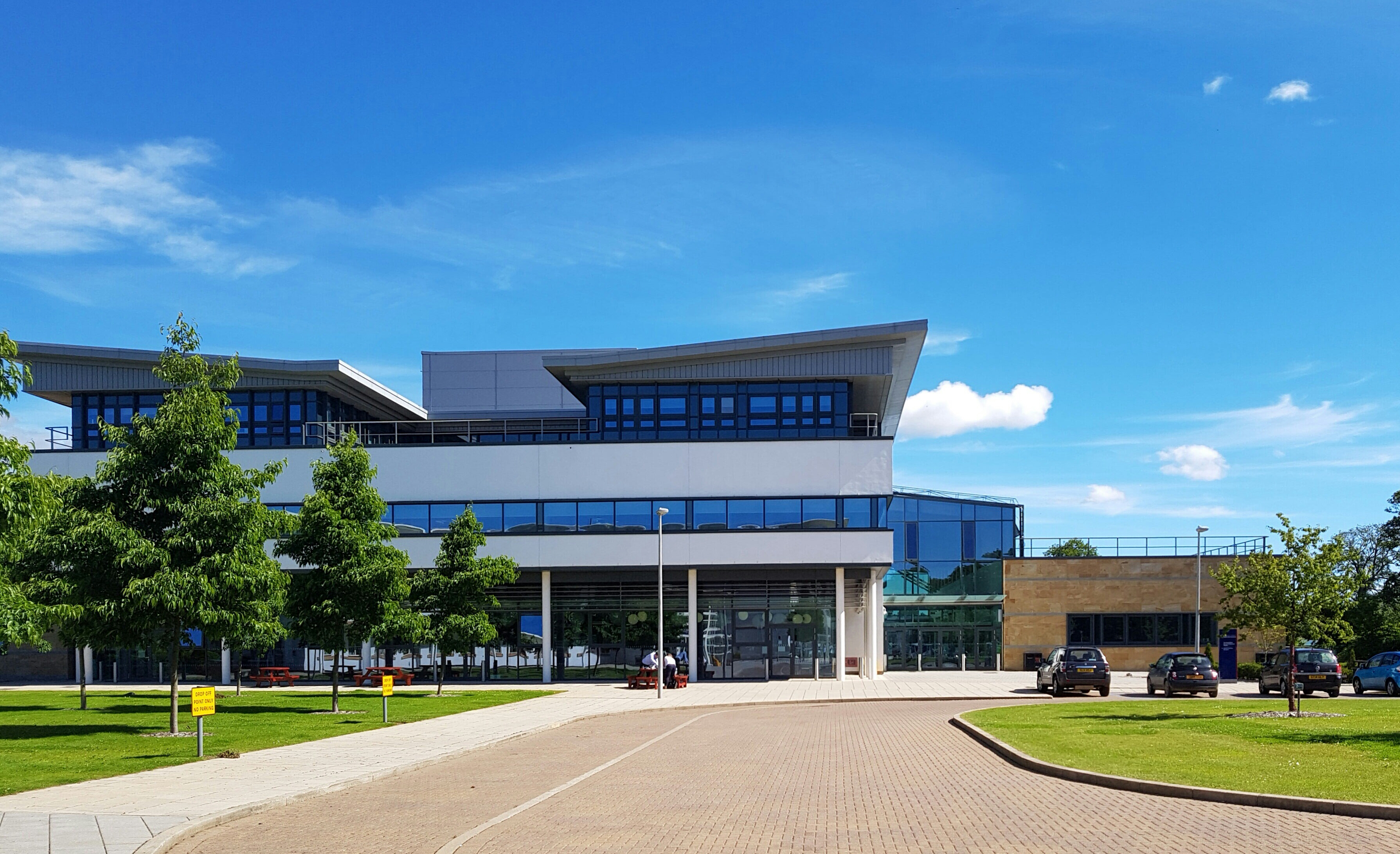
Royal (Dick) School of Veterinary Studies Main Building, Easter Bush Campus

In 2009, Scottish Television filmed a five-part documentary at the Royal (Dick) School of Veterinary Studies. Some of the cases shown on the documentary follow a wild swan needing an endoscopy, a horse in emergency colic surgery, a skunk being neutered, a chameleon with an eye infection, and the removal of a tumour near a cat's heart.

=== William Dick Building ===
The William Dick Building, was opened for teaching in September 2011 by Anne, Princess Royal and sits on the Easter Bush Campus. It contains purpose-built facilities for veterinary teaching, including a clinical skills laboratory, anatomy facilities and two lecture theatres. It holds a canteen which is open to staff, students and the general public. The Scottish figurative sculptor Andy Scott (sculptor) created the original artwork Canter for the facility's opening.

=== National Avian Research Facility ===
In September 2013, the National Avian Research Facility was opened on the Easter Bush campus in partnership with the Pirbright Institute. NARF's mission is to improve the productivity, health and welfare of poultry through research on host-pathogen interactions, avian genetics, development and physiology using state-of-the-art technologies.

=== Charnock Bradley Building ===
The Charnock Bradley Building is a hub for the Easter Bush Campus, providing a home for the Roslin Innovation Centre, Easter Bush Science Outreach Centre (EBSOC) and the Easter Bush Gym. Opened in May 2018 by the Princess Royal the building contains office and laboratory space. Located in front of the building sits Canter a sculpture by Andy Scot, who is best known for The Kelpies. it was unveiled in May 2018 at the same time as the building opened and the 15 ft steel statue of a horse's head forms the centrepiece of the entrance plaza.

==== Easter Bush Science Outreach Centre ====
The Easter Bush Science Outreach Centre (EBSOC) was opened on 1 May 2018 by the Princess Royal. EBSOC is a purpose-built teaching laboratory, which offers interactive curriculum linked learning experiences for school pupils and community groups.

== People ==
=== Notable alumni ===
- Joseph Henry Carter (1857–1930), President of the Royal College of Veterinary Surgeons in 1920
- Min Chueh Chang (1908–1991), clinical fellow in agricultural science, co-inventor of the combined oral contraceptive pill and winner of the Albert Lasker Award
- Robin Coombs, (1921–2006, grad. 1943), who devised the ′Coombs test′, a critical diagnostic test for use in haematology and blood transfusion
- John Boyd Dunlop, (1840–1921, grad. 1859?60), inventor of the first practical pneumatic tyre, and founder of Dunlop Rubber Company
- Sir Frederick Fitzwygram, (1823–1904), president of the RCVS (1875–1877) and as such unified the veterinary profession
- George Fleming (1833–1901, grad. 1855), founder of the Veterinary Journal in 1875, architect of the 1881 Vet Surgeons Act
- James Law, the first professor of veterinary medicine in the United States (Cornell)
- James McCall, established the Glasgow Veterinary College in 1862
- Duncan McNab McEachran, (1841–1924, grad. 1861), co-founder of the Upper Canada Veterinary School in 1863, founder of the Montreal Vet College in 1866,
- Albert E. Mettam, (1866–1917) first principal of Royal Vet College, Dublin
- Prof William Christopher Miller Professor of Animal Husbandry at the Royal Veterinary College, London
- Hamish Moore, (grad. 1975), maker, musician and teacher of Scottish Bagpipes, especially the Scottish Smallpipes.
- Jotello Festiri Soga, (grad. 1886), first South African veterinary surgeon,
- Donald Sinclair, (1911–1995, grad. 1933), portrayed as Siegfried Farnon in Alf Wight's (James Herriot) novels
- Brian Sinclair, (1915–1988, grad. 1943), the brother to Siegfried Farnon in Alf Wight's (James Herriot) novels, portrayed as Tristan Farnon
- Andrew Smith, founder of the Ontario Veterinary College, Canada, the oldest veterinary college in the Americas
- Alasdair Steele-Bodger (1924–2008), Professor of Veterinary Clinical Studies at the University of Cambridge, son of Harry Steele-Bodger
- Harry Steele-Bodger (1896–1952, grad. 1922), president of the British Veterinary Association
- Sir Stewart Stockman (1869–1926), built first UK research laboratories (Weybridge), president of the RCVS (1923–1924)
- Noah M. Wekesa (1936–present), Minister for Science and Technology in the Kenyan Government
- William Williams (1832–1900), the Welsh veterinary surgeon who founded of the New Veterinary College in Edinburgh in 1873 (which went on to become the Faculty of Veterinary Science of the University of Liverpool) and author of several standard works on veterinary science
- Henry Felix Clement Hebeler (1917–1989), president of the British Veterinary Association (1958–1959)

=== Notable staff ===
- Prof Robert Stewart MacDougall (1862–1947)
- Prof William McGregor Mitchell (1888–1970)
- Prof David Frederick Cottrell (1947–2009)
- Neil Hudson (politician), Member of Parliament – first vet elected to the House of Commons since 1884.
- Prof Susan Rhind OBE is the Director of Veterinary Teaching and Chair of Veterinary Medical Education

=== Directors ===
From amalgamation with Edinburgh University in 1951 the role became first director then dean of faculty rather than principal of the college.

- William Dick (veterinarian) from 1823 to 1866
- Col James Hallen 1866/67
- William Williams (veterinarian) from 1867 to 1873
- Thomas Walley from 1874 to 1894
- John R. U. Dewar from 1895 to 1911
- Orlando Charnock Bradley from 1911 to 1937
- Robert G. Linton (acting 1938/39)
- Sir Arthur Olver from 1939 to 1945
- Donald C. Matheson (acting 1946)
- William McGregor Mitchell from 1947 to 1951 as Principal and 1951 to 1958 as Director of Vet Education
- Alexander Robertson (veterinarian) from 1958 to 1964 as Director and 1964 to 1970 as Dean
- Frank Alexander Dean 1970 to 1974
- Ainsley Iggo 1974 to 1977
- Ian Stuart Beattie from 1977 to 1980
- Keith Dyce from 1980 to 1984
- James T. Baxter 1984/85
- Ainsley Iggo (second term) 1985 to 1990
- Richard Halliwell (veterinarian) from 1990 to 1994
- Morley Sewell from 1994 to 1997
- Hugh R. P. Miller from 1997 to 2001
- Richard Halliwell (veterinarian) (second term) 2001/2
- Hugh R. P. Miller (second term) 2002/3
- Elaine Watson from 2003 to 2011
- David Argyle from 2011 to 2023
- Dylan Clements from 2023 to 2023
- Lisa Boden from 2023 to present
