= British Veterinary Association =

British national veterinary medicine organization

- Abbreviation: BVA
- Formation: 1919 (NVMA)
- Legal status: Non-profit organisation
- Purpose: Veterinary medicine in the UK
- Location: London, W1
- Region served: United Kingdom
- President: Rob Williams
- Affiliations: Royal College of Veterinary Surgeons
- Website: bva.co.uk

The British Veterinary Association (BVA) is the national body for veterinary surgeons in the United Kingdom, and is a not-for-profit organisation. Its purpose is that of knowledge dissemination, which is important in the veterinary profession to prevent a knowledge divide; and not professional validation or academic competence.

== History ==
=== National Veterinary Association ===
A preceding organisation started out as the National Veterinary Association in 1882, after the first ever British National Veterinary Congress in July, 1881. A vet, George Banham, had suggested the idea of a national veterinary association. George Fleming, the principal vet to the Armed Forces, was the first elected president. The association was open to any vet, no matter which country they were from, on the payment of half a guinea. Other previous veterinary associations still co-existed though. It had an informal organisation and meetings across the country were arranged on an ad hoc basis. This style of organisation did not suit many vets, because they wanted an organisation, where they could discuss matters which did not or could not be discussed by the Royal College of Veterinary Surgeons (RCVS). In 1909, at a meeting of the Scottish Metropolitan Veterinary Association, Professor Orlando Charnock Bradley of the Edinburgh Veterinary College, called for a 'one single British veterinary association.' The idea was generally accepted, but the First World War proved to be a hindrance.

=== National Veterinary Medical Association ===
On 31 October, 1919, the National Veterinary Medical Association was formed to subsume smaller, informal veterinary associations. Orlando Charnock Bradley became its first president.

In 1952, it became the BVA.

In 1984, it founded the BVA Animal Welfare Foundation.

== Activities ==
The organisation issues advice and the consensus of professional opinion to members and to the general public about veterinary issues as they arise in current events or trends, such as Avian flu, foot and mouth, and Brexit. The organisation has over 19,000 members.

=== Structure ===
The current president is Rob Williams. The current senior vice president is Elizabeth Mullineaux and the current junior vice president is Gwen Rees. The association's headquarters is situated on Mansfield Street, Marylebone, London.

== Publications ==
British Veterinary Association works with contractor Wiley to publish the BVA's journals, the Veterinary Record and In Practice. The latter dates back to 1979 and is published ten times a year. The Veterinary Record has been in publication since 1888 with members able to search within its voluminous archives dating back to 1996. BMJ also publish Veterinary Record Open and Veterinary Record Case Reports for BVA.

== See also ==
- Royal College of Veterinary Surgeons
- Veterinary medicine
- British Medical Association
- Association of Veterinary Anaesthetists
