= Edinburgh Science Triangle =

Government agency in Edinburgh, Scotland

The Edinburgh Science Triangle (EST) is a multi-disciplinary partnership between universities, research institutes, the NHS Scotland, science parks, the national economic development agency Scottish Enterprise, and central and local government in Edinburgh and neighbouring council areas. The three points of the "triangle" are Livingston in West Lothian, Musselburgh in East Lothian, and the Easter Bush campus in Midlothian.

The collaborative project aims to attract new indigenous and inward investment, and to build a professional scientific community based on academic research and commercial enterprises. The target sectors for the project are the life sciences, informatics, micro- and optoelectronics and energy.

The Edinburgh Science Triangle was launched by Jim Wallace, the Deputy First Minister, in September 2004, at the Roslin BioCentre in Midlothian. It is a member of Edinburgh's Local Investment Partnership, which includes the City of Edinburgh Council, Edinburgh Chamber of Commerce, Scottish Development International and Scottish Enterprise. Scottish Development International promotes the Edinburgh Science Triangle abroad.

Funding to promote and support the Edinburgh Science Triangle comes from Scottish Enterprise, the European Regional Development Fund, the City of Edinburgh, Midlothian and West Lothian councils, and the participating science parks.

== Participants ==
=== Easter Bush Campus ===
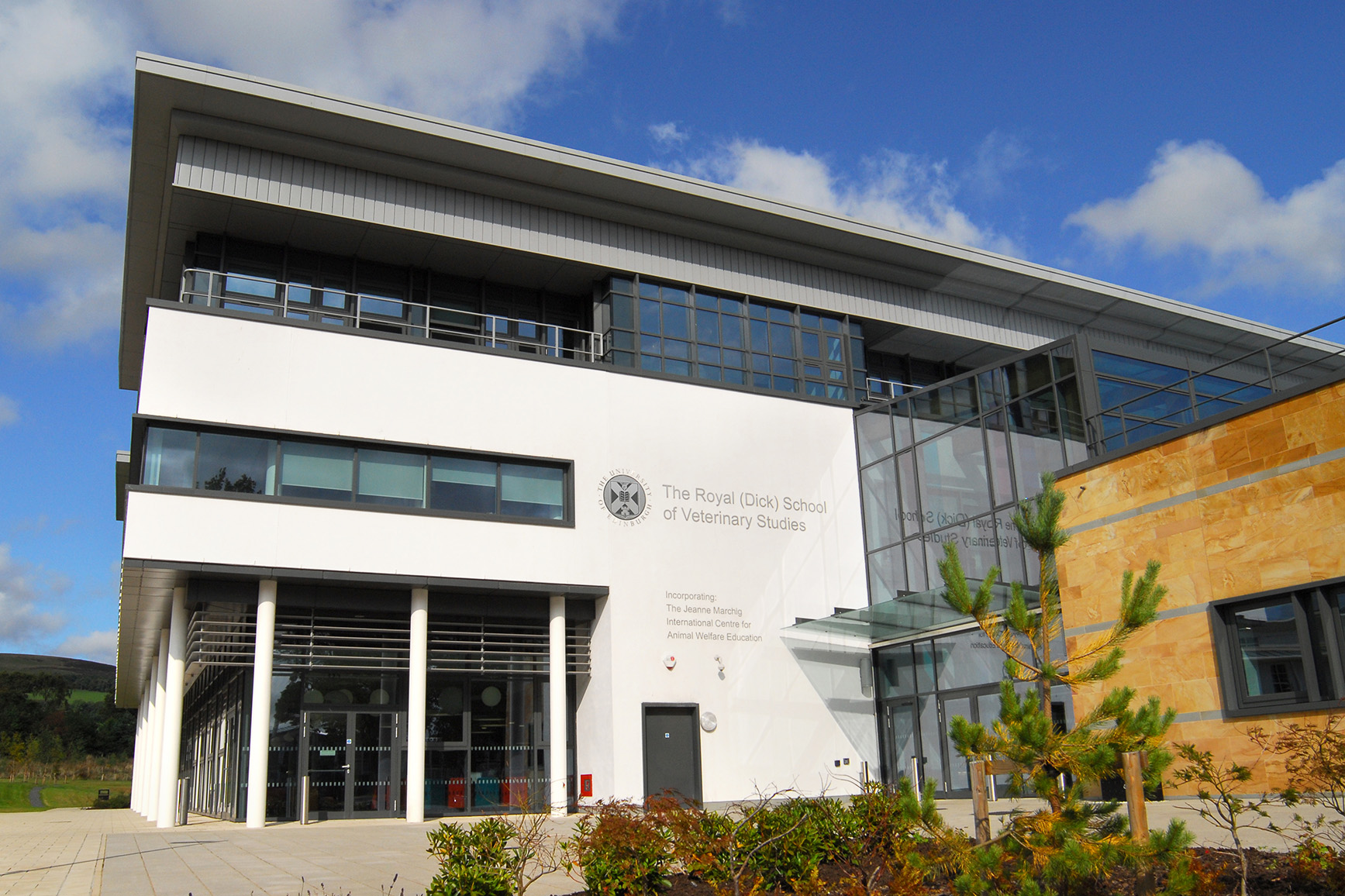
In September 2011 the Dick Vet relocated from Edinburgh to a new building on the Easter Bush campus in Midlothian, 11 km south of the city.

- Moredun Research Institute
- Roslin Institute
- Royal (Dick) School of Veterinary Studies (the Dick Vet)
- Scottish Agricultural College
- EPCC's Advanced Computing Facility

=== Hospitals ===
- Lauriston Building, Edinburgh
- Liberton Hospital, Edinburgh
- Princess Alexandra Eye Pavilion, Edinburgh
- Royal Hospital for Sick Children, Edinburgh
- Royal Infirmary of Edinburgh
- Royal Victoria Hospital, Edinburgh
- St John's Hospital, Livingston, West Lothian
- Western General Hospital, Edinburgh

=== Incubators ===
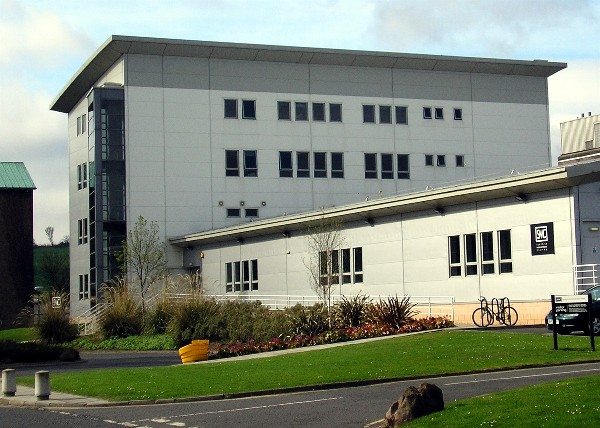
The Scottish Microelectronics Centre at the University of Edinburgh is a centre for business incubation, research and development in the semiconductor sector; it is a joint venture between the university and Scottish Enterprise.

- Edinburgh Research and Innovation, University of Edinburgh
- Scottish Microelectronics Centre

=== Research institutes ===
- Institute for Astronomy, School of Physics and Astronomy, University of Edinburgh
- Institute for Stem Cell Research
- Moredun Research Institute
- Queen's Medical Research Institute
- Roslin Institute
- Scottish Manufacturing Institute

=== Science parks ===
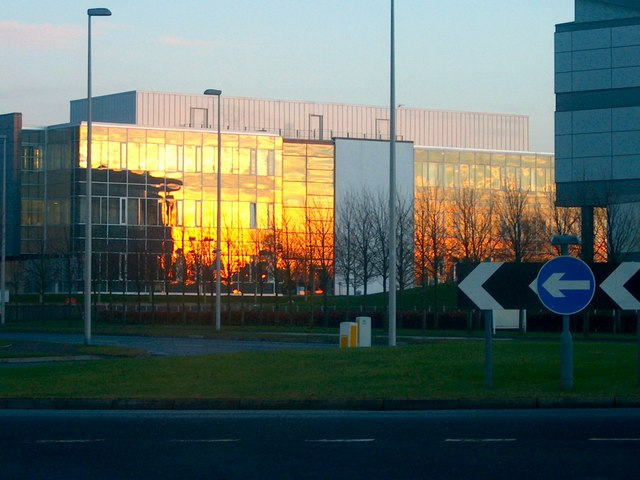
The Alba Innovation Centre in Livingston, West Lothian is at the centre of Silicon Glen.

- Alba Innovation Centre, a Scottish Enterprise project in Livingston, West Lothian, focussed on micro- and opto-electronics and managed by Innovation Centres Scotland. It is a subsidiary of Lanarkshire Enterprise Services.
- BioCampus, Midlothian, focussed on biomanufacturing
- Edinburgh BioQuarter, focussed on life sciences
- Edinburgh Technopole, Midlothian, a general science park
- Heriot-Watt Research Park, Edinburgh, a general science park
- Pentlands Science Park, Midlothian, focussed on animal health and welfare
- Roslin BioCentre, Midlothian, focussed on animal health science

=== Technology transfer organisations ===
- Artificial Intelligence Applications Institute
- Edinburgh Technology Transfer Centre
- Heriot-Watt Technology and Research Services
- Moredun Scientific
- Roslin Cellab

=== Universities ===
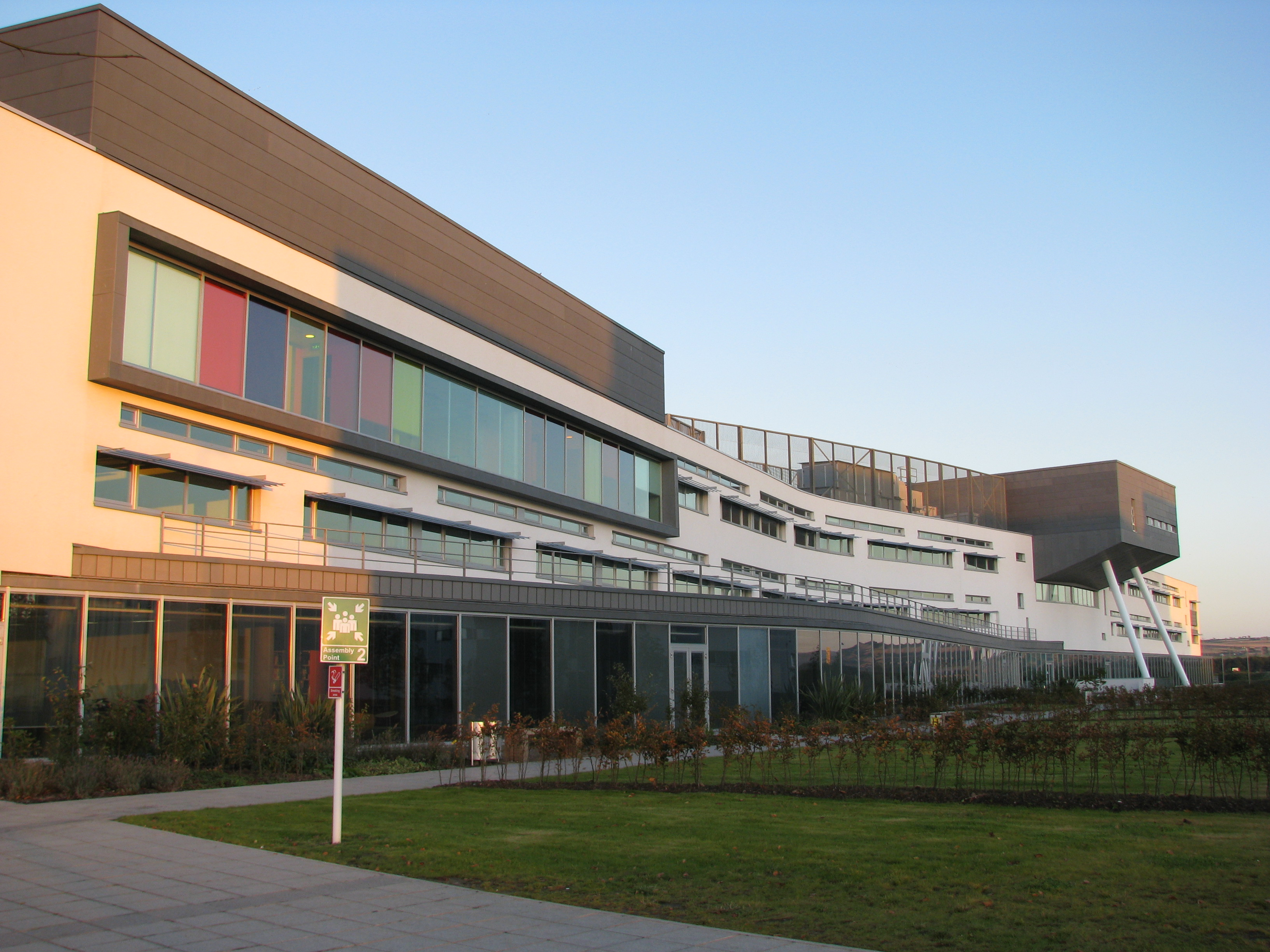
The Queen Margaret University campus in Musselburgh, East Lothian, opened in 2008.

- Edinburgh Napier University
- Heriot-Watt University, Edinburgh
- Queen Margaret University, Musselburgh, East Lothian
- University of Edinburgh

== See also ==
- Silicon Glen
