= Royal Hospital for Children and Young People =

- NHS Lothian
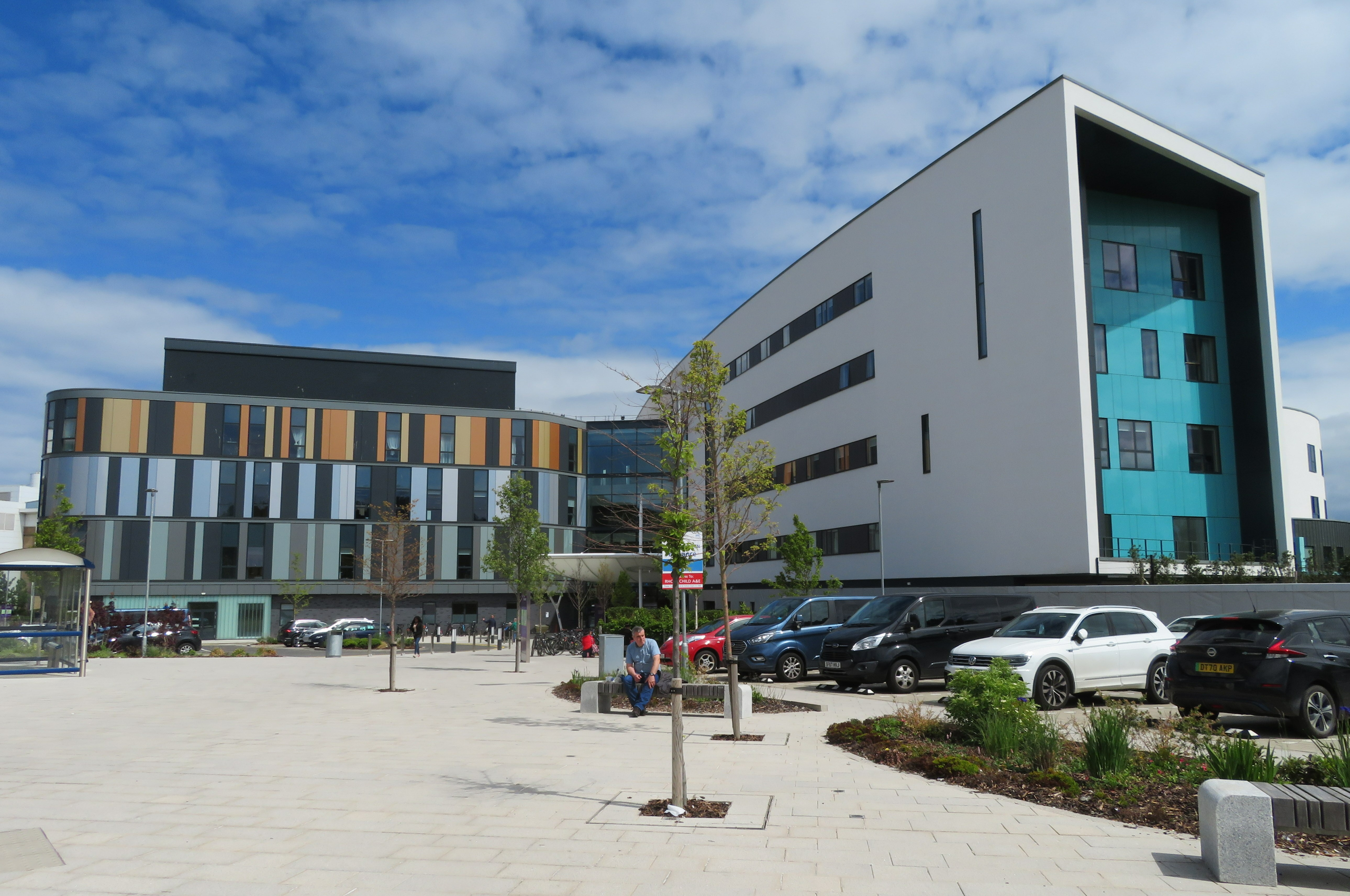

- Shown in Edinburgh

Geography
- Location: 50 Little France Crescent, Edinburgh, Scotland, United Kingdom
- Coordinates: 55.9214°N 3.1376°W

Organisation
- Care system: NHS Scotland
- Type: Teaching
- Affiliated university: University of Edinburgh Medical School

Services
- Emergency department: Yes Accident & Emergency
- Beds: 167
- Speciality: Paediatric

Helipads
- Helipad: Yes

History
- Founded: 23 March 2021

Links
- Website: children.nhslothian.scot/the-rhcyp/
- Lists: Hospitals in Scotland

The Royal Hospital for Children and Young People is a hospital that specialises in paediatric healthcare based in Edinburgh, Scotland. The hospital replaced the Royal Hospital for Sick Children (the Sick Kids) in Sciennes. It forms part of the Royal Infirmary of Edinburgh campus in the Edinburgh BioQuarter at Little France. The facility provides care for children and young people from birth to around 16 years of age and is managed by NHS Lothian.

== History ==
In 2005, NHS Lothian decided to develop plans to move the Sick Kids from its present site to the Royal Infirmary of Edinburgh at Little France on the south-east edge of the city. A business case for the project was approved by the Scottish Government in January 2012. The hospital was procured under the Scottish government's non-profit distributing model in 2015.

The design was carried out by HLM Architects, and the construction, which is being carried out by Brookfield Multiplex at a cost of £150 million, began in February 2015.

In August 2016, it was announced the project would be delayed because of adverse weather conditions and two of the project's builders entering administration. In May 2017, it was announced the new hospital would be called Royal Hospital for Children and Young People.

After further initial delays, it was announced that the Children's Emergency Department would transfer to the new site on 9 July 2019 and that between 5 July and 15 July, multiple children's services including Child and Adolescent Mental Health Services will also move. However, two weeks prior to the scheduled opening, a fault in the air conditioning system in part of the hospital and, subsequently, faults with the drainage system were found; it would cost an estimated £90 million to fix these faults. as of August 2020

The hospital was officially opened on 23 March 2021.

== Services ==
The new building at Little France, which will have 233 beds, will treat patients up to the age of 16. It will also accommodate the Department of Clinical Neurosciences, which will move across from the Western General Hospital, and the Department of Child and Adolescent Mental Health Service (CAMHS), which will move from the Royal Edinburgh Hospital.

== Transport ==
The hospital is accessible by public transport via local bus services and there are several car parks on site. Close proximity parking is available to pre-book, for those with a clinical need. There are 112 disabled parking spaces on site.
