= Moredun Research Institute =

Research institute in Midlothian, Scotland

The Moredun Research Institute is a scientific research institution based at the Pentlands Science Park, in the Bush Estate area of Midlothian, Scotland. It conducts research into diseases of farm livestock and the promotion of animal health and welfare.

Moredun employs over 200 vets, scientists and support staff, that are funded primarily by the Scottish Government. The Institute received £7.1 million from the government in 2010–11.

== History ==
The Animal Diseases Research Association, now the registered charity the Moredun Foundation, was founded in 1920 by a group of Scottish farmers, with the aim of improving the health of livestock, especially sheep. The association founded a research institute employing vets and scientists, and over the decades the scope of animal health work expanded to cover goats, cows, horses and wildlife.

The institute was originally based at Moredun, in Edinburgh.

The origins of Moredun go back to the years following World War I which saw an increased demand for home grown food and a significant rise in the market value of livestock. This emphasised the seriousness of the losses associated with disease and concerned farmers voiced their strong support for an organised body to conduct research into livestock diseases. In the 1920s louping ill and braxy claimed almost a third of the lambs born in Scotland and grass sickness was having a devastating effect on horses, which were used for heavy labour on farms at that time. In March 1920 a group of enlightened Scottish farmers held a public meeting at the Highland and Agricultural Society's chambers in Edinburgh and the Animal Diseases Research Association (now known as The Moredun Foundation) was formed. Within six years the founder members had raised enough funds to buy a plot of land and build the Moredun Research Institute. Within ten years of the Research Institute opening, Moredun scientists had discovered the cause and developed vaccines and treatment strategies for braxy and lamb dysentery. Scientists then went on to solve the mystery of louping ill which was found to be caused by a virus transmitted by ticks and a vaccine was soon developed.

By the 1940s over half a million doses of vaccine and treatment products were produced and distributed by Moredun. Research gained momentum and further funding was secured to find out the causes of many different diseases such as: scrapie, pine, milk fever, Johne's disease and a range of respiratory and reproductive disorders. Vaccines, diagnostics and treatment strategies followed. Today, many of the veterinary medicines and vaccines that are routinely used on farms have been researched, developed or tested at Moredun. This research is vital – 17% of the value of the UK sheep industry is lost each year due to infectious diseases. Subclinical infections of gut parasites are estimated to cost the UK sheep industry over £84 million a year in lost production. Enzootic abortion in ewes is thought to cost the UK sheep industry £15 million a year and Johne's disease costs the UK cattle industry £13 million a year.

== Pentlands Science Park ==
The Pentlands Science Park opened in 1995. It is part of the Moredun Group, under the control of the Moredun Foundation. It is a public-private partnership. The Pentlands Science Park and Moredun are participants in the Edinburgh Science Triangle project.

In addition to being the home of the Moredun Research Institute, the science park has attracted 20 companies to the site. The focus of Pentlands Science Park is animal bioscience but the tenants include research companies involved in pharmaceuticals, software, and environmental science. The area occupied by non-Moredun organisations is approximately 55,000 sq ft, and these tenants employ over 200 people.

== See also ==
- Animal health
- Animal science
- GALVmed
- Livestock husbandry
- Louping ill
- Scottish Agricultural Revolution
- Veterinary medicine
- Veterinary pathology

=== The Bush Estate ===
- Roslin Institute
- Royal (Dick) School of Veterinary Studies of the University of Edinburgh
- Scottish Agricultural College (SAC)

=== Other Scottish research institutes ===
- Aberdeen Research Consortium
- Easter Howgate
- Marine Directorate
- Scottish Forestry
- Inverness Campus
- James Hutton Institute
- Macaulay Institute
- Rowett Research Institute
- SASA
- Scottish Crop Research Institute
