= Frank Fasson =

Scotland international rugby union player

- Born: Francis Hamilton Fasson; 21 September 1877 Peebles, Scotland
- Died: 23 October 1955 (aged 78) Jedburgh, Scotland

Rugby union career
- Position: Half back
Amateur team(s)
Years	Team	Apps	(Points)
- Cambridge University
–	London Scottish		
–	Edinburgh Wanderers		
Provincial / State sides
Years	Team	Apps	(Points)
- Anglo-Scots
International career
Years	Team	Apps	(Points)
1900-02	Scotland	5	(0)

Francis Hamilton (Frank) Fasson was a Scotland international rugby union player. He played at Half back.

== Life ==
He was the son of Charles Hamilton Fasson MD, Superintendent of Edinburgh Royal Infirmary, by his second wife, Margaret Sarah Robertson, who died when Frank was five.

He trained as a lawyer and in 1910 is listed as Francis H. Fasson WS living at 10 Murrayfield Drive in West Edinburgh.

In the First World War he served as a Captain in the Scottish Horse regiment.

He died in Jedburgh on 23 October 1955.

== Rugby Union career ==
=== Amateur career ===
He played for Cambridge University.

He then played for London Scottish and Edinburgh Wanderers.

=== Provincial career ===
Fasson played for the Anglo-Scots in 1898.

=== International career ===
He was capped 5 times for Scotland from 1900 to 1902.

== Family ==
He married Lilias Clara Bruce and was father to Tony Fasson a hero of the Second World War.
