= Edinburgh Dental Institute =

Scottish dental teaching body of the University of Edinburgh

Coordinates: 55°56′40″N 3°11′49″W

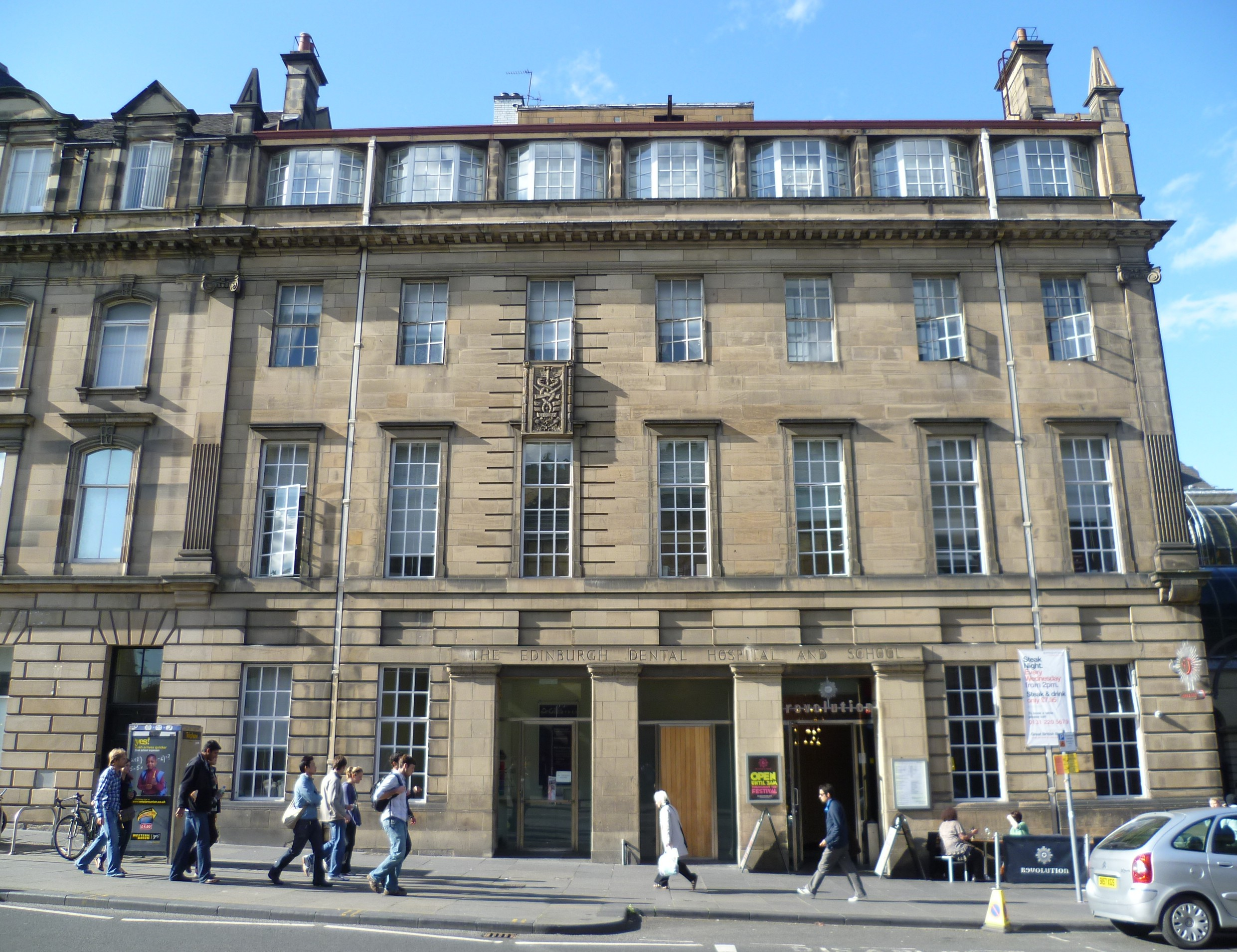
The Edinburgh Dental Hospital and School on Chambers Street, home of the organisation from 1927 to 1997

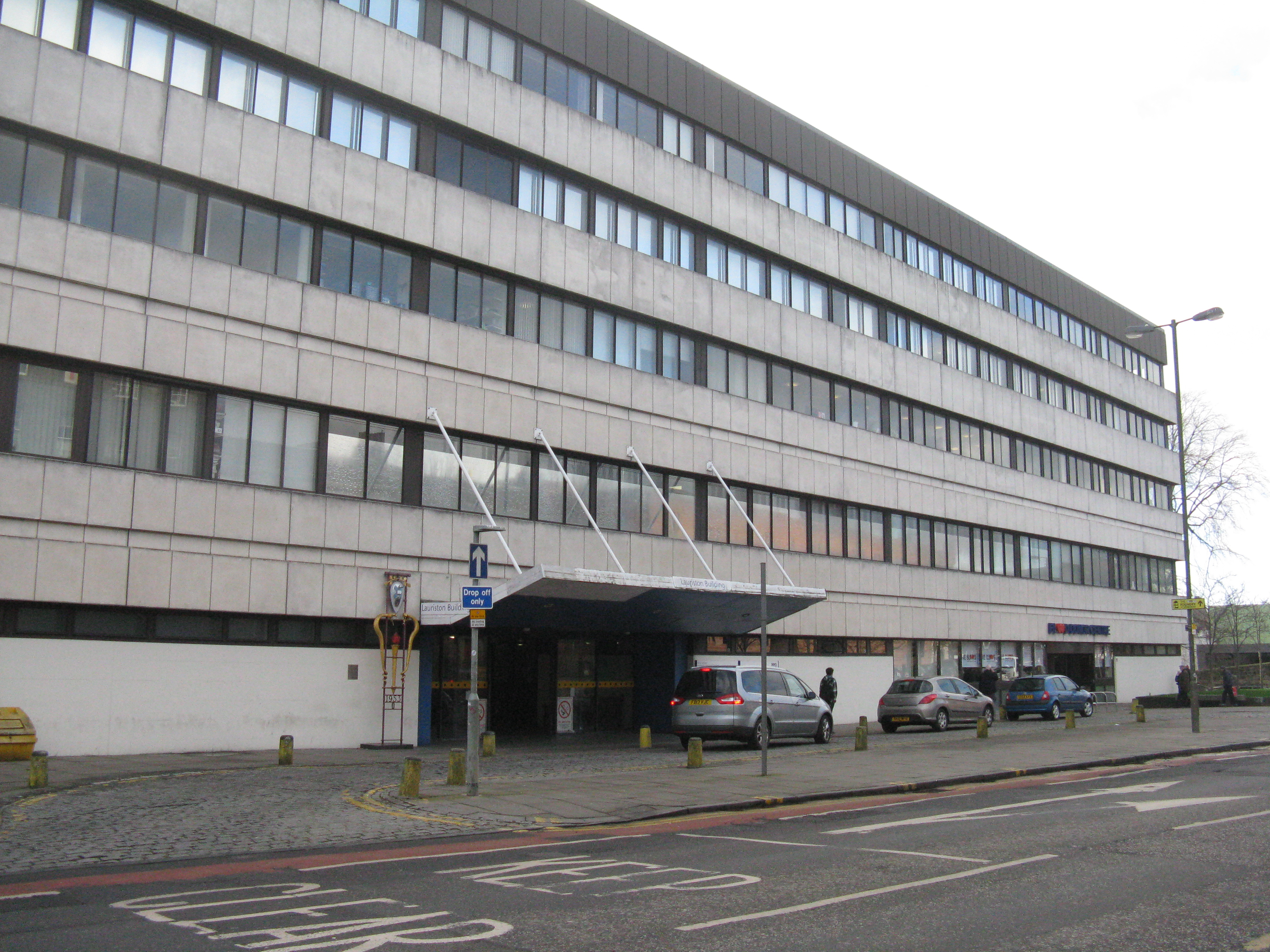
The Lauriston Building, current home of the institute

The Edinburgh Dental Institute is a teaching body based in the Lauriston Building in Lauriston Place, Edinburgh. It is affiliated with the University of Edinburgh and part of NHS Lothian, providing postgraduate dental education, clinical training, and research. Originating as the Edinburgh Dental Dispensary in 1860, it has evolved over more than a century into a centre with an international reputation for dental education and research.

== History ==
The facility was formed as the Edinburgh Dental Dispensary in January 1860, following work by Dr. John Smith and other practitioners to provide treatment of patients and training of dental students. The Dental Hospital and School was founded in 1878 and moved to Lauriston Place, property of the Royal Infirmary of Edinburgh, in 1889. Five years later, it returned to Chambers Street, and despite the adjoining building being purchased in 1903, the extension plan was postponed until 1927 when the new building was opened. In 1948 the hospital was brought under the South Eastern Regional Hospital Board, forming part of the Royal Infirmary Group. In 1974 it came under the South Lothian District of Lothian Health Board, joining the National Health Service, and it is presently part of the University Hospitals Division of NHS Lothian. The organisation moved to the Lauriston Building in 1997 and was renamed the Edinburgh Dental Institute in 1999.

== Education ==
The Edinburgh Dental Institute works with the Edinburgh Dental Education Centre in the Lauriston Building to provide education for postgraduates and training for dental teams. It has an international reputation for its research quality and works with NHS Education for Scotland and the University of Edinburgh.

== Research ==
The Edinburgh Dental institute has been publishing research since 1990, with 90 pieces being published as of April 2025, including 73 articles, 6 meeting abstracts, and 5 review articles. The most prolific year was 2018 with 10 publications, and since then there's been a decline with an average of 2 publications per year.
