= Lauriston Building =

Hospital in Edinburgh, Scotland

- NHS Lothian
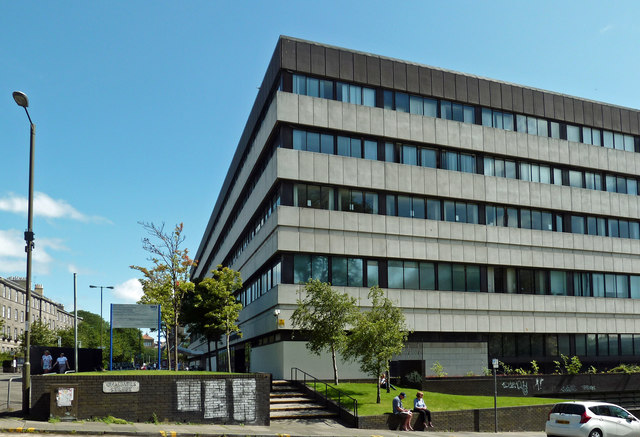
- Lauriston Building

- Shown in Edinburgh

Geography
- Location: Edinburgh, Scotland
- Coordinates: 55.9446°N 3.1968°W

Organisation
- Care system: NHS Scotland
- Type: Specialist

Services
- Speciality: Out-patient centre

Links
- Website: www.nhslothian.scot/GoingToHospital/Locations/Pages/LauristonBuilding.aspx
- Lists: Hospitals in Scotland
- Other links: List of hospitals in Scotland

The Lauriston Building is an out-patient centre in Lauriston, Edinburgh, Scotland. It is managed by NHS Lothian.

== History ==
The current building replaced a former tenement building which stood in the site, No. 33–49, which was particularly known for having suffered from aerial bombing by a German Zeppelin on 2 April 1916.

The new building, which was designed by Robert Matthew Johnson Marshall, formed part of the first phase of the intended re-development of the Royal Infirmary of Edinburgh (Note: Together with the Princess Alexandra Eye Pavilion) and was built between 1976 and 1981.

The Edinburgh Dental Institute moved to the building from Chambers Street in 1997. Since the Royal Infirmary of Edinburgh moved to Little France in 2001, the building has been used as a centre for outpatient services.

== Services ==
It is used for outpatient services by ear, nose and throat, dermatology and orthopaedic departments.
