= Edinburgh BioQuarter =

Office site in Edinburgh, Scotland

Coordinates: 55°55′19″N 3°08′11″W

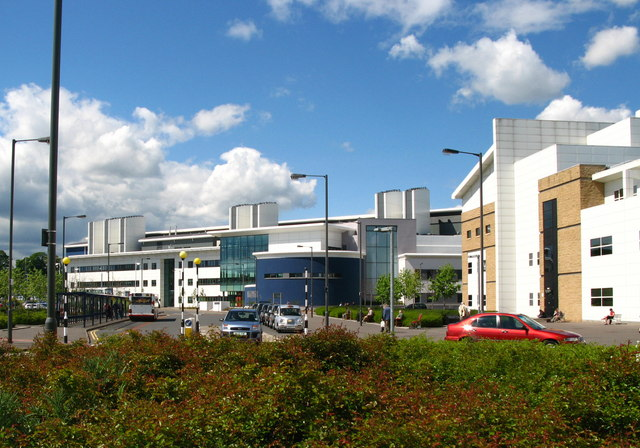
Edinburgh BioQuarter

Edinburgh BioQuarter is a cluster of life sciences organisations centred on the Royal Infirmary of Edinburgh site in Edinburgh, Scotland. Around 9,000 people work or study at the site.

== Partnership ==
BioQuarter is a partnership with the City of Edinburgh Council, NHS Lothian, Scottish Enterprise and the University of Edinburgh. The site has the University of Edinburgh’s medical research institutes. Its 160-acre site includes the University of Edinburgh Medical School, the Royal Infirmary of Edinburgh, the Royal Hospital for Children and Young People and the Department of Clinical Neurosciences.

In total, there has been a £600 million investment in capital developments. BioQuarter has generated an estimated £2.72 billion in gross value added from its research, clinical and commercial activities, and a further £320 million from its development.

== History ==
In 1997, the Scottish Government obtained planning permission for land in the Little France area of Edinburgh for a new Royal Infirmary of Edinburgh, and it was procured under a Private Finance Initiative contract in 1998. This allowed the Royal Infirmary of Edinburgh and the University of Edinburgh’s Medical School to relocate from their historic sites in Edinburgh city centre.

In 2002, NHS Lothian opened the new Royal Infirmary of Edinburgh. At the same time, the University of Edinburgh completed its first phase of relocation of the College of Medicine and Veterinary Medicine with the move of medical teaching and research to the adjacent Chancellor’s Building. In 2004, Scottish Enterprise Scotland’s economic development agency, acquired the surrounding land. In 2007, following the completion of a series of land deals that cleared a 55-acre site adjacent to the Royal Infirmary of Edinburgh, they launched the Edinburgh BioQuarter.

In August 2010, British author J.K. Rowling endowed research at BioQuarter with a £10 million gift to create the Anne Rowling Regenerative Neurology Clinic in memory of her mother, who died in 1990 from complications related to multiple sclerosis. The clinic was officially opened in October 2013.

The first commercial facility on BioQuarter, the NINE – Life Sciences Innovation Centre, was established in 2012 to house burgeoning spinouts and startup life sciences companies; this was joined in 2016 by commercial modular facilities in the form of BioCube 1 and BioCube 2.

== Developments ==
In 2035, BioQuarter was planned to be a "Health Innovation District". It also has plans to expand the city’s tram network to BioQuarter by 2030.

The pipeline of academic and clinical developments includes the Usher Institute (due to open in 2024), the co-location of Biomedical and Medical Teaching and NHS Lothian’s Princess Alexandra Eye Pavilion.

== Response to COVID-19 ==
In 2022, a multi-million-pound research programme to develop treatments for lung infections such as COVID-19 and future pandemics was announced.

== Companies ==
Companies based on Edinburgh BioQuarter include:

- RoslinCT – GMP contract manufacturing and development organisation (CMDO), originally founded as Roslin Cells in 2006.
- Fios Genomics – genomic and bioinformatics data analysis services for drug discovery & development.
- Concept Life Sciences – pre-clinical Contract Research Organisation (CRO) and acquired by Concept Life Sciences, a Malvern Panalytical brand, in 2020.
- Calcivis – dentistry imaging system.
- Edinburgh Molecular Imaging – clinical-phase biotechnology company.
- Galecto, Inc. – biotech company developing small molecules.
- LifeArc – UK-registered and self-funding charity on diagnostics and therapies.
- Resolution Therapeutics – developing macrophage cell therapies.

== See also ==
- Midlothian BioCampus, a nearby life sciences enterprise area
- Inverness Campus
