= BioCampus =

Enterprise area in Midlothian, Scotland

Coordinates: 55°51′38.93″N 3°11′19.93″W

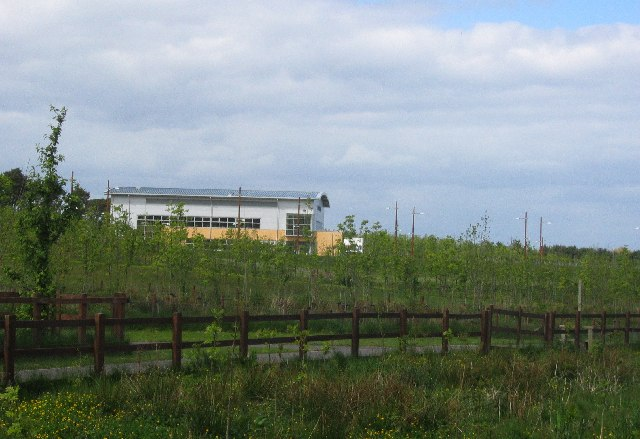
Biocampus. Across the road from the Bush Campus, another science park is being developed, this for biotech industries.

The Biocampus is an enterprise area in Midlothian, Scotland. It is part of the larger Edinburgh Science Triangle, which includes the Edinburgh BioQuarter and was the first dedicated national bio-manufacturing campus. Development on the site is supported through financial incentives and business rate reduction through the Scottish Government's enterprise area scheme.

The campus was established in 2001 with a 12-hectare (30-acre) site to facilitate large-scale biomanufacturing, with the initial development costing around £15 million. There are outline plans in place to expand the site with a further 1,400 square metres (15,000 ft^{2}) for a phase 2 project. The first facility on the campus was opened by Alba Bioscience, a subsidiary of Quotient, a company offering tests related to blood transfusion diagnostics. The firm received a Queen's Award for Enterprise in 2016 for their work in Midlothian both at the BioCampus site and the nearby Pentlands science park.

The campus has close links to a number of university departments including Heriot-Watt University, the University of Strathclyde and the University of Edinburgh.

An evaluation in 2005 estimated that enterprise zones across Scotland had generated 58,000 full time jobs at a total public cost of £17,000 per ten-year job. However, some commentators have criticised the tax breaks and financial support given to private companies through enterprise zones, highlighting evidence that very few new high-quality jobs are created with most of the jobs being transferred from other parts of the country.

== See also ==
Other life science enterprise areas in Scotland include: Edinburgh BioQuarter; Forres, Moray; Inverness Campus, Highland; and Irvine, North Ayrshire.
