= Charles Hamilton Fasson =

British surgeon and medical reformer (1821–1891)

Charles Hamilton Fasson (1821–1891) was a senior British surgeon and medical reformer.

== Life ==
He was born on 5 December 1821 at Vincent Square in London the son of John Fasson and his wife, Frances Blogg. He studied Medicine and joined the British Army as a surgeon around 1843, mainly serving in India.

He served as Surgeon General to the Indian Army during the time of the Indian Mutiny of 1857, being attached to the Light Dragoons. He appears to have been highly involved in the administration of hospitals in India.

In 1870, Edinburgh decided a new hospital should be built and in 1871 Fasson was appointed Superintendent in overall charge of the Old Edinburgh Infirmary on Drummond Street, also being appointed Deputy Surgeon General of all Scotland. The city also appointed him in charge of organising a new hospital. Campaigning with the Lord Provost and Council for a new infirmary he successfully got them to agree the new Edinburgh Royal Infirmary on Lauriston Place, built to new principles on ventilation and sanitation. This was opened in 1879 with Fasson as its first Superintendent.

In 1873, he was elected a member of the Harveian Society of Edinburgh.

He had an apoplectic seizure around 1 October and seemed to be recovering but died at 2 Meadow Walk on the Meadows close to Edinburgh Royal Infirmary, from a second seizure on 15 October 1892. He is buried to the south in Grange Cemetery, the grave lies in the eastmost section close to the main entrance.

== Family ==
He married twice, firstly in India around 1848 to Catherine Mary Young (1827-1864) born in West Bengal in India, died in Quebec in Canada. They had eight children.

He was secondly married to Margaret Sarah Robertson (d.1882) with whom he had two sons and one daughter: Robert Robertson Fasson RN; Francis Hamilton Fasson; and Cara Fasson. Through his son Francis Hamilton, he was paternal grandfather to the Second World War hero, Tony Fasson.
