= Jack Henderson (artist) =

Scottish artist (born 2004)

- Born: Jack Ieuan Rocky Henderson; 21 November 2004 (age 21); Edinburgh, Scotland

Jack Henderson (born 2004) is a Scottish artist, known for raising £64,000+ by selling his artwork as a child, which he donated to the Edinburgh-based Sick Kids Friends Foundation.

== Background ==
Henderson wanted to raise money for the Sick Kids Hospital in Edinburgh where his youngest brother Noah regularly attended with bronchiolitis. His idea was to draw 'anything' in exchange for donations to the Sick Kids Friends Foundation and he aimed to raise £100. After his idea (which he titled Jack Draws Anything) and website went viral he gained a lot of attention and picture requests. His fundraising total is now in excess of £64,000.

In 231 days, the East Lothian youngster drew 536 pictures, using 314 pens, 162 crayons and 96 pencils on 2144 sheets of paper to complete his marathon drawing task.

As of June 2014, Jack has now officially finished his fundraising efforts.

== Book ==
A book of his story and pictures was published by Hodders Children's Books in 2011, titled Jack Draws Anything. To mark the event, a new toy was designed, based on one of his drawings.

== Awards ==
Henderson and his campaign have won and been nominated for a number of awards for their fundraising and social media activities, including amongst others:

- Charity Champion at Scottish Charity Awards 2011 (Runner-up)
- Social Campaign of the Year at .net magazine Awards Awards 2011 (Winner)
- Digital Award at Institute of Fundraising Scotland 2011 (Winner)
- Child of the Year at Bighearted Scotland Awards 2011 (Winner)
- Young Fundraiser of the Year at the Justgiving Awards 2012 (Runner-up)
- Child Fundraiser of the Year at the Pride of Britain Awards 2012 (Winner) where he received his award from Rolf Harris, whom he drew a picture of on the evening to raise a further £6,000 for his fundraising.
- Jack was presented with a Special Recognition Award from the Sick Kids Friends Foundation in light of his fundraising over the last few years.

== Personal life ==
Jack is originally from Edinburgh, Scotland but moved to Prestonpans, East Lothian when he was young. In September 2012 he moved with his family to Walnut Creek, California where they resided until July 2018. He has since returned to Scotland.
