= Inverness College =

Coordinates: 57.4853°N 4.2217°W

Inverness College UHI
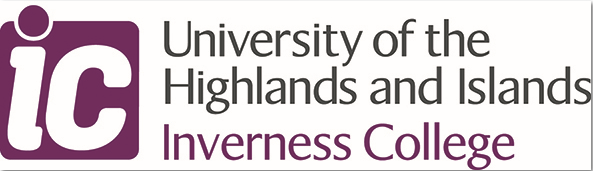
- Motto: Start Tomorrow Today
- Type: College
- Established: 1960
- Affiliations: University of the Highlands and Islands
- Principal: Professor Christopher O’Neil
- Location: Inverness, Scotland
- Campus: Inverness Campus
- Website: www.inverness.uhi.ac.uk

UHI Inverness (Scottish Gaelic: Colaiste Inbhir Nis) is one of the thirteen partners that make up the University of the Highlands and Islands, based in Inverness in the Highland council area of Scotland. A new main building at Inverness Campus was opened in August 2015, with most students and staff now located there. UHI Inverness has a second campus at The Scottish School of Forestry, based near Balloch. UHI Inverness is a tertiary organisation providing education to school pupils, and at further education, higher education and postgraduate levels, together with training for apprentices and a wide range of short courses for business. Student accommodation is also available on the new campus.

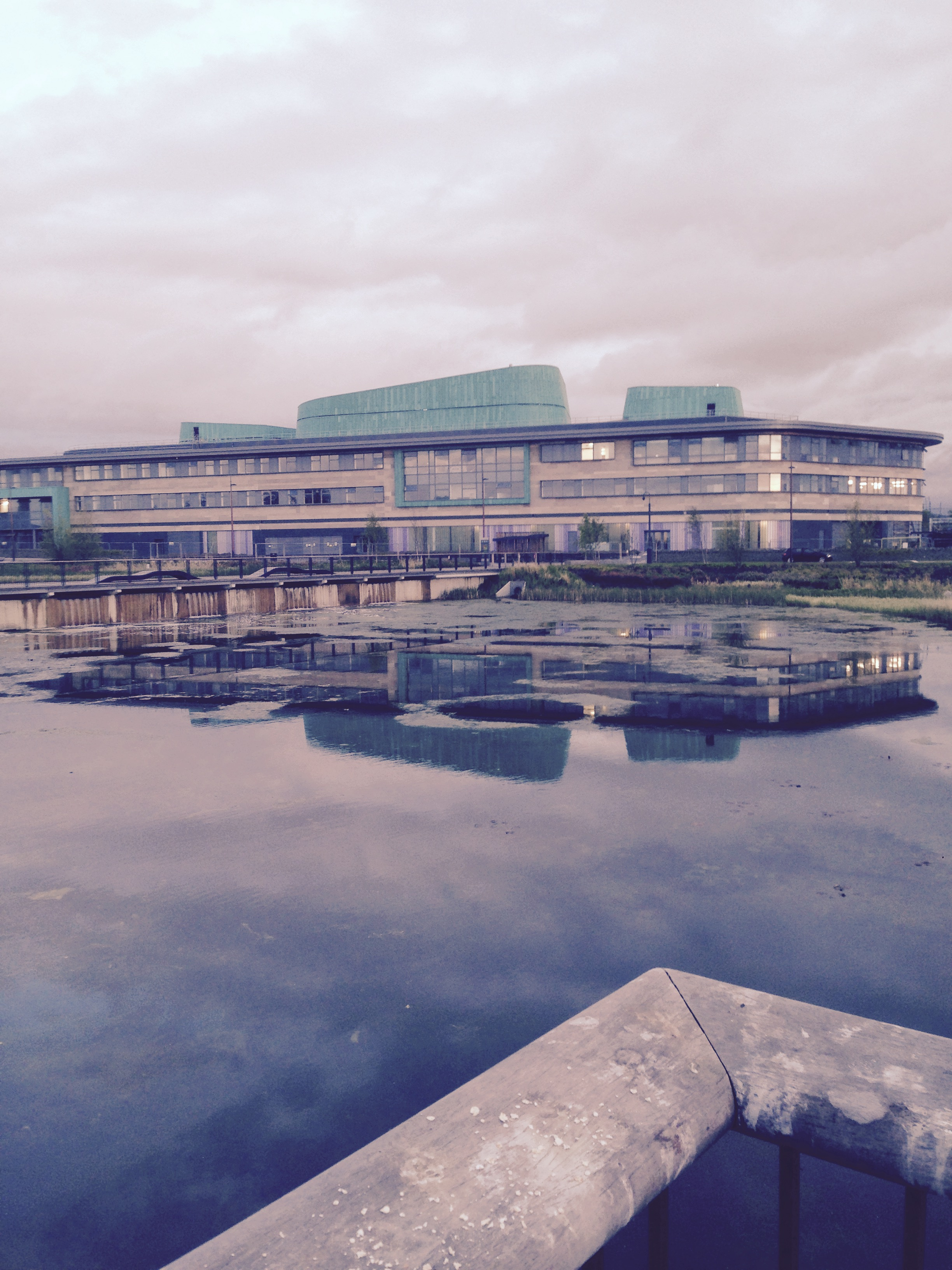
Inverness College new building, Beechwood Campus

It has more than 1,700 students studying towards degree courses. It is among the first Colleges in Scotland to deliver both Foundation and Graduate level Apprenticeships.

== New campus ==
In May 2010 it was decided that the college would move to a new purpose-built site at the Beechwood farm, co-locating with the Scottish Agricultural College, the Centre for Health Science phase 4, and a training hotel operated by a partnership between the Calman Trust and Albyn Housing. This was completed in 2015 and includes facilities for private sector research & development, investors, student accommodation, sports facilities, a community and cultural centre within landscaped parkland. The 200-acre (0.81 km^{2}) campus at Beechwood is just off the A9 south of Inverness. The principal of UHI at the time of the move, James Fraser, said: "This is a flagship development which will provide Inverness with a university campus and vibrant student life. It will have a major impact on the city and on the Highlands and Islands. UHI is a partnership of colleges and research centres throughout the region, and the development of any one partner brings strength to the whole institution." It was estimated that the new campus would contribute more than £50 million to the economy of the Highlands because it could attract innovative commercial businesses interested in research and development, while increasing the number of students who study within the city by around 3,000. The old college campus has seen been allocated for residential use.

== Governance ==
In November 2012 Diane Rawlinson was appointed as Principal and Chief-executive, taking up the post in February 2013. In June 2017, the college's board of management appointed Christopher O'Neil to become principal in the following academic year.
