= Princess Alexandra Eye Pavilion =

- NHS Lothian
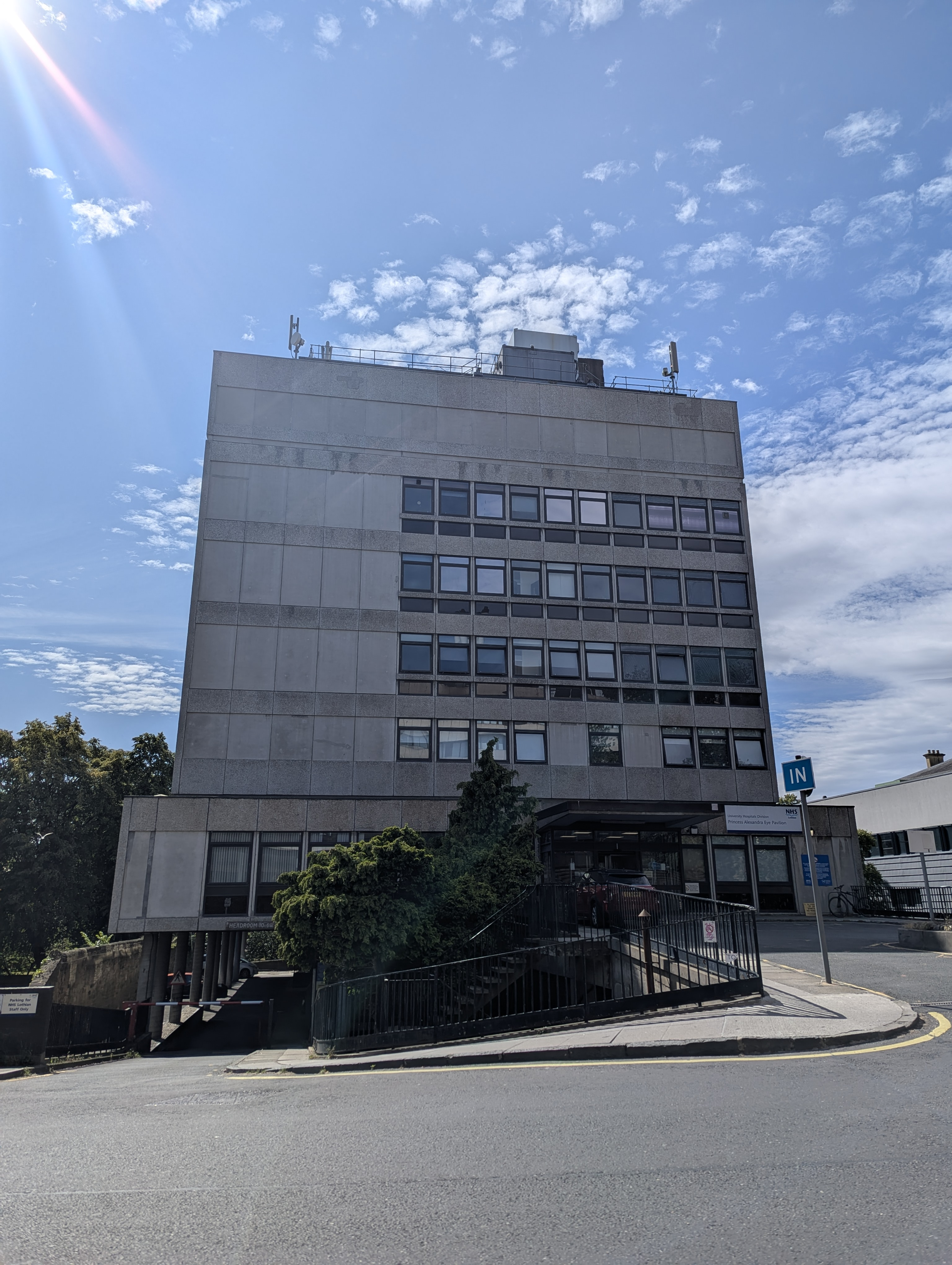
- A front-facing image of the Princess Alexandra Eye Pavilion in 2006. Taken to show the main entrance and front of the building.

- Shown in Edinburgh

Geography
- Location: Edinburgh, Scotland
- Coordinates: 55°56′39″N 3°11′54″W

Organisation
- Care system: NHS Scotland
- Type: Specialist

Services
- Speciality: Eye treatment centre

Links
- Lists: Hospitals in Scotland
- Other links: List of hospitals in Scotland

The Princess Alexandra Eye Pavilion is a specialist eye treatment centre in Edinburgh, Scotland. It is managed by NHS Lothian. It provides ophthalmic care for Edinburgh and the Lothians, and tertiary care for South East Scotland.

== History ==
The Eye Dispensary for Edinburgh was founded in 1822 on the Lawnmarket. One of the founders was John Argyll Robertson, whose son Douglas Argyll Robertson would later work on the eye ward at the Royal Infirmary of Edinburgh. In 1834 a separate Eye Infirmary was founded. Departments for Ear, Nose and Throat were subsequently added in 1883 to form the Eye, Ear and Throat Infirmary of Edinburgh. In 1922 the Infirmary and Dispensary amalgamated to combined premises on Cambridge Street.

In 1853 a new surgical hospital was built between the Royal Infirmary of Edinburgh on Infirmary Street and Surgeons' Hall, containing 19 beds for eye patients. The eye facilities were moved to the new Royal Infirmary of Edinburgh on Lauriston Place in 1870, and were expanded and moved to the purpose-built Moray Pavilion in 1903. This housed 44 beds and separate operating theatres, along with a substantial outpatient department on the ground floor.

The current building, which was designed by Alison & Hutchison, formed part of the first phase of the intended re-development of the Royal Infirmary of Edinburgh (Note: Together with the Lauriston Building) and was built between 1965 and 1969. The departments at the Moray Pavilion and the Eye, Ear and Throat Infirmary were amalgamated at the new site. The building was named the Princess Alexandra Eye Pavilion in honour of Princess Alexandra, who officially opened the hospital on 1 October 1969.

In 2005, then-Chancellor Gordon Brown became the patron of a centre of excellence within the Eye Pavilion. Brown had received treatment there himself in the 1970s after suffering a detached retina of his right eye in a game of rugby.

NHS Lothian announced in July 2018 that a full business case would be developed with a view to moving the eye department to new premises at the BioQuarter campus adjacent to the current Royal Infirmary of Edinburgh site at Little France.

== Services ==
The Princess Alexandra Eye Pavilion specialises in treatment and care of conditions affecting the eye. The hospital contains one in-patient ward, two day wards, three intraocular operating theatres, extraocular surgery and procedure facilities, outpatient clinics and an acute referral clinic for emergency treatment.
