= GALVmed =

Not-for-profit partnership

- Founded: 2004
- Type: Public-private partnership; registered charity in Scotland, England and Wales
- Headquarters: Edinburgh, Scotland
- Website: galvmed.org

The Global Alliance for Livestock Veterinary Medicines (GALVmed), formerly the Global Alliance for Livestock Vaccines (GALV), is a not-for-profit livestock health product development and access partnership. It operates as a public-private partnership and a UK registered charity headquartered in Edinburgh.

GALVmed’s purpose is "protecting livestock, improving human lives" and its mission is to improve the livelihoods of resource-poor farmers by providing animal health tools within a sustainable economic framework.

The intended beneficiaries of GALVmed’s work are many of the 900 million people worldwide who rely on livestock for their livelihoods.

== History ==
Originally GALVmed was known as the Global Alliance for Livestock Vaccines (GALV). GALV was founded in 2004. Earlier, in the early 2000s, scoping work under the DFID Animal Health Programme (AHP), identified the need for an organisation to promote the creation of a consortium to invest in research to produce livestock vaccines, diagnostics and other products for the control of tropical livestock diseases, which the private pharmaceutical sector was not funding at the time. As a result, the AHP went on to facilitate the establishment of GALV with an appropriate legal and institutional framework and its first business plan. It was envisaged that GALV would work in a similar way to the GAVI Alliance a similar organisation but with a human health agenda.

The inception phase of GALV ran from October 2004 to March 2005. It was funded through a £300,000 grant from DFID with the objective of establishing a global public-private partnership to develop new vaccines against diseases that inflict the livestock of poor people.

Following the brief inception phase, DFID provided GALV (later GALVmed) with core and project funding totalling UK£5.6 million during the period April 2005 to November 2011. Of this total, £3 million was joint funding in partnership with the Bill & Melinda Gates Foundation (BMGF)for phase 1 of what is now known as the Global Alliance for Livestock Veterinary Medicines (GALVmed). This change of name reflected the recognition by GALV/GALVmed’s management and board that although vaccines were important, the development of other types of veterinary medicines, including drugs, would also be relevant in some cases. Together DFID and BMGF provided a total of £20 million for phase 1, which was scheduled to run from September 2008 until August 2015.

Throughout GALVmed phase 1, the organisation had as its mission statement and strapline "protecting livestock, saving human life" (PLSHL).Known as the PLSHL project, protecting livestock reflected the predominant focus on preventive veterinary medicines, especially vaccines, while saving human life indicated that two of the four key diseases GALVmed was targeting were zoonotic. The stated goal for phase 1 was to improve the health of livestock and increase food security and human health of poor livestock keepers in low-income countries. During phase 1, GALVmed focused on four key diseases: East Coast fever (ECF) that affects cattle, Rift Valley fever (RVF)that affects cattle, sheep, goats, camels and also people, porcine cysticercosis, that affects pigs and also people, and Newcastle disease, that affects poultry.

For these diseases, GALVmed and partners aimed to identify suitable mechanisms for the development of control tools (vaccines, diagnostics and pharmaceuticals) and to facilitate their access and adoption. They also aimed to develop data-driven decision making tools and to communicate, network and support advocacy and global access strategy requirements of project delivery.

The PLSHL project also comprised funding to assess existing vaccines and diagnostics on a further three diseases: contagious caprine pleuropneumonia (CCPP), that is a sheep and goat disease, contagious bovine pleuropneumonia(CBPP), that is a cattle disease and peste des petits ruminants (PPR), which is sheep and goat disease. In addition, exploratory activities were undertaken on African swine fever.

By the end of phase 1, DFID reported that GALVmed and partners had made four vaccines available to poor livestock keepers. Two vaccines, one for the tick-borne cattle disease ECF and one emergency vaccine for the cattle, sheep and goat disease RVF, were reported to be already in wide use in Africa.

In view of the progress made during GALVmed phase 1, DFID and BMGF decided to jointly fund GALVmed phase 2, scheduled to run from 2012 to 2017. For phase 2, DFID and BMGF jointly committed to providing over £31.3 million (USD 51.5million)with DFID contributing 20 percent and BMGF 80 percent.

Initially, phase 2 operated under the "protecting livestock, saving human life" mission and banner used for phase 1. In early 2014, this was amended to "protecting livestock, improving human lives" to reflect the increased emphasis on delivery and livelihoods. The focus for phase 2 was diseases that affect primarily the cattle, sheep, goats and chickens of poor farmers in sub-Saharan Africa and South Asia. Specific diseases targeted were Newcastle disease, RVF, CBPP, ECF and CCPP. Furtherwork on porcine cysticercosis was funded exclusively by DFID as pig diseases were not a target for BMGF funding.

In commenting on the awarding of the phase 2 grant, the UK International Development Secretary, Andrew Mitchell, explained that, “GALVmed has pioneered work to identify vaccines, medicine and early diagnostic solutions to tackle some of the most devastating livestock diseases that affect poor farmers in the developing world. This new funding from the British taxpayer and from the Bill & Melinda Gates Foundation will ensure that these innovative solutions are produced at scale and that solutions can get to those who need them most, at an affordable price.”

As of 2014, GALVmed is one of only two British-based charities supported by the Gates Foundation. In August 2014, Bill Gates visited GALVmed’s Edinburgh office to see and hear first-hand the progress being made by GALVmed.

Apart from the completed phase 1 and ongoing phase 2 PLSHL projects, GALVmed conceived and was a partner in the Vaccines for the Control of Neglected Animal Diseases in Africa (VACNADA) project, which ran from 2010 to 2011.

The €20million VACNADA project, funded by the European Union Food Facility and with overall coordination of the implementing partners by the African Union-Interafrican Bureau for Animal Resources (AU-IBAR), was an intervention aimed to enhance food security through reducing the impact of animal disease by increasing access to and use of quality vaccines. Other partners included the African Union Panafrican Veterinary Vaccine Centre (AU-PANVAC) and the centre de coopération internationale enrechercheagronomique pour le développement (CIRAD).

GALVmed led the implementation of a VACNADA component to improve the capacity of eight African laboratories to make quality assured vaccines in more efficient ways that met internationally recognised quality standards and best practices. Staff from selected national vaccine producing laboratories, identified through a needs assessment, received training in laboratory and vaccine operation management, had their laboratory facilities upgraded and technical support provided for the implementation of quality assurance and standardisation of the production process of selected vaccines.

In 2011, DFID awarded GALVmed an additional grant worth £8,010,708 to support the development of an integrated package of tools and policies and implement it as a cost effective control of animal African trypanosomosis (AAT). The objective was to develop a new robust field diagnostic tool for AAT, new trypanocidal drugs and to establish the basis for the development of a vaccine for AAT. The Controlling AAT project was scheduled to run until February 2014.

The DFID funding for AAT was subsequently complemented by a grant worth US$ 1,421,722 awarded by BMGF in January 2014 to undergo Phase 2 of the project. The stated purpose of the BMGF grant was to develop safe and effective drugs against drug-resistant AAT as well as a diagnostic test for field diagnosis of infection in cattle and to improve the quality control of existing trypanocidal drugs used by smallholder livestock keepers in sub-Saharan Africa.

GALVmed is also part of the consortium awarded US$ 1.8 million by the Bill & Melinda Gates Foundation for the Contagious Bovine Pleuropneumonia BEN-1 Vaccine Evaluation project. The project is exploring the potential efficacy of a vaccine to combat contagious bovine pleuropneumonia which is a major constraint to cattle production in many areas of sub-Saharan Africa where 18 countries are reported to be affected by this disease.

== Organisation ==
GALVmed is a company limited by guarantee and a registered charity in both Scotland, England and Wales. Its head office is located in Edinburgh, Scotland. GALVmed has regional offices in New Delhi and Nairobi, and project offices in South Africa and Botswana. GALVmed has 43 staff members and long-term consultants in addition to advisors and contracted consultants. It has more than 200 active partnerships. GALVmed is governed by a board made up of 11 trustees, recruited for their individual skills and experiences. The board provides strategic oversight and is in turn overseen by Members who are drawn from a wide range of public bodies, private institutions including pharmaceutical companies, and non-governmental organisations.

== Focus of work ==
GALVmed is currently supporting activities in 15 African countries and also India and Nepal. In addition, product development activities are taking place in Europe, Asia, North & Latin America and Australia.

GALVmed is currently working on 12 viral, bacterial and protozoal diseases that affect cattle, sheep and goats, pigs and poultry, some of which are zoonotic. The 12 diseases are:

Cattle diseases:

- East Coast fever (Theileriosis)
- Contagious bovine pleuropneumonia
- Trypanosomosis
- Lumpy skin disease

Sheep and goats diseases:

- Peste des petits ruminants
- Contagious caprinepleuropneumonia
- Sheep & goat pox
- Brucellosis

Pigs diseases:

- Porcine cysticercosis (zoonotic)
- African swine fever

Poultry diseases:

- Newcastle disease

Multi-species diseases:

- Rift Valley fever (zoonotic)

Twenty different veterinary products are currently being actively worked upon at various stages in the exploratory-proof of concept-development-registration-commercialization continuum: 11 vaccines, 4 pharmaceutical and 2 diagnostic products.

== Key projects ==
Newcastle disease: One of GALVmed’s projects has focused on the prevention of Newcastle disease in the chickens kept by poor women in Nepal. GALVmed, in partnership with the NGO Heifer International Nepal, has established a vaccine supply system that has transformed backyard poultry keeping. Whereas previously these women regularly lost 90 percent of their small flocks to the disease, now, thanks to vaccination, they have built up profitable small-scale enterprises. These have not only enabled them to pay their children’s school fees and meet medical bills, but have also empowered the women who report that they now enjoy more respect from their husbands.

Vaccination is carried out by trained community animal health workers who buy vaccines and offer vaccination services to the women on payment of a small fee. Following a recent assessment of the project, the BMGF concluded that, “This is possibly the easiest, quickest and most economic way of reaching out to the poor of the world with visible results in helping alleviate poverty.”

In 2015, GALVmed announced it was to bring Newcastle disease vaccination to 100,000 backyard poultry farmers in the Mayurbhanj district of Orissa, India. In partnership with Hester Biosciences Limited, GALVmed will use the thermostable Lasota vaccine for Newcastle disease. Although this vaccine needs to be transported and stored at 2-8 degrees Celsius, at village-level, it can be kept in room temperature for 10 days at 37 degrees Celsius. This means that the 237 local vaccinators will be able to stock up on the vaccine and not need to make frequent trips to the retailer for fresh stocks.

East Coast fever: From the outset a major focus of GALVmed’s work has been ECF. GALVmed has invested heavily in providing infrastructure and business and technical support to the Centre for Tick and Tick Borne Diseases in Lilongwe, Malawi. In December 2014, CTTBD became the African Union centre of excellence in ECF vaccine production within Africa when it began production on the Muguga Cocktail vaccine against ECF. The one-shot-for-life vaccine will help protect 25 million cattle across 11 countries. The Muguga Cocktail ECF vaccine was originally developed by the International Livestock Research Institute (ILRI) and its predecessor, the International Laboratory for Research on Animal Diseases (ILRAD) and the Kenya Agricultural Research institute – now known as the Kenya Agricultural and Livestock Research Organization (KALRO).

== Key partnerships ==
Partnerships are central to GALVmed’s approach; it currently has 200 active partnerships. Some key public and private sector partnerships include those between GALVmed and:

African Union: GALVmed collaborates closely with the African Union Commission (AUC) and also the specialised technical offices of AU-PANVAC, Pan African Tsetse and Trypanosomiasis Eradication Campaign (AU-PATTEC), the Inter-African Bureau for Animal Resources (AU-IBAR) and Centre for Ticks and Tick-Borne Diseases in Lilongwe, Malawi (AU-CTTBD).

Anacor Pharmaceuticals Inc, USA: GALVmed is funding research to leverage Anacor’s boron chemistry platform to develop novel compounds for the treatment of animal African trypanosomiasis.

FAO: A Memorandum of Understanding signed between the Food and Agriculture Organisation of the United Nations (FAO) formalised the collaboration between the two organisations with regard to matters related to research into livestock vaccines, quality of pharmaceuticals and diagnostic products and services; and the development and delivery of those products and services.

Hester Biosciences, India: Hester is working with GALVmed to market its thermostable Newcastle disease vaccine in India. The two partners are aiming to create a sustainable distribution network which is linked with Hester's current network. A sales team of 85 people will be created, while the firms will select and train 'vaccinators' from within communities for door-step delivery of the product.

Sidai Africa Ltd, Kenya: GALVmed is working with Sidai, a registered company in Kenya that aims to deliver high quality and affordable veterinary and other livestock services through a network of 150 branded franchises. The aim of the partnership is to improve access to the ECF Muguga Cocktail vaccine.

University of Greenwich, Medway Centre for Pharmaceutical Science, UK: GALVmed is supporting research, development and testing of novel medications to treat AAT.

University of Melbourne, Australia and Indian Immunologicals Limited: A GALVmed supported work programme for porcine cysticercosis aims to provide the tools to be used in pigs that are needed to enable eradication of the disease. This includes a vaccine which can prevent infection and a medicine to eliminate infections in pigs, combined with increasing awareness about the risk factors and measures to address public hygiene. A candidate vaccine, TSOL 18, identified by Professor Marshall Lightowlers, has been selected and work is now progressing on process development, scale up and validation, transfer to large-scale production, and preparation of a dossier and regulatory action.

== Policies ==
GALVmed has published its policies and strategies covering a number of topics and issues, including: GALVmed gender policy; commercialisation policy; approaches to meet the demand for Newcastle disease vaccine for backyard poultry sector in India; and GALVmed impetus strategy paper. It also has a position paper on ECF. In addition GALVmed, together with GALVmed and Inocul8, part of the Moredun Group, have developed Vetvac, a free to use, searchable database of commercially available livestock vaccines found globally.
