= Inverness Campus =

Coordinates: 57.476°N 4.182°W

The Inverness Campus is an area in Inverness, Scotland. 5.5 hectares of the site have been designated as an enterprise area for life sciences by the Scottish Government. This designation is intended to encourage research and development in the field of life sciences, by providing incentives to locate at the site.

The enterprise area is part of a larger site, over 200 acres, which will house Inverness College, Scotland's Rural College (SRUC), the University of the Highlands and Islands, a health science centre and sports and other community facilities. The purpose built research hub will provide space for up to 30 staff and researchers, allowing better collaboration.

The Highland Science Academy will be located on the site, a collaboration formed by Highland Council, employers and public bodies. The academy will be aimed towards assisting young people to gain the necessary skills to work in the energy, engineering and life sciences sectors.

== History ==
The site was identified in 2006. Work started to develop the infrastructure on the site in early 2012. A virtual tour was made available in October 2013 to help mark Doors Open Day.

The construction had reached halfway stage in May 2014, meaning that it is on track to open doors to receive its first students in August 2015.

In May 2014, work was due to commence on a building designed to provide office space and laboratories as part of the campus's "life science" sector. Morrison Construction have been appointed to undertake the building work.

Scotland's Rural College (SRUC) will be able to relocate their Inverness-based activities to the Campus. SRUC's research centre for Comparative Epidemiology and Medicine, and Agricultural Business Consultancy services could co-locate with UHI where their activities have complementary themes.

By the start of 2017, there were more than 600 people working at the site.

In June 2021, a new bridge opened connecting Inverness Campus to Inverness Shopping Park. It crosses the Aberdeen–Inverness railway line and is open to pedestrians, cyclists, buses, but not cars.

== See also ==
- Midlothian BioCampus
- Edinburgh BioQuarter
