= Royal Hospital for Sick Children, Edinburgh =

Royal Hospital for Sick Children
- NHS Lothian
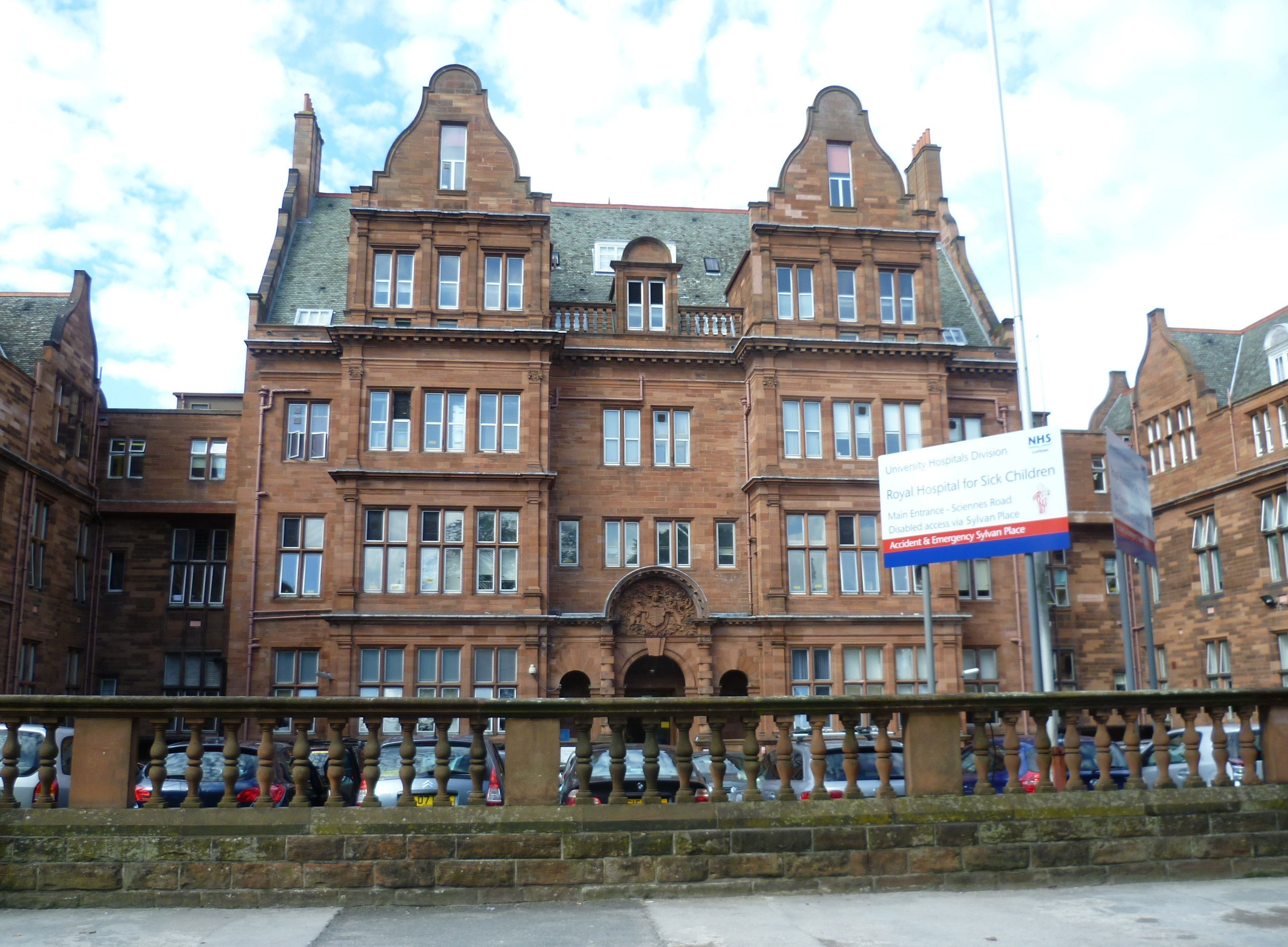

- Shown in Edinburgh

Geography
- Location: Edinburgh, Scotland
- Coordinates: 55°56′18″N 3°11′20″W

Organisation
- Care system: NHS Scotland
- Type: Teaching hospital, specialist
- Affiliated university: University of Edinburgh

Services
- Emergency department: Yes

History
- Founded: 1860; 1863 (Royal Charter)

Links
- Lists: Hospitals in Scotland

The Royal Hospital for Sick Children was a hospital in Sciennes, Edinburgh, Scotland, specialising in paediatric healthcare. Locally, it was commonly referred to simply as the "Sick Kids". The hospital provided emergency care for children from birth to their 13th birthday, including a specialist Accident and Emergency facility. Some in-patient specialties saw children up to their 16th birthday. The hospital was located on Sciennes Road in the Sciennes area of Edinburgh's South Side and was managed by NHS Lothian. It moved in 2021 to the new Royal Hospital for Children and Young People in Little France.

== History ==
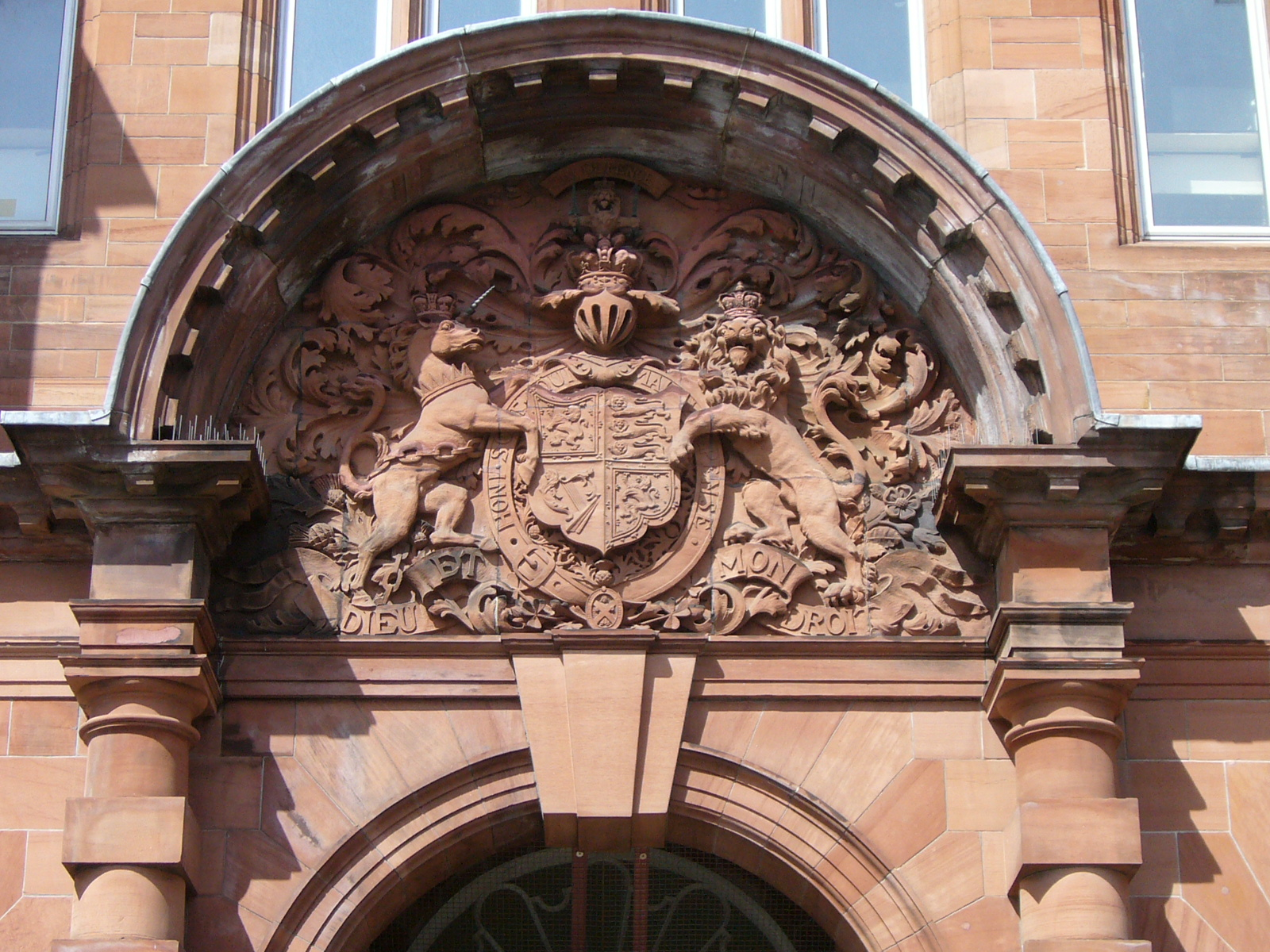
Royal Arms carving over the main entrance

The hospital, which opened at 7 Lauriston Lane in 1860, was the first dedicated children's hospital in Scotland. It received a royal charter in 1863, when it moved to the Meadowside House. The conversion of the house into a hospital was carried out by the architect David Macgibbon. In 1890 an outbreak of typhoid forced a temporary removal to Plewlands House, Morningside, and Meadowside House was subsequently sold.

The site of the Trades Maiden Hospital (established by Mary Erskine) at Rillbank was bought in the early 1890s, and plans for a new hospital were put in hand to designs by George Washington Browne. The Sciennes Road building, which cost £50,000, was opened by Princess Beatrice on 31 October 1895.

The hospital joined the National Health Service in 1948. The First Minister, Nicola Sturgeon, visited it in November 2014.

In February 2015 construction work began on the Royal Hospital for Children and Young People at Little France, which replaced the hospital in 2021. A video Mail Porter was commissioned in 2015 from filmmaker Sandie Jamieson, with music scored by Derek Williams to commemorate the closing of the Sciennes site.

In December 2016 the existing site was offered for sale as a development opportunity with the expectation of significant interest. In September 2017 NHS Lothian decided to sell the site to the Downing Group, a Liverpool-based property developer.

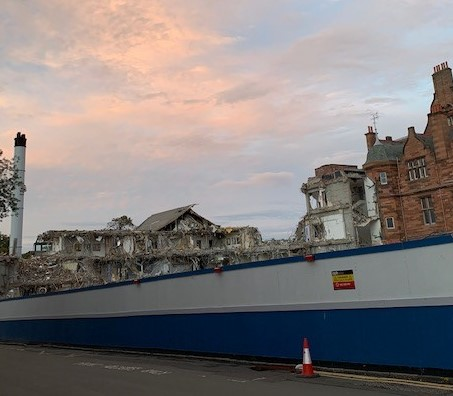
Site Demolition 2021

The Royal Hospital for Sick Children closed on 23 March 2021. The Downing Group started work on the redevelopment of the site in June 2021.

== Fundraising ==
In 2011, 6-year old Jack Henderson started an initiative to raise money for the hospital that cared for his brother, by selling drawings he had created. He originally planned to raise £100, but quickly raised £10,000. A book, Jack Draws Anything, was published in October 2011. After 3 years the fundraising total exceeded £64,000 and the project was brought to an end in June 2014.

== Architecture and art of the Sciennes site ==
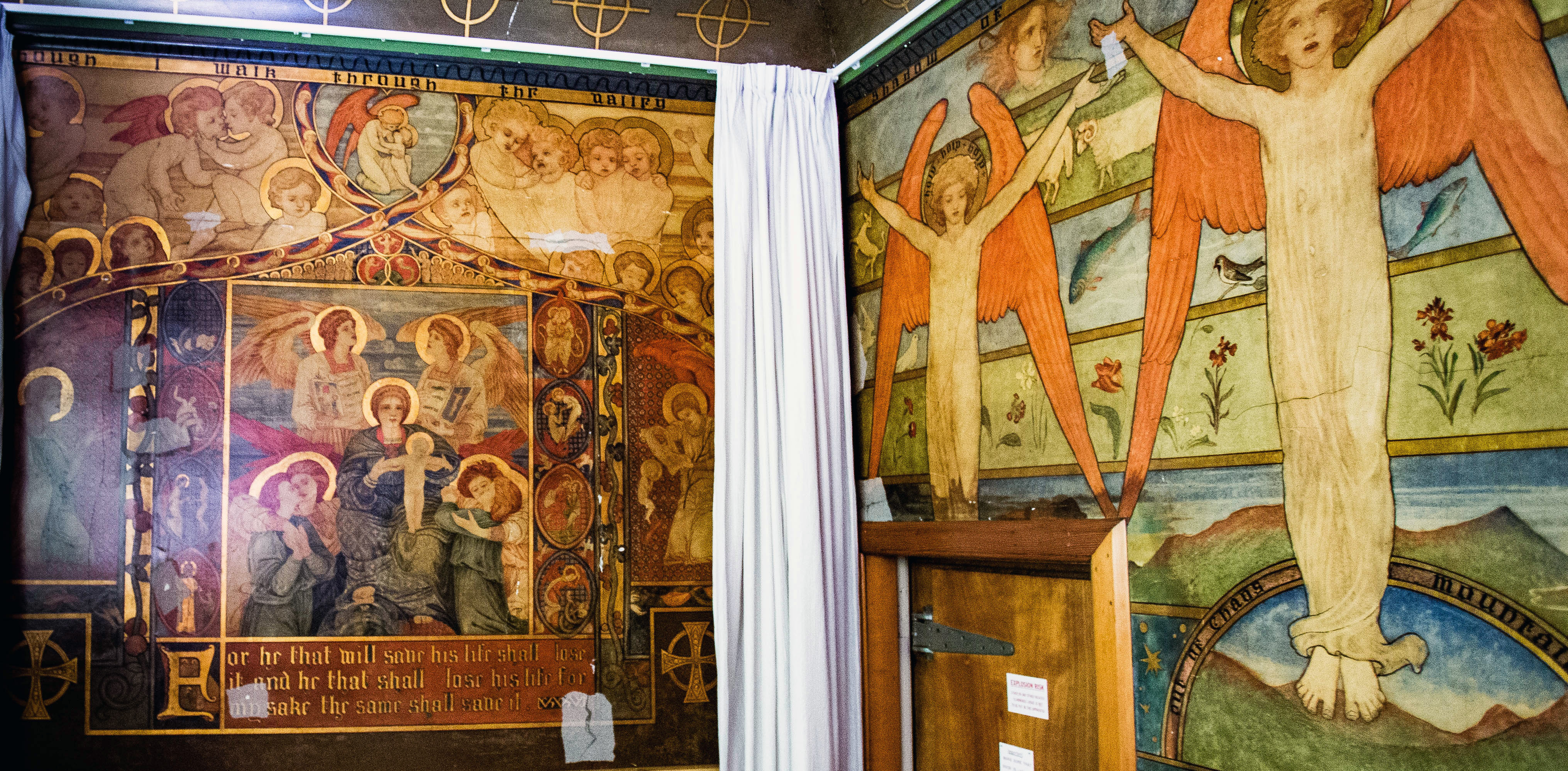
View of the Mortuary Chapel Murals by Phoebe Anna Traquair

Some of the buildings that make up the hospital at the Sciennes Road site have listed building status designated by Historic Environment Scotland.

- The main George Washington Browne building is designated as category B.
- The mortuary chapel (also by Washington Browne) is designated as category A as it contains a mural scheme by the Arts and Crafts artist Phoebe Anna Traquair.

Picture tiles, manufactured by Doulton, decorated walls of wards. They depicted nursery rhymes, fairy tales and country scenes.
