= Sciennes =

Suburb of Edinburgh, Scotland

Coordinates: 55°56′18.65″N 3°11′12.75″W

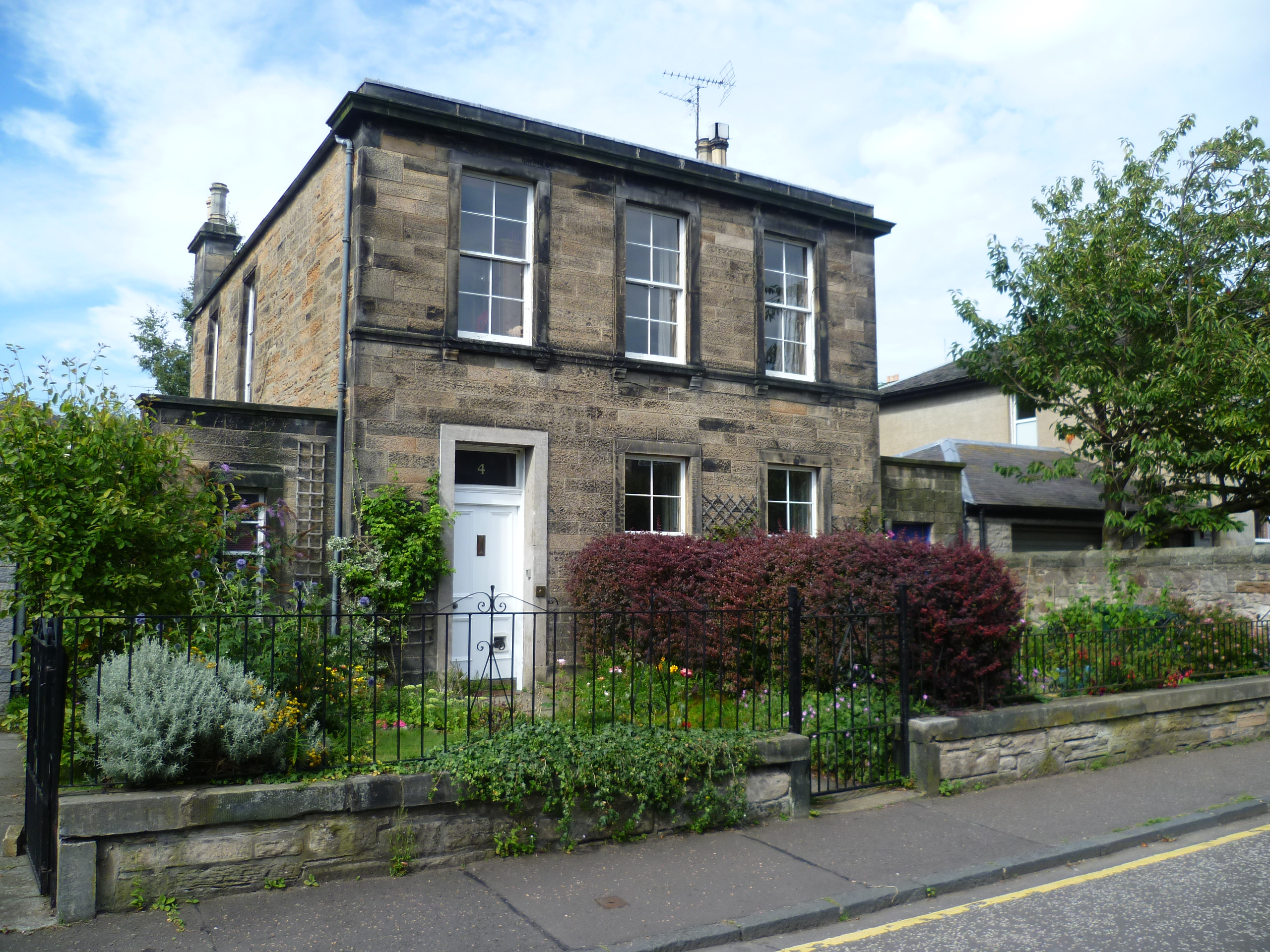
- A house in Sciennes Gardens

- Location within the City of Edinburgh council area Location within Scotland
- Population: Unknown
- OS grid reference: NT258723
- Council area: City of Edinburgh
- Country: Scotland
- Sovereign state: United Kingdom
- Post town: Edinburgh
- Postcode district: EH9
- Dialling code: 0131
- Police: Scotland
- Fire: Scottish
- Ambulance: Scottish
- UK Parliament: Edinburgh South
- Scottish Parliament: Edinburgh Southern

Sciennes (SHEENZ, /ˈʃiːnz/) is a district of Edinburgh, Scotland, situated approximately two kilometres (1 1/4 miles) south of the city centre. It is a mainly residential district, although it is also well known as the site of the former Royal Hospital for Sick Children. Most of its housing stock consists of terraces of four-storey Victorian tenements. The district is popular with students, thanks to its proximity to the University of Edinburgh. Its early history is linked to the presence in the area of the 16th-century Convent of St Catherine of Scienna, from which the district derives its name.

== Location ==
Sciennes is located approximately two kilometres (1 1/4 miles) south of Princes Street in Edinburgh's city centre, and immediately south of The Meadows. The district is not an administrative unit or electoral ward and therefore has no formal boundaries, but it is generally considered to be the area that lies between Melville Drive to the north, Argyle Place to the west, Sciennes Road to the south, and Causewayside to the east, with an extension to the south east which takes in Sciennes Hill Place and Sciennes Gardens.

Sciennes shares a community council with Marchmont and lies partly within the Marchmont, Meadows and Bruntsfield Conservation Area.

Sciennes is also the name of a road which runs north to south in the eastern part of the district.

== History ==
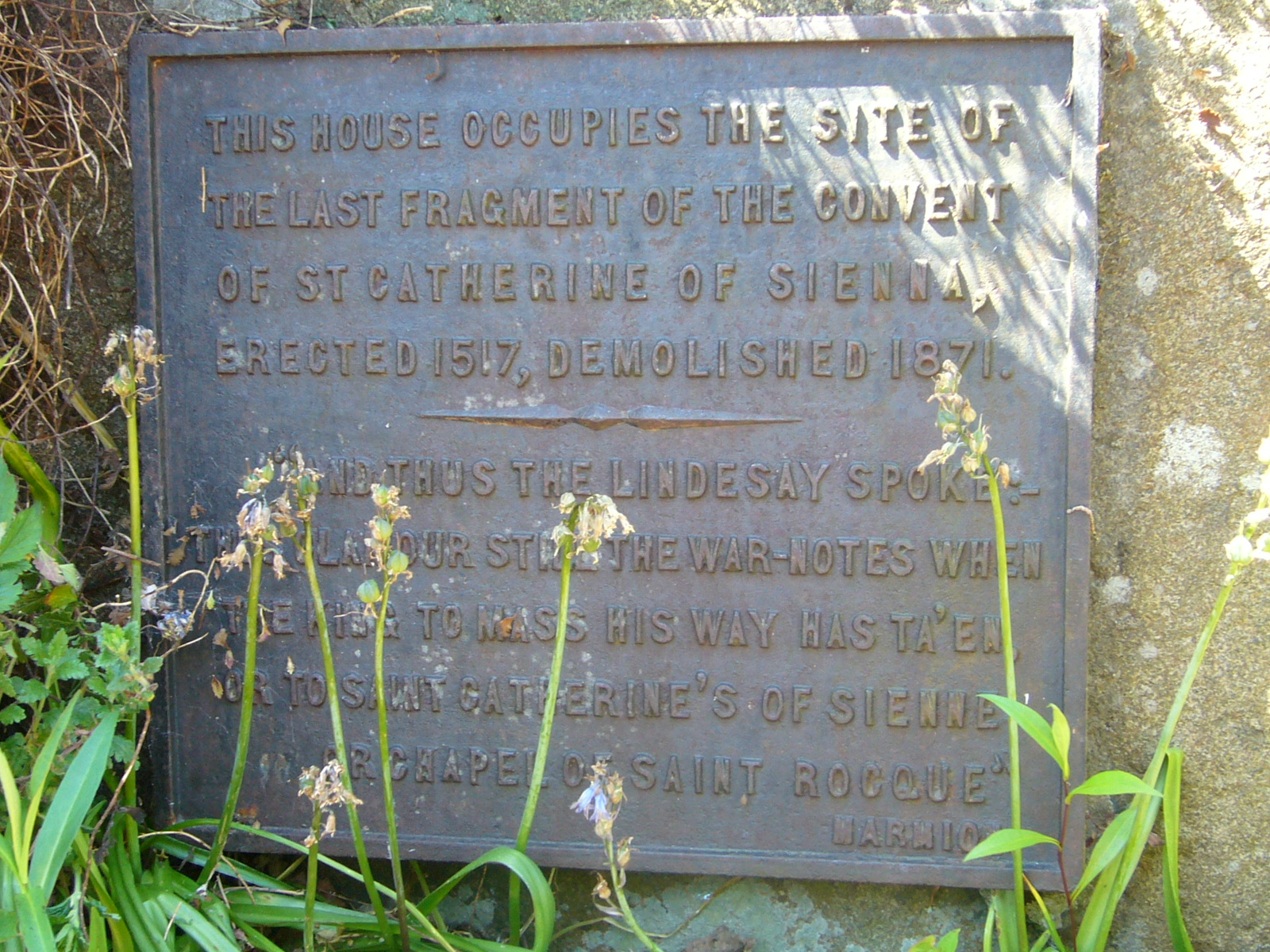
St. Catherine's Convent plaque

The recorded history of Sciennes starts in the early 16th century, with the establishment of two religious houses. In 1512, Sir John Crawfurd, canon of St Giles, erected a chapel dedicated to St John the Baptist and St John the Evangelist on land that had been part of the ancient Burgh Muir, this being common ground that was given to Edinburgh by David I in the first half of the 12th century.

The name is a corruption of Sienna in Italy, and comes from the Dominican Convent of St Catherine of Scienna. This was founded by a group of women, led by Lady Janet Seton, whose husbands and other relatives had been killed at the Battle of Flodden in 1513. The convent, which was completed in 1518, was built on land acquired from Sir John Crawfurd, and incorporated his chapel. It stood on the south side of the present Sciennes Road, roughly where St Catherine's Place now stands. It was the only Dominican Nunnery in Scotland. In 1567, the convent was destroyed and the community dispersed as a result of the Reformation.

A plaque on the wall of No 16 St Catherine's Place marks the site of the convent.

Up until the early 19th century, much of the area of present-day Sciennes was occupied by just a few mansions and large villas, each set in its own grounds. By the end of the century, these had largely been replaced by terraces of Victorian tenements. In contrast to neighbouring Marchmont, where the tenements had been developed according to an overall design, those in Sciennes grew up in a more piecemeal fashion.

The area also included some industrial development, notably the extensive engineering works and foundry of Bertrams Ltd, an international manufacturer of paper-making machinery. The works stood on the corner of Sciennes Road and (the street named) Sciennes. They were demolished in 1985, the site now being occupied by residential flats.

=== Origins of street names ===
The Convent of St Catherine of Scienna gives its name to Sciennes itself and to several of its streets (such as Sciennes Road and Sciennes Gardens) as well as to St Catherine's Place. Other streets in the district, especially those that were developed in the 19th century, are named after notable figures of the day. These include Livingstone Place, for the explorer, David Livingstone; Gladstone Terrace, for William Ewart Gladstone, the Liberal Prime Minister; and Lord Russell Place, for Lord John Russell, a Whig and Liberal Prime Minister.

== Notable buildings ==
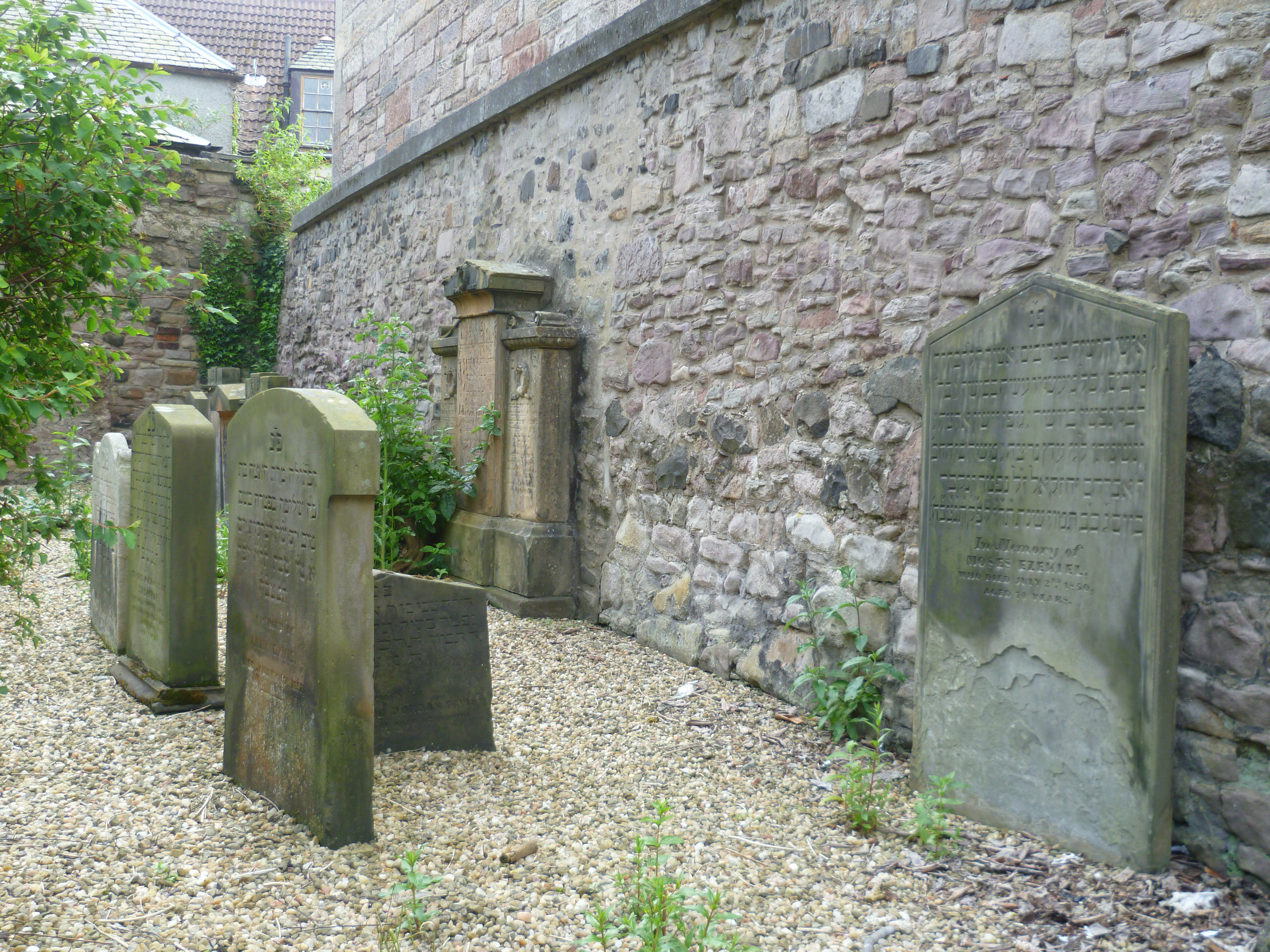
Old Jewish burial ground

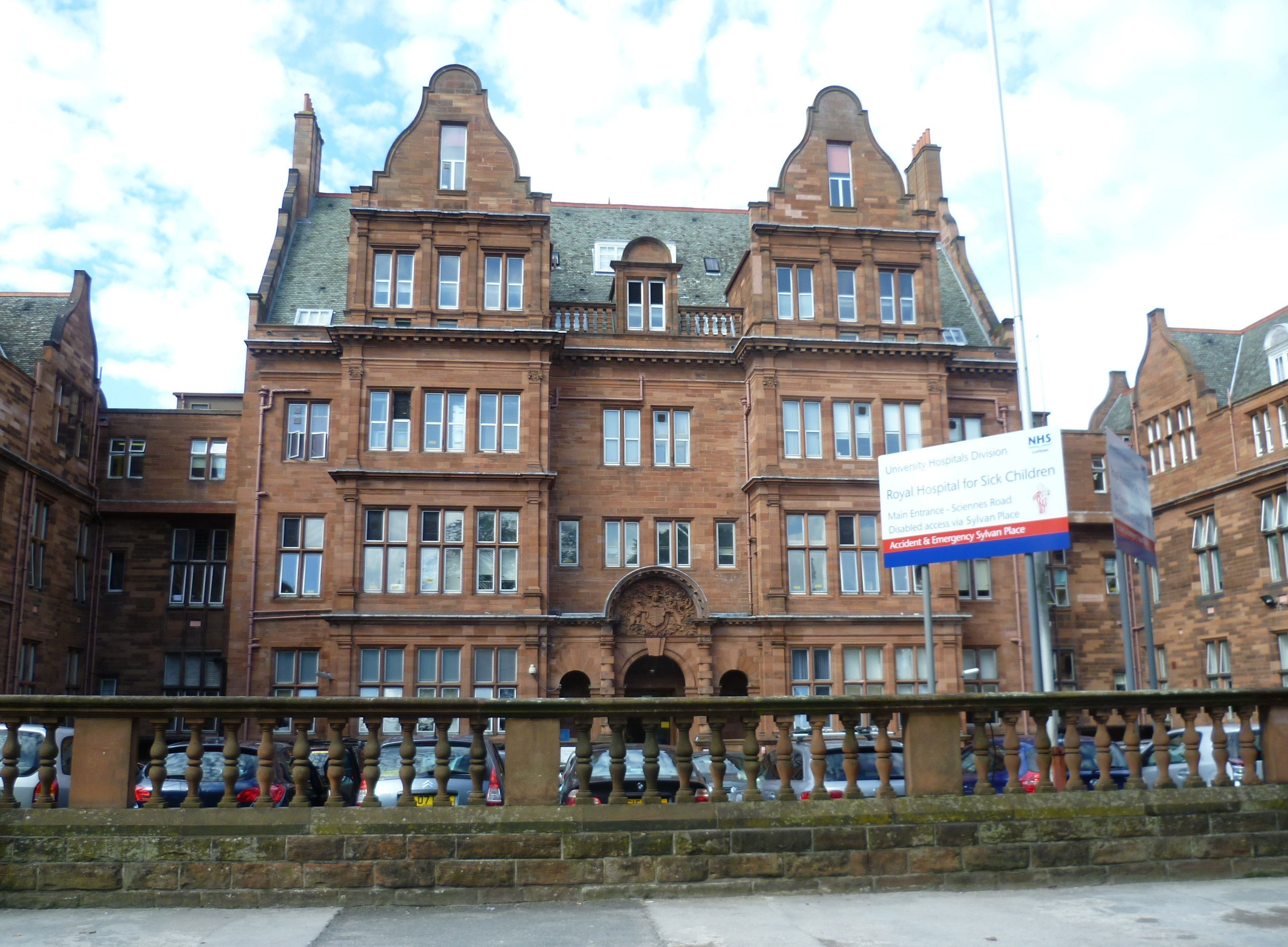
Former Royal Hospital For Sick Children

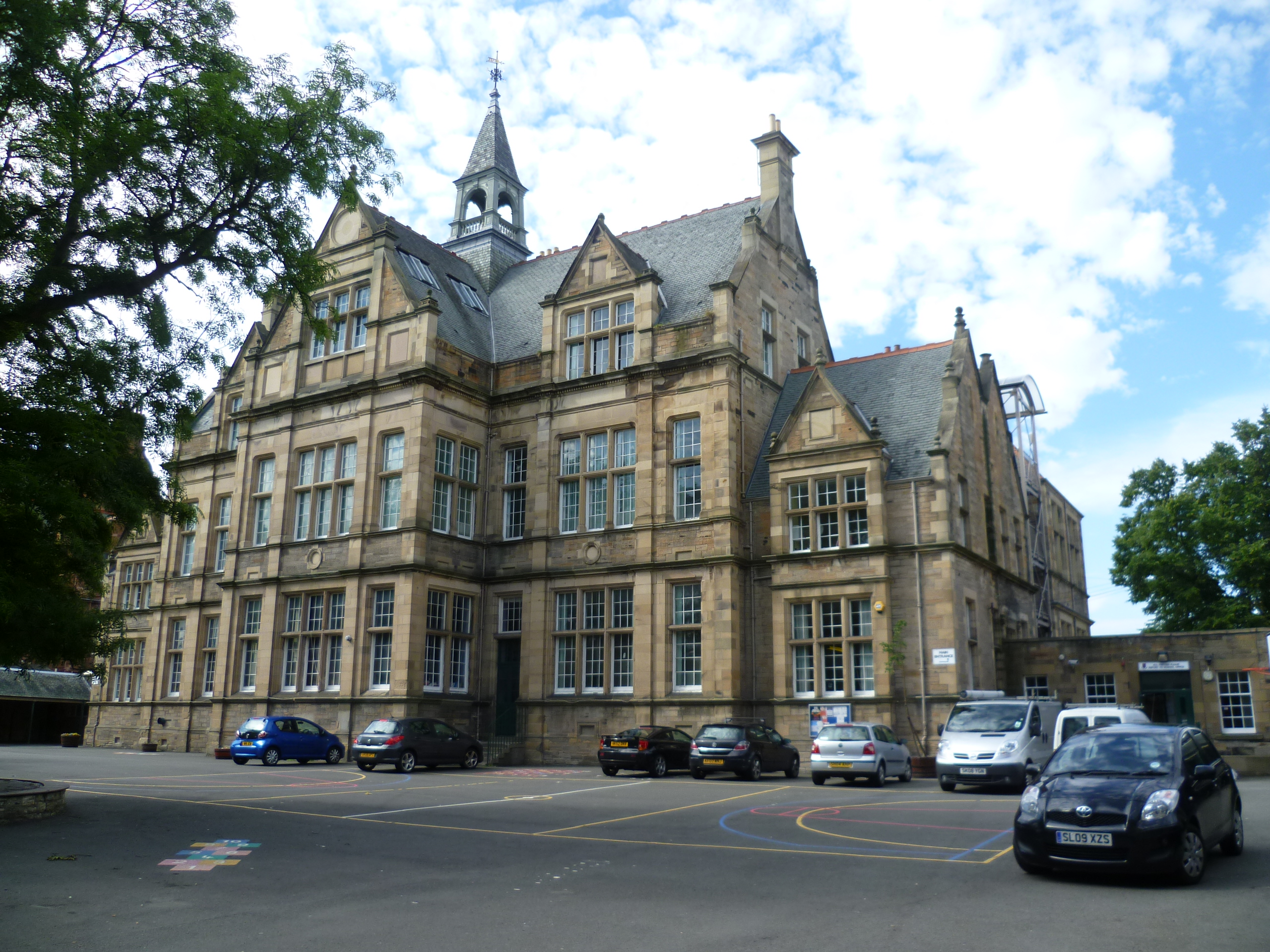
Sciennes Primary School

Built around 1741, Sciennes Hill House was originally a substantial three-story town house set in a large garden. It was partly demolished in 1868, the remaining parts of the structure being incorporated into a terrace of Victorian tenements which now make up the north side of Sciennes House Place. The north elevation was the original front of the house. This still contains some of the original architectural features but these are not visible from the street. The street frontage was originally the back of the house. The interior of the building was sympathetically restored in 1988. In the winter of 1786–87, the house was the location of the only recorded meeting of Robert Burns and Walter Scott, at a literary dinner hosted by the philosopher Professor Adam Ferguson. A bronze plaque on the outside of the building commemorates the event.

Sciennes House Place is also the location of the Old Jewish Burial Ground, the first Jewish cemetery in Scotland. It was opened in 1816 by the Edinburgh Hebrew Congregation and closed to burials in 1870. Some of the memorials, inscribed in Hebrew, show up to four generations of some families buried here.

Also in Sciennes House Place is the Old Braid Fire Station, a Category C listed building which was designed in 1885 by Robert Morham, the City Architect. This was one of four fire stations established in the 1820s by Edinburgh's first firemaster James Braidwood. It is now an architect's office.

Robert Morham also designed, in 1884, the former 'A' Division Police Station on the corner of Causewayside. This is a four-storey building in the Scottish Baronial style. It closed in the early 1980s and has since been converted to flats. The building stands opposite the shop of the antique dealer and police historian T W Archibald who wrote a history of the Lothians and Borders Police.

The former Royal Hospital for Sick Children (commonly referred to as the Sick Kids) is an imposing neo-Jacobean building, designed by George Washington Browne. It operated at its site in Sciennes Road from 1895 to 2021. It is a listed building with murals by Phoebe Anna Traquair in its mortuary chapel. In 2017, the hospital was due to move to Little France, but this was delayed because of technical and financial problems. In February 2019, planning permission was given to the Downing Group to convert the main hospital building to 126 residential units and to replace other buildings on the site with student flats. The hospital finally closed on 23 March 2021 when its facilities moved to the new Royal Hospital for Children and Young People at Little France. The Downing Group started work on the redevelopment of the site in June 2021.

Sciennes Primary School stands next to the former hospital. It was designed in 1889 by Robert Wilson, the architect for the Edinburgh Board of Education, and opened in 1892.

Sylvan House is an 18th-century Category B listed residential building situated behind a row of Victorian tenements in Sylvan Place. In the 1790s, it was the summer home of Joseph Black, Professor of Chemistry at Edinburgh University. A plaque commemorating Black's occupancy was unveiled in 1991.

== Notable residents ==
- William Bertram (1798–1860), co-founder (with his brother, George) of Bertrams Ltd., lived at 14 East Sciennes Street.
- Duncan Napier (1831–1921), botanist and herbalist, lived at 8 Gladstone Terrace and later at 5 Sciennes Gardens (at the time, the house was known as Ruby Villa).
- Arthur Conan Doyle (1859–1930), novelist and short-story writer, noted for his Sherlock Holmes stories, lived briefly with his family in an overcrowded tenement at 3 Sciennes Place when he was eight years old.
- David Daiches (1912–2005), literary historian and critic, and his brother Lionel Daiches (1911 – 1999), Scottish QC and Liberal Party politician, grew up at 6 Millerfield Place.
- Charles J. Smith (1920–2000), author of several books on the history of Edinburgh, lived briefly in Livingstone Place as a child.
- Sheila Gilmour (1949–) Scottish Labour MP for Edinburgh East from 2010 to 2015.
