= Little France =

Area of Edinburgh, Scotland

Coordinates: 55°55′12″N 3°08′21″W

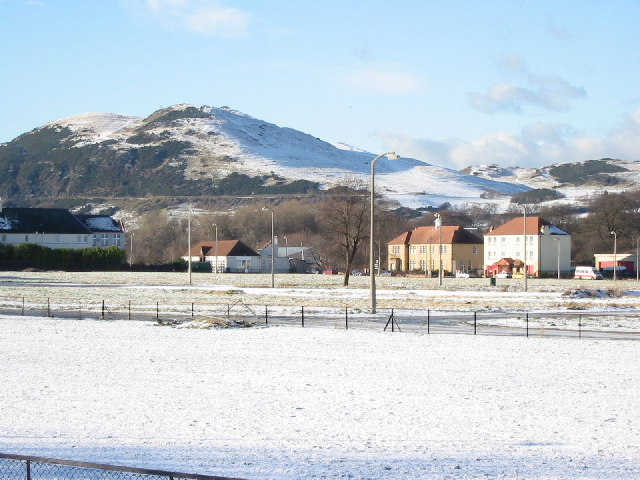
Wauchope Square in Little France

Little France is a suburb of Edinburgh, the capital of Scotland. It is on the A7, approximately 4 miles (6.4 km) south of the city centre.

The area falls within the parish of Liberton in the south-east of the city. It acquired its name from members of the entourage brought to Scotland from France by Mary, Queen of Scots, who took up residence at nearby Craigmillar Castle. The French left the city following the siege of Leith, under the terms of the Treaty of Edinburgh.

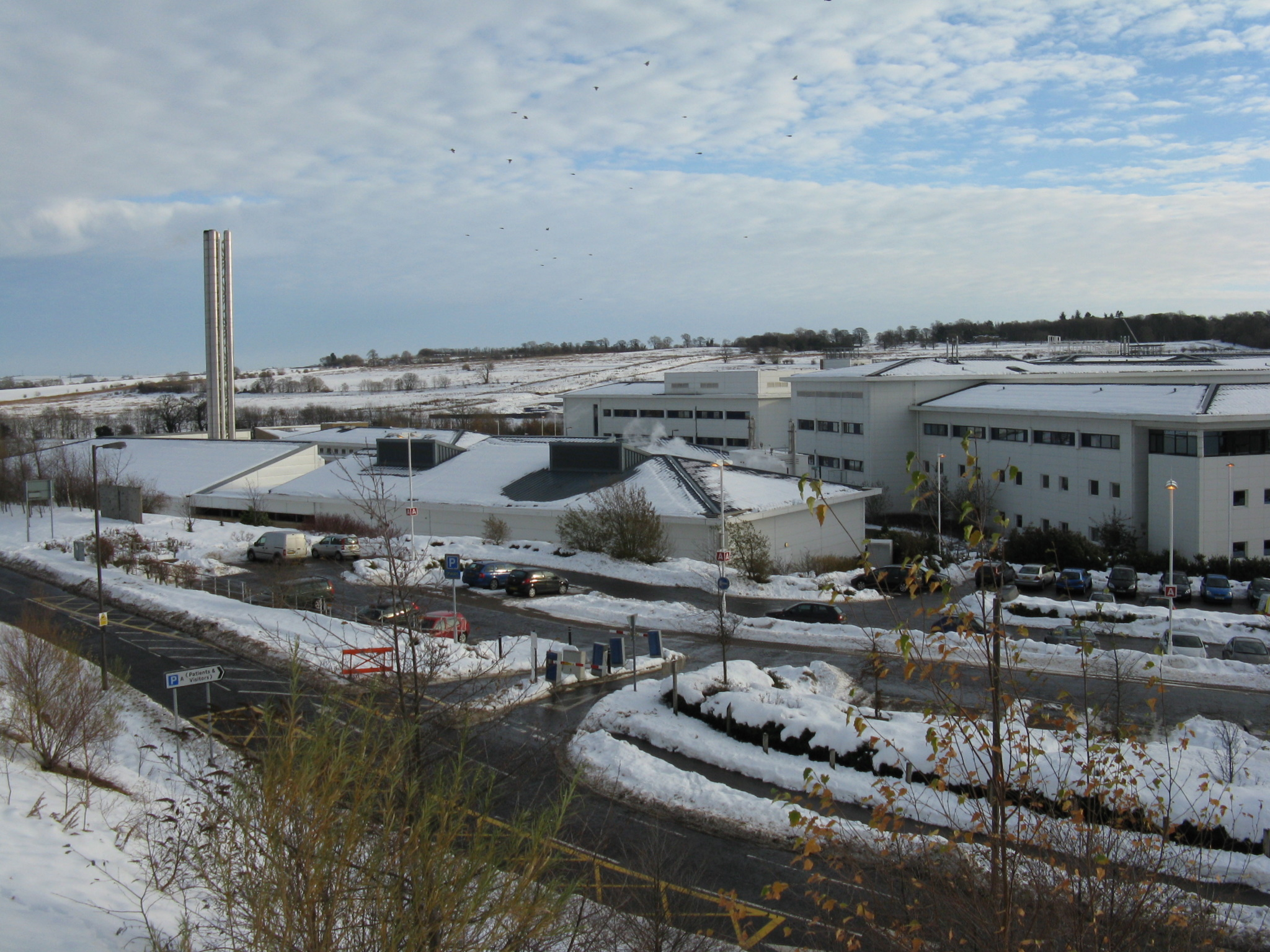
Edinburgh Royal Infirmary at Little France

Little France is the location of the Royal Infirmary of Edinburgh. The phased move of patients was begun in 2002 and completed in 2003.

Little France is also adjacent to Craigour, which is just to its south.

== See also ==
- BioQuarter
