= Mary Brancker =

British veterinarian

Mary Brancker CBE DUniv FRCVS
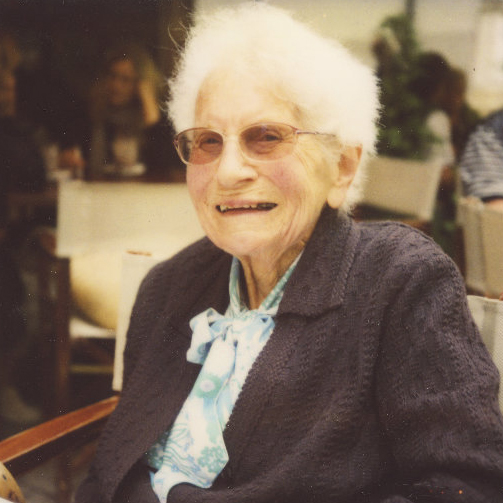
- Mary Brancker in Budapest, June 2009
- Born: Winifred Mary Brancker; 14 August 1914; London, England
- Died: 18 July 2010 (aged 95); Sutton Coldfield, England
- Education: Royal Veterinary College, London

Winifred Mary Brancker (1914–2010) was an English veterinary surgeon, best known as the first woman to become president of the British Veterinary Association since its foundation in 1881.

== Early life and education ==
Mary Brancker was born in Hampstead, London in 1914, the youngest of three children of corn merchant Henry Brancker and his wife Winifred Caroline Eaton. Her brother, Flying Officer (Henry) Paul Brancker DFC and Bar, was killed in action when he was shot down over the Netherlands in 1942. Their cousin was Air Vice-Marshal Sir Sefton Brancker, KCB, AFC.

Brancker was educated privately and at Belstead School, Suffolk. She then attended the Royal Veterinary College in London from 1932 to 1937.

== Career ==
After graduating from the Royal Veterinary College in 1937 (having been one of the first women to attend), Brancker took on the position of assistant in a Lichfield veterinary practice run by Harry Steele-Bodger. When World War II broke out and bomb damage forced the evacuation of the British Veterinary Association (BVA) from its London headquarters, the BVA was run from then-president Steele-Bodger's practice. During this time, Brancker found herself becoming increasingly involved in the dealings of the BVA. Following Steele-Bodger's untimely death in 1952, Brancker took his place on the BVA council.

Harry Steele-Bodger's veterinary practice was based in Lichfield, Tamworth, and Sutton Coldfield. After his death, his sons Alasdair and Micky, both veterinary surgeons like their father, took over the Lichfield and Tamworth surgeries respectively, and Brancker began practising in her own right in Sutton Coldfield.

In 1967, Mary Brancker became the first (and until 2005, the only) woman to be elected President of the British Veterinary Association and was responsible for directing the practising arm of the veterinary profession during the foot-and-mouth outbreak of 1967/68, for which she was appointed Officer of the Order of the British Empire (OBE) in 1969.

In 1972, Brancker published a book detailing her career and experiences, entitled All Creatures Great and Small: Veterinary Surgery as a Career (My Life & My Work). Coincidentally, the book was published on the same day as the James Herriot book of the same name.

After retiring from full-time practice in the 1980s, Brancker continued to pursue her interest in exotic animals – particularly primates – and helped to found the British Veterinary Zoological Society. Spiders and beetles were an area of particular personal interest, which led to the establishment of the Veterinary Invertebrate Society.

In 1990, Brancker participated in the winding-up of the Society of Women Veterinarians, which she had helped to found in 1941. This was due to the fact that the organisation, formed to promote women vets' interests, was no longer necessary. By this time the British veterinary profession was already well on its way to replacing the dominance of men with the numerical superiority of women.

== Twycross Zoo ==
One local pet shop in Sutton Coldfield whose animals Mary Brancker cared for, run by Molly Badham MBE and Nathalie Evans, later expanded and moved to become Twycross Zoo. Brancker was appointed zoo vet and added the treatment of exotic species, particularly primates and elephants, to her repertoire. She continued as the vet at Twycross until the 1980s, when she became a zoo volunteer.

In July 2007, Twycross Zoo dedicated a new exhibit to Brancker in recognition of her lifetime commitment to both Twycross and animal welfare. The Mary Brancker Waterways and Bornean Longhouse features a walk-through exhibit with waterfowl and Bornean birds and turtles, and educational material which explains how people live in traditional longhouses in Borneo. An enclosure for Scottish wildcats is also included. The official opening of the exhibit by Brian Blessed and the Malaysian High Commissioner, His Excellency Datuk Abd Aziz Mohammed, took place on 24 July 2007. An evaluation in 2008 showed that the exhibit had been a 'hit' with visitors.

== Honours ==
In addition to her OBE, Brancker received many more awards during her long career. In 1977 she was elected Fellow of the Royal College of Veterinary Surgeons (FRCVS). In 1996 the University of Stirling, whose Department of Aquaculture she had been instrumental in setting up, awarded her the honorary degree of Doctor of the University (DUniv). In the 2000 New Year Honours she was appointed Commander of the Order of the British Empire (CBE) "for services to Animal Health and Welfare to Women in the Veterinary Profession". The British Veterinary Association (BVA) gave her its two highest awards: the Dalrymple–Champneys Cup in 1985 and the Chiron Award in 2005.

In September 2005, the Royal Veterinary College opened Mary Brancker House – a student hall of residence – in Kentish Town, London.

== Death ==
Mary Brancker died at Good Hope Hospital, Sutton Coldfield, of bronchopneumonia and heart disease on 18 July 2010 at the age of 95. Her funeral was held at All Saints' Church, Four Oaks on 30 July. That was followed by a memorial service at St Stephen's Church, Rochester Row, London on 3 December 2010.

Following her death in 2010, it was revealed that Brancker had left a share of her estate (estimated to be in the region of £40,000) to the Veterinary Benevolent Fund. Then-president of the VBF Lydia Brown described the gift as "typical of [Mary's] kindness and her appreciation of her career."

To celebrate the centenary of her birth, the independent conservation and wildlife society TZA (Twycross Zoo Association; stylised tza) formally rededicated the Mary Brancker Waterways at Twycross Zoo on 17 August 2014. Mary Brancker was a former president of TZA and played an active part in many of the society's activities right up until the end of her life.

== Publications ==
- All Creatures Great and Small: Veterinary Surgery as a Career (My Life & My Work), 27 October 1972, Educational Explorers. (ISBN 978-0852257432)
