= J. S. Steward =

English biologist and veterinary scientist (1906–1994)

J. S. Steward FRCVS DVSM
- Born: John Stanbury Steward; 28 December 1906; Hereford, England
- Died: 18 September 1994 (aged 87); Nottingham, England
- Occupations: Veterinary scientist; pathologist; surgeon
- Awards: Royal Agricultural Society Silver Medal; Royal Veterinary Medical Association Gold Medal; Centenary Prize

Academic background
- Education: Hereford Cathedral School
- Alma mater: Royal Veterinary College; University of Edinburgh; Liverpool School of Tropical Medicine; University of Cambridge

Academic work
- School or tradition: Veterinary medicine; Tropical medicine
- Institutions: Imperial Chemical Industries
- Main interests: Pathology; zoology; mammalogy; hippology; biochemistry; microbiology; parasitology; agriculture

John Stanbury Steward (28 December 1906 – 18 September 1994) was an English biologist and veterinary scientist specialising in mammalogy, chemical pathology and microbiology.

== Early life and education ==
Steward was born in Hereford, England, on 28 December 1906. He was the eldest son of Francis Victor Steward, a veterinary inspector and surgeon, and Elsie Mary Havill. His grandfather was John Alfred Steward JP, chairman of the Worcester Theatre Royal and director of the Worcester Gas Company who was twice Mayor of Worcester.

From 1921 to 1924, Steward attended Hereford Cathedral School, an independent boarding and day school. He attended the Royal Veterinary College from 1924 to 1928, winning the Royal Agricultural Society's silver medal for cattle pathology, the Royal Veterinary Medical Association's gold medal, and the Centenary Prize. He gained a diploma in veterinary medicine from the University of Edinburgh, which he attended from 1928 to 1929. In 1930, he enrolled at the Liverpool School of Tropical Medicine and gained a Ministry of Agriculture research scholarship in veterinary pathology from the University of Cambridge.

== Career ==
Steward was a member of the Colonial Services Club, Cambridge. He was elected a member of the Woolhope Naturalists' Field Club in 1954, and from 1964 to 1965 was president of the Central Veterinary Society.

While studying the infection of horses by strongyle worm in 1932, Steward found it existed in the diseased tendon tissues of the withers of farm colts.

In 1933, Steward was successful in establishing that the worm Onchocerca cervicalis Railliet and Henry is transmitted by Culicoides nubeculosus and probably by another species of Culicoides. This worm is the principal cause of fistulous withers and poll evil in horses.

A 1936 study of the life history of Brucella abortus by Steward revealed that adult forms of the parasite are common in the neck ligament, while embryos are found in the skin of this region. They develop in the midge's body in the course of about 24 to 25 days, and are then capable of infecting horses.

As a member of the Royal Society of Medicine, Steward believed that "the limitations and the great potentialities of veterinary inspection of dairy stock were scarcely appreciated." He proposed to the society in 1944 that, in the interest of public health, more should be done to educate the public by the Ministry of Health and to improve the safety of milk supply by the Ministry of Agriculture.

In 1945, Steward recorded malignant edema, a rapidly fatal wound infection likely due to Clostridium septicum, in swine for the first time in Great Britain.

In 1951, Steward announced the preliminary results of his application of Gammexane, an organochlorine chemical, to arthropods considered of veterinary importance. The results being promising, he concluded that "Among the synthetic insecticides Gammexane is outstanding in acaricidal activity, and this important veterinary use is being investigated further."

Regarding human interactions, Steward proposed the marsh rice rat as a model organism in 1951 to study certain infections to which other rodents used at the time are not susceptible. With Imperial Chemical Industries in 1952, he imported a dozen swamp rats from Florida to test the effectiveness of new drugs. These, he believed, would be more effective than the cotton rats often used "because they are considerably smaller".

In 1955, Steward wrote four articles on anthelmintic studies for the peer-reviewed scientific journal Parasitology, each focusing on a different approach to chemical testing.

After leaving Imperial Chemical Industries, Steward acquired a veterinary practice at 68 St James' Street, a Grade II* listed building in Nottingham, where he practised as Evershed, Smythe & Steward.

== Personal life ==
Steward resided at Gwynne House, Gwynne Street, Hereford and later Inkersall Manor, Bilsthorpe.

== Select publications ==
- Steward, J. S. (1 July 1947). "Host-parasite specificity in Coccidia; infection of the chicken with the turkey coccidium, Eimeria meleagridis". Parasitology. 38 (3): 157–159. doi:10.1017/S0031182000023106. PMID 20255200.
- Steward, J. S. (1 January 1948). "The reduced anthelmintic effect of tetrachlorethylene in oily solutions". Acta Pharmacologica et Toxicologica. 4 (2): 127–129. doi:10.1111/J.1600-0773.1948.TB03334.X. PMID 18880113.
- Steward, J. S. (1 December 1950). "Notes on some parasites of camels (Camelus dromedarius) in the Sudan". Veterinary Record. 62 (52): 836–837. doi:10.1136/VR.62.52.836 (inactive 18 July 2025). PMID 14798797. S2CID 41813557.
- Steward, J. S. (1 December 1950). "Trichostrongylosis and haemonchosis in the camel: their recognition and response to phenothiazine". Veterinary Record. 62 (52): 837–839. doi:10.1136/VR.62.52.837 (inactive 18 July 2025). PMID 14798798. S2CID 45727964.
- Steward, J. S. (1 January 1952). "The ineffectiveness of mepacrine in the treatment of coccidiosis of chickens, mice and sheep". Journal of Comparative Pathology. 62 (1): 69–79. doi:10.1016/S0368-1742(52)80006-2. PMID 14907924.
- Steward, J. S. (1 November 1955). "Anthelmintic studies. I. A controlled critical entero-nemacidal test". Parasitology. 45 (3–4): 231–241. doi:10.1017/S0031182000027608. PMID 13280264. S2CID 25173175.
- Steward, J. S. (1 November 1955). "Anthelmintic studies. II. A double entero-nemacidal anthelmintic test covering a wide range of activities". Parasitology. 45 (3–4): 242–254. doi:10.1017/S003118200002761X. PMID 13280265. S2CID 2844275.
- Steward, J. S. (1 November 1955). "Anthelmintic studies. III. A taeniacidal testing technique". Parasitology. 45 (3–4): 255–265. doi:10.1017/S0031182000027621. PMID 13280266. S2CID 7688819.
- Steward, J. S. (1 November 1955). "Anthelmintic studies. IV. The loss of efficiency by division of the dose". Parasitology. 45 (3–4): 266–268. doi:10.1017/S0031182000027633. PMID 13280267. S2CID 11081381.
