= Walter George Burnett Dickinson =

British veterinary surgeon (1858–1914)

Major Walter George Burnett Dickinson FRSE FRCVS TD (22 April 1858 – 6 August 1914) was a British veterinary surgeon, and (officially rather than correctly) one of the first "victims" of the First World War. He did not die in battle, but of a heart attack in Lincolnshire, but nevertheless officially became the first Major and second officer to die during the war.

== Life ==
He was born in Boston, Lincolnshire on 22 April 1858.

Dickinson went to Boston Grammar School, the Alfort Ecôle de Veterinaire in Paris and the New Veterinary College in Edinburgh run by Prof William Williams. He took over his father’s veterinary practice in Boston in 1881, marrying two years later.

He was admitted a Fellow of the Royal College of Veterinary Surgeons and later served as President of the Lincolnshire Veterinary Medical Society. In 1904 he was elected a Fellow of the Royal Society of Edinburgh. His proposers were D’Arcy Wentworth Thompson, William Owen Williams (son of Prof William Williams, Dr John MacMillan, and Dr James Hunter.

He joined the Lincolnshire Garrison Artillery Volunteers in February 1902, as veterinary officer, and was promoted to the rank of captain in 1905, and then major in 1913. He belonged to the Territorial Force, the 1st Battery, 1st North Midland Brigade, Royal Field Artillery. When the threat of war increased in July 1914, the government took the precaution of buying horses from farmers across the country to meet the requirements of possible mobilisation. Dickinson’s combination of military position and veterinary knowledge made him the first choice to oversee this duty in the Boston area.

On 6 August, two days after war was declared, and 36 hours into the conflict, he was visiting a Butterwick farm and, having negotiated the sale of some horses, he returned to his car and collapsed dead. He had a history of heart disease, and was killed by arterosclerosis. He was 56. The Commonwealth War Graves Commission’s definition qualifies this, and all other military deaths regardless of cause, as a ‘war death’, entitling Dickinson to an official war grave. He was buried in Boston Cemetery beneath a standard Commonwealth War Graves Commission headstone, listing him as a major in the Royal Field Artillery.
