= Cotchin =

Cotchin is a surname. Notable people with the surname include:

- Ernest Cotchin (1917–1988), British veterinary pathologist
- Trent Cotchin (born 1990), Australian rules footballer
