= Saul Tzipori =

American microbiologist

Saul Tzipori is an American microbiologist, currently the Agnes Varis University Chair and Distinguished Professor at Tufts University. He is a Fellow of the Royal College of Veterinary Surgeons.
