= Andrew J. Higgins =

Andrew J. Higgins may refer to:

- Andrew Jackson Higgins or Andrew Higgins (1886–1952), American shipbuilder
- Andrew Jackson Higgins (judge) (born 1921), American judge
- USNS Andrew J. Higgins, United States Navy replenishment oiler
- Andrew Higgins (veterinarian), British veterinarian and scientist
