= Mary Dick =

- Born: June 1, 1791; Whitehorse Close, Canongate
- Died: July 14, 1883 (aged 92); Burntisland, Fife
- Resting place: New Calton Burial Ground

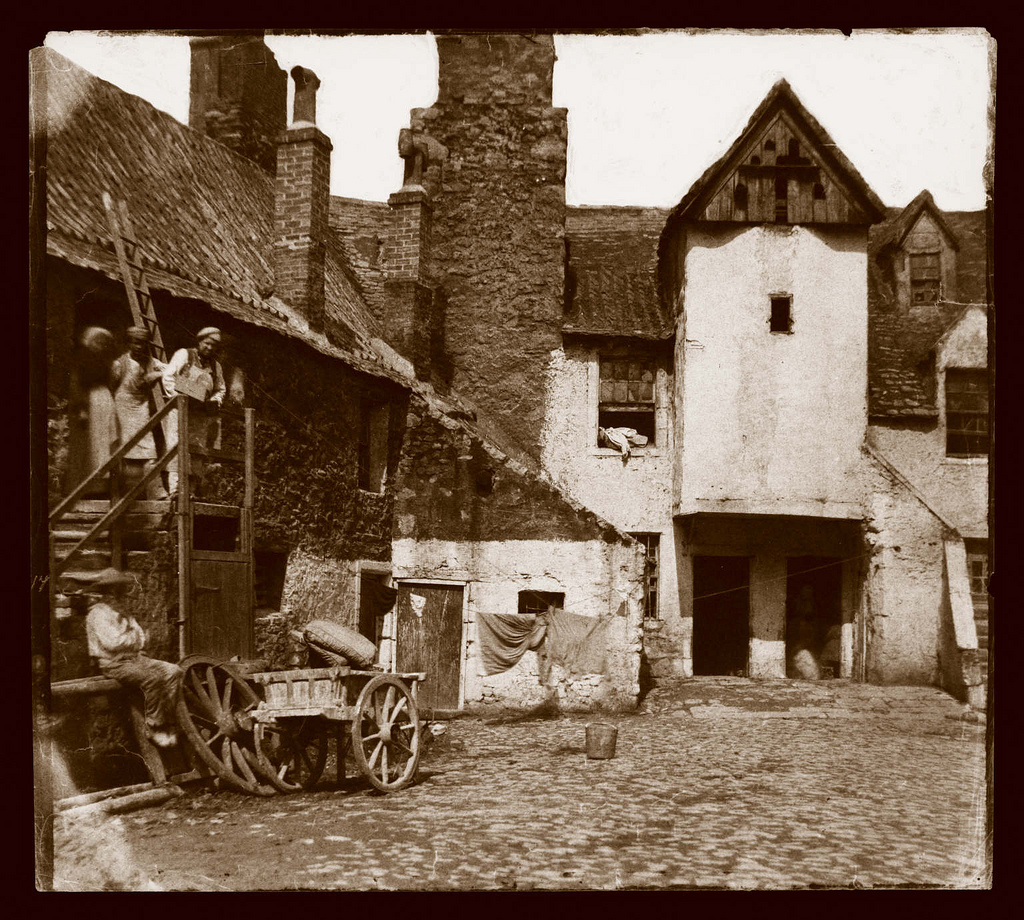
Whitehorse Close, Canongate

Mary Dick (1 June 1791- 14 July 1883) was the sister of William Dick, founder of the Veterinary College in Edinburgh.

== Early life ==
Mary Dick was born in Whitehorse Close, Canongate (Edinburgh). She was the oldest child of John Dick and Jean Anderson. John, a farrier had a forge in Whitehorse Close and his family also lived there. The family moved to Clyde Street in the New Town in 1815 where the Veterinary College was established.

== Role ==
Mary was a key figure in supporting her brother William in establishing his Veterinary College. Neither Mary nor William had children - the College was their creation. She kept strict guard over the College accounts, thus preventing any financial problems. Mary Dick, austere and Calvinistic, was also general censor of the manners and morals of the students. Former students were her constant and regular correspondents, and she was held in sincere respect and affectionate regard by all.

== Later life and death ==
On the death of her brother in 1866, Mary moved to Burntisland, Fife, where they had acquired property. For some years, she expected the Principal and sometimes the stableman to visit to keep her informed of College affairs. On 1 December 1873, she wrote to the Trustees suggesting that the Clyde Street school should in future be known as "The Dick Veterinary College".

Mary Dick died at Burntisland at the age of ninety-two and was buried in the family grave in the New Calton Burial Ground, Edinburgh.

== Her legacy ==
Mary endowed approximately £11,500 for "The Mary Dick Chair of Physiology" and £13,000 for "The Barclay and Goodsir Chair of Comparative Anatomy" at the University of Edinburgh.
