= James Beart Simonds =

English veterinary surgeon

- Born: 18 February 1810; Lowestoft, Suffolk, England
- Died: 5 July 1904 (aged 94)
- Occupation: Veterinary surgeon

James Beart Simonds (18 February 1810 – 5 July 1904) was an English veterinary surgeon.

== Biography ==
Simonds was born at Lowestoft, Suffolk, on 18 February 1810, was son of James Simonds (d. October 1810) by his wife, a daughter of Robert Beart of Rickenhall, Suffolk, an agriculturist and horse-breeder. The father was grandson of James Simonds (born in 1717), who early left the original family home at Redenhall, Norfolk, for Halesworth, Suffolk. Of his five sons born there, Samuel (born in 1754), the fourth, who resided at Bungay in Suffolk, had four sons, the eldest (Samuel) and youngest (John) entering the veterinary profession; the second son, James, was father of the subject of this article.

James Beart, brought up by his grandparents at Bungay, was educated at the Bungay grammar school, and entered the Veterinary College in London as a student on 7 January 1828. He received his diploma to practise in March 1829, and succeeded to his uncle Samuel's business as a veterinary surgeon at Bimgay. In 1836 he migrated to Twickenham, and shortly after took a share in organising the scientific work connected with the animals of the farm of the then newly established English Agricultural Society, of which he became an ordinary member on 25 July 1838 (honorary member, 3 April 1849; foundation life governor, 5 March 1890). In 1842 he was appointed to a new professorship of cattle pathology at the Veterinary College in Camden Town, and was made consulting veterinary surgeon to the Royal Agricultural Society (a position he held for sixty-two years until his death). Settling in London, and disposing of his practice at Twickenham, he was active in the movement for obtaining the charter which was granted on 8 March 1844 to the Royal College of Veterinary Surgeons, of which in due course (1862–3), he became president. He took a prominent part in the efforts of the Royal Agricultural Society to popularise information amongst farmers as to the diseases of animals, and he investigated their causes and means of prevention. In 1857, he carried out an inquiry on the Continent into the cattle plague, which was then committing great ravages, and made a report of eighty-three pages. His information proved useful on a sudden outbreak of the same disease in London in June 1865. The privy council office, owing to doubt of its legal powers, delayed the issue of an order for the slaughtering and burial in quicklime of all diseased animals, until the infection had spread over a great part of England. A veterinary department was improvised at the privy council office to deal with the matter. Simonds was appointed chief inspector and professional adviser, and amongst his helpers was Professor (afterwards Sir) George Thomas Brown. After the stamping out of the outbreak of cattle plague, which was estimated to have cost five millions sterling in money loss alone, it was decided to continue the veterinary department as a permanent branch of the council office, and Simonds remained at its head until November 1871, when he resigned in order to become principal of the Royal Veterinary College in succession to Professor Charles Spooner. Owing to failing health, he retired in June 1881 on a pension, removing to the Isle of Wight. He remained senior consulting veterinary surgeon to the Royal Agricultural Society until his death, at the age of ninety-four years, on 5 July 1904.

He was twice married, his first wife being his cousin, Martha Beart (d. 22 Aug. 1851), by whom he was father of James Sexton Simonds. for some time chief of the metropolitan fire brigade, and of two daughters. His second wife survived him.
