= Allen Dalzell =

Scottish chemist and pharmacologist

Allen Dalzell MD FRSE (1821–1869) was a Scottish chemist and pharmacologist who was professor of chemistry and materia medica at the Dick Veterinary College in Edinburgh.

== Life ==
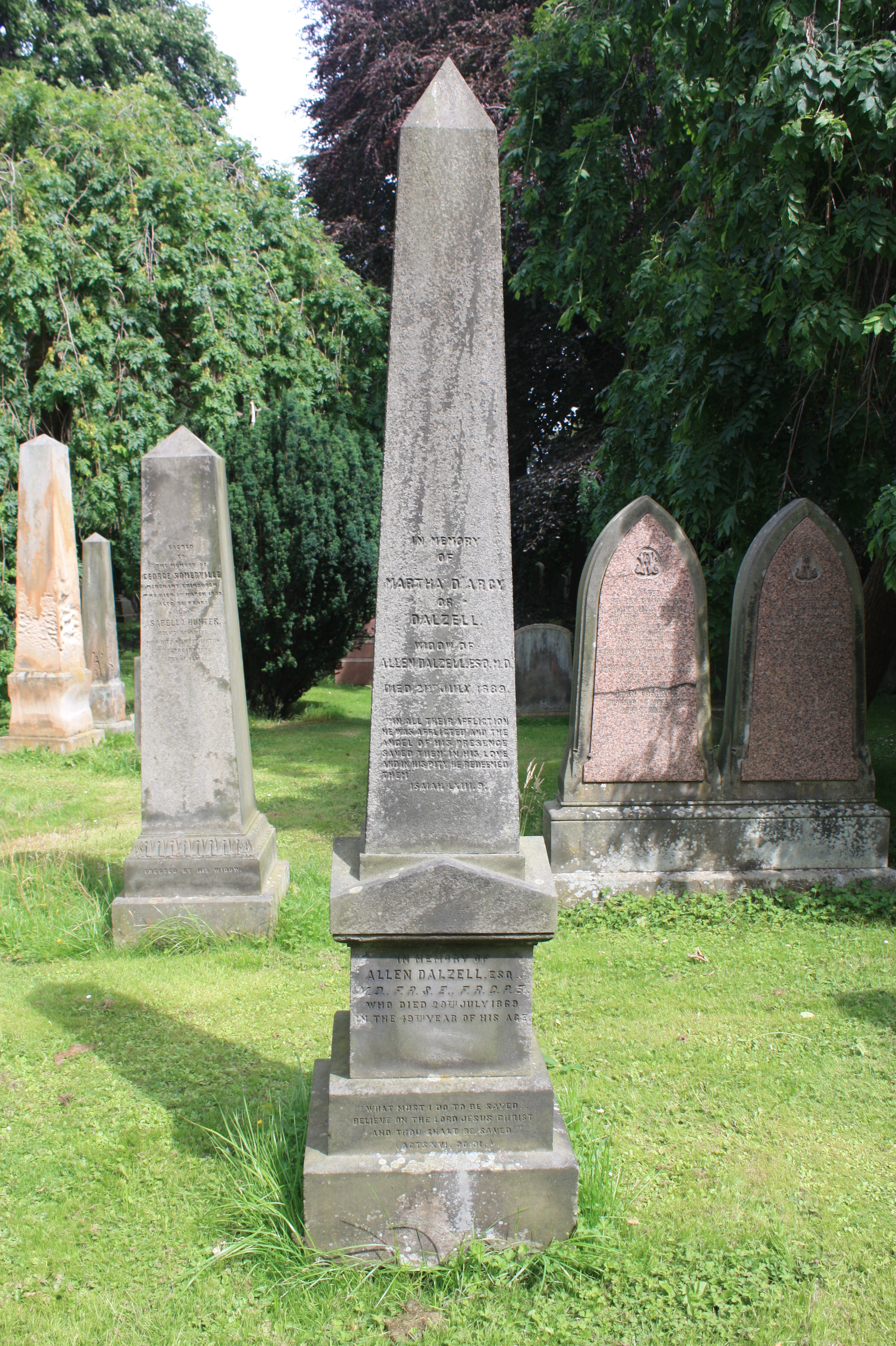
The grave of Allen Dalzell, Dean Cemetery, Edinburgh

He was born in Madras in India in 1821 to a father in the Indian Army. He trained as a doctor and followed in his father in serving in the army until 1846.

He came to Edinburgh prior to 1852, where his family roots were. In that year he was elected a Fellow of the Royal Society of Edinburgh, which was an impressive task as a "newcomer" to the city. His proposer was James Dalmahoy. In 1853 the University of Edinburgh granted him a doctorate (MD) but it is unclear if this is where his original medical training took place. From 1853 he began taking on educational roles at firstly the University of Edinburgh then in 1855 added lecturing at the newly founded Dick Vet School, then in the New Town alongside its founder, William Dick.

In 1858 he was elected a member of the Harveian Society of Edinburgh. In 1860 he is listed as resigning from the Edinburgh Rifle Volunteer Corps where he served alongside Robert Christison who acted as their Captain.

He lived in rooms at the college on Clyde Street.

In January 1869 he and William Williams were sued by former colleague John Adam McBride, leading to a great feeling of ill-will in the college. Whilst sued for £5000 the court, whilst finding slander to be proven, agreed a sum of £500. This action, to which Dalzell was only very tangentially connected, appeared to take a toll upon his health, especially as the judges opened the possibility for a retrial.

He died on 29 July 1869 and is buried beneath a small obelisk in Dean Cemetery on the west side of the city. The grave lies to the west side of the original cemetery in a section facing the pyramid on "Lords Row".

== Family ==
He was married to Martha D'Arcy (d.1889).

== Trivia ==
Records indicate that he purchased his laboratory equipment from James Dewar.

== Publications ==
- Chemistry and Physiology in their Religious Bearings (1858)
