= Joseph Henry Carter =

British veterinarian

- Born: 5 May 1857; Bradford, United Kingdom
- Died: 15 May 1930 (aged 73)
- Occupation: Veterinarian

Joseph Henry Carter FRSE FRCVS (1857–1930) was a British veterinarian, serving as President of the Royal College of Veterinary Surgeons in 1913/14 and 1920.

== Life ==
He was born on 5 May 1857, in Bradford, Yorkshire to Joseph Shepherd Carter (died 1905), a farmer's son who trained as a vet at the main London Veterinary School. He was the second of three sons, all of whom became vets. He trained both in London and in Edinburgh (at the Royal Dick Veterinary College).

From 1901 to 1913 he was a member of Burnley Town Council, where his veterinary practice was based. On this Town Council he served as Chairman of the Highways and Sewage Committee. During both the Second Boer War and First World War he served as a Veterinary Transport Officer in South Africa.

He was elected a Fellow of the Royal Society of Edinburgh in 1905.

In 1920 he took over his father's practice in Burnley, Lancashire.

He died on 15 May 1930.

== Family ==
In 1888 he married Amy Veevers, only daughter of John Sharples Veevers J.P. They had at least one son, George Veevers Carter.
