= Andrew Higgins (veterinarian) =

British veterinarian and scientist

Andrew James Higgins: FRSB; FRCVS
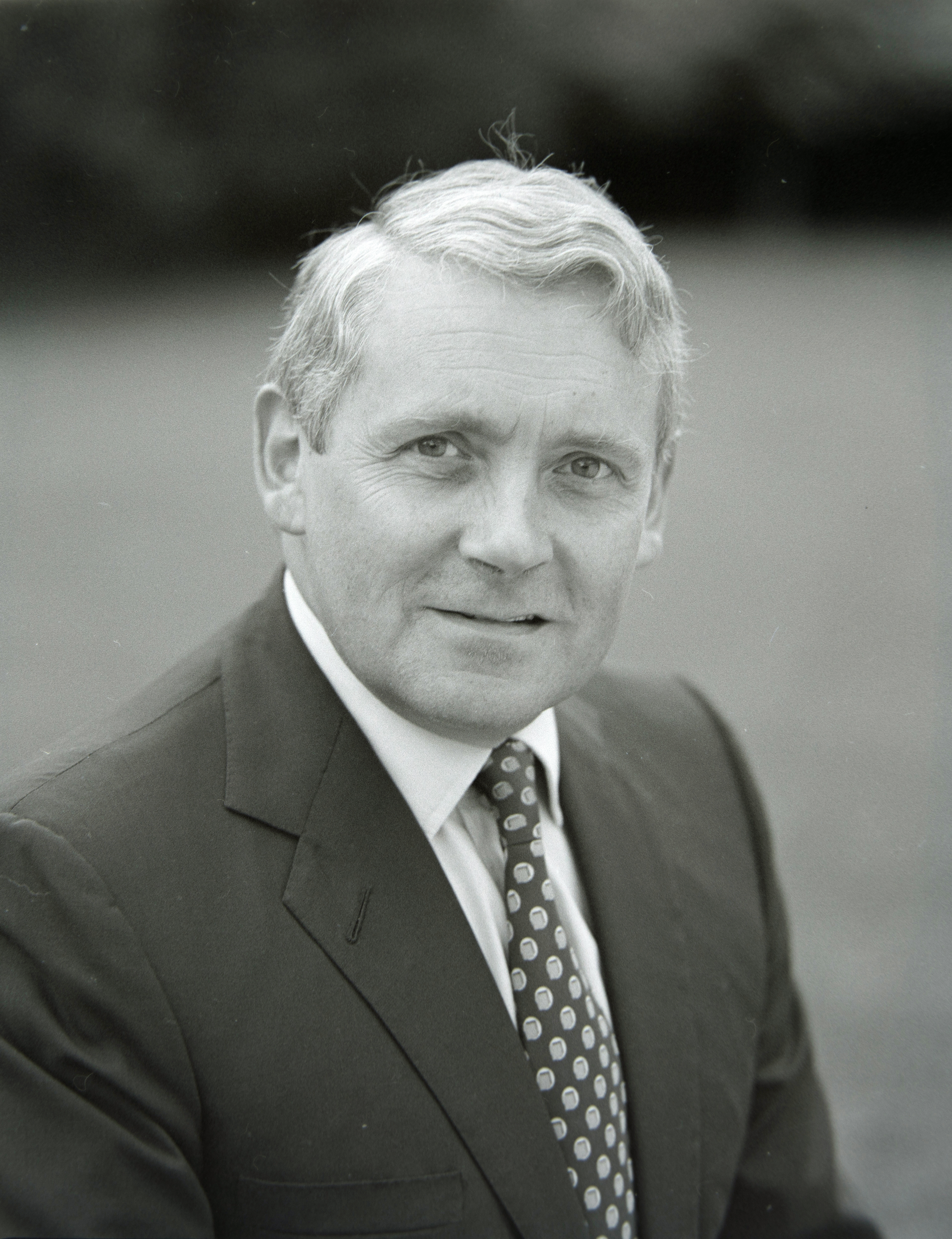
- Citizenship: British
- Occupation: Editor-in-chief
- Era: 1991-2016
- Organization: The Veterinary Journal
- Honours: Fellow of the Royal College of Veterinary Surgeons

Andrew Higgins is a British veterinarian and scientist.

== Career ==
He graduated from the Royal Veterinary College in 1973 and was commissioned in the Royal Army Veterinary Corps where he served in Northern Ireland with the British Army Training Team in the Dhofar Rebellion in Oman. He wrote an account of his experiences titled With the SAS and Other Animals (2011).

His military service in Oman led to his appointment as Veterinary Officer for HM Sultan Qaboos bin Said.

He then took an MSc in Tropical Animal Health and Production at the Centre for Tropical Veterinary Medicine in the Royal (Dick) School of Veterinary Studies, which led to his appointment as Technical Advisor in the Middle East and North Africa, for The Wellcome Foundation.

He published several papers on camel diseases and edited The Camel in Health and Disease 1985.

He was editor-in-chief of The Veterinary Journal from 1991 to 2015. He was also the scientific director and chief executive of the Animal Health Trust.

Following the closure of the institute in 2022, he raised funds to purchase the library and other historical records, which were relocated to the Harper Keele Veterinary School, and the institute's archives were transferred to the Royal College of Veterinary Surgeons.

The Andrew Higgins Prize, originally established as the Junior Scientist Prize in 1992, was renamed in 2016 to honour Higgins, the former editor-in-chief of The Veterinary Journal. It is awarded annually to the most commendable paper authored by a graduate within five years of obtaining their first degree. In 2009, Higgins chaired the Independent Anti-Doping and Medication Control Review for the Greyhound Board of Great Britain.

In 2015 Pen and Sword Books published Higgins' "With the SAS and Other Animals".

He is a fellow of Royal College of Veterinary Surgeons an honour bestowed upon him in 2020 for his contributions to the veterinary profession.

== Other selected works ==
- The Camel in Health and Disease 1986. A.J. Higgins. Baillière Tindall, London.
- The Equine Manual [1995; 2006] A.J. Higgins, J.R. Snyder. Elsevier, London.
