= Micky Steele-Bodger =

England international rugby union player (1925–2019)

- Born: Michael Roland Steele-Bodger; 4 September 1925 Tamworth, England
- Died: 9 May 2019 (aged 93)
- School: Rugby School
- University: Cambridge University & Edinburgh University
- Occupation: Veterinary Surgeon

Rugby union career
- Position: Flanker
Senior career
Years	Team	Apps	(Points)
- Harlequins
–	Barbarians		
International career
Years	Team	Apps	(Points)
1947–1948	England	9	(0)

Michael Roland Steele-Bodger CBE MRCVS (4 September 1925 – 9 May 2019) was an English veterinary surgeon and rugby union footballer who played flanker for Harlequins, England and Barbarians, and was President of the Barbarian Football Club and President of the East India Club, London.

== Early life and education ==
Steele-Bodger was born in Tamworth, the younger son of Harry Steele-Bodger. He was educated at Rugby School, at Gonville and Caius College, Cambridge and at the University of Edinburgh where he read Veterinary Studies. He became a veterinary surgeon like both his father and his elder brother Alasdair.

== Rugby Union ==
Steele-Bodger played for Cambridge in the Varsity Match in 1945 and 1946. He then represented the Edinburgh University rugby club for two full seasons. His brother Alasdair also played for Edinburgh University.

He gained 9 caps for England, playing in all 4 matches in the 1946–47 season and all 5 matches in the 1947–48 season. In his final international, against France in March 1948, Steele-Bodger had to move to scrum-half when Richard Madge left the field, despite suffering from concussion himself. An anterior cruciate ligament injury ended his playing career in 1949. Subsequently, he was a selector for England and The Lions, President of the Rugby Football Union in 1973–74, and Chairman of the International Rugby Board.

In 1948, he inaugurated the annual tradition of bringing a guest Steele-Bodger XV to play Cambridge University as a warm-up to the Varsity Match.

He was an active member of the Round Table being one of the founding members of his local Tamworth Round Table in 1952.

== Honours ==
Steele-Bodger was appointed Commander of the Order of the British Empire (CBE) in the 1990 New Year Honours "for services to Rugby Union Football."

== Death ==
Steele-Bodger died on 9 May 2019, aged 93.
