= Harry Steele-Bodger =

British veterinarian

Henry William Steele-Bodger MRCVS (1896 – 1952) was a British veterinary surgeon.

Educated at Cranleigh School, he served with the Royal Engineers and Royal Horse Artillery. He lost an eye in his war service. After the war he qualified as a vet at the Royal Veterinary College, in Edinburgh and set up practice in Tamworth, Staffordshire. He was active in leading vets and co-founded the Society of Veterinary Practitioners, together with Sir Thomas Dalling.

In 1940, he served as President of the British Veterinary Association

== Family ==
His sons Micky and Alasdair were also veterinarians.
