= R. N. Smith =

Richard Norman Smith FRCVS
- R. N. Smith, Macebearer, Veterinary School at the University of Bristol
- Born: 1926
- Died: 12 August 1988 (aged 61–62)
- Occupation: Veterinary Surgeon

Richard Norman Smith FRCVS (1926 – 12 August 1988), known as R. N. Smith, was President of the British Veterinary Association between 1975 and 1976. He was on the council of the Royal College of Veterinary Surgeons and served as chairman of the Education Committee at the same institution. He was an academic and practitioner at the newly formed Veterinary School at the University of Bristol from its inception in the 1950s, and therefore one of the first contributors to its future success.

Smith was a regular contributor to learned journals. He also enjoyed his role in ceremonial affairs at the University of Bristol as Bedell, Assistant Marshal, Deputy Macebearer and as Macebearer from 1982.

== Life ==
Richard Norman Smith was born in 1926 and educated at Bedford Modern School where he won the mile in a new school record and the Bedfordshire Youth mile, also in a then record time. After school, he went up to the Royal Veterinary College where he would later be a Demonstrator in Anatomy.

After the Royal Veterinary College, Smith joined the fledgling Veterinary School at the University of Bristol. He was on the council of the Royal College of Veterinary Surgeons, and served as chairman of the Education Committee at the same institution. He was an academic and practitioner at the newly formed Veterinary School at the University of Bristol from its inception in the 1950s, and therefore one of the first contributors to its future success. He served as visiting professor at Purdue University between 1964 and 1965, and also provided courses at Ontario Veterinary College, and at Tufts University in Boston.

Smith later became president of the Mid-West Association of the British Veterinary Association, treasurer of the British Veterinary Association and then its president between 1975 and 1976.

== Selected works ==
- An Anatomy of the Horse, by Richard Norman Smith. Published by Quartilles International, London, 1973
- Anatomy of the Dog, by Richard Norman Smith. Published by Quartilles International, London, 1972
- Fusion of ossification centres in the cat, by R. N. Smith. Published in The Journal of Small Animal Practice, 1969
- Radiography for the Veterinary Surgeon, by Richard Norman Smith. Published by Baltimore, Williams and Wilkins, 1960
- Fusion of the epiphyses of the limb bones of the sheep, by R. N. Smith. Published in The Veterinary Record, 1956
