= George Thomas Brown =

English surgeon

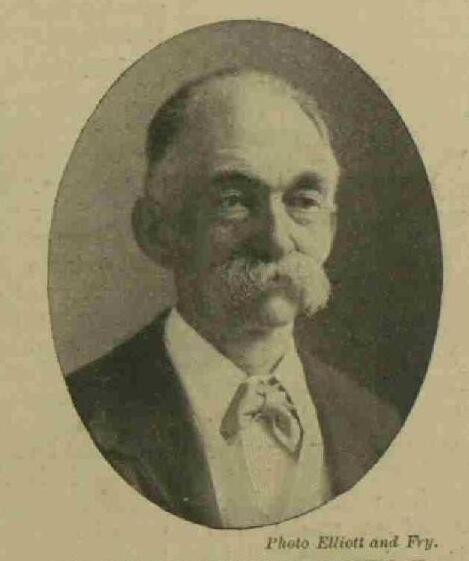
- Born: 30 December 1827; London
- Died: 20 June 1906; Stanmore
- Occupations: Veterinarian, medical doctor

George Thomas Brown (30 December 1827 – 24 June 1906) was an English veterinary surgeon.

== Biography ==
Brown was born in London on 30 December 1827. He was the elder son of Thomas Brown of Notting Hill Terrace, London, by his wife Grace Bryant. Colonel Sir William James Brown, K.C.B. (b. 1832), is his younger brother. George, after being educated privately, entered in 1846 the Royal Veterinary College. On 15 May 1847, he obtained his diploma and commenced veterinary practice in London. In 1850, when only twenty-three, he was appointed professor of veterinary science at the Royal Agricultural College at Cirencester, where he remained for thirteen years. A change in the administration of the college brought him back to London in 1863, though he continued to the end his association with the college as honorary professor. On the outbreak of cattle-plague in June 1865 he was appointed by the government to assist John Beart Simonds in stamping out the disease, and he remained associated with the veterinary department of the privy council until 1872, when he succeeded as chief veterinary officer. Under various titles he remained in charge of veterinary matters at the privy council office and (after 1889) at the board of agriculture until his retirement under the age clause at the end of 1893. He was made C.B. in 1887, at Queen Victoria's Jubilee, and was knighted at Osborne on 23 January 1898.

In addition to his official labours, Brown was from 1881 professor of cattle pathology at the Royal Veterinary College, and from 1888 to 1894 was principal. He was also an examiner of the Royal College of Veterinary Surgeons (the examining body), and became president in 1893. In December 1862 he joined the Royal Agricultural Society of England, of which he was elected an honorary member on 1 May 1878, and was consulting veterinary surgeon. Brown edited in 1862 'Harley and Brown's Histology,' and in 1885 published 'Animal Life in the Farm.' Otherwise his contributions to professional literature mainly consisted of reports to his department and of articles in the 'Journals' of the Royal and Bath and West of England agricultural societies, bodies which he greatly assisted with his sound and clearly expressed advice. His addresses to the students of the Royal Veterinary College were models of style. He was a fluent and forcible speaker, and a strong and fearless administrator. Successive presidents of his department bore testimony to his merits as an official at times of outbreak of animal disease.

After his resignation from the board of agriculture he lived in retirement at Stanmore, where he died on 24 June 1906, and was buried. He married in 1860 Margaret, daughter of James Smith of Stroud, by whom he had two sons and three daughters.
