= Judy MacArthur Clark =

British veterinarian

Judy MacArthur Clark CBE FRCVS
- Born: Judy MacArthur
- Occupation: veterinary surgeon

Judy MacArthur Clark is a British veterinary surgeon, and former President of the Royal College of Veterinary Surgeons. She has held government posts in the regulation of veterinary medicine.

== Career ==
Clark was chairwoman of the Farm Animal Welfare Council, now the Animal Welfare Committee, from 1999. She was appointed Chief Inspector of the Home Office unit for Animals in Science Regulations in 2007 and remained in that post until standing down in 2016. As part of that role, she led the Three Rs (animal research) programme.

Clark was president of the Royal College of Veterinary Surgeons from 1992 to 1993.

Clark is a policy advisor for the Royal Society of Tropical Medicine and Hygiene. She is Chair of the Trustees of the Soulsby Foundation.

She worked on the development of legislation for the Animals (Scientific Procedures) Act 1986.

Clark was the first president, in 2006, of the International Association of Colleges of Laboratory Animal Medicine.

Clark was employed as Vice-President of Worldwide Comparative Medicine for Pfizer, and runs her own company, JMC Welfare International. She has also worked for the Universities Federation for Animal Welfare.

== Honours ==
Clark was made a CBE in the 2004 Birthday Honours. She was made an honorary fellow of the British Pharmacological Society in 2016, "for her sustained leadership in the regulation of animal research". The University of Glasgow awarded her an honorary doctorate in 2001. She was made an honorary member of the American College of Laboratory Animal Medicine in 2007.

== Publications ==
- Soulsby, (Ernest Jackson) Lawson, Baron Soulsby of Swaffham Prior (1926–2017), veterinary scientist, article by Clark for the Dictionary of National Biography
- The 3Rs in research: a contemporary approach to replacement, reduction and refinement, British Journal of Nutrition, 2017
- Why Animals Matter: Animal Consciousness, Animal Welfare, and Human Well-Being, BioScience, 63(1): 57-59
- Adequate veterinary care for animals in research: a comparison of guidelines from around the world, with Joanne Zurlo and Kathryn Bayne, Institute for Laboratory Animal Research Journal, 2009
