= Olga Uvarov =

Russian surgeon and researcher (1910–2001)

Photograph taken in 1976

Dame Olga Nikolaevna Uvarov (9 July 1910 – 29 August 2001) was a veterinary surgeon and clinical researcher. She was the first woman president of the Royal College of Veterinary Surgeons. She was a distinguished member of the veterinary profession in every sense, spanning general practice and animal health research as well as veterinary politics and high-level contributions to enlightened legislation affecting animal welfare.

== Early life ==
Olga Nikolaevna Uvarov was born in Moscow on 9 July 1910. Her father, Nikola Uvarov, was a prosperous lawyer who could trace his ancestry to a Tartar count; although his father was a minor bank clerk. When the October Revolution began in 1917, Uvarov's father sent her, along with her three brothers and their mother, Elena, to his parents to Ouralsk. On the way there, Uvarov's mother died of typhoid fever. Uvarov's father was executed by a revolutionary tribunal in 1920. Orphaned, she and her brothers lived together with their grandfather, witnessing horrors they would never forget.

Uvarov's uncle, the entomologist Boris Uvarov (later Sir Boris Uvarov, KCMG FRS), who emigrated to London in 1920, helped his father, niece and nephews sending money, food and clothing. By 1922 with the assistance of the American Red Cross, Boris Uvarov tried to transport the children out of Soviet Russia, but he could afford only to pay the costs for one child. He selected Olga; she was escorted to Estonia and put on a ship for England. By the time she arrived in England in 1923, she was underweight, had lost her hair and fingernails, and had malaria.

== Career ==
Uvarov studied at the University of London Royal Veterinary College, where she won the college's bronze medals for Physiology and Histology and qualified in 1934. Following graduation, Uvarov worked first in general mixed practice as an assistant veterinary surgeon, before establishing her own practice in 1944 in Surrey.

In 1953, Uvarov joined the Veterinary Department of Glaxo Laboratories Ltd, where she was involved in product development and training sales representatives. While at Glaxo, Uvarov published her research on the development of antimicrobials, and their use in animals. From 1967 until her retirement in 1970, Uvarov was head of Glaxo's veterinary advisory department.

In her retirement, from 1970 to 1976, Uvarov headed the British Veterinary Association (BVA)'s technical information department, continuing until 1978 as the BVA's adviser on technical information.

Uvarov served as president of the Society of Women Veterinary Surgeons from 1947 to 1949. From 1951 to 1952, she was president of the Central Veterinary Society, and was awarded the Victory Gold Medal by that society in 1965. She was elected to the council of the Royal College of Veterinary Surgeons in 1968, and became a fellow in 1973. She took over as the first woman president of the RCVS in 1976. She was also Vice-President of the Institute of Animal Technicians.

== Legacy ==
In 2005, the Dame Olga Uvarov Research Award was established, based on a legacy which Uvarov had left to the Royal College of Veterinary Surgeons. The award, given annually to veterinary researchers, consists of a medal and a prize of £1000.

Uvarov's papers are held by the RCVS Knowledge archive.

== Death ==
Never married, Uvarov's last years were spent in a nursing home at Hatch End until her death at age 91 on 29 August 2001.

== Works ==
- Allcroft, Ruth; Clegg, F.G.; Uvarov, Olga (1959). "Prevention of swayback in lambs". Veterinary Record. 71 (884–889). ISSN 0042-4900.
- Uvarov, O. (1960). "Veterinary experience with griseofulvin". Transactions of the St. John's Hospital Dermatological Society. 45: 28–34. PMID 13779443.
- Uvarov, O. (1960). "The concentration of some antibiotics in the milk after intramammary infusion". Veterinary Record. 72: 1228–1231, 1232. ISSN 0042-4900.
- Uvarov, O. (18 March 1961). "Recent advances in the treatment of skin diseases with special reference to griseofulvin". Veterinary Record. 73: 258–62. PMID 13778978.
- Uvarov, Olga (June 1968). "Clinical evaluation of drugs in man and animals". Proceedings of the Royal Society of Medicine. 61 (6): 569–74. doi:10.1177/003591576806100616. PMC 1902561. PMID 4873871.
- Uvarov, O. (June 1969). "The development of antibiotics for the treatment of mastitis in cattle". Journal of the South African Veterinary Association. 40 (2): 137–152. hdl:10520/AJA00382809_4397. ISSN 1019-9128.
- Evans, J.M.; Uvarov, O.; Valliance, D.K. (23 August 1969). "Hormonal control of the oestrus cycle in the bitch". Veterinary Record. 85 (8): 233–4. doi:10.1136/vr.85.8.233. PMID 5391936. S2CID 12812057.
