= Royal College of Veterinary Surgeons Charitable Trust =

British charity

The Royal College of Veterinary Surgeons Charitable Trust is a British charity that assists veterinarians and veterinary nurses with grants and a specialist library.

Established in 1958, the Trust is associated with the Royal College of Veterinary Surgeons (RCVS). It is registered with the Charity Commission of England and Wales (number 230886). The Trust also maintains and curates the RCVS archives

== Activities ==
=== Grants ===
The Trust runs grant programmes for veterinarians, veterinary nurses, and veterinary researchers. From 2005–2010 the Trust invested over £2.7 million in vital veterinary research and education in the UK and in developing countries.

=== Library ===
The Trust runs a specialist library with print and electronic materials in all disciplines of veterinary medicine. The library includes 25,000 books, journals, conference proceedings and reports, including a large collection of annual veterinary publications from commonwealth countries. Located in London, the library is open to the public. It runs a membership scheme for people wishing to borrow items and access electronic resources off-site.

=== Historical collection and archive ===
The Trust runs a collection of historical RCVS publications, including 3,000 books and journals published before 1900. They cover all aspects of veterinary medicine and other works of general interest relating to animal health and country matters.
