= James Hallen =

British veterinarian

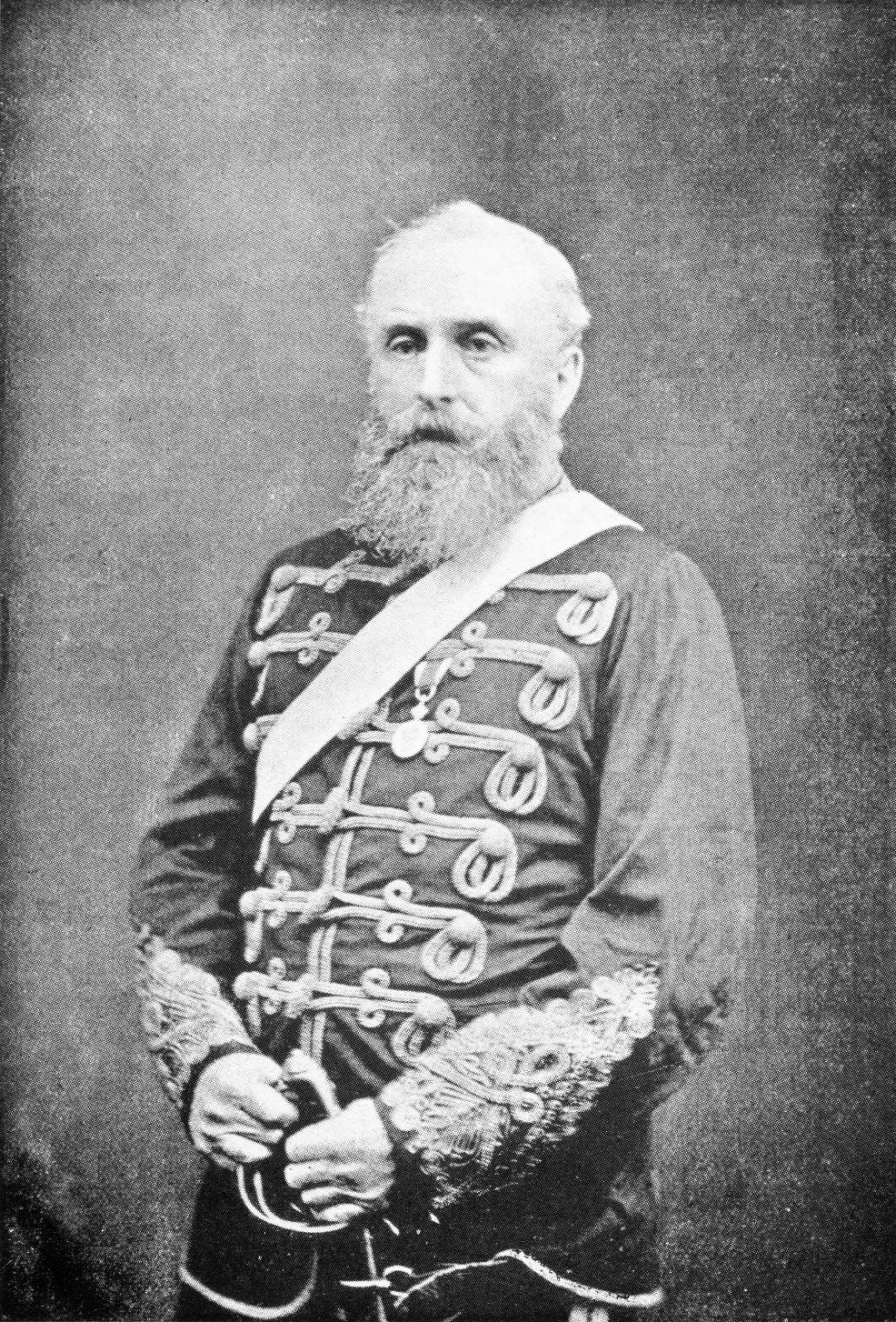

Colonel James Herbert Brockencote Hallen or J.H.B. Hallen CIE FRCSE FRCVS (1829 – 20 August 1901) was a British veterinarian who served as Principal of the Dick's Veterinary School in Edinburgh from for the academic year 1866/67 and later worked in British India. His is best remembered for his role as General Superintendent of Horse Breeding in India and Chief Veterinary Officer to India, for his work on the Indian cattle plagues and for writing manuals on the treatment of horses and livestock, some of which were translated into Hindi and Urdu languages.

== Life ==
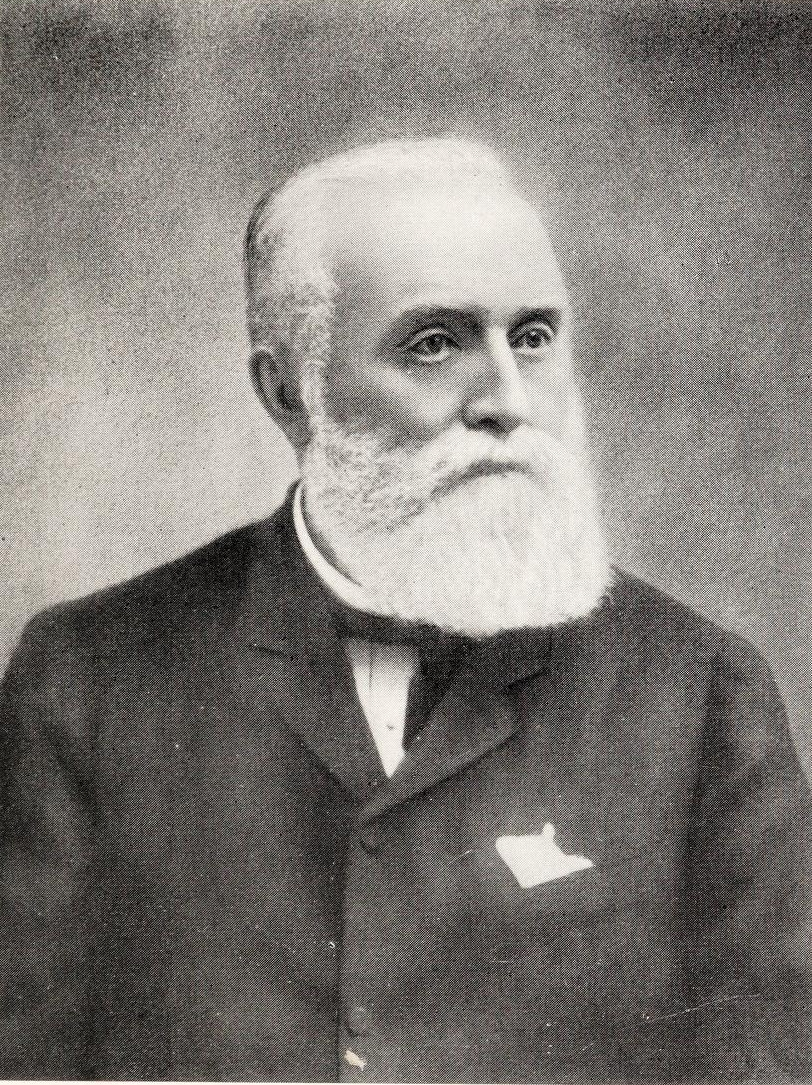

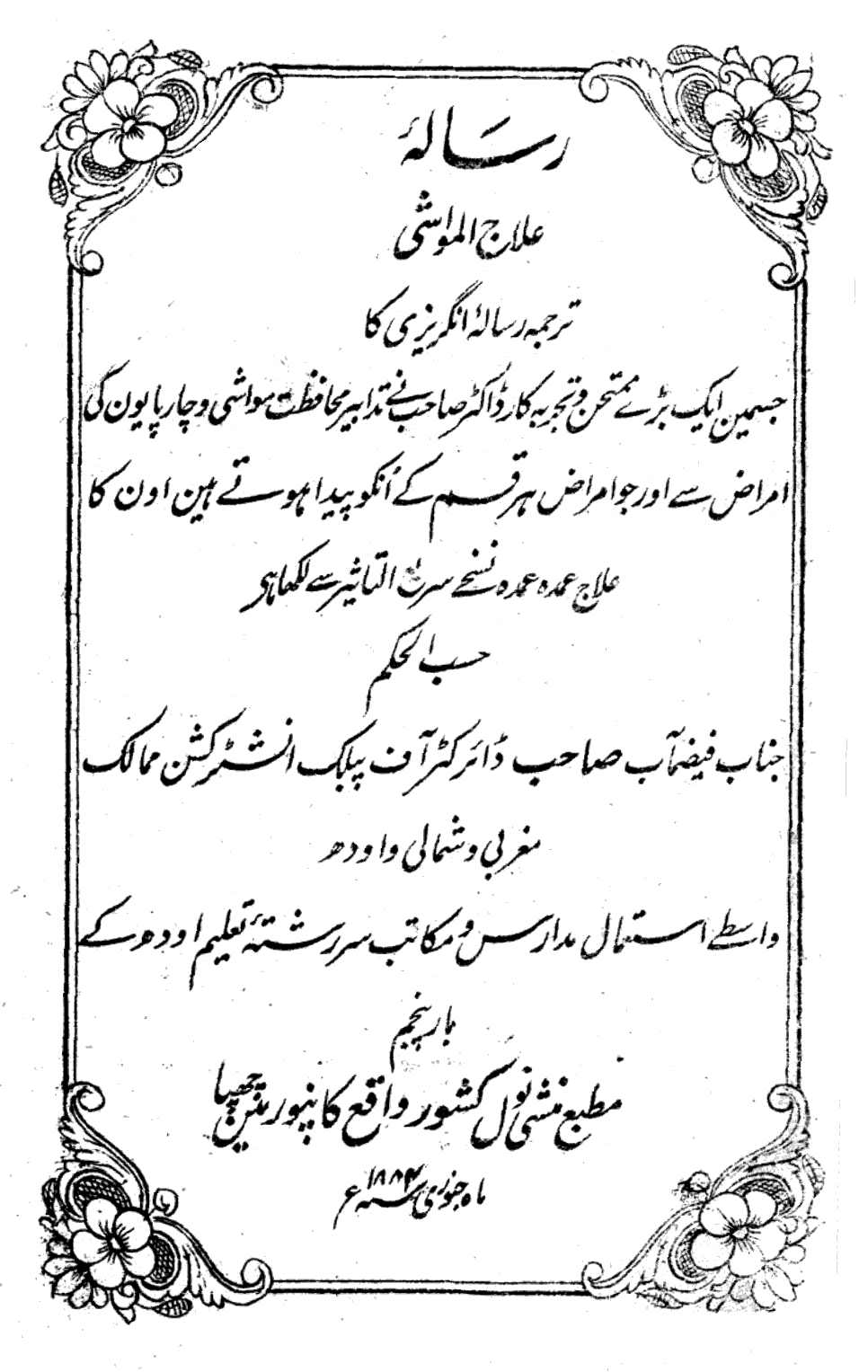
Title page of ʿIlāj al-mawāshī (1884)

James was the son of veterinary surgeon, Herbert Hallen, who worked with the Inniskilling Dragoons, and his wife Matilda. Herbert was known for his work with horses, wrote parts of the books by Sir Frederick Fitzwygram, and was involved in the design of the so-called Fitzwygram shoe. James studied Veterinary Science at William Dick's Veterinary College on Clyde Street in Edinburgh. In 1866 following the death of William Dick he served as principal of the college on an interim basis until the autumn of 1867 when he was replaced on a permanent basis by Prof William Williams. He joined the Bombay Veterinary Service in 1850 and then served with the 1st Bombay Lancers until 1855, followed by Remount purchasing until 1858 after which he was in the Bombay Horse Artillery. In 1862 he was made Inspecting Veterinary Surgeon and was involved in establishing the veterinary service, and the Army Veterinary School, Poona. He started a school for salutris (horse attendants) and castrators at Babugarh in the United Provinces in 1877. This was moved to Lahore in 1882 under Colonel G. Kettlewell and became the Punjab Veterinary College in 1900. He served in the Abyssinian War (1867–68) and was in charge of 50000 animals including cavalry and transport. He was recommended a medal by Lord Napier for his services but a C.B. could not be conferred as veterinary surgeons were ineligible. In 1868 he was dispatched to Bombay to deal with a sudden outbreak of cattle plague in India. He was placed in charge of a Special Stud Commission from 16 December 1872 to 31 March 1876 under the Viceroy. This was in response to Lord Northbrook's policy to breed horses and mules in India rather than import them from Australia and Persia as was the previous practice. Similar suggestions may have also been made during the time of Lord Mayo. Hallen also promoted the use of mares instead of oxen for ploughing. He was involved in the establishment of a civil veterinary department for which he was created a C.I.E. He retired as Inspector General of the Civil Veterinary Department. His examination of the outbreak of rinderpest led to the establishment of the Imperial bacteriological laboratory at Mukteshwar under Alfred Lingard.

He retired from service in India in 1894 and died in 1901 at Stratford-on-Avon from heart failure.

== Publications ==
A partial list of writings include:

- Report of the Indian Cattle Plagues (1871)
- Cattle Plague: A History (1871)
- Manual of the More Deadly Forms of Cattle Disease in India (1872)
- Some Diseases of Cattle in India
- Translated - ʿIlāj al-mawāshī (1874), Pasuchikitsa (Translated by Pandit Magan Lala 1875). Magan Lala's translation was of the Urdu/Hindustani version. Later Hanumanprasada and Deviprasada revised the Hindi work.
