= P. A. L. Wight =

20th-century British veterinarian and poultry researcher

P. A. L. Wight FRSE FRCVS FRCPath
- Born: Peter Albert Laing Wight; 3 July 1924; Leeds, England
- Died: 11 October 1998 (aged 74); Bonnyrigg, Midlothian, Scotland
- Occupation: Veterinary surgeon

Peter Albert Laing Wight (3 July 1924 – 11 October 1998) was a British veterinary surgeon and expert in poultry research.

== Life ==
He was born in Leeds on 3 July 1924, the son of Norman Laing Wight (b.1898), an executive in a meat company, and his wife Margaret Nevines. His parents belonged to the Fulneck Moravian Church.

When his mother died in 1927, his father sent him to Australia to live with his grandmother. He was returned to England in the summer of 1939, just before the outbreak of the Second World War. He was educated (as a boarder) at the Fulneck Moravian School in Pudsey, Yorkshire. He spent school holidays at his aunt's farm in Buckden, North Yorkshire.

In 1942, he began studies at the Royal (Dick) Veterinary College in Edinburgh. He graduated BSc in 1948 and began general practice as a vet in Stockton, but (preferring to work on large animals) assisted Mr Parkinson in Sedbergh in rural Yorkshire, working with farm animals.

In 1952, he returned to the Dick Vet College to undertake a doctorate (DVSM). This specialised in veterinary pathology. In 1953, he began Colonial Service at Zomba in Nyasaland (now Malawi). After around a year, he moved to the Central Laboratories in Blantyre under D. Faulkner. Here he mainly worked on mainstream African animal diseases such as Heartwater and Rabies. As these involve the animal's nervous system he moved onto the field of neuropathology.

In 1956, he returned to Britain to work at the Moredun Research Institute near Edinburgh at the invitation of Dr Zlotnik. Here he worked on sheep scrapie under John Stamp FRSE. Wight was awarded a PhD from the University of Edinburgh in 1960. That year, he moved to the Agricultural Research Council's Poultry Research Centre in Edinburgh under Alan William Greenwood.

In 1976, he was elected a Fellow of the Royal Society of Edinburgh. His proposers were Alan William Greenwood, Frank Alexander, Sir William Weipers, and John G. Campbell.

In 1981, (jointly with his colleague Tom Newman) he won the year's international award for Poultry Husbandry.

He retired in 1985 and died in Bonnyrigg south of Edinburgh on 11 October 1998.

== Family ==
In September 1949, he married Kathleen Best from Middlesbrough. They had two daughters: Vivien and Annette.

== Publications ==
- The Histopathology of Marek's Disease
- Oregon Disease in Turkeys
