= William Hunting =

British veterinary surgeon

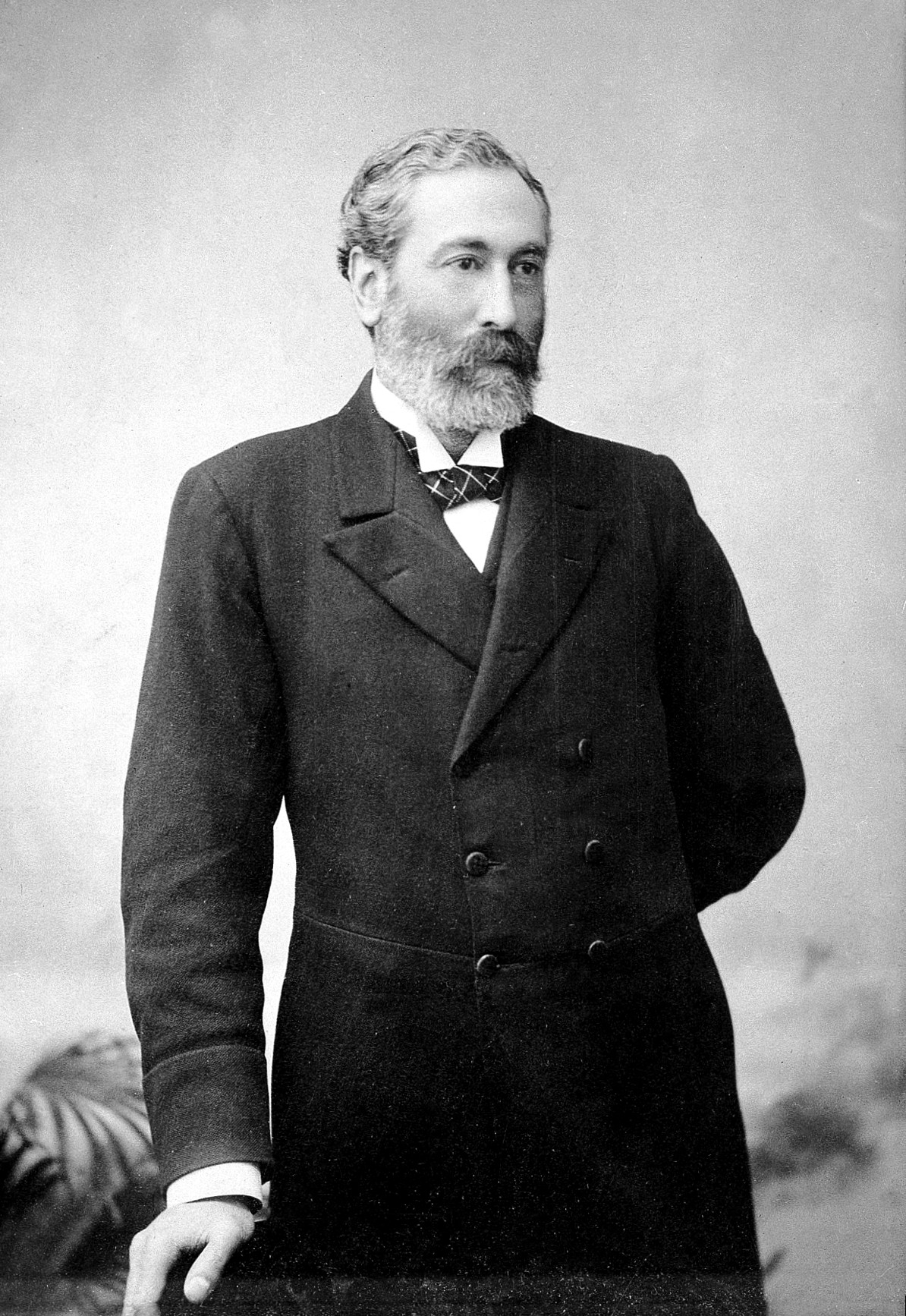
- Born: 1846; South Hetton, County Durham, England
- Died: 24 October 1913 (aged 67); London, England
- Education: Edinburgh Academy
- Alma mater: New Veterinary College, Edinburgh
- Known for: Study of glanders; founding The Veterinary Record
- Scientific career
- Fields: Veterinary science

William Hunting FRCVS (1846 – 24 October 1913) was a British veterinary surgeon who founded the weekly scientific journal The Veterinary Record, and remained its editor until his death. He was also an authority on the horse disease glanders, and on the shoeing of horses.

Hunting was born in County Durham, England, in 1846. His mother was Louise Higgins Hunting. His father, Charles Hunting, was a veterinary surgeon. Hunting was educated first at the Edinburgh Academy, and then attended the New Veterinary College in Edinburgh, Scotland, receiving his diploma and becoming a member of the Royal College of Veterinary Surgeons (RCVS) in 1865 at the age of 19. Following graduation, he joined the Royal Agricultural College in Cirencester as Professor of Veterinary Science, before moving after one year to teach at the Albert Veterinary College in London, before the college closed in 1868. He then went into private veterinary practice, and became a fellow of the RCVS in 1877.

Hunting founded the Veterinary Record, the first issue of which was published on 14 July, 1888, about which, he wrote:

Skilful observation makes a successful practitioner, but his skills die with him. By recording his observation he adds to the knowledge of his profession, and assists by his facts in building up the solid edifice of pathological science.

Hunting was recognised as an authority on glanders, a disease which affects horses, and was described in 1908 as being "greatest authority in the English-speaking world" on the subject by a speaker at the American Veterinary Medical Association's annual conference. In 1875, The Veterinary Journal was launched, and Hunting's paper on glanders was the first article in its first volume. His book on this subject, published in 1908, Glanders, a Clinical Treatise was lauded in a review in The Veterinary Journal, which stated "To praise it too highly would be impossible", and additionally praised the quality of the photographs and illustrations. While writing this book, Hunting was Chief Veterinary Inspector to London County Council, a position from which he retired only when he reached the maximum allowable age for the post.

In 1890, Hunting was president of the Central Veterinary Medical Society, was president of the Royal College of Veterinary Surgeons from 1894–1895, and was on the board of examiners for membership and fellowship of the college.

Hunting died at the age of 67 in a nursing home in London.

== Works ==
- Hunting, William (July 1875). "The increase and prevention of glanders". Veterinary Journal. 1. London: Ballière, Tindall & Cox: 1–5.
- Hunting, William (1898). The Art of Horse-shoeing: A Manual for Farriers. New York: William R. Jenkins. doi:10.5962/bhl.title.26666.
- Hunting, William (1906). "Glanders in horse and man". Transactions. Epidemiological Society of London. 25: 141–172. PMC 5548474. PMID 29419260.
- Hunting, William (1908). Glanders, a Clinical Treatise. H. & W. Brown – via Google Books.
