= Veterinary Record =

- Discipline: Veterinary medicine
- Language: English
- Edited by: Suzanne Jarvis

Publication details
- History: 1888–present
- Publisher: Wiley (United Kingdom)
- Frequency: Semi-monthly
- Impact factor: 2.695 (2020)

Standard abbreviations
- ISO 4: Vet. Rec.

Indexing
- CODEN: VETRAX
- ISSN: 0042-4900 (print); 2042-7670 (web)
- LCCN: sv89073252
- OCLC no.: 1769072

Links
- Journal homepage; Online access; Online archive

Veterinary Record, branded as Vet Record, is a semi-monthly peer-reviewed medical journal covering the field of veterinary medicine. It is published by Wiley on behalf of the British Veterinary Association and is distributed to its members as part of their membership. It was established in 1888.

== History ==
The journal was established in July 1888 by William Hunting, who is said to have started the journal with loans of £50 from another London veterinary surgeon, T. A. Dollar, which he never repaid, and £20 from Dollar's son, J.A W. Dollar. Although The Veterinarian (1828) and The Veterinary Journal (1844) were well established and covered some of the same ground as Hunting's new journal, the fact that Veterinary Record was published every week and carried verbatim reports of council and local association meetings gave it an immediacy that the other publications could not match.

The National Veterinary Medical Association of Great Britain and Ireland took over publication of the journal from January 1921.

From July 2009 to December 2020, the journal was published by the BMJ Group on behalf of the British Veterinary Association. From January 2021 has been published by Wiley.

== Abstracting and indexing ==
The journal is abstracted and indexed in:

- CAB Abstracts
- Current Contents/Agriculture, Biology & Environmental Sciences
- EBSCO databases
- Embase
- Index Medicus/MEDLINE/PubMed
- Science Citation Index Expanded
- Scopus

According to the Journal Citation Reports, the journal has a 2020 impact factor of 2.695.

== Most cited articles ==
According to the Web of Science, the following three articles have been cited most often:

1. Benestad SL, Sarradin P, Thu B, Schönheit J, Tranulis MA, Bratberg B (August 2003). "Cases of scrapie with unusual features in Norway and designation of a new type, Nor98". Veterinary Record. 153 (7): 202–8. doi:10.1136/vr.153.7.202. PMID 12956297. S2CID 19788587.
2. Gibbens JC, Sharpe CE, Wilesmith JW, Mansley LM, Michalopoulou E, Ryan JB, Hudson M (December 2001). "Descriptive epidemiology of the 2001 foot-and-mouth disease epidemic in Great Britain: the first five months". Veterinary Record. 149 (24): 729–43. doi:10.1136/vr.149.24.729. PMID 11808655. S2CID 43718744.
3. Whay HR, Main DC, Green LE, Webster AJ (August 2003). "Assessment of the welfare of dairy cattle using animal-based measurements: direct observations and investigation of farm records". Veterinary Record. 153 (7): 197–202. doi:10.1136/vr.153.7.197. PMID 12956296. S2CID 40615566.

== Brunus edwardii joke ==
The April Fools' Day 1972 issue included a paper on the diseases of Brunus edwardii: a description of lost limbs and thinning hair suffered by an animal whose Latin name means "brown" and "Edward". The paper was accompanied by sketches of a teddy bear resembling Winnie the Pooh.

== Popular culture ==
The journal is mentioned and appears regularly in the BBC series All Creatures Great and Small. In the episode "The Call of the Wild", the character based on James Herriot's assistant Brian Nettleton, has an article published in the Record, much to the chagrin of Herriot's partner Donald Sinclair.
