= Ernest Cotchin =

Ernest Cotchin FRCVS FRCPath
- Born: 23 August 1917
- Died: 27 September 1988 (aged 71)
- Occupation: Veterinary Surgeon

Ernest Cotchin (23 August 1917 – 27 September 1988) was Professor of Veterinary Pathology at the Royal Veterinary College between 1963 and 1982. He was Vice-Principal of the Royal Veterinary College from 1974 until 1988, and a world expert on neoplasia in domestic mammals. Cotchin's entire career was based at the Royal Veterinary College and, together with contributions to learned journals, he wrote a history of the Royal Veterinary College that was published posthumously with the help of a former colleague, Valerie Carter. His obituary in The Independent claimed his greatest achievements were in comparative pathology for which he was made a Fellow of the Royal College of Pathologists in 1964.

== Life ==
Ernest Cotchin was born on 23 August 1917. He was educated at Bedford Modern School and the University of London.

Cotchin's first piece of work was to complete a monograph for the Commonwealth Bureaux of Animal Health, examining tumours in domestic animals. His morphological work enabled him to identify, describe and classify the main tumours in domestic animals. In 1958, Cotchin was made President of the Central Veterinary Society and received its Victory Medal in 1962. Also In 1962, Cotchin spent six months at the Cornell University College of Veterinary Medicine researching tumours in dogs. He was impressed by the level of funding for scientific research in America.

Cotchin was made a Fellow of the Royal College of Pathologists in 1964. His work had wider implications for oncologists as he determined that cancer in the large intestine and stomach affected humans more than dogs, oesophageal and tongue cancer occurred in man and cats but not in any other domestic animal, and that cervical cancer didn't occur in dogs.

Cotchin's oncological work received praise from Sir Peter Medawar and he later became Vice-Principal of the Imperial Cancer Research Fund. Among his memberships of professional bodies, he was a President of the Section of Oncology at the Royal Society of Medicine, a Member of the Board of Trustees of the Hunterian Collection of the Royal College of Surgeons, a member of the Scientific Committee of the Marie Curie Memorial Fund and a member of the veterinary panel of the Wellcome Trust. He represented the Royal Veterinary College on the Council of Veterinary Surgeons between 1974 and 1982 and contributed to worldwide conferences on their behalf and on behalf of the Imperial Cancer Research Fund. He was also a regular attendee at meetings of the World Health Organization.

== Personal life ==
Cotchin had a particular interest in paintings and also played the piano and the organ. He died on 27 September 1988. His memorial service was held at Old St Pancras Church in London, the address being read by Sir David Innes Williams.

== Selected works ==
- The Royal Veterinary College, London: a bicentenary history, by Ernest Cotchin and Valerie Carter. Published 1990, Buckingham, England, by Barracuda Books
- Animal Tumors of the Female Reproductive Tract Spontaneous and Experimental, by Ernest Cotchin and June Marchant, 1977, New York
- Neoplasms of the domesticated mammals, a review, by Ernest Cotchin and the Commonwealth Agricultural Bureaux, 1956. Published by the Commonwealth Agricultural Bureaux, England
- Pathology of laboratory rats and mice, by Ernest Cotchin and Francis Roe, 1967. Published by Blackwell, Oxford
