= Alasdair Steele-Bodger =

Alasdair Steele-Bodger (1 January 1924 – 17 September 2008) was a British veterinary surgeon.

== Early life and education ==
Steele-Bodger was born in Lichfield, Staffordshire, the son of Harry Steele-Bodger, also a noted vet, and the elder brother of Micky Steele-Bodger, another vet and also England international rugby player. He was educated at Shrewsbury School before reading Natural Sciences at Gonville and Caius College, Cambridge and qualifying as a vet at the Royal (Dick) Veterinary School, University of Edinburgh.

== Career ==
Steele-Bodger practised as a Veterinary Surgeon in Lichfield from 1948 until 1977 and then for two years in Fordingbridge, Hampshire. In 1979 he was appointed Professor of Veterinary Clinical Studies at the University of Cambridge, a post which he held until 1990.

Steele-Bodger was President of the British Small Animal Veterinary Association in 1962, President of the British Veterinary Association from 1965 to 1966 and President of the Royal College of Veterinary Surgeons in 1972 to 1973.

== Honours ==
Steele-Bodger was appointed a CBE in 1980.

== Marriage and children ==
Steele-Bodger married Anne Finlayson in 1948 and they had three daughters.

== Death ==
Steele-Bodger died in Monmouth on 17 September 2008 at the age of 84.
