= Royal College of Veterinary Surgeons =

Professional association based in the United Kingdom

- Abbreviation: RCVS
- Established: 1844
- Legal status: Professional association
- Headquarters: 1 Hardwick Street, London
- Coordinates: 51.5184085°N 0.1123397°W
- President: Timothy Parkin
- Website: Official website

The Royal College of Veterinary Surgeons (RCVS) is the regulatory body for veterinary surgeons in the United Kingdom, established in 1844 by royal charter. It is responsible for monitoring the educational, ethical and clinical standards of the veterinary profession. Anyone wishing to practice as a vet in the United Kingdom must be registered with the RCVS.

== Role ==
- To safeguard the health and welfare of animals committed to veterinary care through the regulation of the educational, ethical and clinical standards of the veterinary profession, thereby protecting the interests of those dependent on animals and assuring public health.
- To act as an impartial source of informed opinion on animal health and welfare issues and their interaction with human health.

Anyone who wishes to practice as a vet in the United Kingdom must first register with the RCVS. Eligibility for registration is based either on having a recognised qualification or by passing the RCVS statutory membership examination. After registration, the vet is entitled to use the letters MRCVS (Member of the Royal College of Veterinary Surgeons) or FRCVS (Fellow of the Royal College of Veterinary Surgeons) after their name.

During the ceremony of admission to the RCVS, members make a declaration:

I PROMISE AND SOLEMNLY DECLARE that I will pursue the work of my profession with integrity and accept my responsibilities to the public, my clients, the profession and the Royal College of Veterinary Surgeons, and that, ABOVE ALL, my constant endeavour will be to ensure the health and welfare of animals committed to my care.

== Royal charter ==
The 1844 charter regulates particular aspects of the college's management of its affairs and gives it the power to award fellowships, diplomas and certificates to veterinary surgeons, veterinary nurses, and others engaged in veterinary science and its auxiliary sciences.

The statutory duties of the RCVS are laid out in the Veterinary Surgeons Act 1966.

== Disciplinary committee ==
The Disciplinary Committee of the Royal College of Veterinary Surgeons hears charges against veterinary surgeons accused of serious professional misconduct or being unfit to practice because of a criminal conviction.

Appeals from decisions of the Disciplinary Committee are heard by the Judicial Committee of the Privy Council.

== Officials ==
In order to carry out its statutory duties a council of 33 members governs the RCVS and meets eight times a year. The President, vice-presidents (two), and Treasurer are elected by Council and together with the Chief Executive and Head of Legal Services/Registrar, form a team of officers who have the main responsibility for running the RCVS.

== Publications ==
- Colours and Markings of Horses (revised 2005 and distributed by Weatherbys Bookshop)
- Directory of Veterinary Practices (annual, published in October)
- RCVS Annual Report (annual, published in June)
- RCVS Guide to Professional Conduct (revised 2006)
- RCVS News (newsletter – March/June/November)
- Register of Members (annual, published in November)
- Veterinary Nurses List (annual, published in March)

== Past presidents ==
- James Beart Simonds (1862–1863)
- William Hunting (1894–1895)
- Orlando Charnock Bradley (1920–1922)
- John Share Jones (1928–1929)
- Thomas Dalling (1949–51)
- Olga Uvarov (1976–1977)
- Judy MacArthur Clark (1992-1993)
- Alasdair Steele-Bodger (1972–1973)
- Richard Halliwell (2003–2004)
- Alexander Trees, Baron Trees (2009–2010)
- Stuart Reid (academic) (2014-2015)

== Current and former notable fellows ==
- Mary Brancker
- Joseph Henry Carter
- Judy MacArthur Clark
- Ernest Cotchin
- Thomas Dalling
- Walter George Burnett Dickinson
- Sydney Dodd
- James Hallen
- James Herriot
- Andrew Higgins
- William Hunting
- James McCall
- Quintin McKellar
- Anna Meredith
- Brian Perry
- Alexander Robertson
- R. N. Smith
- Alasdair Steele-Bodger
- J. S. Steward
- Olga Uvarov
- P. A. L. Wight
- William Williams
- William Owen Williams

== See also ==
- Veterinary medicine in the United Kingdom
- Royal Veterinary College
- Royal College of Veterinary Surgeons Charitable Trust
