= William Dick (veterinary surgeon) =

Scottish veterinarian

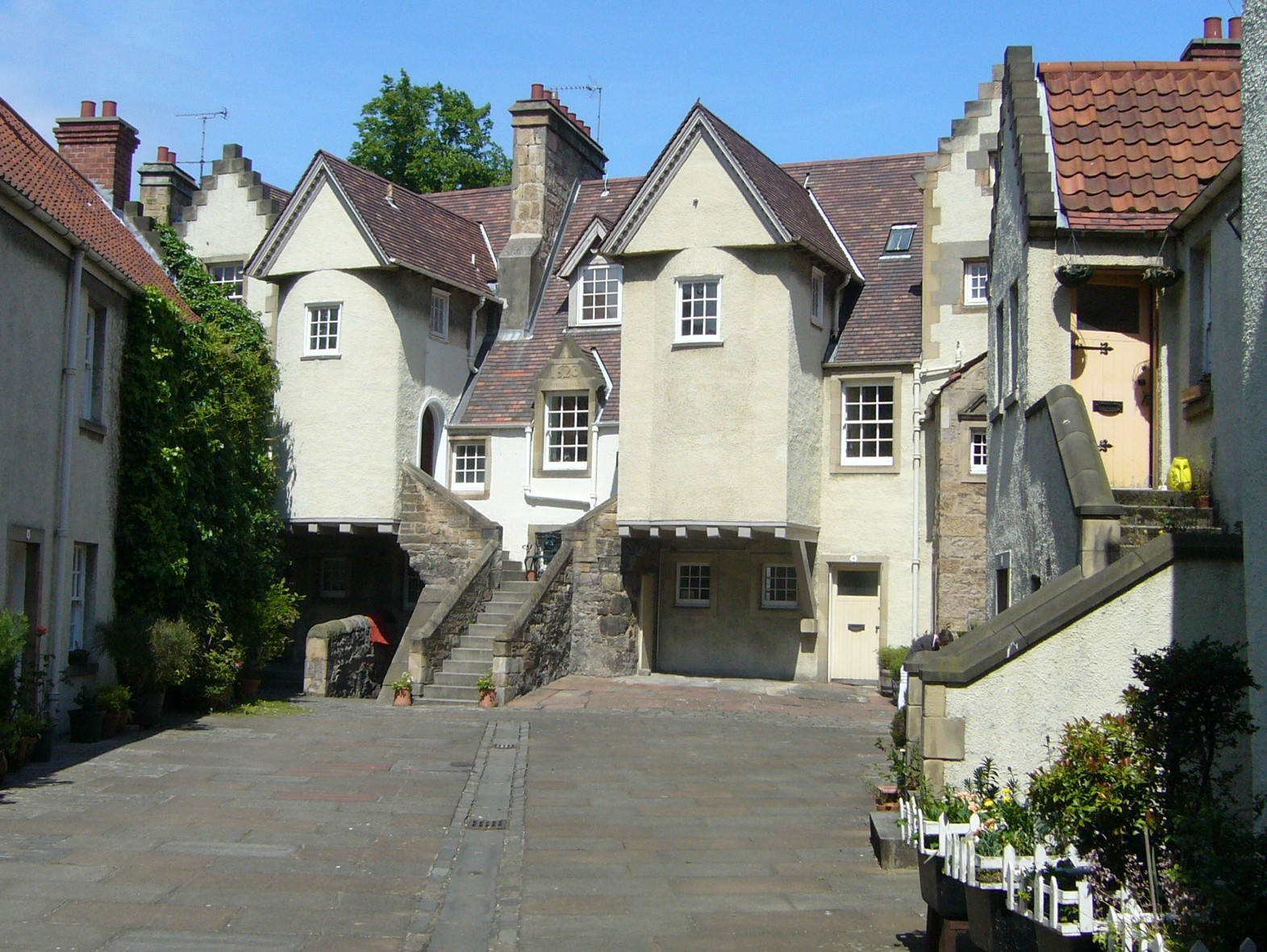
White Horse Close, birthplace of William Dick

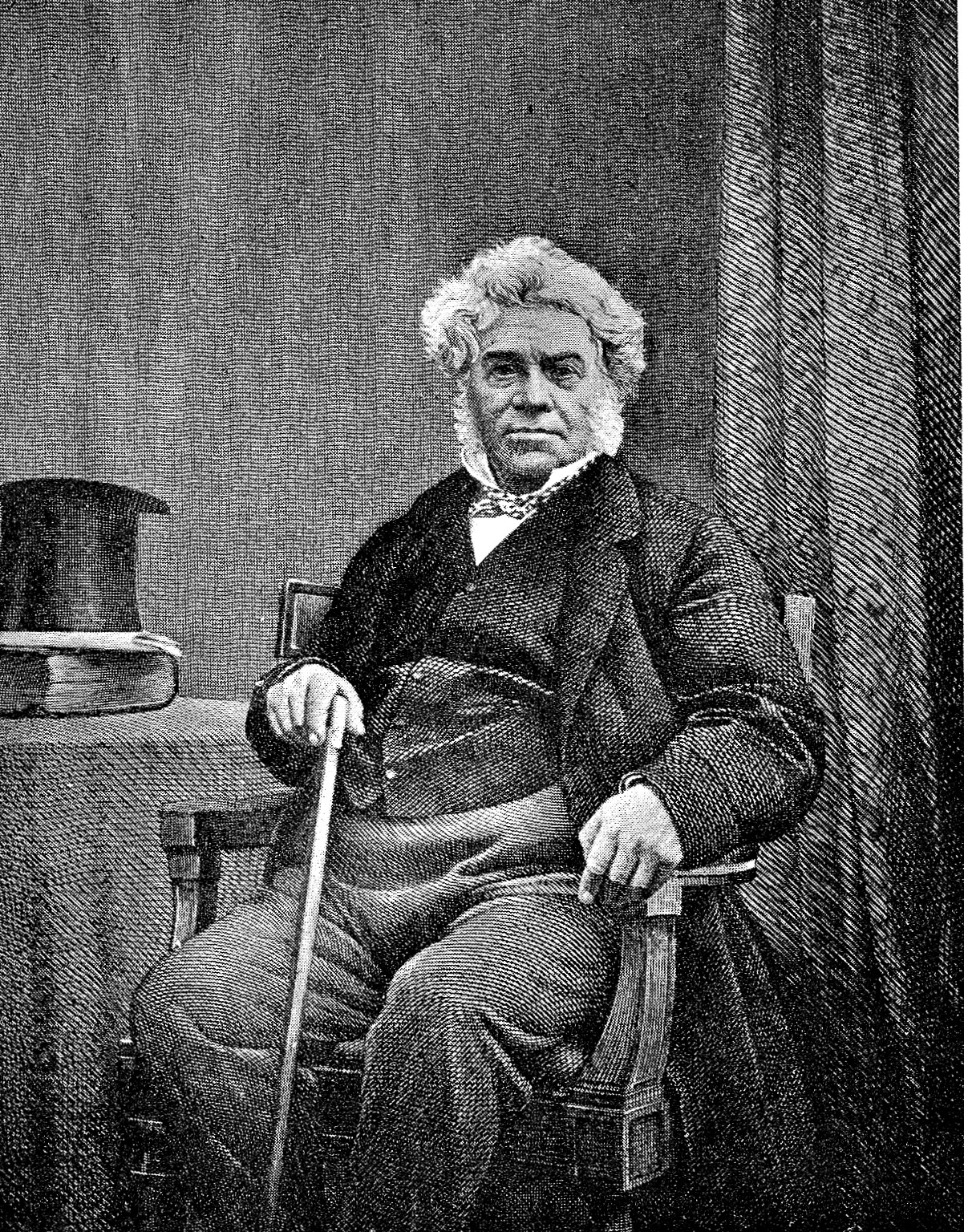
Professor William Dick, veterinary surgeon

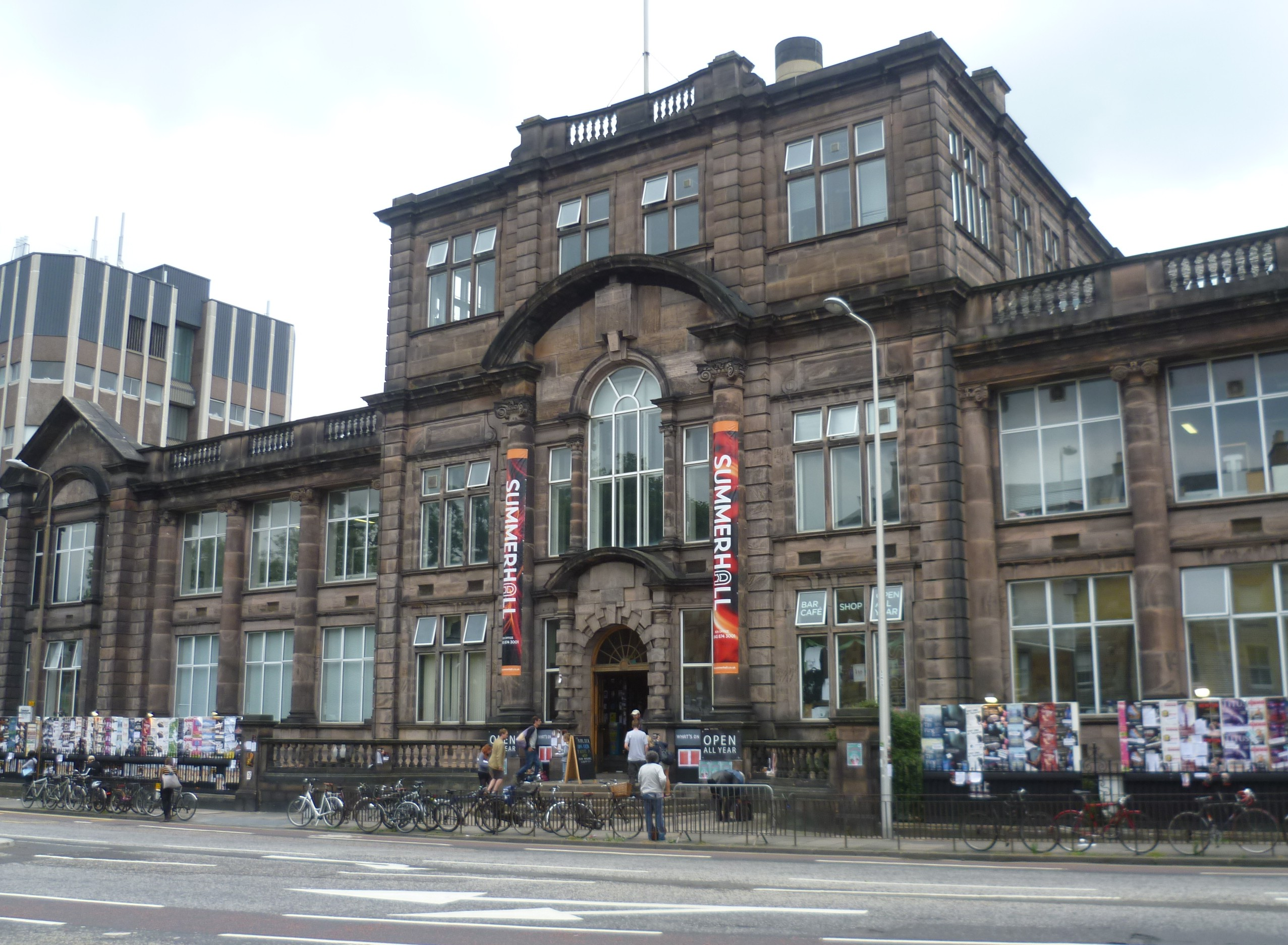
Summerhall, Edinburgh, built as William Dick’s Vet College

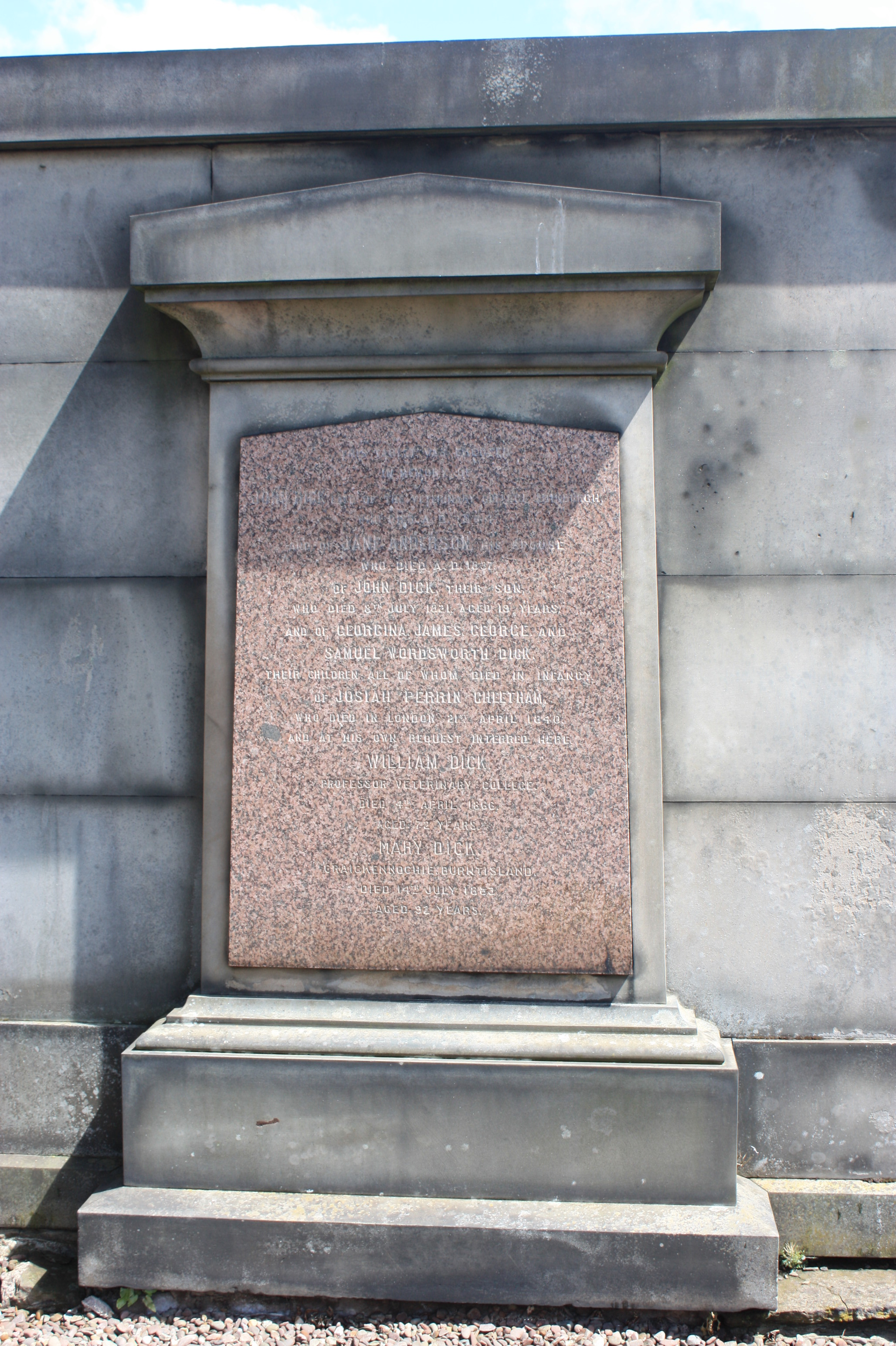
William Dick's grave, New Calton Burial Ground

William Dick (6 May 1793 – 4 April 1866) was a Scottish veterinarian and founder of the Dick Vet School in Edinburgh, the first veterinary college in Scotland. He is responsible for major advances in the field of veterinary science and the profession as a whole.

== Life ==
He was born in White Horse Close on the Canongate on Edinburgh’s Royal Mile on 6 May 1793 to Jane (Jean) Anderson (c.1765–1837) and John Dick (1769-1844). His father was a blacksmith and farrier who had moved from Aberdeen with his wife, six years prior to William being born.

He was educated by the Reverend J. Robinson at Paul’s Work, a small complex of buildings where Waverley train station now stands. His higher education was at Mr Keeson’s School in Shakespeare Square, at the east end of Princes Street. In 1815 the family moved to a courtyard off a back lane in the New Town, Edinburgh, 15 Clyde Street.

The following year he began extra-mural classes, studying anatomy under Dr John Barclay. He remained friends with Barclay until his death. Due to his background he decided to combine his love of horses with the study of anatomy, and at Barclay’s suggestion, travelled to London late in 1817, to specifically study as a veterinary surgeon under Edward Coleman in Camden Town. The study here was brief and he received his Diploma in January 1818 after three months.

He returned to Edinburgh to establish his own veterinary college, based at his father’s courtyard, and with the support of his sister, Mary Dick, and a patron, John Corse Scott of Sinton. After a slow start, with only four students in 1819, greater progress began to be made. The course consisted of two lectures per week for 23 weeks. Covering anatomy and diseases of a range of large animals, chiefly farm stock and dogs. He also encouraged his students to attend extra-mural anatomy lectures at the University of Edinburgh Medical School. The college expanded to absorb other buildings on Clyde Street over the next 20 years.

The process was executed in liaison with the Highland Society, who at the end of the course issued a certificate, following an oral examination, to say the student was competent to practice "the veterinary art".

After much fame and success Queen Victoria appointed him as Veterinary to the Queen in 1838 and the Clyde Street premises displayed a royal coat-of-arms from that date.

By his death in 1866 he had trained 818 students who had gone on to practice around the globe.

He died on 4 April 1866 and was buried in New Calton Burial Ground overlooking his original birthplace and family home just to the south. The grave lies just to the north-east of the central crossing of the main paths, facing west. His will stipulated that his fortune on death must be held in trust and used to continue to run the college.

Following his death the college was briefly run by Colonel James Hallen, but Hallen was obliged to travel to India to tackle an outbreak of cattle plague. In May 1867 William Williams took over as principal.

== Legacy ==
In 1906 the College was officially named the Royal (Dick) Veterinary College by Act of Parliament. It is referred to as the "Dick Vet". In 1916 it moved to a purpose-built new home at Summerhall in the South Side of Edinburgh, which had been built 1913-1915, with some disruption due to the First World War. It became part of the University of Edinburgh in 1951. In 2011 it relocated outside the city to the Easter Bush campus next to the Roslin Institute.

== Artistic recognition ==
A portrait of 1851 of William Dick by Tavernor Knott is held by the University of Edinburgh.

His bust by George Clark Stanton previously stood in the Dick Vet School.

== Other positions held ==
- Justice of the Peace
- Moderator of the High Constables of Edinburgh 1842-3
- Lord Dean of Guild for Edinburgh, 1843-1845
- Deacon of the Guild of Hammermen
- Deacon Convenor of the Trades of Edinburgh
- Editor of The Veterinarian
