= White Horse Close =

Courtyard in Edinburgh, Scotland

Coordinates: 55.95275°N 3.17559°W

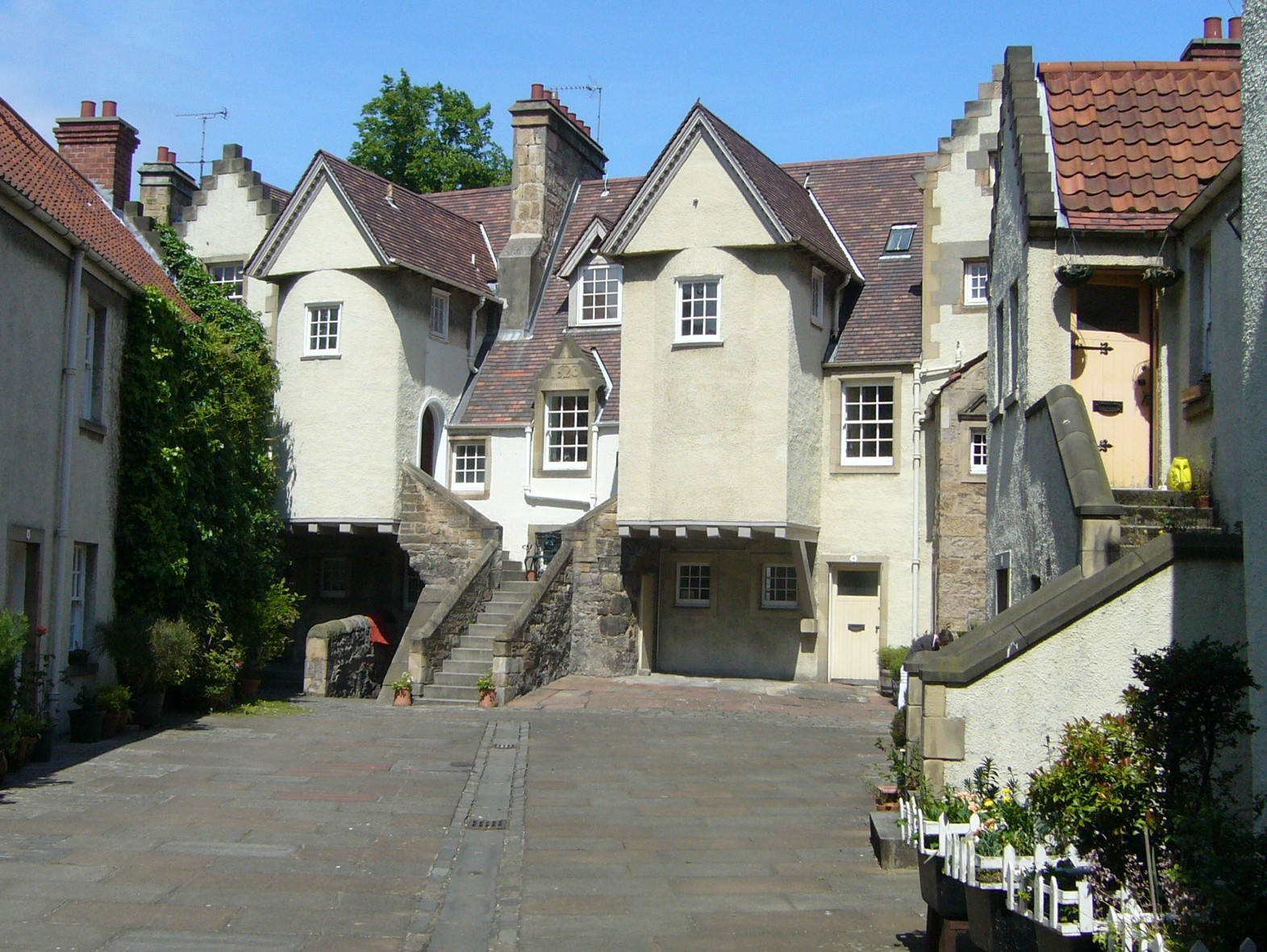
White Horse Close

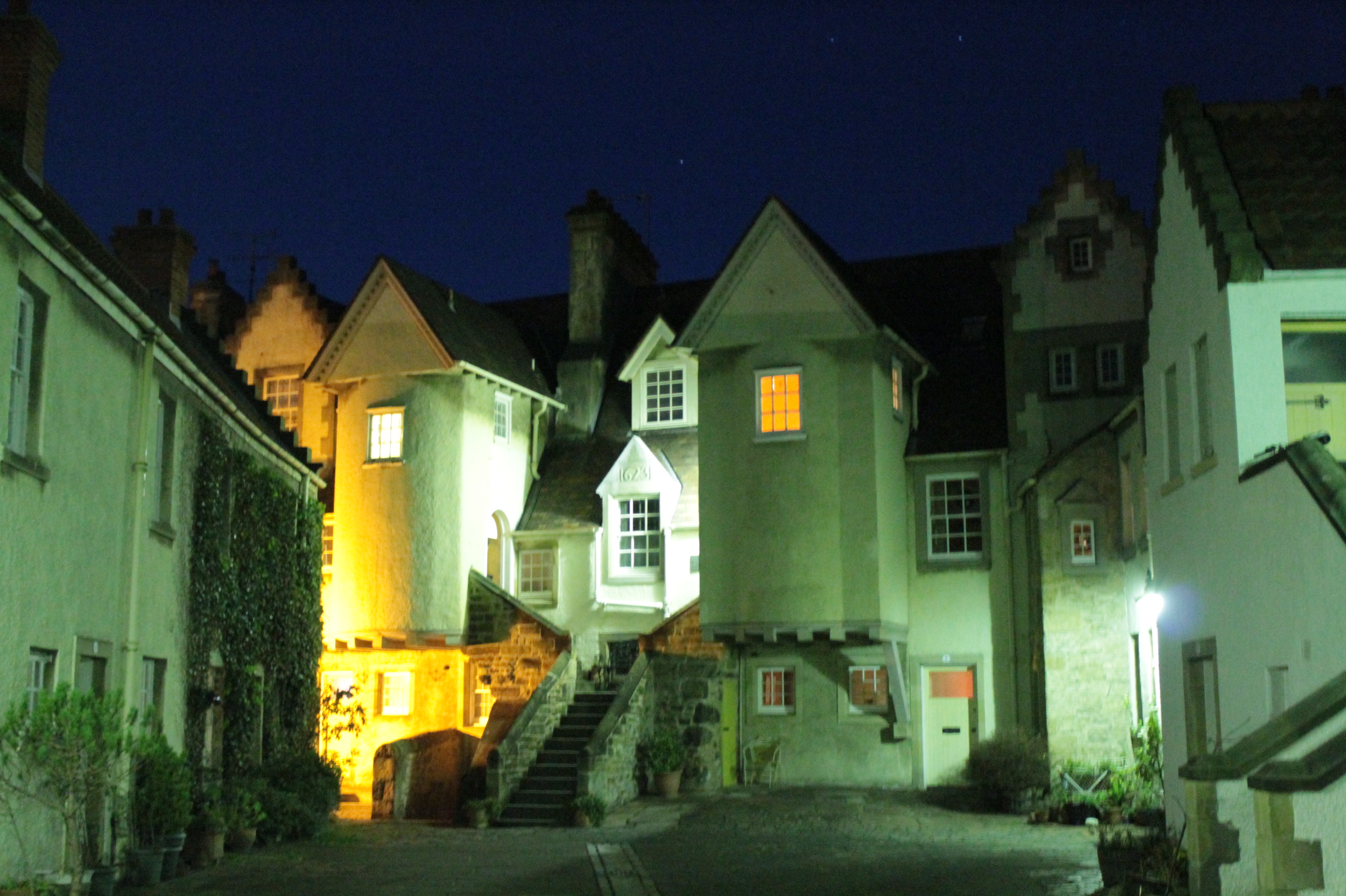
White Horse Close at night

White Horse Close, or "Whitehorse Close", is an enclosed courtyard off the Canongate at the foot of the Royal Mile at the eastern end of the Old Town of Edinburgh, Scotland.

== History ==
It was formerly known as "Ord's Close", after Laurence Ord, the putative builder of the 17th-century inn at its northern end. Because of several conversions to its buildings in the past, the close has been described as "so blatantly fake that it can be acquitted of any intention to deceive". Professor Charles McKean has characterised it as "heritage rather than history".

The origin of the name is obscure. The location has been traditionally associated with a royal mews from the time of Mary, Queen of Scots, the name being said to derive from the fact that her favourite white palfrey was stabled there, near the main entrance to the royal palace. It is more likely, however, that the name derives from the "White Horse Inn" which occupied the northern end of the courtyard from at least the 17th century. It has also been suggested that the name may have come from a later 18th century inn sign displaying the White Horse of Hanover.

It is recorded that some of the leaders of the Covenanting party in Scotland, including James Graham, earl of Montrose, attempted to set out from the inn in the close for Berwick to parley with King Charles I after the Treaty of Berwick had been signed to end the First Bishops' War in June 1639. Their departure was blocked by a mob which feared the meeting might lead to a betrayal of the principles of the National Covenant. Montrose alone slipped through to join the King, to whom he gradually transferred allegiance. Over a decade later, in 1650, he passed the head of the close again, entering Edinburgh at the foot of the Canongate as a captive on his way to trial and execution for treason.

The building bears the date 1632, but this is believed to have been carved when it was restored in the 1930s, the tablet being altered from displaying the more implausible date of 1532. In his Views of Edinburgh, published around 1820, the English engraver James Storer gave the date as 1683, which is more in keeping with the late 17th-century architectural style of the buildings. The dilapidated close was bought by Dr. John Barbour and his sister in 1889, and the inn, with its distinctive forestairs, and the surrounding courtyard buildings were converted into fifteen dwellings for the working class. They were last restored by Frank Mears & Partners between 1961 and 1964.

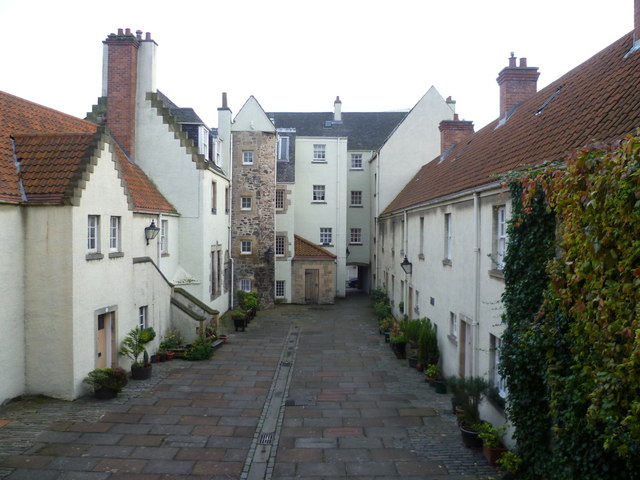
White Horse Close from the steps of the former White Horse Inn

The inn was the departure point for the stagecoaches that ran between Edinburgh, Newcastle and London in the 18th century. Five arches on the Calton Road side of the building (previously known as the North Back of the Canongate) indicate the former existence of an undercroft which contained the inn's stables, smithy and coach houses. These were accessed from the rear of the building at a considerably lower ground level compared with the courtyard of the close. A small descending flight of steps and narrow pend still connects the courtyard with the rear of the inn building.

The inn should not be confused with another inn of the same name (later known as "Boyd's inn" after one of its owners) which existed in St. Mary's Wynd (now St. Mary's Street) near the head of the Canongate between 1635 and 1868. This was where Pasquale Paoli came with Count Burzyuski in September 1771 and James Boswell welcomed Samuel Johnson on his arrival in Edinburgh in August 1773.

The building with a turnpike stair immediately on the right when entering the close was the residence of two Bishops of Edinburgh from the time when the church of St. Giles was a cathedral, namely John Paterson (1632-1708) and Alexander Rose (1647-1720).

Tradition maintains that Jacobite officers were billeted in the close during Charles Edward Stuart's occupation of nearby Holyrood Palace during the Jacobite Rebellion of 1745.

A wall plaque inside the close records it as the birthplace in 1793 of William Dick, son of a farrier and founder of the Royal (Dick) School of Veterinary Studies.

The close is widely regarded as the most picturesque group of buildings on the Royal Mile, but is often overlooked by visitors to the city who fail to enter the pend which connects it to the Canongate.

== Restoration ==
In 1902 the dilapidated buildings were purchased by Dr Alexander Barbour and his sister, both active members of the Edinburgh Social Union. The Union had previously (1897) reorganised the management of Chessels Court to the west, and set about the same for Whitehouse Close using contemporary social ideals. However, the area was still considered a "slum" in 1906 and not until the comprehensive rebuilding of the Canongate in the 1950s and 60s was the courtyard properly restored. This was done as Council housing but under the rights to buy introduced in the 1970s all are now privately owned.

The main restoration was undertaken by Sir Frank Mears from 1961 to 1964.

A well, found in 1986, is delineated with a circle of cobbles in the courtyard.
