= Thomas Dalling =

Scottish veterinarian

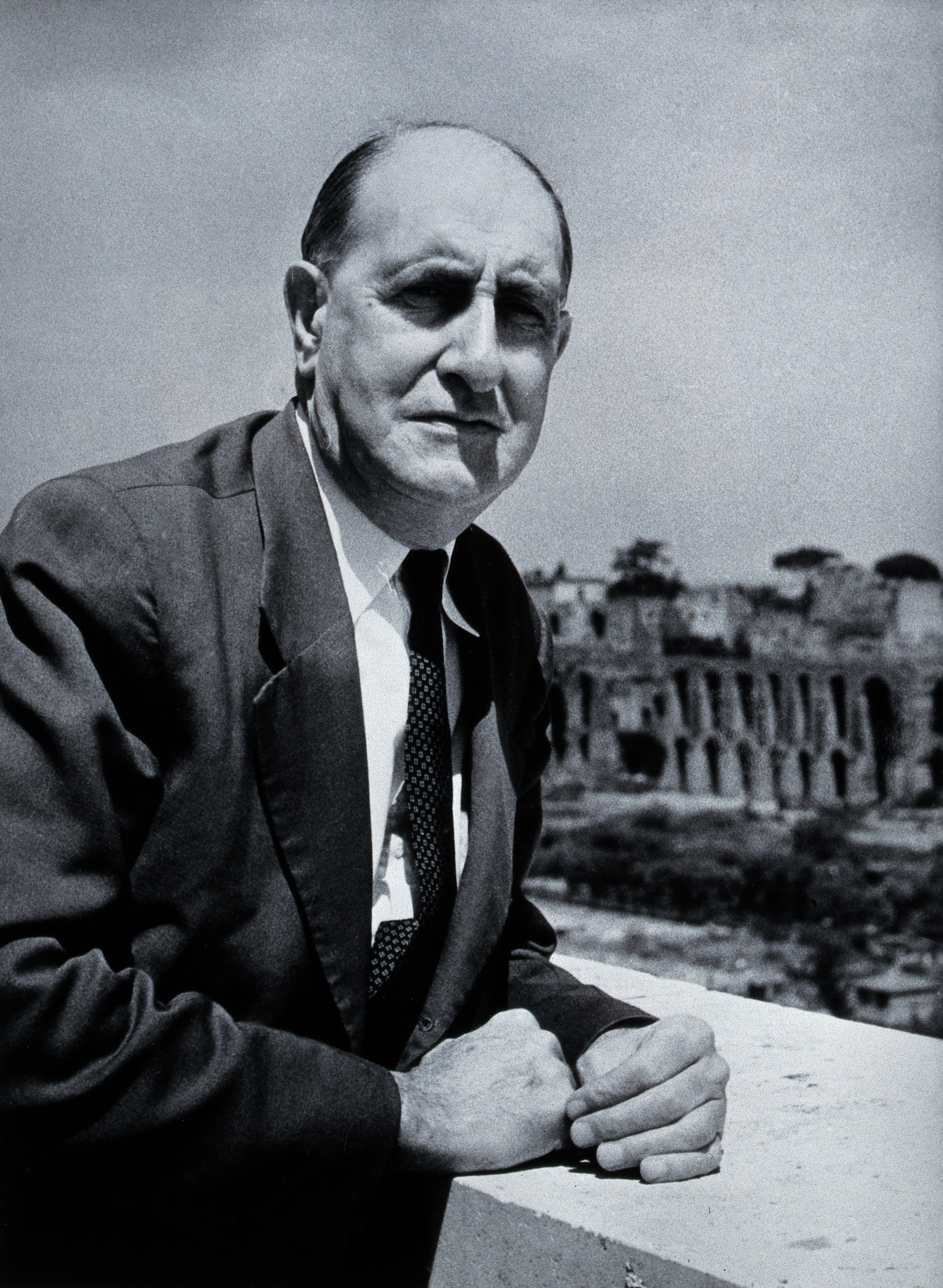
Sir Thomas Dalling

Sir Thomas Dalling (23 April 1892 – 23 May 1982) was a Scottish veterinarian and lifelong champion of veterinary research and education.

From 1948 to 1952 he held the office of Chief Veterinary Officer to the United Kingdom.

== Life ==
Dalling was born at 77 Howdenhall Road, his father's blacksmith's cottage next to the forge in Liberton, Edinburgh. He was educated at George Heriot's School in Edinburgh and then attended the Royal Dick Veterinary College, now the Royal (Dick) School of Veterinary Studies, graduating MRCVS in 1914. During the First World War he served in the Army Veterinary Corps in France reaching the rank of Major and Mentioned in Dispatches. His war service introduced him to field laboratories where he became fascinated by bacteriology.

On return from war service he joined Sidney Gaiger, Principal of Glasgow Veterinary College, who had laboratories and experimental animals accommodation for his work on sheep diseases. In 1920, they joined a group of Scottish farmers to found the Animal Diseases Research Association (ADRA), now Moredun Foundation, with the aim of improving the health of livestock, especially sheep. In 1922, Gaiger and Dalling transferred their work to the ADRA's institute at Moredun near Edinburgh.

In 1923, Dalling joined the Wellcome Research Laboratories at Beckenham, Kent. Here, he successfully elucidated the clostridial diseases of sheep, developing a polyvalent vaccine which transformed the economics of sheep farming and which established Burroughs Wellcome & Co's commercially very successful veterinary division.

A lifelong advocate of the fundamental importance of research and education, in 1937 Dalling was appointed Professor of Animal Pathology at Cambridge University with the intention that he would head the proposed new veterinary school recommended by the 1937 Loveday Report on veterinary education. However, World War II postponed the opening of Cambridge Veterinary School until 1949.

In 1938, together with Harry Steele-Bodger, he was one of the co-founders of the Society of Veterinary Practitioners.

In 1942, he was elected a Fellow of the Royal Society of Edinburgh.

Later in 1942, he moved to become Director of the Central Veterinary Laboratory (CVL) at Weybridge. Here, he was instrumental in integrating the laboratories attached to various agricultural colleges into a national Veterinary Investigation Service for disease monitoring and to feed the research of the CVL. During the war years, Dalling, George Gould, Sam Hignett and Harry Steele-Bodger, travelled throughout Britain training practising veterinarians in animal problems of wartime economic importance, such as fertility, mastitis and Johne's Disease.

Dalling was Chief Veterinary Officer of the Ministry of Agriculture, Fisheries and Food from 1948-52. He promoted major programmes of farm animal disease eradication and drove the consolidation of much disparate legislation affecting animals into the Diseases of Animals Act of 1950.

He was knighted in the 1951 New Year Honours.

Thereafter, Dalling was very active at the Office International des Epizooties (OIE), now World Organisation for Animal Health, established in 1924 to control epizootic diseases at a global level, such as establishing a cordon sanitaire in south eastern Europe to prevent the devastating period waves of rinderpest and foot-and-mouth disease from the Middle East into Europe. From 1954 to 1958 he served as Secretary to the European Commission for the Control of Foot and Mouth Disease.

During this time until the mid-1960s, Dalling also travelled widely working for the Food and Agriculture Organization of the United Nations (FAO), advising on the establishment of state veterinary services, national and regional veterinary laboratories, and national and regional veterinary schools.

He received multiple honorary degrees: LLD from Glasgow, Toronto and Edinburgh; DSc from Belfast and Bristol; and a Doctor of Veterinary Medicine (DVM) from the University of Hannover.

== Death ==
Sir Thomas Dalling died one month after his 90th birthday, in the cottage where he was born.

== Artistic recognition ==
A photograph of Dalling by Walter Stoneman is held by the National Portrait Gallery in London.

His portrait was also painted by Josef Franz Strachota in 1956 and forms part of the University of Edinburgh art Collection.

== Publications ==
- International Encyclopaedia of Veterinary Medicine (1966) generally known as the IEVM
- Guide to Sources for Agricultural and Biological Research (1966) editor-in-chief
