= Poll evil =

Equine disease

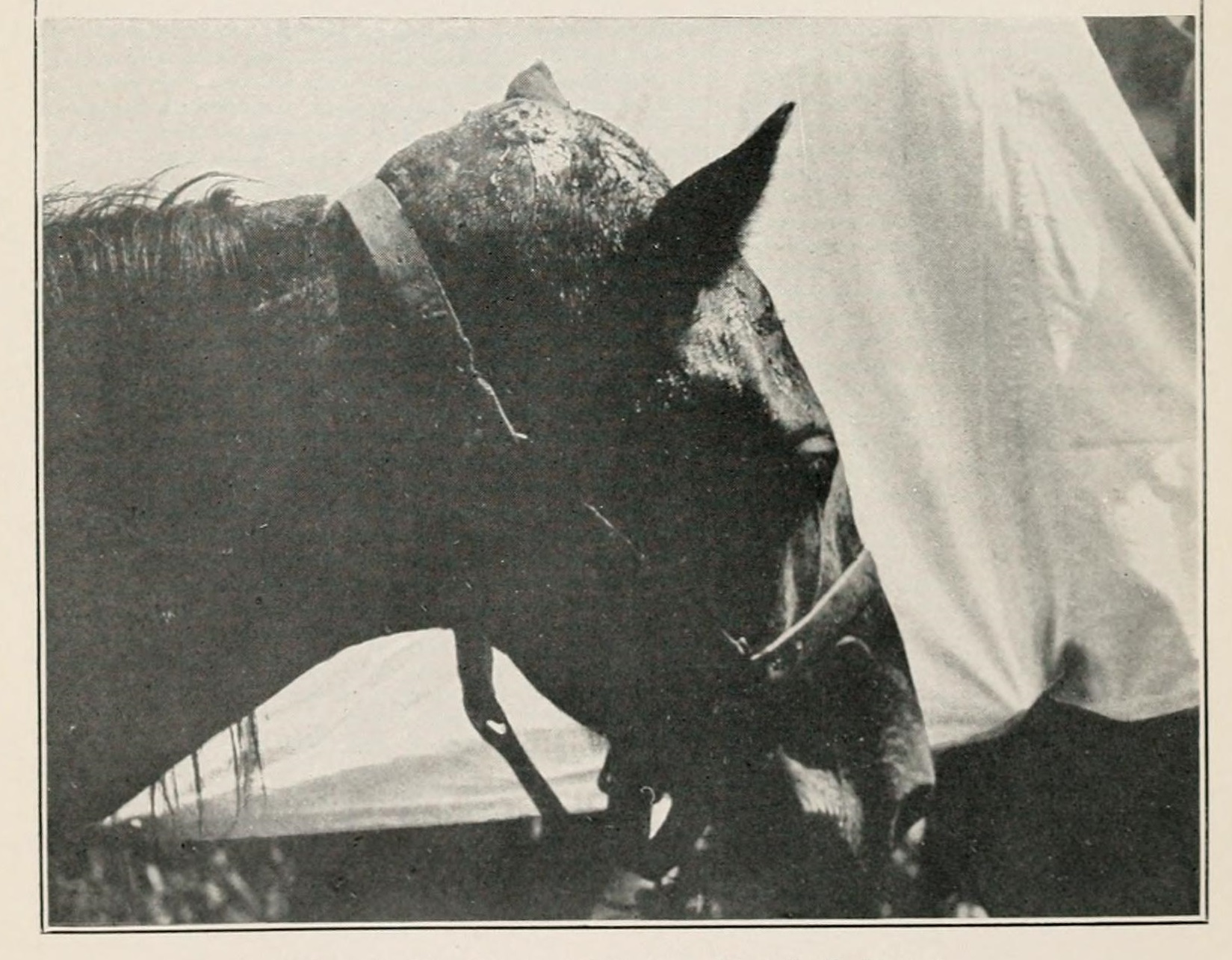

Poll evil is a traditional term for a painful condition in a horse or other equid, that starts as an inflamed bursa at the cranial end of the neck between vertebrae and the nuchal ligament, and swells until it presents as an acute swelling at the poll, on the top of the back of the animal's head. The swelling can increase until it ruptures and drains. It can be caused by infection from Actinomyces bovis or Brucella abortus organisms, but may also occur due to parasite infestation, skin trauma, or badly fitting horse tack. Because of modern efforts to reduce the incidence of brucellosis in livestock, horses are less exposed to the Brucella abortus organism, and hence most modern cases of poll evil arise from trauma linked to a horse striking its head against poorly designed or low-clearance structures, or to improper use of equipment, particularly leaving a halter on the horse around the clock.

The term has been in use since at least the 1750s. Before modern antibiotics were developed, the condition was very difficult to treat. In the 18th century, it was treated with remedies such as vinegar, wine, elder flower and even turpentine. The 1820 folk remedy text The Long Lost Friend by John George Hohman prescribes defecating on twigs of cherry trees wrapped in rags, after having been used to swab the poll evils, then using the same soiled rags to clean the wounds again, repeating the process for several days. Today, cases caught early can be cleaned with peroxide, ice packs and diluted dimethyl sulfoxide solution, with antibiotics used to prevent or slow infection. If the infection has set in and there is a discharge, antibiotic treatment along with hot packs and surgery under local anesthesia to remove infected and dead tissue is usually required.

Fistulous withers is a similar condition but on the animal's withers.
