= William Williams (veterinary surgeon) =

Welsh veterinary surgeon

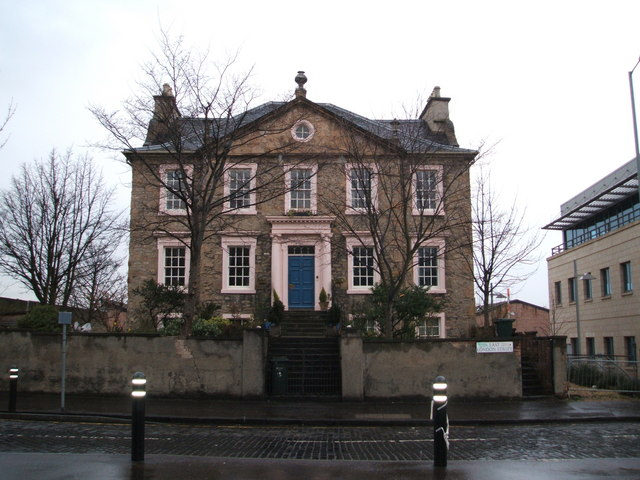
Gayfield House

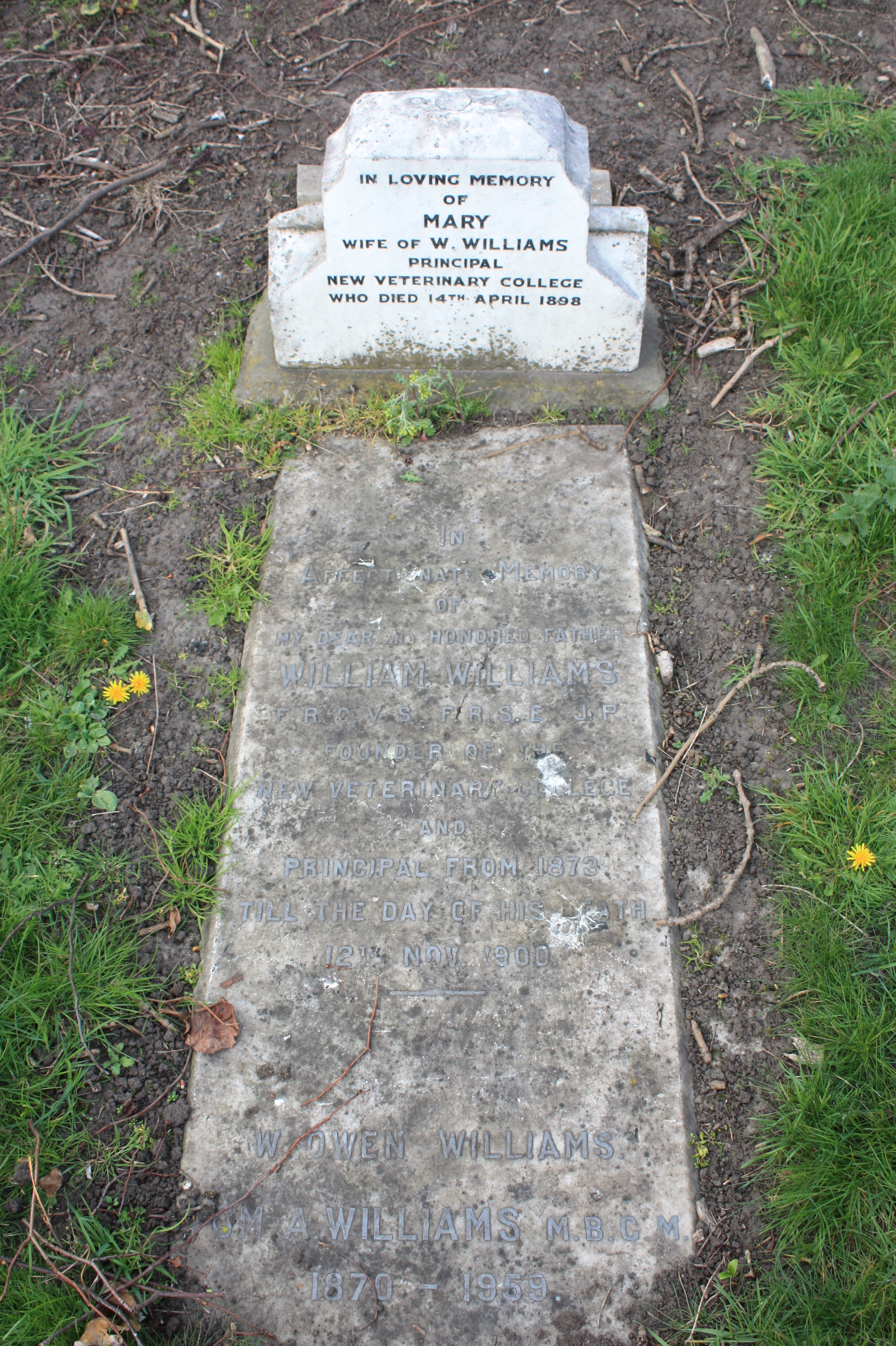
The grave of William Williams, Warriston Cemetery

William Williams FRSE PRCVS (1832–1900) was a Welsh veterinary surgeon who served as principal of the Dick Veterinary College in Edinburgh (1867–73) and as president of the Royal College of Veterinary Surgeons (1879). He was the founder and principal of the rival New Veterinary College (1873–1904), originally housed in Gayfield House, Edinburgh.

He wrote several standard works on veterinary science.

== Life ==
Williams was born in Bontnewydd near St Asaph, north Wales, in 1832. He was the son of William Williams and grandson of Thomas Williams, both renowned farriers. He followed in their profession but had a breakdown in health in 1852 and spent three years in Australia before returning to Britain.

He enrolled in the new Dick Veterinary College in Edinburgh under William Dick in 1855. He qualified MRCVS in 1857, and set up a veterinary practice in Bradford, Yorkshire, England. In 1867 he returned to his alma mater in Edinburgh to become third principal of the Dick Veterinary College, replacing the brief principalship of Colonel James H. B. Hallen FRSE who was urgently called to India to address an outbreak of cattle plague.

Walter George Burnett Dickinson FRSE was amongst his many students.

In 1868 Williams was elected a Fellow of the Royal Society of Edinburgh his proposer being Sir William Turner.

In January 1869 he and fellow veterinary professor Allen Dalzell were sued in the Scottish Court of session by a former colleague, John Adam McBride, leading to a great deal of ill-will in the college. A lot of the ill-will focussed upon Mary Dick, William Dick's sister, who held a high degree of control over the college after her brother's death.

In 1873 Williams founded the New Veterinary College in Edinburgh, in direct competition to William Dick's College. The new college was housed in Gayfield House on East London Street. His staff included Dr Stevenson Macadam. In 1883, due to growing success, the college commissioned William Hamilton Beattie to design a purpose-built building on the east side of Elm Row, at the head of Leith Walk where it remained until closure in 1904. The building, later also serving as a BBC Scotland studio, is now converted into student housing.

Williams died on 12 November 1900, at 1 Crawford Place, Edinburgh. He was interred at Warriston Cemetery. His white marble stone is flat to the ground and disappearing from view. It lies on the upper section of the vaults to the west side.

== Family ==
Williams married Caroline Owen. Her death in 1867 affected Williams greatly. Their son William Owen Williams FRSE (1860–1911) was also a veterinarian and worked with his father at the Elm Row college. Following his father's death the college lost momentum and in 1904 William Owen Williams moved to Liverpool to set up a new veterinary college, being officially Professor of Veterinary Medicine and Surgery at Liverpool University.

== Artistic recognition ==
A contemporary oil portrait of Williams by John Dick Bowie is held by the Royal College of Veterinary Surgeons.

Williams was one of twenty "shadow portraits" created in 2005 of the various Dick Vet Principals. The portraits were moved from Summerhall to Easter Bush when the old college closed.
