= The Veterinary Journal =

- Discipline: Veterinary
- Language: English
- Edited by: Aduli Enoch Othniel Malau-Aduli

Publication details
- Former names: British Veterinary Journal, The Veterinary Journal and Annals of Comparative Pathology
- History: 1875-present
- Publisher: Elsevier
- Frequency: Monthly
- Open access: Hybrid
- Impact factor: 2.2 (2022)

Standard abbreviations
- ISO 4: Vet. J.

Indexing
- CODEN: VTJRFP
- ISSN: 1090-0233 (print); 1532-2971 (web)
- OCLC no.: 1049807465
- The Veterinary Journal and Annals of Comparative Pathology
- ISSN: 2543-3377
- The Veterinary Journal
- ISSN: 0372-5545
- British Veterinary Journal
- ISSN: 0007-1935

Links
- Journal homepage; Online archive

The Veterinary Journal is a monthly peer-reviewed scientific journal covering veterinary science and related topics. The journal was established in 1875 as The Veterinary Journal and Annals of Comparative Pathology and renamed The Veterinary Journal in 1900, then renamed British Veterinary Journal in 1949 before finally obtaining its current title in 1997. It is published by Elsevier and the editor-in-chief is Aduli Enoch Othniel Malau-Aduli (The University of Newcastle, Australia). The journal publishes research articles, review articles, and case studies.

== Abstracting and indexing ==
The journal is abstracted and indexed in:

- Aquatic Sciences and Fisheries Abstracts
- Biological Abstracts
- BIOSIS Previews
- Current Contents/Agriculture, Biology & Environmental Sciences
- CAB Abstracts
- EBSCO databases
- Index Medicus/MEDLINE/PubMed
- Science Citation Index Expanded
- Scopus

According to the Journal Citation Reports, the journal has a 2022 impact factor of 2.2.
