= William Owen Williams =

William Owen Williams FRSE FRCVS (1860–1911) was a Yorkshire-born veterinarian of Welsh descent.

== Life ==
He was born in Bradford in 1860, the son of William Williams and his wife Caroline Owen. Caroline died in 1867 when young William was only 7 years old.

Following his mother's death he moved with his father to Edinburgh where his father took over the Dick Veterinary College, replacing Col H B Hallen. Young William was educated at the Royal High School in Edinburgh.

He trained as a veterinarian under his father at the original college location in Gayfield House, and also at the national French Veterinary School at Alfort. Then from 1886 worked with his father at the Williams Veterinary College on Elm Row at the top of Leith Walk.

In 1897 he was elected a Fellow of the Royal Society of Edinburgh. His proposers were Sir William Turner, Sir Thomas Richard Fraser, James Geikie and Robert Wallace. At this time he was living at "Johnville" in the Portobello district.

On the death of his father in 1900 he became principal of the college and also inherited his father's blacksmith business on Rose Street. He also became editor of the Veterinary Journal. He left Edinburgh in 1905 to become Professor of Veterinary Medicine and Surgery at Liverpool University following the closure of the Williams College on Leith Walk in 1904.

He died suddenly at his home in New Ferry in Liverpool on 7 November 1911 aged only 50.

== Family ==
In 1885 he married Annie Christine Flint. They appear to have lived with William's father at a large Georgian house at 24 London Street for many years.

== Publications ==
- The Principles and Practice of Veterinary Medicine
