= Michael Findlay =

Mike or Michael Findlay may refer to:

- Michael Findlay (filmmaker) (1937–1977), American producer, director and screenwriter
- Mike Findlay (born 1943), West Indian cricketer
- Michael Findlay (veterinary surgeon) (1944–2014), Scottish author and broadcaster
- Michael Findlay (art expert) (born 1945), Scottish-American art dealer and author
- Michael Findlay (soccer) (born 1963), Canadian soccer coach

== See also ==
- Mike Finley (1950–2020), American writer and videographer
- Michael Finley (born 1973), American basketball player
