= Gösta Peterson =

Swedish-American fashion photographer (1923–2017)

Gösta "Gus" Peterson (né Gösta Reinhold Pettersson, April 25, 1923 – July 28, 2017) was a Swedish-American photographer whose fashion photographs were widely published in the editorial pages of magazines including Elle, Esquire, Essence Harper's Bazaar, Mademoiselle, Marie Claire, and The New York Times, from the late 1950s to the late 1980s. In the 1960s, Bea Feitler, the former Art Director for Harper’s Bazaar, Ms., and Rolling Stone said, "The most interesting fashion pages now – the ones that say the most about our times – are Gösta Peterson’s for Mademoiselle." The photographer Duane Michals called him, "underrated."

== Early life ==
Peterson was born in Örebro, Sweden on April 25, 1923. He moved to Stockholm where he studied illustration and advertising graphics at the Anders Beckman Skola. After graduation, he served in the Swedish military from 1943 to 1944. (Sweden was neutral in World War II, so he did not go to war.) After service, he went to work as an illustrator at Gumaelius Annonsbyrå, the first modern advertising agency in Sweden.

A relative invited him to come to the U.S., and in March 1948, he moved to New York "with poor English," by his own account, "but enough to find every jazz club in town." He got a job as an illustrator at the department store Lord & Taylor. He found himself becoming restless "hanging over a drafting table" all day. He said, "I didn’t want to work with these damn people who scribbled on my drawings. I liked to have control."

When he left Sweden, he was given a Rolleiflex camera as a leaving present from the Gumaelius Annonsbyrå where he was working. Self-taught, he honed his skills as a photographer practicing street photography on the streets of New York and photographing children, his friends and family, and himself.

In the early 1950s, he met his future wife Patricia Evans, née Patricia Ann Louis, who at the time was a fashion associate at Mademoiselle, at a cocktail party in Westhampton, New York. He caught her eye as he was wearing khaki pants and watering flowers at the party. He married her on July 10, 1954. Peterson credits her with helping him jumpstart his career as a photographer. Patricia Peterson frequently collaborated with Gösta Peterson, during her terms as fashion editor of The New York Times from 1957 to 1977 and vice president of the exclusive department store Henri Bendel from 1977 to 1989.

== Photography ==
Gösta Peterson’s work has been described as groundbreaking and pioneering, and has been rated in the same category as Irving Penn and Richard Avedon. He found himself becoming restless "hanging over a drafting table" all day. He would often photograph lavishly dressed models in "mundane, vulgar settings". His work is noted for its staging and composition; he often used humorous or dramatic scenarios to convey the image and pioneered "a more informal, personal approach to fashion photography". He also devised special effects, such as photographing with the shutter open while "drawing" on and around his subject with a strobe light.

Peterson thrived in the atmosphere of freedom prevalent in the 1960s and 1970s, when photographers and art directors were far more experimental. Roger Schoening, Art Director for Mademoiselle from 1961 to 1978, and for Vogue from 1979 to 1988, remarked, "I never send Gus out on a job that I don’t wonder what he’s going to come back with. Is he going to give me fashion pictures or a W.P.A. portfolio?...I can never get a simple fashion picture from him. It always looks like it belongs in an art gallery."

With few exceptions, Peterson insisted on shooting real people with quirks and personality in place of trained fashion models, rejecting an assignment from Alexander Liberman at Vogue who would not grant him that freedom. Peterson said, "I was famous--or notorious--for finding girls who didn't look like fashion models." As he explained, "There’s nothing worse than an over-trained model who’s lost all sense of her body’s personality."

"Gösta Peterson preferred to come to a fashion sitting without any preconceptions . . . . and while many successful young fashion photographers today appear to be indebted to the casual, ‘snapshot’ element of his work, few apply it with his integrity," said Martin Harrison, author of Fashion Photography Since 1945, p. 182 (Rizzoli, 1991).

Gösta Peterson was the first photographer to photograph British model Twiggy in America when she arrived in New York City in April 1967.

In summer 1967, a fledgling African-American model named Naomi Sims telephoned Peterson and made an appointment to visit his studio. She had never been photographed for publication and had previously done only a single test shoot with John Vidol. After a brief meeting, Peterson sent Sims to The New York Times offices to meet his wife, Patricia. On the spot, she booked Sims for a shoot for an upcoming issue of The New York Times for the following Tuesday. Peterson’s photograph of Naomi Sims made the cover of the August 27, 1967 Fashions of the Times, the Sunday supplement to The New York Times. The photo made fashion history for being the first cover of a major fashion magazine with mixed-race readership to feature an identifiably Black model. Peterson launched the careers of other Black models, such as Barbara Summers, and his work was featured in the first issue of Essence.

Apart from his fashion work, he also photographed artists and musicians such as Salvador Dalí, Duke Ellington, and Charles Mingus.

== Career ==
From the 1950s to 1980s, Peterson’s work was featured in and on the cover of magazines, including Elle, Esquire, GQ, Harper's Bazaar, L'Officiel, Mademoiselle, Marie Claire, The New York Times, and Town & Country, among others. He shot the most influential designers of the late 20th century, including Pierre Cardin, Comme des Garçons, Fendi, Rudi Gernreich, Halston, Ralph Lauren, Pucci, Sonia Rykiel, and Yves Saint Laurent.

In 1977, after his wife Patricia became vice president at the exclusive department store Henri Bendel, Bendel’s changed its advertising from illustrations to 11 x 13-inch, half-page advertorials using his photographs. Working for Henri Bendel, he produced a new set of photographs weekly: doing the session on Thursday, with the photographs ready the following day and published in the Sunday edition of The New York Times a couple of days later. Patricia said of their collaboration on the Bendel’s ads, "Gus is very easy to work with, and our roles are clearly defined. I figure out the space with the Times, handle the clothes and styling, and make sure everything gets to the studio with the models. The rest is up to Gus. No one else looks into the camera or directs the models."

Peterson’s studio was located at 200 East 87th Street, 3rd Floor, New York, NY.

Peterson’s assistants included:

• Josef Astor

• Deborah Bell

• Arthur Elgort (four months, around 1966): Peterson's use of natural light in turn influenced Elgort's work. Elgort told the art historian Martin Harrison, "He was great; improvisational, off-the-cuff."

• Linda Rodin (three years in the 1970s): Fashion and beauty entrepreneur and model. "He seemed to shoot everything I loved in all of the magazines," she explained. "So I got his address from the phonebook and went up there and sat on his stoop for like 2 hours."

• Roberto Sandoval

• Deborah Tuberville

• Stan Wan

Peterson retired in 1986.

== Exhibitions and collections ==
• April 13-June 29, 2023: Gösta Peterson Photographs 1960s-1970s, Deborah Bell Photographs, New York City (solo exhibition)

• October 8, 2022 – February 12, 2023: A Personal View of High Fashion & Street Style, Photographs from the Nicola Erni Collection 1930s to Now, Norton Museum of Art, West Palm Beach, Florida (group exhibition)

• In January 2015: From The Archive, Turn Gallery, New York City (solo exhibition)

• May 6-August 9, 2009: The Model as Muse: Embodying Fashion, The Costume Institute of The Metropolitan Museum of Art, New York City (group exhibition)

• March–April 2008: Presumed Innocence: Photographic Perspectives of Children, DeCordova Museum, Lincoln, Massachusetts (group exhibition)

• October 18-November 30, 1986: Dagsländor, Fotografiska Museet i Moderna Museet, Stockholm, Sweden (solo exhibition)

Peterson's photographs are held in museum collections worldwide, including the Detroit Institute of Arts, Detroit; Museum of Fine Arts, Boston; Victoria & Albert Museum, London; Worcester Art Museum, Worcester, MA; and private collections such as The James Moores Collection, Liverpool, England (formerly Pulsynetic, London).

== Awards ==
Gösta Peterson is the recipient of multiple awards, including:

• 1963: 42nd Annual National Exhibition of Advertising and Editorial Art and Design of the New York Art Directors Club

• 1979: The Art Directors Club 58th Annual Exhibition Merit Awards for his photographs for Ralph Lauren and Chloe

• 1980: The Art Directors Club 58th Annual Exhibition Merit Awards for his photographs for "Fox"

• 1981: Award of Excellence CA-81, 22nd Annual Exhibition Sponsored by Communication Arts Magazine -- Consumer Magazine Ad Campaign (Ruth Scharf, client / DBA Group Two, agency)

• 1982: The Certificate of Excellence for the exhibition Communication Graphics 1982 Awarded by the American Institute of Graphic Arts

• 1983: Award of Excellence CA-83, 24th Annual Exhibition Sponsored by Communication Arts Magazine -- Consumer Magazine Ad Campaign (AT&T Communications, client / NW Ayer Inc., agency)

== Personal life ==
Gösta and Patricia Peterson have a daughter Annika Peterson, the owner of Turn Gallery and an actor and a son Jan Krister Peterson, a director and cinematographer who is married to the photographer Enid Crow.

Peterson was a fan of jazz, and he played the trombone as a hobby. He was friends with jazz composer/musician Charles Mingus and shot the cover of the album Mingus at Carnegie Hall. He also photographed musicians Yo Yo Ma, Zoot Sims, and Duke Ellington.
