= Otis Bigelow =

Otis Munro Bigelow
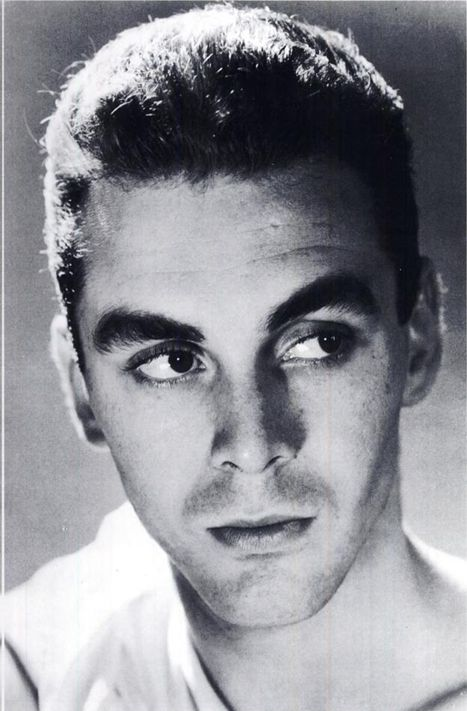
- Born: June 2, 1920; Exeter, New Hampshire, U.S.
- Died: October 6, 2007 (aged 87); New York City, New York, U.S.
- Occupations: Actor; playwright; stage manager

Otis Munro Bigelow III (June 2, 1920 - October 6, 2007) was a Broadway actor, playwright, and stage manager. He was one of the best-looking men in Manhattan in the 1940s, and one of the first partners of Christian William Miller.

== Early life ==
Otis Munro Bigelow III was born on June 2, 1920, in Exeter, New Hampshire. He was the only child of Otis Munro Bigelow II (1881-1932), professor of Romance languages at Phillips Exeter Academy, and Ruth Lillian Spalding (1885-1937). His grandfather, Otis Munro Bigelow I (d. 1939) was the president of the Baldwinsville State Bank.

He attended Rumsey Hall School, in Washington, Connecticut, where he had his first sexual experiences with classmates. In 1934 he transferred to Phillips Exeter Academy, where he was the lead actor in theatrical productions at the Old Farragut Playhouse, Rye Beach, New Hampshire. One newspaper said: "Otis Bigelow as "Corey Masters" did a very fine job and should be mentioned as one of the outstanding members of the cast." After high school he lost his father and his uncle Robert W. Keyes of Utica, New York, who had married his aunt, Olivia Bigelow Keyes (1894-1982), became his guardian. He entered Hamilton College in 1939 joining the Naval Reserve Officer Training. At Hamilton College, Bigelow had lead roles in the Charlatans productions and was managing editor of The Continental (a student-run magazine) and co-editor of Hamiltonews. He was a member of the Publications Board and of Pi Delta Epsilon, a journalism fraternity. He was part of the Theta Delta Chi fraternity. He sang in the College Choir and fenced for the Coach Glas. When he graduated in 1943, The Hamiltonian said that he was "the seniors' most diversified artist."

== Career ==
At the beginning of his career, he acted and danced on Broadway. He later became a playwright and theatrical agent.

In 1941 he was writing songs, like "Seems Like Yesterday".

While he was at Hamilton College, Bigelow wrote a play that John C. Wilson optioned for Broadway, and in 1942, he asked Bigelow to come back to Broadway and rewrite it.

He was a reservist for the U.S. Navy and served during World War II as an officer aboard minesweepers in both the Atlantic and the Pacific. After two years of active duty, he was released in 1945 as a lieutenant.

He was in the cast of Red Letter, a hit in London, made his debut on Broadway as the sailor in Dear Ruth. In 1945 he was in the cast of Fifty-fifty by Andrew Rosenthal at the Sayville Playhouse, Sayville, New York, starring Margaret Bannerman.

In 1947 he made an audition at Warner Brothers in Hollywood, but was signed as screenwriter. He collaborated with Robert Richards for One Sunday Afternoon starring Dennis Morgan.

In 1948, he went to Paris "to get my mind straightened after Hollywood", and took odd jobs in French movies, including acting as well as translating and devising English subtitles. He appeared in films with Danielle Darrieux, Jean Pierre Aumont and Gene Kelly. In 1949 he was in the cast of Peg O' My Heart, starring Academy Award winner Peggy Ann Garner with the Chevy Chase Summer Theater in Wheeling, Illinois; a newspaper said: "The talented resident company, Paula Laurence, Martin Kingsley, Will Kuluva and Otis Bigelow, again will be turning in the excellent performances that marked last week's comedy starring Buster Keaton." The Tower Ticker column in the Chicago Tribune reported on July 25, 1949, that "Bobbysoxers treeked out to the Chevy Chase summer theater to get Peggy Ann Garner's autograf but stayed to mob Chicago juvenile Otis Bigelow."

Back to New York City, he concentrated on writing, but was not able to support himself. To Dorothy, a Son, by Roger MacDougal in collaboration with Bigelow, was a success for more than one year in London, directed by Herman Shumlin and was brought to Broadway in 1952. Starring was Ronald Howard, the son of Leslie Howard.

Bigelow took ballet lessons and became a dancer in for The King and I on Broadway for three years; he was the Siamese slave and remained with the production for two years.

In 1953, he joined the dance group Musical Americana, made of 20 men and women, and went on a tour which covered 33 states and 25,000 miles in four months. He then spent a summer with the José Limón Company. In 1955 he then joined the cast of The Teahouse of the August Moon, produced by Maurice Evans (he was the young Okinawa suitor of the geisha girl) and in 1957 of Auntie Mame, starring Connie Bennett (he was the school teacher).

In 1957, he played the role of a set designer in the movie Designing Woman by Vincente Minnelli with Gregory Peck and Lauren Bacall.

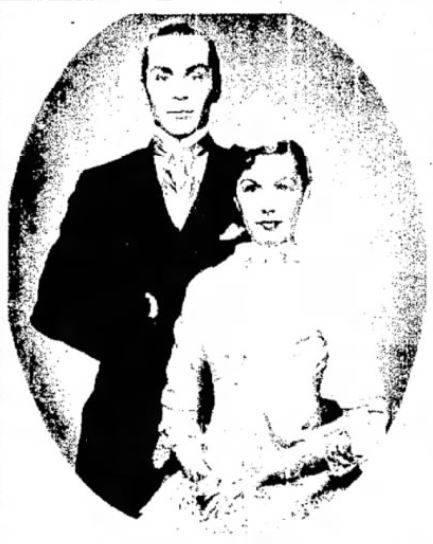
Otis Bigelow and Kay Coulter in the Drunkard

In the late 1950s, he was resident company lead for the Cherry County Playhouse in Traverse City, Michigan:

- In June 1959, he played the lead role in The Drunkard "one of the most played favorites in the show business history".
- In July 1959, he was in the cast of The Happy Time, starring Greta Thyssen; a newspaper said: "Kay Coulter and Otis Bigelow were wonderful as the parents."
- In July 1959, he was Max Hollyday in the cast of Dial M for Murder.
- In July 1959, he was Wesley Cartwright, lead role in the cast of "Post Road", starring ZaSu Pitts. Of Bigelow they said "The most was gotten out of a difficult role by Otis Bigelow, a very versatile actor."

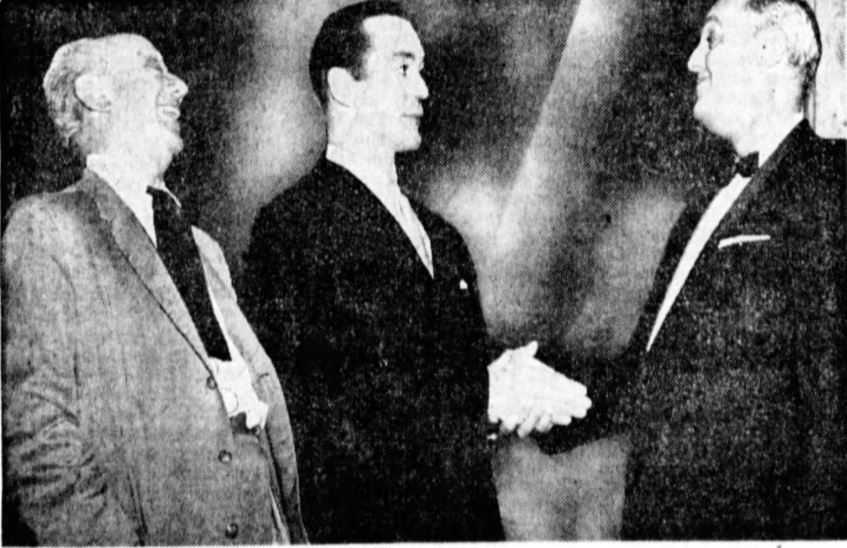
Mason Wright, Otis Bigelow, David C. Jones in 1959, part of the cast of "Yes Man"

- In August 1959, he was Newman in the cast of Yes Man, starring Jack Barry, a TV personality; about Bigelow, a newspaper said "they can search high and low, on Broadway or down alleys, but they'll never find a man who can do a better job of playing the robot part than Otis Bigelow. Absolutely fascinating."
- In August 1959, he was Tom MacKenzie in the cast of Seven Year Itch, starring Gene Raymond, popular stage, screen and television actor.
- In June 1960, he was in the cast of The Curious Savage by John Patrick, starring ZaSu Pitts. A newspaper said: "As the widow's daughter and sons, Suzanne Kaaren, Otis Bigelow, and Jim MacRoslie create a wonderfully unappetizing trio of characters."
- In August 1960, he was Harry King, the father of the lead, in the cast of Belvedere, starring veteran star of movie and TV Charlie Ruggles.
- In August 1960, he was Morris Dixon in the cast of Noël Coward's Present Laughter, starring Reginald Gardiner, movie and stage star.
- In August 1960, he was Orlov in the cast of Who Was That Lady I Saw You With, starring Julius LaRosa, again a TV personality.
- In August 1960, he was Bradford in the cast of Ballots Up, starring Marvin Miller, TV and radio personality.
- In August 1960, he was Jackson Eldredge in the cast of The Golden Fleecing, starring Eddie Bracken.

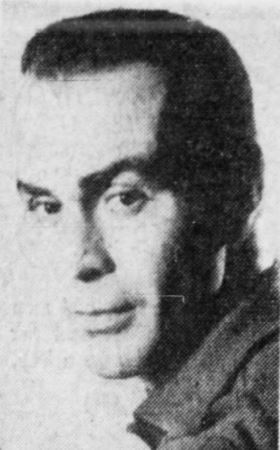
Otis Bigelow in 1961

In 1960, he appeared in the San Juan Drama Festival in Puerto Rico. In June 1961, he had the lead role in Marriage-Go-Round with the Gretna Playhouse, in Lebanon, Pennsylvania. He was then Hogan in Under the Yum Yum Tree. Later in the month, he was in the cast of Make a Million; a newspaper said: "He moves like a dancer with purpose and grace does Otis Bigelow who has leading roles at the Gretna Play." And in July 1961, he was in the cast of Plain Betsy. In late 1961, he was in the Broadway production A Cook for Mr. General. In June 1962, he was back with the Gretna Play for Everybody Loves Opal starring Kay MacDonald, and the week after, he was in the cast of "Write Me a Murder", starring Leonard Frey and Joseph Masiell. In 1965, he was in the cast of Never Too Late with Maureen O'Sullivan and Arthur Godfrey, produced on Broadway and then Palm Beach, Florida.

Later in life he moved to stage management for off-Broadway and summer tour productions. He worked for Mart Crowley's The Boys in the Band (1968) and for the Williamstown Theatre Festival and the Bucks County Playhouse. He was also a professor at Dartmouth College.

He retired in 1984.

== Written plays ==
- My Fair Lady performed:
  - in 1947 at Broadway and in Bridgeport, Connecticut, starring Alexander Kirkland.
- The Marriner Method performed:
  - in 1957 at Broadway, produced by Maurice Evans
  - in 1958 in London and New York City, produced by Robert Morley and Robin Fox and in association with David Merrick in New York, starring Morley and Margaret Rutherford
- The Peacock Season performed:
  - in 1960 in Jones Beach, New York, directed by Jose Ferrer
  - in 1961 at Broadway, starring George Grizzard
  - in 1971 in Los Angeles, California.
  - in 1972 in Chicago, Illinois, directed by Tony Randall
  - in 1972 (till 1974) in St. Louis, Missouri
  - in January 1975 in Stonington, Connecticut
  - in December 1975 (and again in 1985) in Marshfield, Wisconsin
  - in 1981 in Charlotte, North Carolina
  - in 1983 in Columbus, Nebraska
  - in 1991 in Santa Clarita, California
- The Giant's Dance performed:
  - in 1964 in New York City at the Cherry Lane Theater, produced by Richard Barr and Clinton Wilder
  - in 1967 in Pocatello, Idaho
  - in June 1968 in Indianapolis, Indiana.
  - in December 1968 in North Hollywood, California
  - in February 1970 in Beckley, West Virginia
  - in 1970 in Fairbanks, Alaska
  - in 1970 (till 1976) in Orlando, Florida, starring Dale Carpenter
  - in 1972 in Los Angeles, California, starring Bennye Gatteys
  - in 1974 in Nashville, Tennessee
  - in 1977 in Columbus, Nebraska
  - in January 1978 in Asbury Park, New Jersey.
  - in April 1978 in Philadelphia, Pennsylvania
  - in October 1981 in Great Falls, Montana
  - in November 1981 in Antioch, Illinois
  - in 1983 in Wilmington, Delaware
  - in 1994 in Clute, Texas
  - in 1997 in Saugus, California
- A.M. performed:
  - in 1965 in Westport, Connecticut, starring Leonard Frey and Alice Drummond
  - in 1973 in Los Angeles, California
- The Morning After performed:
  - in 1968 in Manchester, Vermont
- The Prevalence of Mrs. Seal performed:
  - in 1974 in Foster City, California
  - in 1977 at Lexington Conservatory Theatre in Lexington, NY. Directed by the author, who dedicated the published play to the artistic director.
  - in 1982 in Green Bay, Wisconsin
  - in 1997 in Saugus, California
  - in 2005 in Jackson, Tennessee
- The Unicorns performed:
  - in 1978 at Lexington Conservatory Theatre in Lexington, New York
- An Evening with a Great Lady of the Silver Screen
  - in 1976 at Lexington Conservatory Theatre in Lexington, NY

== Personal life ==
While acting in a summer production in Rye Beach, New Hampshire, Bigelow met Gordon Merrick. They shared an apartment in New York on East 54th Street, and Richard Barr joined them. When Merrick wrote his gay romance The Lord Won't Mind, he modeled one of the characters after Bigelow.

In New York City in the 1940s, Bigelow became a prominent figure in the gay society. He was interviewed by Alfred Kinsey for his research on sexual behavior. He was in a relationship with millionaire George Gallowhur, but he left Gallowhur when he fell in love with Bill Miller.

He was friends with Maury Paul, the original Cholly Knickerbocker who wrote a society columnist for Hearst.

After retirement, Bigelow resided in New York City with Thierry Mahe, his long-term partner of more than 50 years. He had a summer house on Fire Island, New York and traveled often to France. He collected Art Nouveau glass and fin-de-sicle posters.

He died on October 6, 2007, in New York City.
