= Christian William Miller =

American artist and model

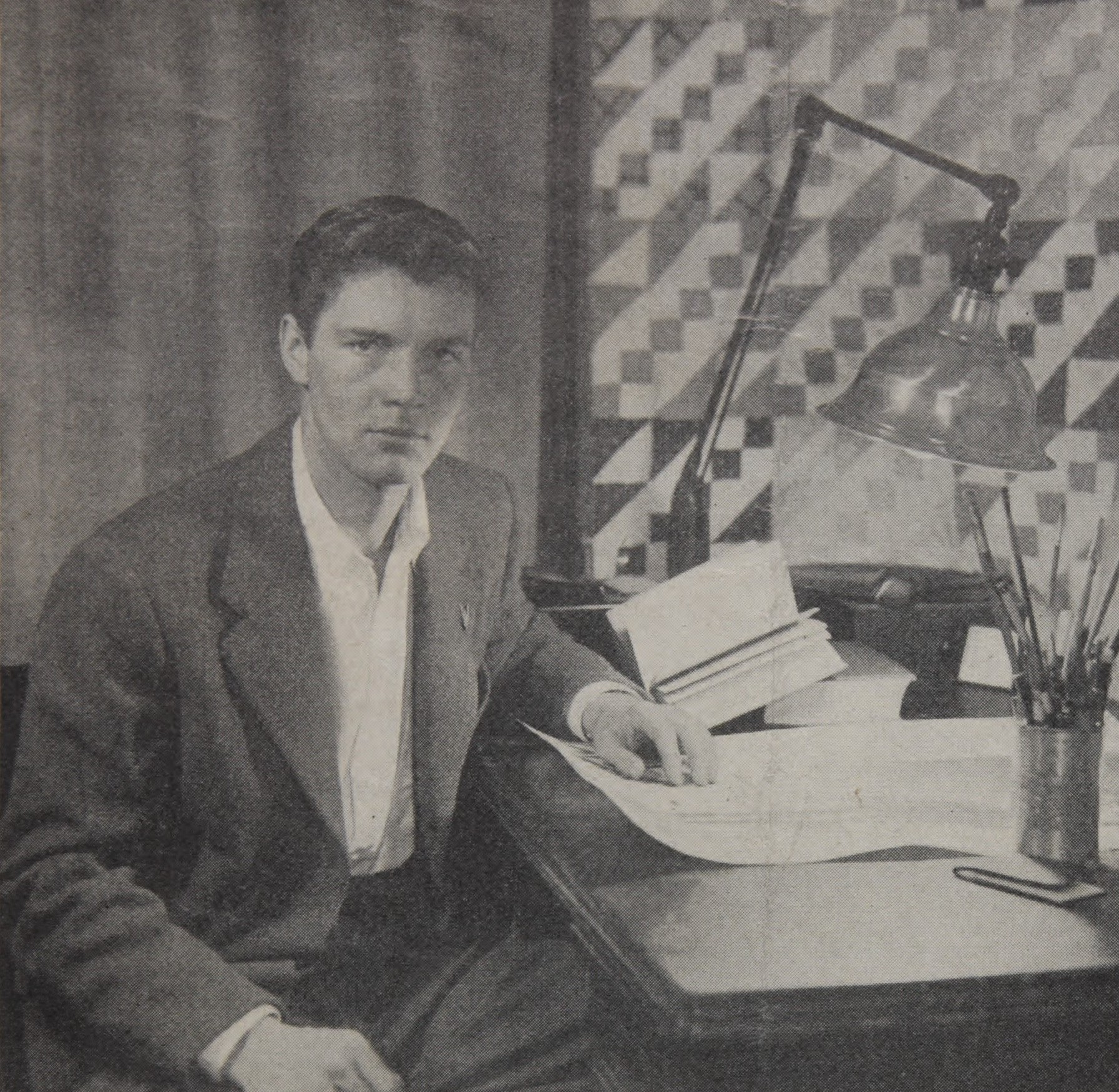
Bill Miller, Dartmouth Alumni Magazine, 1946

Christian William Miller (born William Henry Miller; August 7, 1921 – July 5, 1995) was an American artist and model who contemporaries qualified as "one of the most beautiful men" in the gay social scene of New York City in the 1940s.

== Early life and education ==
William Henry Miller (in 1951 legally changed to Christian William Miller) was born in South Orange, New Jersey, on August 7, 1921.

From 1938 to 1941 Miller attended the Franklin School of Professional Arts in New York City, obtaining an advertising design major. After his military career Miller attended The New School for Social Research, from 1947 to 1949, in New York City. In 1949 he enrolled at Dartmouth College, taking up liberal art studies. Also in 1949, Miller was awarded a Fulbright scholarship; an American scholarship program of competitive, merit-based grants. The scholarship lasted till 1951.

== Career ==
From 1939 to 1941, while still a student at the School of Professional Arts, Miller worked as a designer for Datzenbach & Warren, Brunschwig & Fils, and the oldest luxury department store in the United States, Lord & Taylor. He designed fabrics, wallpaper, stage sets for summer theatres as well as freelance advertising and arranging window displays.

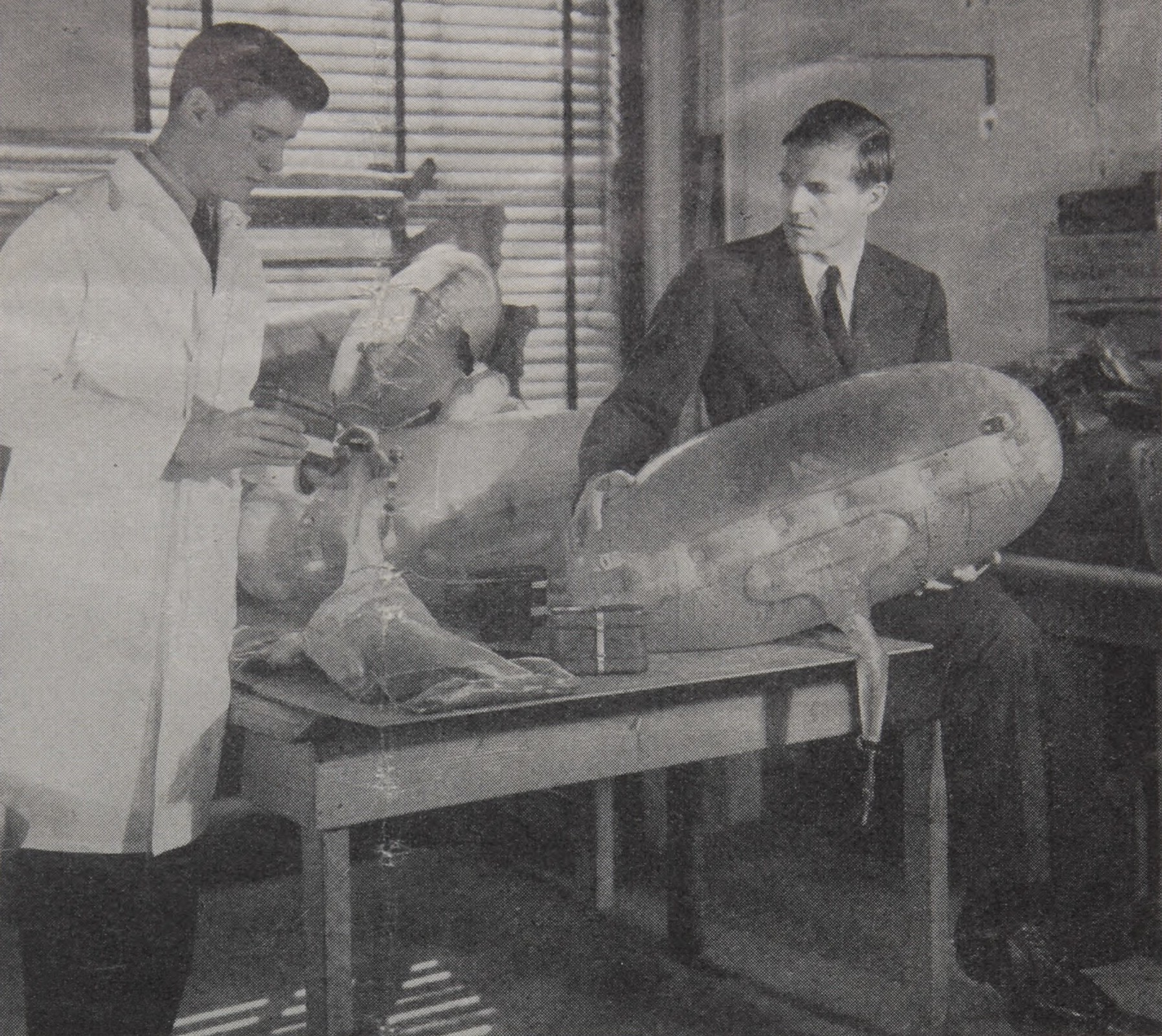
Bill Miller and George Gallowhur with Sunstill

Miller enlisted in June 1942 in the United States Coast Guard and trained with the USS Berkshire County (LST-288). He was stationed at the Brooklyn Navy Yard, serving until 1946. While following the SKAT Insect Repellent project (a malaria control project) in 1942 in Perth, Western Australia, Miller was assigned to a research project with Richard Delano, a cousin of Franklin D. Roosevelt, promoted by the Air-Sea Agency, to design a pocket-sized balloon-like water desalination device to be used by Navy and Army fliers, named Sunstill. Franklin D. Roosevelt displayed a model of Sunstill on his desk and Winston Churchill had one with him in his briefcase. The first Model A was in production in the summer of 1943.

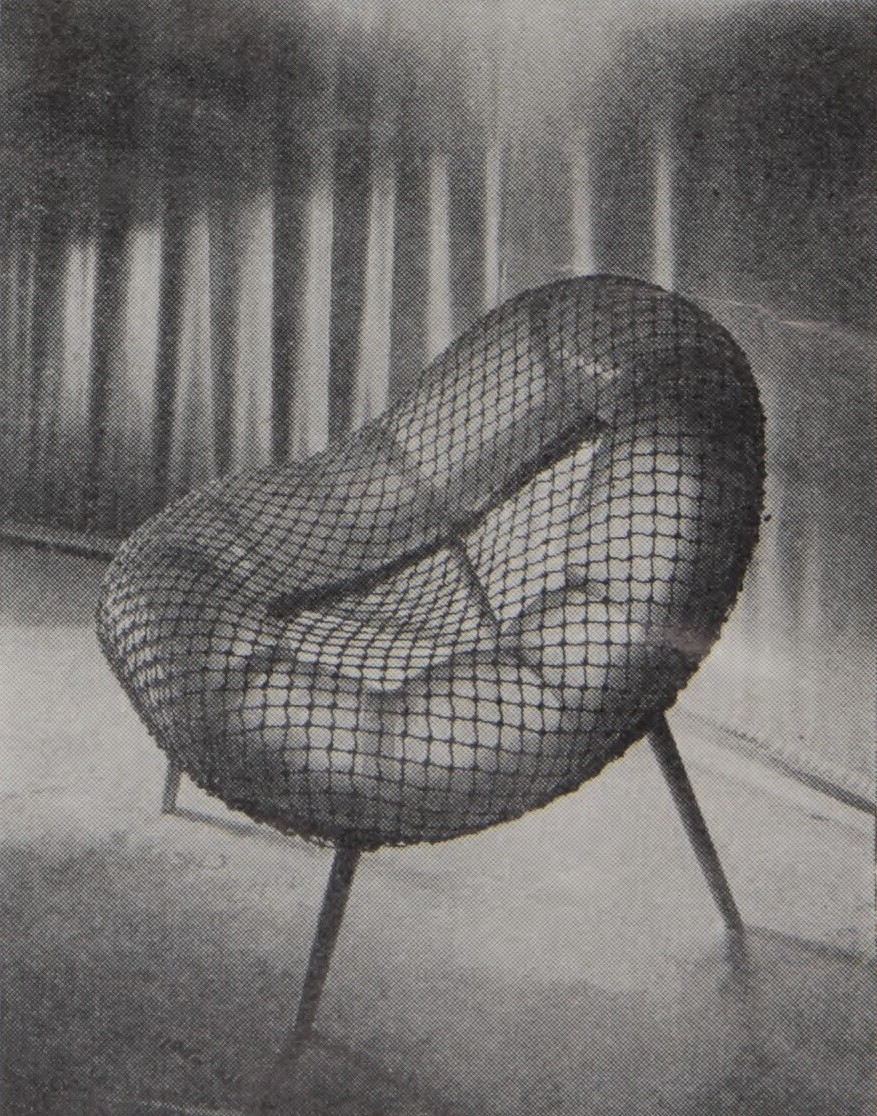
Miller's Chair

While enlisted, Miller worked in a plastic laboratory, where he developed several plastic products:

- a lightweight plastic hat-sunshade developed for the Quartermaster Corps (United States Army)
- a kayak-type plastic inflated boat, weighing only a few pounds and folding into a small suitcase
- an inflatable plastic chair, both comfortable and sturdy, which collapsed to the size of a briefcase, designed for travellers; it is now in the permanent collection at the Department of Architecture and Design, Museum of Modern Art. In 1944 Time defined it "a chair whose fish-net seat (draped over a pneumatic, plastic doughnut) was surrealistically adapted to the most unsurrealistic sitter".

All these objects were exhibited at MoMA from May 24 to October 22, 1944, for its 15th-anniversary show, "Art in Progress". The chair was again exhibited at the MoMa from May 6, 2009, to January 10, 2011, in the show "What Was Good Design? MoMA's Message 1944–56".

Also a photographer, Miller documented his travels around the world and social life.

== Gay social scene ==
Miller was a model, acquaintance and/or companion of many luminaries of the gay social scene of New York City in the 1940s: W. H. Auden, Paul Cadmus, Jean Cocteau, Noël Coward, George Cukor, Jean Genet, George Gallowhur, George Hoyningen-Huene, Christopher Isherwood, Alfred Kinsey (of whom he was a lover), Lincoln Kirstein, Dorothy Parker, Bernard Perlin ("Bill Miller was ga-ga-gorgeous"), George Platt Lynes (of whom he was a lover), Ralph Pomeroy ("Bill would go to a gallery and all the women and all the men would faint!"), W. Somerset Maugham, Jonathan Tichenor, Tom Tryon, Gore Vidal, Sam Wagstaff, Glenway Wescott and Monroe Wheeler (of whom he was a lover), Philip Wheelwright.

At one time, Miller was in a relationship with Otis Bigelow. Before meeting Miller, Bigelow was in a relationship with a businessman, George Gallowhur, president of Skol Company; Bigelow left Gallowhur but he had to go back to college, at the Naval Reserve Officers Training Corps program at Hamilton: while Bigelow was there, Miller started a relationship with Gallowhur. Miller's chair and Sunstill were manufactured by Gallowhur Chemical Corp.

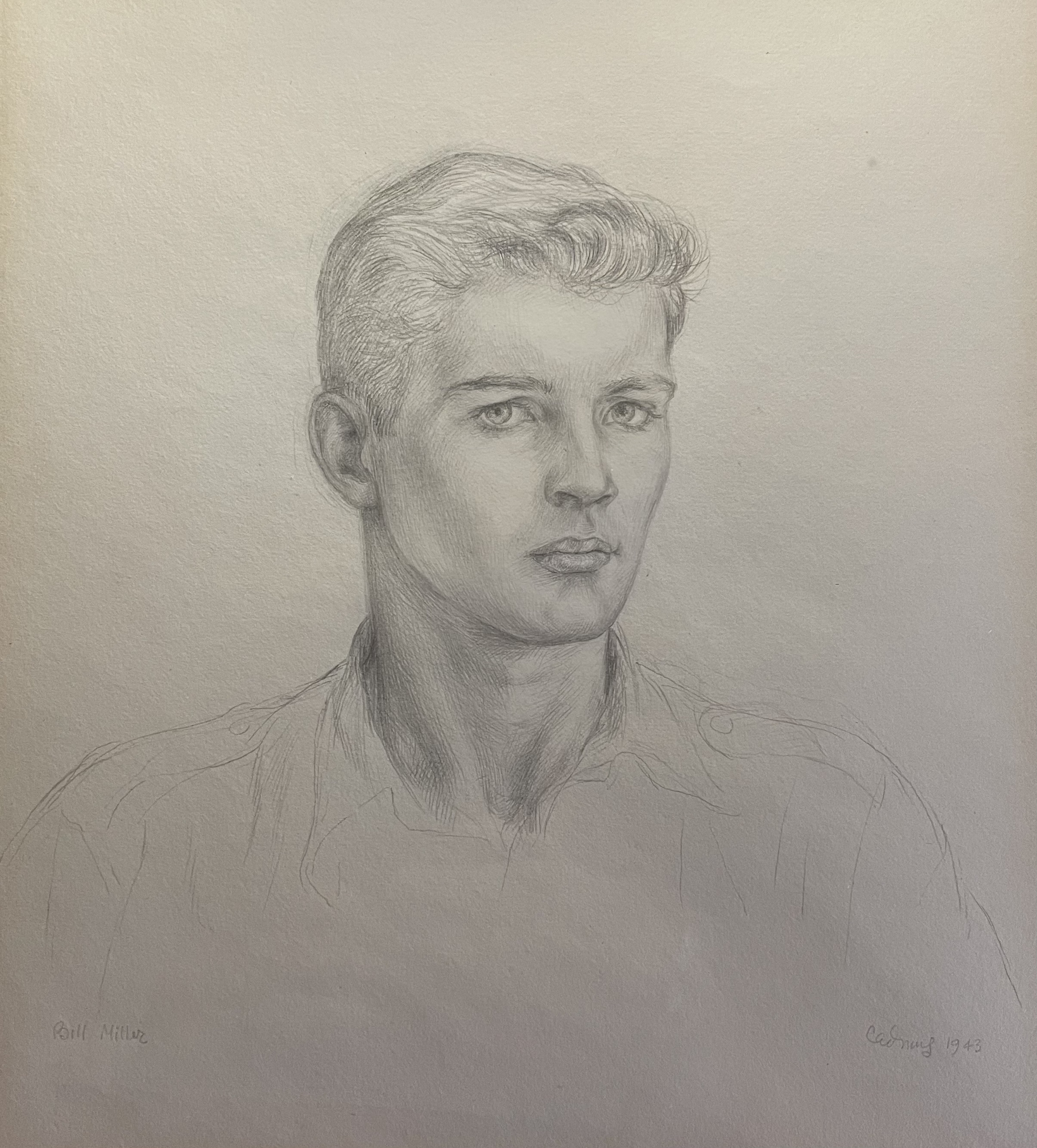
Portrait of Bill Miller by Paul Cadmus

A group of three portraits of Miller by George Platt Lynes made from 1942 to 1946 went on sale at Sotheby's in 1982. In 1945 Miller and Platt Lynes, at the time lovers, went together to a masquerade ball hosted in Weston by Alice DeLamar; their costumes resemble the Commedia dell'Arte and Platt Lynes subsequently took a series of photographs of the two of them dressed in those costumes.

A portrait drawing of Miller done in pencil on ivory paper by Paul Cadmus is inscribed "Bill Miller" at lower left and signed "Cadmus 1943" in lower right. In 1968 it was in the possession of Miller. The portrait was purchased from a San Diego art dealer in April 2017 and is part of a private collection located in southeastern Pennsylvania.

At the end of the 1940s, Christian William Miller, together with Charles "Chuck" Howard (another model who would later become a fashion designer), participated in the "on the field" research of Alfred Kinsey. They went to Bloomington and performed together for Kinsey. Miller's purpose was to "achieve greater social tolerance of homosexuality" (Wilf). Later Miller had a brief relationship with Kinsey.

In 1952 Miller appeared in a photo shoot for Life.

At a party hosted by John B. L. Goodwin in 1955, Bill Miller is listed by Christopher Isherwood among other guests, including Paul Cadmus, Tennessee Williams and Frank Merlo.

== Personal life and death ==
With the savings from his military career, Bill Miller bought a house in Reading, Vermont, that he restored and redecorated. Later in life he owned a cottage at Saint Croix, U.S. Virgin Islands.

Miller died on July 5, 1995.
