= Patricia Peterson =

American fashion editor (1926–2025)

- Born: Patricia Ann Louis; June 6, 1926; Chicago, Illinois, U.S.
- Died: June 15, 2025 (aged 99); New York City, U.S.
- Other name: Pat Evans
- Occupations: Fashion editor Vice President, Henri Bendel
- Spouse: Gösta Peterson (m. 1954; died 2017)
- Children: Jan Peterson; Annika Peterson
- Relatives: Melissa Shook (cousin)

Patricia Ann Peterson (née Louis, June 6, 1926 – June 15, 2025) was an American journalist who was the fashion editor for The New York Times from 1957 to 1977 and Vice President of Advertising, Fashion and Promotion for Henri Bendel, a women's department store in New York City from 1977 to 1989.

== Life and career ==
Patricia Ann Louis was born on June 6, 1926, in Chicago, Illinois. She was educated at Northwestern University, graduating in 1948.

Louis began her career in fashion as the fashion editor of the Purple Parrot, the Northwestern student newspaper, in 1946. After graduating from Northwestern University in June 1948, she worked for Marshall Fields in Chicago in fashion merchandising. In 1950, she moved to New York City and soon after, her friend fashion editor Nonnie Moore suggested Peterson join the staff of Mademoiselle. In 1953, she was listed in the Mademoiselle masthead as a fashion associate under the name Pat Evans. She rose to become Mademoiselle's fashion and merchandise editor.

After a previous marriage ended in divorce, she married Gösta Peterson in 1954.

=== The New York Times ===
Dorothy (Hawkins) Le Sueur brought Peterson to The New York Times in December 1956 to serve as assistant fashion editor as part of the Food, Fashions, Family, Furnishings section. Peterson was named fashion editor when Hawkins resigned as fashion editor in April 1957. Upon her appointment, Times Talk, The New York Times employee newsletter, announced, "Mrs. Peterson now heads a department of twelve women. She supervises and directs the shooting of the more than 1,000 fashion pictures the department takes each year for the daily and Sunday papers and for special fashion sections. She is responsible, too, for coverage of the wholesale market, retail stores, and all other sources of fashion news." As fashion editor, Peterson was responsible for reporting on the European fashion collections in France, London, and Italy and covered important designers like Coco Chanel, Yves Saint Laurent, and others. Of her meeting with Mlle Chanel in 1958, Peterson wrote:

At 75 years of age she is still a stunning woman whose swift instincts about fashion never have been dimmed or repressed. Her eyes, black as bits of coal, and her long, strong hands are never still. She is a woman whose creativity is directed toward one point of view. Her drive is endless and, because of this, her clothes have spanned two generations and will continue to influence those of the future. This is the essenge of the ageless Chanel.

Peterson changed the way fashion trends were documented in The New York Times. Instead of using the paper's news photographers, she introduced a wave of top-notch fashion photographers and artists to The New York Times including Diane Arbus, Cecil Beaton, Guy Bourdin, Gleb Derujinsky, Louis Faurer, Hiro (Yasuhiro Wakabayashi), Saul Leiter, Duane Michals, Tom Palumbo, Gösta Peterson (her own future husband), Francesco Scavullo, and Melvin Sokolsky. She also frequently used Andy Warhol for illustrations in the late 1950s and early 1960s.

While at The New York Times, Patricia Peterson and Gösta Peterson frequently collaborated with each other. Their son, Jan Peterson, appeared in several of Peterson's articles about children's fashion. The couple was responsible for the first major U.S. fashion magazine cover with mixed-race readership to feature an identifiably Black model, Naomi Sims, which was published in the August 27, 1967 edition of Fashions of the Times, The New York Times Magazine. Peterson recruited Andrea "Andy" Skinner from Mademoiselle to work on children's fashions; Skinner and Peterson diversified the race of children photographed in the fashion section. Carrie Donovan and Bernadine Morris worked as fashion reporters during Peterson's tenure as fashion editor.

Marylin Bender wrote, "Patricia Peterson loved fashion but formed no entangling alliances within the industry. She was one of the first fashion editors to grasp the portent of Courrèges." While at the Times, she frequently argued with Charlotte Curtis, editor of "Women's News." According to an interview, Curtis said, "When are you going to get real clothes for real women, Pat?" Pat replied, "I told her I wasn't here to work as a consumer service, but to show what's happening in fashion, to report news."

According to a letter from Diane Arbus to Allan Arbus, in January 1970, Peterson wished to use Arbus's photo of a black girl and a white boy holding hands for the March 15, 1970, cover of the Children's Fashion section of the New York Times Magazine:

The [New York] Times pics were rather lousy and there was a bit of trouble, Pat said it was because the cover photo was of a black girl and a white boy about 4 years old, holding hands. Pat has been incredibly sweet. They wanted a retake which I think she has effectively blocked. . . I am pretty calm about the whole thing. She was full of appreciation for the most minor virtues of the photos. And believe me they were minor. . . and as for the miscegenation, junior style, it may end up being regarded as a major civil rights breakthrough, if they finally let it pass.

The New York Times ultimately featured a photograph of a white girl with her arm draped around a white boy's shoulder instead of the cover Peterson had fought for. The photograph Arbus described of black and white children holding hands does not appear at all.

Peterson was fashion editor during the time that pants were becoming acceptable for women to wear in the United States, and several of The New York Times articles during her tenure debated the wearing of pants. Her crisp writing found its way into multiple dictionary definitions. In a 1965 article about French designers including Guy Laroche, she wrote, "Hems, cuffs, collars and jackets often dripped with fringe," which was later used in the definition of the word "drip" in The World Book Dictionary. In 1976, Peterson wrote, "Colors are clean whites, creamy ivories, port. naturals, rich earth tones and crisp brights," which was later used in the definition of the word "bright" in Merriam Webster's Collegiate Dictionary. The Second Barnhart Dictionary of New English uses Peterson's quotes in the definitions of "clam diggers" and "unconstructed."

=== Henri Bendel ===
In 1977, Geraldine Stutz recruited Patricia Peterson to work for Henri Bendel, where Peterson worked as vice president in charge of Advertising, Fashion and Promotion until her retirement in 1989. During her tenure, Peterson invited guest artists, such as Edward Gorey and Candy Pratts, to create Bendel's famous window displays. She and her husband, Gösta Peterson, created a weekly ad campaign for Bendel's that ran as a half-page in The New York Times each Sunday. Of her partnership with her husband on the Bendel's ad campaign, she said, "Gus is very easy to work with, and our roles are clearly defined. I figure out the space with the Times, handle the clothes and styling, and make sure everything gets to the studio with the models. The rest is up to Gus. No one else looks into the camera or directs the models." Peterson retired from Bendel's in 1986.

=== Later work ===
Peterson later worked for the Metropolitan Museum of Art, retiring in 2015 as a member of its Costume Institute.

=== Personal life and death ===
Patricia and Gösta Peterson had two children, and lived on the Upper East Side of Manhattan. Gösta Peterson died in 2017, and Patricia Peterson died at home on June 15, 2025, at the age of 99.
