= James McCall (veterinary surgeon) =

Founder of Glasgow Veterinary College

- Born: 1834; Newton-on-Ayr, Scotland
- Died: 1 November 1915
- Education: Royal (Dick) Veterinary College, Edinburgh
- Occupation: Veterinary surgeon
- Known for: Founder of Glasgow Veterinary College

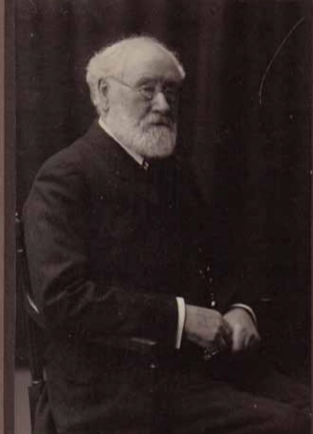
Prof James McCall c.1905

Prof James McCall FRCVS (1834, Newton-on-Ayr, Scotland — 1 November 1915) was the founder and the first principal of Glasgow Veterinary College.

== Life ==
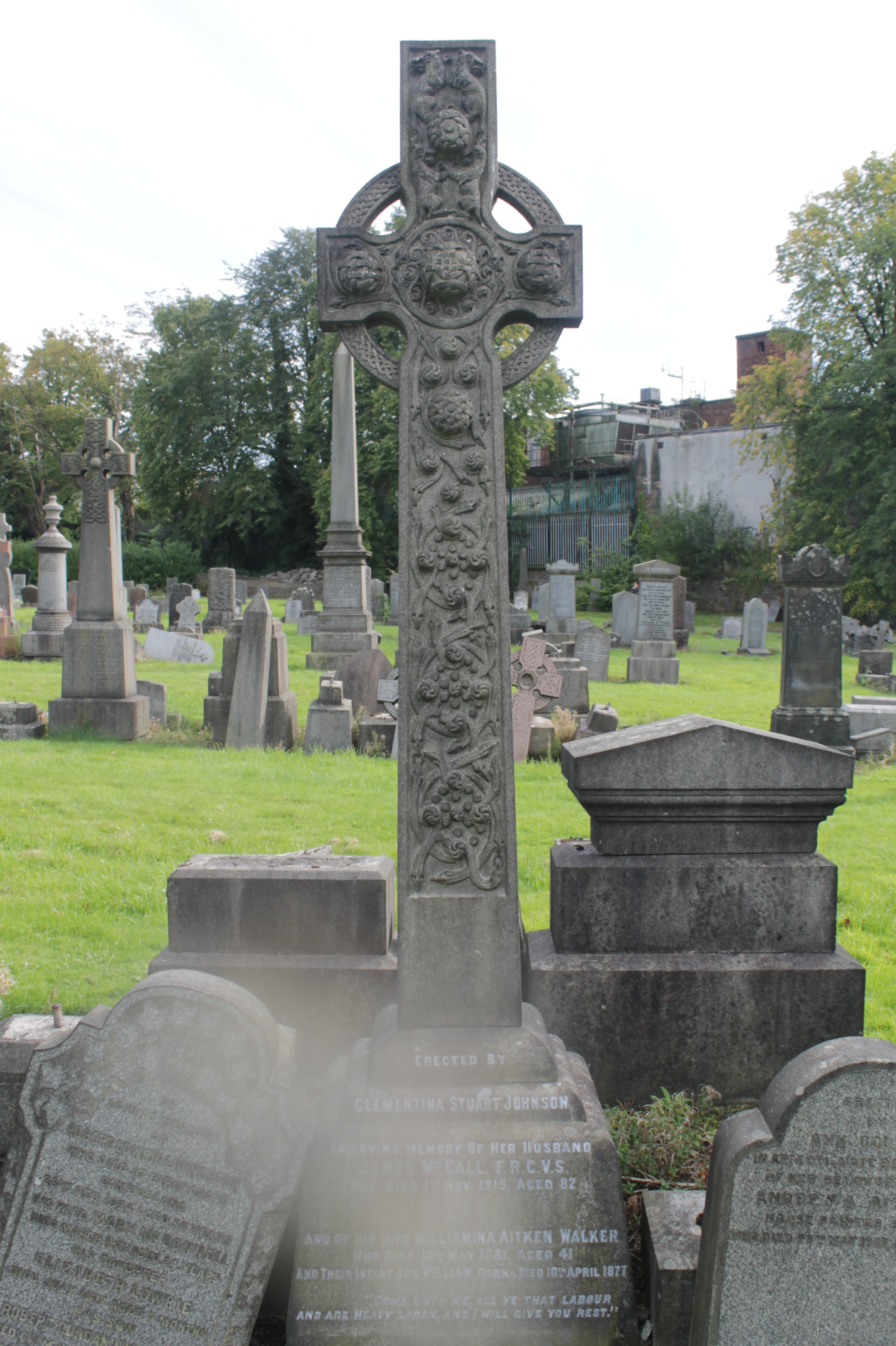
The grave of James McCall, Glasgow Necropolis

McCall was born in Newton-on-Ayr in 1834. His father owned a transport business between Glasgow and Ayr. It was here that James became involved in the welfare of horses.

James studied at Wallacetown Academy and Ayr Academy. He was originally apprenticed as a lawyer in Ayr.

Even in his early days he was interested in animals. He worked as a superintendent of the horse department with Messrs Pickford company caring for as many as 1000 horses.

McCall attended the Royal (Dick) Veterinary College in Edinburgh. After his studies, he practiced in Symington, and in 1857 returned to Edinburgh to become professor of Anatomy and Physiology. In 1859, he moved to Glasgow, and began teaching a few students alongside his work in practice. The number of students grew larger, sufficient that McCall applied for a royal charter to open a veterinary college in 1862; this was granted by Queen Victoria in 1863, and enabled his students to take examinations to become members of the Royal College of Veterinary Surgeons. At this stage he was living at 49 Bath Street.

McCall had an interest in Clydesdale horses, and was twice vice-president of the Clydesdale Horse Society.

In 1911 he was living at 4 Wilton Crescent in the Kelvinside area of north Glasgow.

He died in Glasgow on 1 November 1915. He is buried in the southmost section of the Glasgow Necropolis.

== Family ==
McCall was married twice: Williamina Aitken Walker (1840-1881) and Clementina Stuart Johnson.

He was survived by nine sons and seven daughters.

== Works ==
- Public health: as affected by food supply obtained from animals. Glasgow Veterinary College. 1885. OCLC 970701663.
