= Manda Scott =

Scottish novelist and columnist (born 1962)

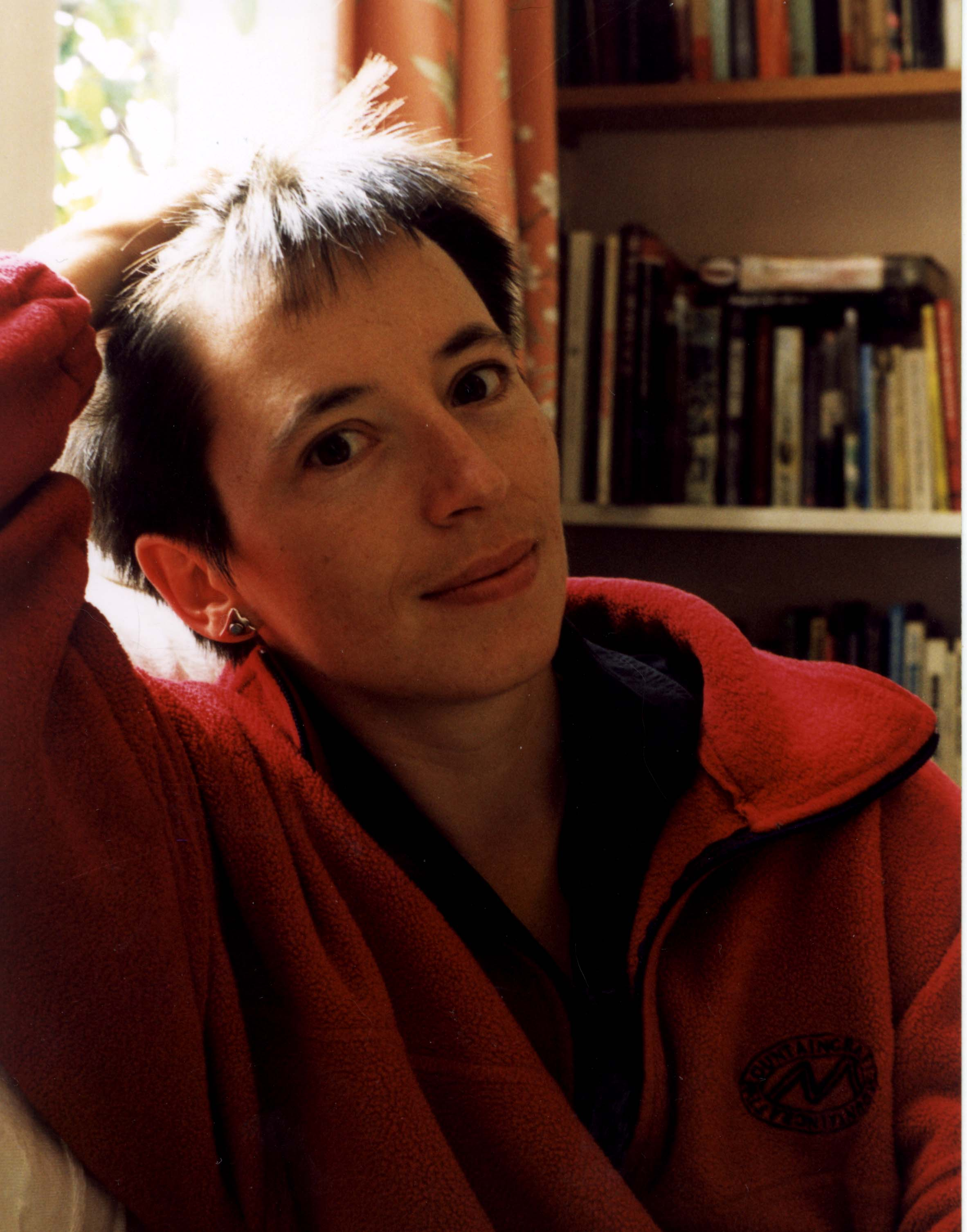
- Born: 1962 (age 63–64); Glasgow, Scotland
- Writing career
- Pen name: MC Scott
- Website: mandascott.co.uk

Manda Scott (born 1962) is a former Scottish veterinary surgeon who is now a novelist, blogger, podcaster, columnist and occasional broadcaster. Born and educated in Glasgow, Scotland, she trained at the University of Glasgow School of Veterinary Medicine and now lives and works in Shropshire.

== Writing ==
She made her name initially as a crime writer. Her first novel, Hen's Teeth, was shortlisted for the 1997 Orange Prize.

Her subsequent novels, Night Mares (1998), Stronger Than Death (1999), and No Good Deed (2001), for which she was hailed as "one of Britain's most important crime writers" by The Times, were published by Headline and are now published, along with her other books, by Transworld, an imprint of Random House.

Her fourth novel, No Good Deed, was nominated for the 2003 Edgar Award.

=== The Boudica series ===
Alongside her original contemporary thrillers, she has written two sets of four historical thrillers. The Boudica series were her first historical novels, of which Dreaming the Eagle was the first. Rooted in the pre-Roman world of ancient Britain and the Britannia it became the novels 'give us back our own history', exploring the worlds of druids (called dreamers in the book and portrayed as shamans), warriors and the Roman occupation that, in Scott's eyes, destroyed a once-great civilisation. The books centre around two primary characters: the girl Breaca, who grows into the woman who takes the title 'Boudica' (meaning 'She who Brings Victory') and her brother Bán, who, for much of the four books, is her nemesis.

=== Rome ===
Scott's Rome series (written under the ungendered name MC Scott), and beginning with The Emperor's Spy (2010), are spy thrillers, set in the same fictional universe with some of the surviving characters from The Boudica series. The first novel in the series follows the life of Sebastos Pantera, the spy whose name means 'Leopard', as he comes in from the cold of a mission in Britannia to spy for the Emperor Nero at the time of the Great Fire of Rome. In subsequent books, Pantera faces his nemesis, Saulos (aka Paul of Tarsus) in The Coming of the King, dives deep into the loss of a legion's eagle in The Eagle of the Twelfth, (the Twelfth Legion, apparently, did in fact lose their eagle, while the Ninth Legion, subjects of Rosemary Sutcliffe's Eagle of the Ninth, didn't) and returns to Rome for the Year of the Four Emperors in The Art of War.

=== Later ===
Between the two major historical series, she wrote The Crystal Skull, a dual timeline novel entered around a mythic Mayan skull, with a historical thread set in the Tudor era and a contemporary thriller set in modern-day Cambridge.

She began her dual time line novels with a fast-paced, "swift and vigorous" thriller, Into the Fire, which explores the truth behind the myth of Jeanne d'Arc – and the impact those revelations could have on modern day France.

A Treachery of Spies, winner of the 2019 McIlvanney Prize, is another dual time line, this one explores the impacts of actions by the Maquis, the SOE, the Jedburghs, and in particular, the nascent CIA on the present. It was announced in May 2020 that veteran Harry Potter producer David Barron, and Enriched Media Group have secured all TV, film and ancillary rights to A Treachery of Spies and a TV adaptation was planned.

Any Human Power is a fiction novel by Manda Scott. It has been described as a thrutopian (mytho-)political thriller. It was published by September Publishing.

In 2010, she founded the Historical Writers' Association, of which she remained Chair until 2015.

== Other activities ==
She has written regular columns for The Herald, reviews and columns for The Independent, intermittent columns for The Guardian, The Daily Telegraph, The Times and HuffPost, and has appeared occasionally on BBC Radio 4.

She also has a podcast called "Accidental Gods" which was originally going to have perhaps a dozen episodes but surpassed 200 episodes in 2023. It features a wide variety of guests and discusses issues related to the meta-crisis. A phrase to summarise what it is about is "... the podcast where we believe that another world is still possible, and that together, we can create a future we'd be proud to leave to the generations that come after us." this or something similar is said at the start of each podcast. It has music by Caro C at for the into and outro, it is produced by Alan Lowells of Airtight Studios and is done in collaboration with Faith Tilleray. The podcast has been running since 2020.

== Works ==
=== Kellen Stewart ===
- Hen's Teeth (1997)
- Night Mares (1998)
- Stronger Than Death (1999)

=== The Boudica Series ===
- Dreaming the Eagle (2003)
- Dreaming the Bull (2004)
- Dreaming the Hound (2005)
- Dreaming the Serpent Spear (2006)

=== Rome ===
- The Emperor's Spy (2010)
- The Coming of the King (June 2011)
- The Eagle of the Twelfth (May 2012)
- The Art of War (March 2013)

=== Inès Picaut ===
- Into the Fire (2015)
- A Treachery of Spies (2018)

=== Stand-alone novels ===
- No Good Deed (2001)
- The Crystal Skull (2007)
- Any Human Power (2024)

=== Non-fiction ===
- 2012: Everything You Need to Know about the Apocalypse

=== Appearance in anthologies ===
- 99%: In Fresh Blood 3 (1999), edited by Mike Ripley & Maxim Jakubowski
- New English Library Book of Internet Stories (2000)
- Scottish Girls About Town: And Sixteen Other Scottish Women Authors (2003)
- Little Black Dress: An Anthology of Short Stories, edited by Susie Maguire
