= School of Biodiversity, One Health & Veterinary Medicine, University of Glasgow =

School of Biodiversity, One Health & Veterinary Medicine
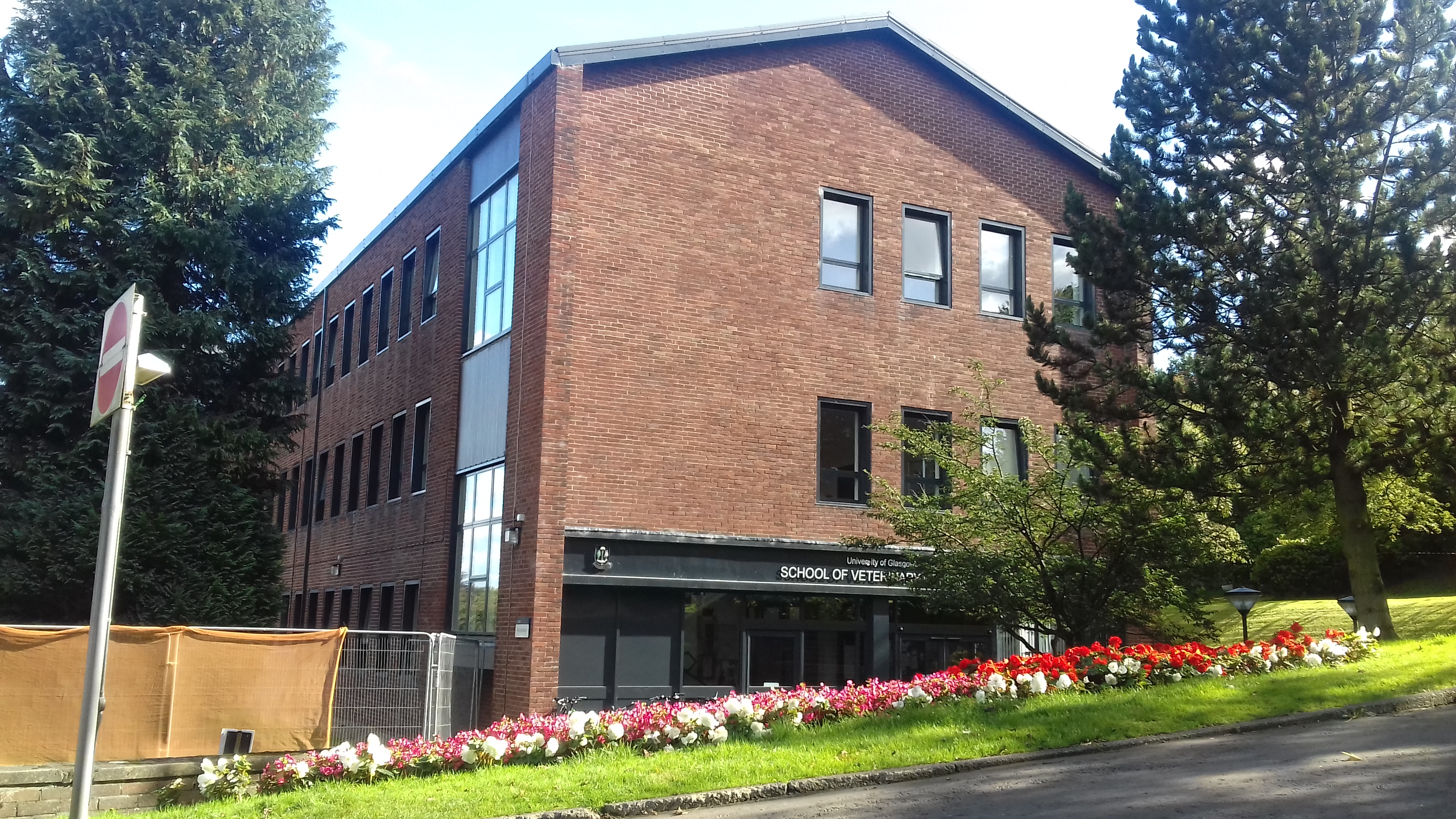
- Former names: Glasgow Veterinary College, University of Glasgow School of Veterinary Medicine
- Type: Veterinary school
- Established: 1862
- Affiliations: University of Glasgow
- Dean: Christopher Loughrey
- Administrative staff: 300
- Undergraduates: 500
- Postgraduates: 95
- Location: Glasgow, Scotland; 55.900°N 4.319°W
Colours
- Website: www.gla.ac.uk/schools/vet

The School of Biodiversity, One Health & Veterinary Medicine at the University of Glasgow is one of nine veterinary schools in the United Kingdom, and offers undergraduate and postgraduate qualifications in Veterinary Medicine.

It was established in 1862 as the independent Glasgow Veterinary College, being subsumed into the university in 1949 and gaining independent faculty status in 1969. In 2010 it became a constituent school of the new College of Medical, Veterinary and Life Sciences. It ranked second in the UK by the Complete University Guide 2016 and in 2015, QS World University Rankings ranked the veterinary school seventh in the world for veterinary medicine.

== Early days ==
In 1859, James McCall, Professor of Anatomy and Physiology at the Dick Veterinary College in Edinburgh, moved to Glasgow and started a practice in Hope Street, from which he gave informal lectures in veterinary medicine. In 1862, formal classes were instituted and the practice moved to a larger accommodation, a set of stables at 397 Parliamentary Road.

In 1863, a royal warrant was issued which established McCall's enterprise as the Glasgow Veterinary College and entitled its students to examination at the Royal College of Veterinary Surgeons; the first graduate qualified in 1865. The college was the second veterinary school in Scotland, after the Dick School in Edinburgh, McCall's alma mater, which was established in 1823. In 1873, it moved to much larger facilities in Buccleuch Street, a former pumping station, and merged into the University of Glasgow in 1949. The current Vet School was built on the Garscube Estate in 1970.

== Facilities ==
The school is now based at the Garscube Estate in Bearsden, on the outskirts of Glasgow, purchased by the university in 1948 from Sir George Campbell of Succoth. Sir George was a descendant of Ilay Campbell, Lord Succoth, who had studied Law at the university and later served as Lord President of the Court of Session and rector of the university. The main Garscube House had been used as a hospital during the Second World War. The school has a farm, a small-animal hospital and an equine hospital on the estate, as well as the James Herriot Library, named for Alf Wight, a graduate of the school who wrote under that name. The university's Wolfson Halls are also situated on the estate, as is the Garscube Sports Complex, used by the school's student rugby team as well as other students and sports clubs in the university.

The school also has facilities on the Cochno Estate, purchased by the university in 1954. The estate originally extended to some 220 acres (0.89 km^{2}), including 42 acres (170,000 m^{2}) of woodland, but is now an 850-acre (3.4 km^{2}) business enterprise, including a farm and the elegant Cochno House. Cochno was formerly the seat of the Hamiltons of Barnes, but during the late nineteenth century, the Estate was home to William Anderson Donaldson, a Glasgow iron merchant of the firm, James Watson & Company.

== Degree ==
The school presents students for the degree of Bachelor of Veterinary Medicine and Surgery (BVMS). This is one of only six degree programmes in Europe recognised by the American Veterinary Medical Association, and is one of a small number recognised automatically by the South African Veterinary Council.

The school scored 95% for 'graduate prospects' and 5B for 'research quality' in The Times' Good University Guide 2009.

== Notable alumni and staff ==
Notable alumni

- Mark Bryan, veterinarian working in New Zealand
- Michael Findlay, veterinary surgeon, author and broadcaster
- John A. Gilruth, former Administrator of the Northern Territory of Australia
- James Herriot, veterinary surgeon and author (real name Alf Wight)
- Laura Muir, veterinary surgeon and middle/long distance olympic athlete
- Prof Susan Rhind OBE is the Director of Veterinary Teaching and Chair of Veterinary Medical Education in Edinburgh
- Manda Scott, writer
- Eddie Straiton, veterinary surgeon, author and television presenter known as "the TV Vet"
- David Taylor, veterinary surgeon, founder of IZVG, author and television presenter known as "The Zoo Vet"

Notable staff

- Sir James Whyte Black (1924–2010), Nobel laureate, lecturer at the university's Veterinary School during the 1950s
- Professor Andrea Nolan, first woman dean of a British vet school
