= Michael Findlay (art expert) =

Art dealer and author residing in New York City

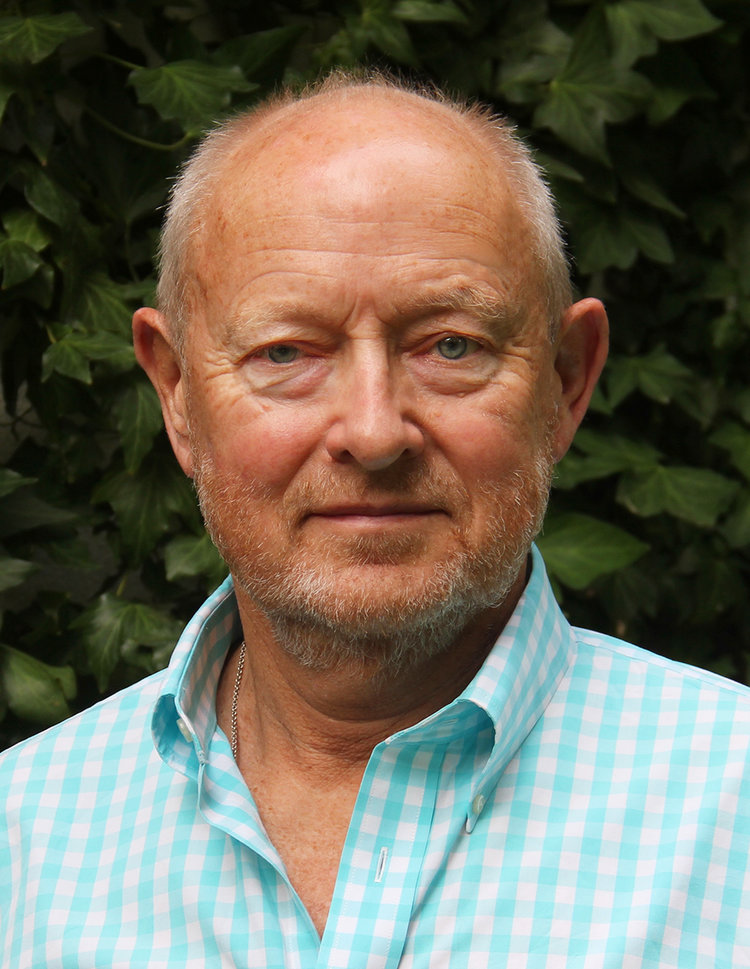
- Born: 1945 (age 80–81); Dunoon, Scotland
- Education: St. George's College (secondary school); York University (attended)
- Occupation: Art dealer
- Years active: 1964-present
- Employer: Acquavella Galleries
- Notable work: The Value of Art: Money, Power, Beauty (2012); Seeing Slowly: Looking at Modern Art (2017); Portrait of the Art Dealer as a Young Man (2024)
- Spouses: Naomi Sims (m. 1973; div. 1991); Victoria Findlay Wolfe (m. 1999)
- Children: 2
- Website: michaelfindlay.com

Michael Alistair Findlay (born 1945) is an art dealer and author residing in New York City. Findlay is a Director of Acquavella Galleries, which specializes in Impressionist and Modern European works of art as well as Post-War American painting and sculpture. Findlay is also the author of three books, The Value of Art: Money, Power, Beauty (2012), Seeing Slowly: Looking at Modern Art (2017), Portrait of the Art Dealer as a Young Man (2024).

== Childhood ==
Michael Findlay was born in Dunoon, Scotland. He was educated at St. George's College, Weybridge, England and York University, Toronto. Findlay has lived in New York City since 1964.

== Early career (1964-1984) ==
Findlay was a Director of Richard Feigen Gallery from 1964 to 1971. He curated major exhibitions in its uptown galleries, first at 24 East 81st Street, then at 27 East 79th Street, including "The Artists Collect" in 1964, a group show featuring Robert Rauschenberg, Robert Indiana, Tom Wesselmann, John Willenbecher, Lee Bontecou, George Segal, Roy Lichtenstein, Jack Youngerman, Jasper Johns, Arman, Marisol, Robert Bücker, and Ellsworth Kelly; a 1965 display of Bridget Riley's Op Art paintings, coinciding with the Museum of Modern Art's show The Responsive Eye; and “Words” in 1967, a thematic show of text-based art, which featured the work of Joseph Cornell, Enrique Castro-Cid, Marcel Duchamp, Oyvind Fahlstrom, Robert Indiana, Jasper Johns, Ray Johnson (who helped organize the show), Paul Klee, Roy Lichtenstein, Robert Rauschenberg, Peter Saul, and Kurt Schwitters.

On September 3, 1968, Findlay launched Feigen Downtown, the first contemporary art gallery to open in SoHo, at 141 Greene Street. This group exhibition featured John Baldessari, Carol Brown, David Milne, Ralph Pomeroy running from October 12–November 16, 1968. He gave American artists Hannah Wilke, John Baldessari, Stephen Mueller and Billy Sullivan their first solo exhibitions in New York. He also represented Abstract Expressionist Ray Parker.

In 1970 he established his own SoHo gallery, J.H. Duffy and Sons Ltd., which he ran until 1977. He was the first dealer in the United States to exhibit the work of Sean Scully and Joseph Beuys.

During this time, Findlay also bought and sold Impressionist and 20th-century works of art on behalf of American and European private collectors. He also secured early portrait commissions for Pop artist Andy Warhol of actor Dennis Hopper and others.

== Christie's (1984-2000) ==
Findlay joined Christie's auction house in 1984 and was the Head of the Impressionist and Modern Art Department until 1992. From 1992 until 2000 he was the International Director of Fine Arts and a member of Christie's board of directors. During his tenure at Christie's he was instrumental in the sale of various important collections, including Mr. and Mrs. Paul Mellon, Victor and Sally Ganz and Hal B. Wallis. In 1990, he supervised the sale of Dr. Gachet by Vincent Van Gogh for $82,500,000, which at the time was the highest price paid for a work of art at auction.

Findlay opened the Christie's office in Shanghai in 1994 with an exhibition of Impressionist, Modern and Contemporary masterpieces. In 1995, he was part of a small team that advised the new Shanghai Museum in the creation of a Western art program.

Findlay retired from Christie's in 2000.

== Other activities ==
A former student of St. George's College, Findlay has served on the board of The British Schools and Universities Foundation, Inc since 1972.

He has been a member of the Internal Revenue Service’s (IRS) Art Advisory Panel, which helps the IRS assess the appraisals taxpayers submit to ensure they pay the correct taxes on art they have bought, sold, or given or received as gifts or inheritance, since 2001.

He has also served on the board of directors of the New York Foundation for the Arts since 2013, and was President of the Art Dealers Association of America Foundation, from 2019-2021.

In 2022, he was appointed to the Cultural Property Advisory Committee by US President Joe Biden.

== Personal life ==
Findlay was married to African American model Naomi Sims from 1973 to 1991. Sims was the first black model to appear on the cover of a mainstream American women's magazine, Ladies' Home Journal.

He married the contemporary quilt artist Victoria Findlay Wolfe in 1999. He has two children.

== Published works ==
Findlay has published essays and art criticism in magazines and exhibition catalogues and has been writing and publishing poetry since the 1960s, when he read in venues like Judson Church and Metro Café with Ann Waldman, Gerard Malanga, Barbara Holland and others. He studied poetry with Jean Valentine, June Jordan and Kenneth Koch, and his work appears in poetry magazines, most recently Lalitamba and Cloudbank 11.

He is a contributing author of The Expert versus The Object: Judging Fakes and False Attributions in the Visual Arts, edited by Ronald Spencer and published by Oxford University Press in 2004. His book, The Value of Art: Money, Power, Beauty, was published by Prestel in 2012, and has been translated into German, Spanish, Japanese and Korean. An expanded edition was released in November 2022, updated with "new material on the latest art deals, reflections on race and culture, the impact of the pandemic on the art world."

His second book, Seeing Slowly: Looking At Modern Art, was published in August 2017 and his third book, Portrait of the Art Dealer as a Young Man, was published in September 2024.

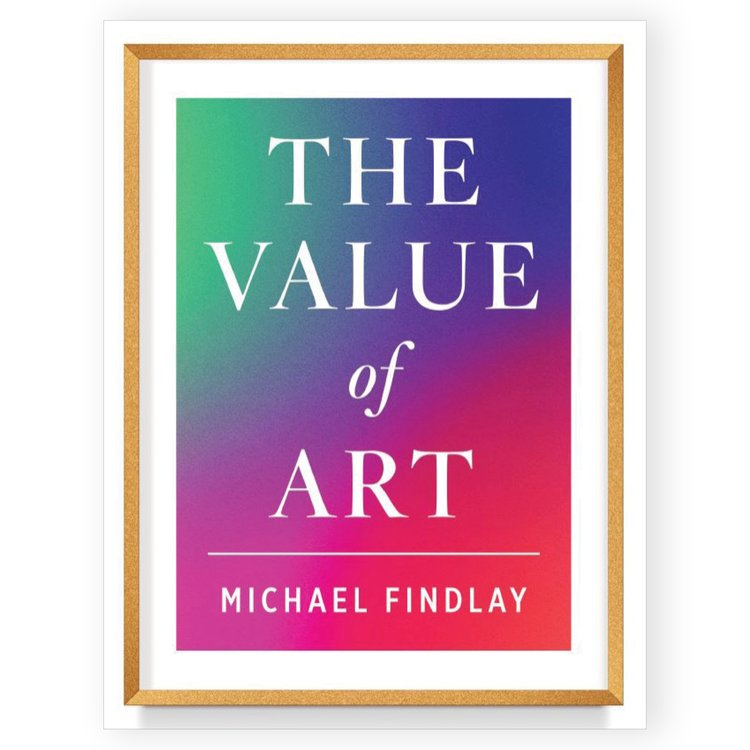
The Value of Art: Money. Power. Beauty. (Expanded Edition, 2014)

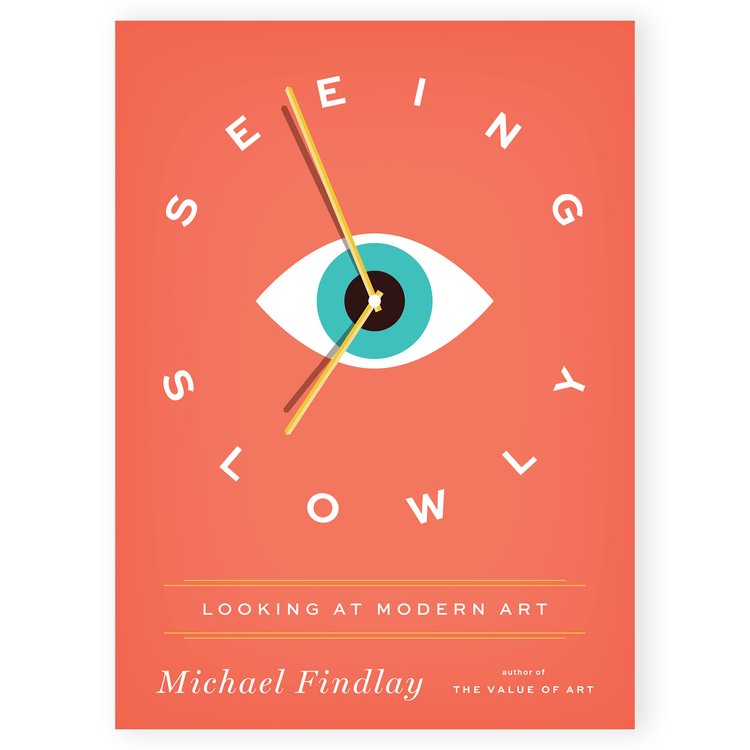
Seeing Slowly (2017)

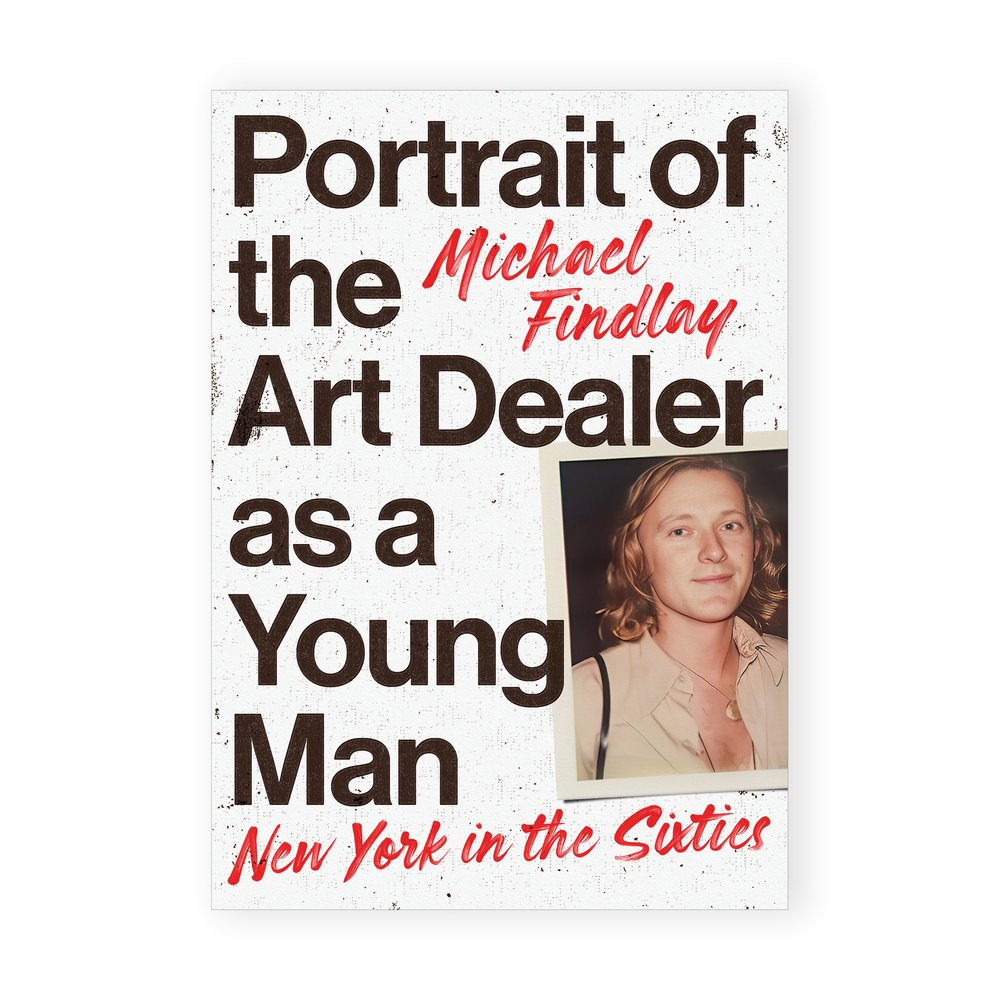
Portrait of the Art Dealer as a Young Man (2024)
