= Susan Rhind =

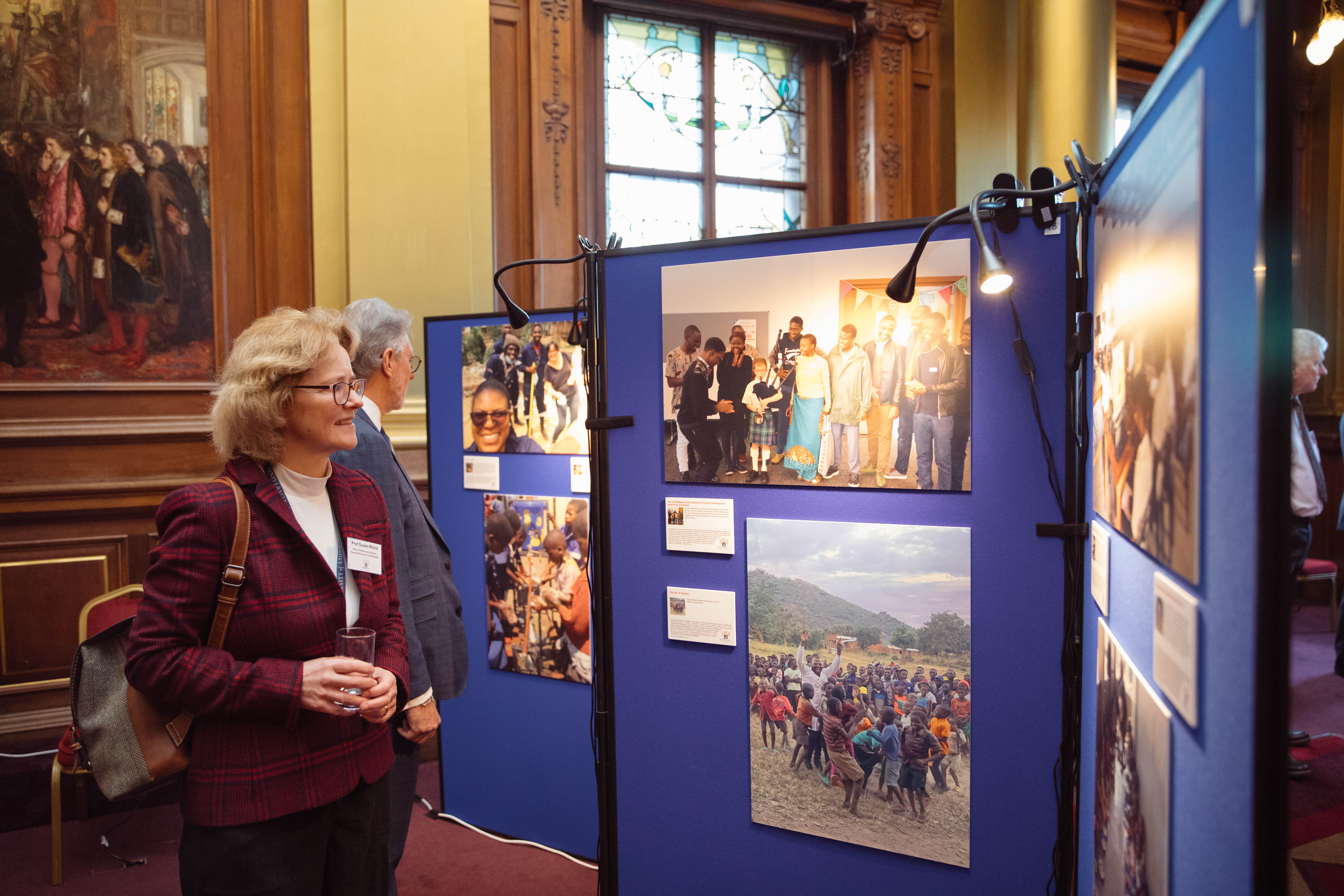
- at the Scotland Malawi Partnership's 20th anniversary exhibition
- Born: December 1967 (age 58)
- Education: Glasgow University Veterinary School
- Occupation: Chair of Veterinary Medical Education
- Employer: Royal (Dick) School of Veterinary Studies
- Known for: Chair of Veterinary Medical Education at the Royal (Dick) School of Veterinary Studies

Susan Rhind OBE (born in 1967) is a Scottish professor of veterinary science. She is the Chair of Veterinary Medical Education at the Royal (Dick) School of Veterinary Studies in Edinburgh.

Following her graduation from Glasgow University Veterinary School, Rhind worked as a vet for three years.

In 2007, Rhind became the first British Chair of Veterinary Medical Education.

When the Veterinary Record celebrated its 125th anniversary in 2013, Rhind and Andrew Gardiner described the history of Veterinary Education.

She was Deputy Head of the school when Rhind was awarded an OBE in the New Years Honours list of 2017 for her contribution to veterinary education.

In 2026, she was the lead author of a study looking at the impact of generative AI on students of veterinary science. The paper concluded that veterinary students were not using the technology as much as other disciplines.
