= Linda Rodin =

American model and beauty entrepreneur

- Born: 1947 or 1948 (age 78–79)
- Occupations: Entrepreneur; model; stylist

Linda Rodin (born 1947 or 1948) is an American beauty entrepreneur, model, and former stylist.

== Biography ==
Rodin worked as a model in the 1960s and 70s. She then built a career as a boutique owner in Soho, a buyer at Henri Bendel, and a stylist for Victoria's Secret, Harper's Bazaar and Vogue.

In 2008, she founded her beauty company, Rodin, from her kitchen in Chelsea, New York City. It was acquired by Estée Lauder in 2014. Initially focused on facial oils, the company now also produces hand creams, body oils, fragrances, and soaps.

After a forty-year hiatus from modelling, Rodin began modelling again in her 60s, working with such brands as J.Crew and The Row. She has been recognized for her distinct personal style (described in Vogue as "silver hair, oversize glasses, and bright lipstick"), which has earned her a wide following on social media and attention from fashion media.
