= Naomi Sims =

American model, businesswoman, and author (1948–2009)

- Born: Naomi Ruth Sims; March 30, 1948; Oxford, Mississippi, U.S.
- Died: August 1, 2009 (aged 61); Newark, New Jersey, U.S.
- Education: Fashion Institute of Technology
- Occupations: Model, writer, businesswoman
- Modeling information
- Height: 5 ft 10 in (1.78 m)
- Hair color: Black
- Eye color: Brown
- Agency: Wilhelmina Models
- Website: www.naomisims.com

Naomi Ruth Sims (March 30, 1948 – August 1, 2009) was an American model, businesswoman and author. She is widely credited as being one of the first African-American supermodels. Sims was the first African-American model to appear on the covers of Ladies' Home Journal and Life.

== Early life ==
Sims was born in Oxford, Mississippi, the youngest of three daughters born to John and Elizabeth Sims. Her father (whom she never knew) reportedly worked as a porter, but Sims' mother later described him "an absolute bum" and her parents divorced shortly after she was born. She was teased for her height of 5'10 at the age of 13. Elizabeth Sims later moved with her three daughters to Pittsburgh, Pennsylvania, where Naomi's mother was forced to put her child into foster care. She attended Westinghouse High School. There, due to her height, she was ostracized by many of her classmates. Sims was raised as a Catholic.

== Career ==
Sims began college after winning a scholarship to the Fashion Institute of Technology in New York City, while also taking night classes in psychology at New York University. Her early attempts to get modeling work through established agencies were frustrated by racial prejudice, with some agencies telling her that her skin was too dark. Her first career breakthrough came after she decided to sidestep the agencies and go directly to fashion photographers and Gösta Peterson, a photographer for The New York Times, agreed to photograph her for the cover of the paper's August 1967 fashion supplement.

Despite this breakthrough, Sims still found it difficult to get work, so she approached Wilhelmina Cooper, a former model who was starting her own agency, saying that she would send out copies of the Times supplement to advertising agencies, attaching Cooper's telephone number, and that Cooper's agency would get a commission if Naomi received any work. Within a year Sims was earning $1,000 a week. The key breakthrough came when she was selected for a national television campaign for AT&T, wearing clothes by designer Bill Blass. In 1968 Sims told Ladies' Home Journal,

It helped me more than anything else because it showed my face. After it was aired, people wanted to find out about me and use me.

=== Success ===
Sims became one of the first successful black models while still in her teens, and achieved worldwide recognition from the late 1960s into the early 1970s, appearing in popular fashion magazines such as Vogue, Vogue Italia, and Cosmopolitan. She also frequently collaborated with photographers Anthony Barboza, Richard Avedon, Francesco Scavullo, Irving Penn, and William Helburn and Berry Berenson. The New York Times wrote that (her) "appearance as the first black model on the cover of Ladies' Home Journal in November 1968 was a consummate moment of the Black is beautiful movement". She also appeared on the cover of the October 17, 1969, issue of Life magazine. This made her the first African-American model on the cover of the magazine. The images from the 1967 New York Times fashion magazine cover and the 1969 Life magazine cover were exhibited at the Metropolitan Museum of Art in an exhibition entitled The Model as Muse.

By 1972, Hollywood took an interest in Sims as a potential actress and offered her the title role in the movie Cleopatra Jones, but when Sims read the script, she was appalled by the racist portrayal of blacks in the movie and turned it down. Sims ultimately decided to go into the beauty business for herself. Sims retired from modeling in 1973 to start her own business, which created a successful wig collection fashioned after the texture of straightened black hair. It eventually expanded "into a multimillion-dollar beauty empire and at least five books on modeling and beauty".

Sims authored several books on modeling, health, and beauty, including All About Health and Beauty for the Black Woman, How to Be a Top Model and All About Success for the Black Woman, as well as an advice column for teenage girls in Right On! magazine.

== Personal life ==
In August 1973, she married art dealer Michael Findlay at the Church of the Blessed Sacrament. Findlay and Sims caused a stir as Findlay was white and interracial marriage in 1973 was still considered taboo. Findlay and Sims were both profiled separately in the February 1, 1970, issue of Vogue before they met and married. They had one son, Bob. Their marriage ended in divorce in 1991.

Naomi was diagnosed with bipolar disorder.

== Death ==
Sims died of breast cancer on August 1, 2009, aged 61, in Newark, New Jersey. Her funeral was held at the Church of St. Ignatius Loyola in Manhattan. She was survived by her son, Bob Findlay, a grandson, and her elder sister, Betty Sims. Her eldest sister, Doris, died in 2008.
