= Michael Findlay (veterinary surgeon) =

Michael Arthur Findlay (1944 – 7 December 2014) was a Scottish veterinary surgeon, author and broadcaster.

== Early life ==
Findlay was born in Ayr, Scotland. He was educated at Strathallan School and the University of Glasgow. Findlay graduated from the Glasgow Veterinary College in 1966 having read veterinary science.

== Career ==
Upon qualifying Findlay became an assistant vet with Henderson and Keywood in Surbiton, London. He then bought his own practice in Putney. However, he did not enjoy the administrative side of the business and turned to locum work.

In 1984 he joined Ciba-Geigy Pharmaceuticals as public affairs advisor. Thereafter, a freelance public relations advisor in 1993. He became one of the main architects of the National Vocational Qualification scheme for those caring for animals, helping to devise the course standards and materials. Latterly, he was chief executive of the PRO Dogs charity.

In the early 1980s he was the regular vet on the BBC One children's tv programme "Saturday Superstore". He was also a regular broadcaster appearing on Jimmy Youngs radio show, LBC and Capital Radio.

Findlay was a member of the Governing Council of the Cat Fancy (GCCF) Veterinary Sub-committee (now Veterinary Advisory Committee) for 46 years. He was a duty vet and had officiated at GCCF shows for as many years. Findlay was also vice-president of the London Cat Club and a member of The Kennel Club.

== Publications ==
- Angela Sayer; Michael Findlay (1996). Encyclopedia of the Cat. London: Bounty Books. ISBN 1851529233.
- Michael Findlay (1996). Cats Pet Guide. London: Hamlyn. ISBN 0600305902.
- Michael Findlay (1995). Dogs Pet Guide. London: Hamlyn. ISBN 0600305813.
- Anna Sproule; Michael Sproule (1988). Michael Findlay (ed.). The Complete Cat. London: Prion Books Ltd. ISBN 1853750301.
- Edward Bunting; Michael Findlay (1987). Cats and Kittens. London: Hamlyn. ISBN 0600551369.
- Roger A. Caras and Michael Findlay (1983). The Penguin Book of Dogs. London: Penguin Books. ISBN 0140465316.
- Fiona Hennie; Michael Findlay (1981). Fish (Junior Petkeeper's Library). London: Franklin Watts. ISBN 0531041840.
- Fiona Hennie; Michael Findlay (1981). Guinea Pigs (Junior Petkeeper's Library). London: Franklin Watts. ISBN 0531041859.
- Fiona Hennie; Michael Findlay (1981). Hamsters (Junior Petkeeper's Library). London: Franklin Watts. ISBN 0531041867.
- Fiona Hennie; Michael Findlay (1981). Mice and Rats (Junior Petkeeper's Library). London: Franklin Watts. ISBN 0531041875.
- Fiona Hennie; Michael Findlay (1980). Cats (Junior Petkeeper's Library). London: Franklin Watts. ISBN 0531041190.
- Fiona Hennie; Michael Findlay (1980). Dogs (Junior Petkeeper's Library). London: Franklin Watts. ISBN 0531041204.
- Fiona Hennie; Michael Findlay (1980). Gerbils (Junior Petkeeper's Library). London: Franklin Watts. ISBN 0531041212.
- Fiona Hennie; Michael Findlay (1980). Rabbits (Junior Petkeeper's Library). London: Franklin Watts. ISBN 0851668135.
- Jim Robins; Michael Findlay (1980). Kittens and Cats. London: Silver Burdett. ISBN 0382064569.
- Stanley Dangerfield, Angela Sayer, Christine Metcalf, Mary Dunnill, Michael Findlay, Grace Pond, Olivia Manning and Gladys Hayward (1978). The Colourful World of Cats. London: Sundial. ISBN 0904230090.
