= Kay MacDonald =

Sister Katherine "Kay" MacDonald NDS
- Mother Superior General
- Church: Catholic
- Other posts: Member of the Governing Council of Sion; Canadian Superior General; President of the International Union of Superiors General

Personal details
- Born: Katherine MacDonald; 1931 Saskatoon, Saskatchewan, Canada
- Died: August 31, 2018 (aged 86–87) Saskatoon, Saskatchewan, Canada
- Denomination: Catholic
- Parents: Lillian Catherine and Walter Cyril
- Spouse: none
- Children: none
- Occupation: Teacher; Principal; Nun
- Education: Sion Academy

Katherine (Kay) MacDonald (1931 – 31 August 2018) was a Canadian religious figure who, at the time of her appointment as president of the International Union of Superiors General, was the highest ranking woman in the Catholic Church. Her career started at a small Catholic Academy in Saskatchewan, Canada and led her to a variety of senior positions across Canada, in Rome, and in Israel. MacDonald focused her career on fighting antisemitism in the Catholic Church and improving relationships between Christian and Jewish populations. MacDonald's life and career has been documented by the National Film Board of Canada in a 2000 documentary co-production between the NFB and Four Square Productions Canada Ltd.

== Early life ==
MacDonald was born in Saskatoon, Saskatchewan in 1931 as the daughter of two rural school teachers from Prince Edward Island. She was the youngest child of her family and had four brothers: Ron, Jack, Cyril, and Bob. Her brother Cyril MacDonald was a political figure in Saskatchewan. MacDonald attended St. Joseph's Elementary School as a child and Sion Academy for high school.

== Religious career ==
=== Early years ===
On graduating high school, MacDonald spent two years in the novitiate of the Sisters of Sion before going to university. MacDonald earned a B.A. and B.Ed. in English and history from the University of Saskatchewan, an M.A. from St. Louis University, and spent time at Fordham University studying theology. On finishing her education, MacDonald worked as a teacher and principal at both Sion Academy and Austin O'Brien Catholic High School.

=== Focus on antisemitism ===
Up until this point in MacDonald's career, she felt she was serving God through education. Her experiences in Rome during the Second Vatican Council caused her to realize the antisemitism of the Catholic Church; specifically the role of Christianity in the Holocaust and learning about her orders history of forced conversions of Jewish children to Christianity. MacDonald decided to dedicate the rest of her career to attempting to combat discrimination between religious groups. Her first larger opportunity to enact this change came in 1970, when she was elected to the General Council of Congregations. After 5 years on the Council, MacDonald was elected Superior General of her order. MacDonald held this post from 1975 until 1986.

MacDonald's involvement with antisemitism led her to work with the International Council Of Christians and Jews, be elected as the president of the International Union of Superiors General (1983-1986), be appointed the associate director of the Canadian Centre for Ecumenism, and be the provincial leader for the Sisters of Sion in Jerusalem (1990-1996). It was during her time with the Canadian Centre for Ecumenism that she expanded her work from improving relations between Christians and Jews to also include Muslims.

One of the cornerstones of MacDonald's work was rewriting her orders constitution to no longer push members to convert Jews to Catholicism and to instead recognize Judaism as a valid path to God. These changes were initially rejected by the Vatican. After 4 years of fighting, it was eventually accepted. Later in MacDonald's career, she expanded this belief to include all religions instead of just Judaism.

Under MacDonald's leadership, the Sisters of Sion instituted progressive new policies including: the habit was no longer mandatory garb; the Sisters of Sion‘s constitution was changed to no longer aim to convert Jews to Catholicism and all religions were recognised as valid paths to God and salvation.

=== Awards ===
- Inter-faith Leadership Award by the North American Council of Christian and Jews
- Order of National Merit by the President of France
- 2008 Distinguished Alumna Award from St. Thomas More College at University of Saskatchewan
