= Ralph Pomeroy (poet) =

American poet

Ralph Pomeroy (October 12, 1926 – November 18, 1999) was an American poet.

== Biography ==
Born in Evanston, Illinois, and raised in Winnetka, Illinois. He attended the School of the Art Institute of Chicago and the University of Illinois. At eighteen he had already published poems in "Poetry", which was one of the leading poetry magazines in America at the time.

He pursued painting in Paris, France, in the 1940s, and then worked as an editor, art critic, curator and exhibiting artist in New York City.

In the 1950s he was active in San Francisco's poetry scene, although he was not a Beat poet.

Andy Warhol drew his portrait for a book of poems.

The New York Times published his poetry on five occasions in 1968 and 1969. The New Yorker magazine also published his poem, "2 P.M. Going Westward on the Chicago, Burlington $ Quincy," in its January 27, 1968 edition.

He taught at the Academy of Art University in San Francisco in the late 1980s and 1990s.

Many years later, he was stabbed in the chest by a "fag basher", and also suffered a broken wrist while engaged in what a friend described as "S&M games with a trick."

Pomeroy died of cirrhosis of the liver in San Francisco in November 1999.

== Writing career ==
Pomeroy was inspired by Walt Whitman.

Throughout his writing career he published essays, monographs, catalogs, three poetry collections and an illustrated book of poems with Andy Warhol entitled "A La Recherche du Shoe Perdu".

One of his books was about painter Theodoros Stamos.

A poem that he wrote, "River's Edge", was included in the anthology, A New Geography of Poets (1992).

His friend, Edward Field, discusses his life in his book: The Man Who Would Marry Susan Sontag and Other Intimate Portraits of the Bohemian Era (2007, University of Wisconsin Press) In an article for "The Gay & Lesbian Review," (July–August, 2005, Volume 11 Issue 4), Field notes that the openly gay Pomeroy was accepted by Yaddo 1955, "where he scandalized the sedate arts colony by having an open affair with painter Clifford Wright."
