= List of veterinary associations =

This is a list of veterinary associations organized by geographic region. Entries are limited to notable organizations that have their own Wikipedia articles. Regions represented include Asia, Europe, North America, and Oceania.

== Associations based in Asia ==
- Iran Veterinary Organization
- Nepal Veterinary Association
- Perhimpunan Dokter Hewan Indonesia (Indonesian Veterinary Medicine Association)

== Associations based in Europe ==
- Association of Veterinary Anaesthetists
- British Veterinary Association

== Associations based in North America ==
- American Association of Bovine Practitioners
- American Veterinary Medical Association
- Canadian Veterinary Medical Association
- Evidence-Based Veterinary Medicine Association
- Michigan Veterinary Medical Association
- Student American Veterinary Medical Association

== Associations based in Oceania ==
- Australian Veterinary Association
- New Zealand Veterinary Nursing Association
- New Zealand Veterinary Association
