= Association of Veterinary Anaesthetists =

Professional veterinary organization

The Association of Veterinary Anaesthetists (AVA) are a group of people who promote the usage, research, and study of anaesthesia in veterinary medicine.

== History ==
The Association was established in 1964, and they meet regularly in Europe to discuss various issues related to their cause. It has its administrative base on Hawkshead Lane in North Mymms, Hertfordshire, at the (main) Hawkshead Campus of the Royal Veterinary College. On April 26, 1993, the European College of Veterinary Anaesthesia and Analgesia (ECVAA) was formed to regulate qualifications in veterinary anaesthesia in Europe and is a member of the European Board of Veterinary Specialisation.

== Education ==
The AVA gives out scholarships and also provides training and education in the area of Veterinary Anaesthetists. A trust fund was established in the early 1970s and each year they give out grants to trainees studying for both RCVS and ECVAA Certificates and Diplomas in veterinary anaesthesia.

=== Publications ===
The AVA publishes the journal Veterinary Anaesthesia and Analgesia six times a year, which is also the official journal of the European College of Veterinary Anaesthesia and Analgesia and the American College of Veterinary Anesthesia and Analgesia.

== See also ==
- Anesthesiology
- List of veterinary associations
