= Veterinary medicine in Indonesia =

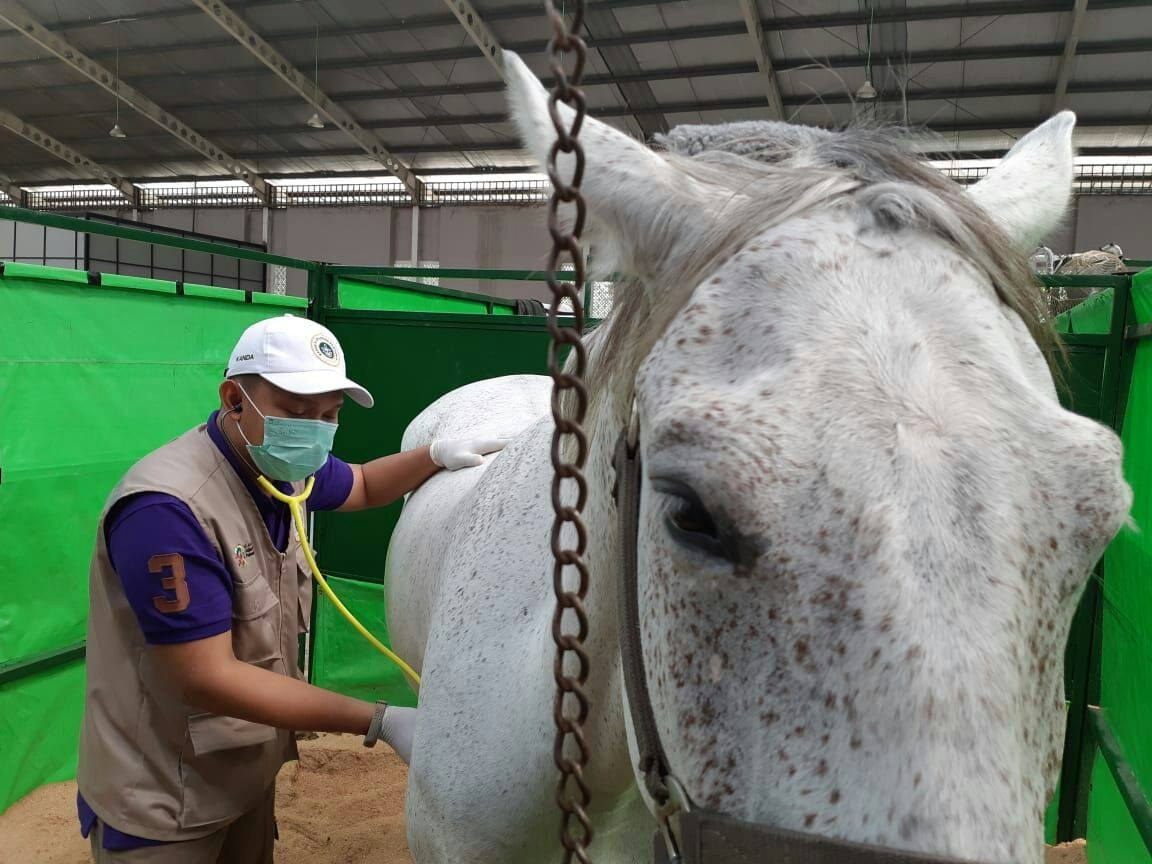
A veterinarian examining an imported horse at an animal quarantine facility for the 2018 Asian Games.

In Indonesia, veterinary medicine has been practiced for hundreds of years. Veterinary services and education were pioneered during the Dutch colonial era. As of 2023, there are 12 universities that offer veterinary education. The professional organization for veterinarians is the Indonesian Veterinary Medical Association (PDHI).

Some veterinarians in Indonesia open their own practices, either independently or in groups. Others work for the Government of Indonesia, private companies, or non-profit organizations. They provide medical services, consulting, research, and teaching. Some veterinarians also become entrepreneurs in fields related to animal health, such as in the animal drug industry, livestock, and animal food processing. The motto of Indonesian veterinarians is "manusya mriga satwa sewaka", which means "serving human welfare through the animal world."

== Education ==
=== Bachelor's degree ===
In Indonesia, veterinary education is pursued at the university level. Undergraduate education (S1) typically spans eight semesters. Upon completion of this stage, one is awarded a Bachelor of Veterinary Medicine (S.K.H.) degree. As of 2024, there are 13 universities in Indonesia with veterinary faculties or study programs, which are collectively affiliated with the Association of Indonesian Veterinary Medicine Faculties (AFKHI). These universities are:

1. Syiah Kuala University (USK) — Banda Aceh, Aceh
2. Riau University (Unri) — Pekanbaru, Riau
3. State University of Padang (UNP) — Bukittinggi, West Sumatra
4. IPB University (IPB) — Bogor, Jawa Barat
5. Padjadjaran University (Unpad) — Bandung, Jawa Barat
6. Gadjah Mada University (UGM) — Sleman, Yogyakarta
7. Airlangga University (Unair) — Surabaya, Jawa Timur
8. Wijaya Kusuma University, Surabaya (UWKS) — Surabaya, Jawa Timur
9. Brawijaya University (UB) — Malang, Jawa Timur
10. Udayana University (Unud) — Denpasar, Bali
11. Mandalika University of Education (Undikma) — Mataram, Nusa Tenggara Barat
12. Hasanuddin University (Unhas) — Makassar, Sulawesi Selatan
13. Nusa Cendana University (Undana) — Kupang, Nusa Tenggara Timur
Map of locations of universities with veterinary faculties or study programs in Indonesia

=== Professional education ===
After obtaining a bachelor's degree, individuals can pursue professional education (co-assistance), which requires a minimum of two semesters. The national curriculum for the veterinary professional program encompasses veterinary pathology, internal medicine, surgery, veterinary public health, veterinary reproduction, laboratory diagnosis, and is complemented with off-campus activities, such as internships or fieldwork practices. Following the completion of all co-assistance stages, individuals who pass the judiciary process will take a veterinary oath before attaining the title of veterinarian (drh). Starting in 2021, the Competency Examination for Veterinary Professional Education Student (UKMPPDH) has been established as an exit exam and is one of the graduation requirements for obtaining a National Certificate of Veterinary Competency.

=== Postgraduate education ===
Several universities offer postgraduate education in veterinary science at both master's (S2) and doctoral (S3) levels. However, the study programs and concentrations available may vary. For instance, at the master's level, UGM offers a Veterinary Science Study Program with six specializations and one concentration, (Note: Specialization: (1) Poultry Disease and Health Management, (2) Bioreproduction, (3) Biopathology, (4) Veterinary Clinical Science, (5) Bioscience, (6) Veterinary Epidemiology and Public Health; and one concentration: Indonesian Veterinary Field Epidemiology.) IPB offers an Animal Biomedical Sciences Master's Study Program with six specializations, (Note: (1) Physiological Sciences and Medicinal Efficacy, (2) Health Parasitology and Entomology, (3) Veterinary Public Health, (4) Medical Microbiology, (5) Reproductive Biology, and (6) Animal Biomedical Sciences.) Unair offers four study programs, (Note: (1) Reproductive Biology, (2) Veterinary Disease and Public Health Science, (3) Veterinary Agribusiness, (4) Vaccinology and Immunotherapeutics.) Unud offers a Master's Study Program in Veterinary Medicine, while Unsyiah offers a Veterinary Public Health Master's Study Program. Meanwhile, doctoral programs are available at IPB, UGM, and Unair.

=== Veterinary specialist ===
In Indonesia, there is no formal veterinary professional education program for specialist. However, AFKHI and PDHI have planned specialized education programs for surgery, radiology, internal medicine, pathology, laboratory animals, and reproduction.

== Veterinary practice ==
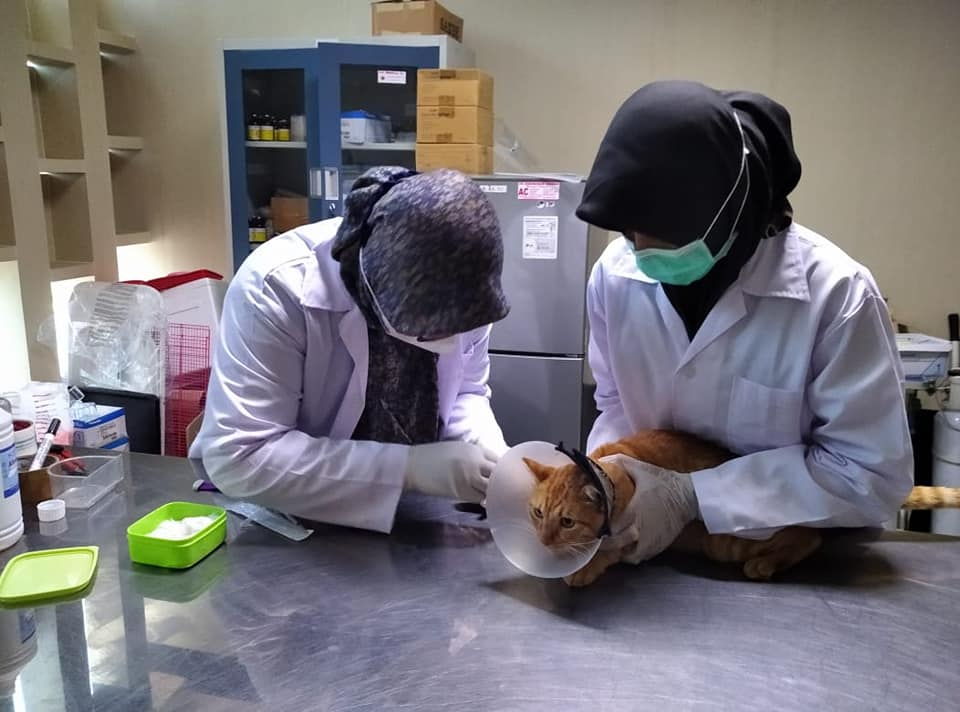
Two veterinarians examining a cat.

Veterinary science is practiced by veterinarians and, to a more limited extent, by the bachelors of veterinary science and veterinary paramedics. All three are classified as animal health workers. The number of veterinarians in Indonesia ranges from 15 thousand to 20 thousand people.

The domain of work for veterinarians can be viewed from various perspectives. Based on the type of animals they serve, veterinarians can provide care for pets, livestock, and wild animals. Pet owners and enthusiasts, including those who own dogs, cats, birds, and even exotic pet animals like snakes and iguanas, recognize the importance of animal health and therefore seek the services of a veterinarian. Livestock, which refers to animals kept for economic purposes, such as a source of food, industrial raw materials, or as aids in human labor, must be kept in good health. Food derived from sick animals can lead to health problems in humans. Therefore, the health of livestock sector animals such as cows, goats, sheep, pigs, chickens, and ducks, as well as fish and shrimp in the fisheries sector, falls under the supervision of veterinarians. As for wild animals, veterinarians are responsible for their health to ensure their survival and sustainability. Protected animals like Sumatran tigers, Sumatran elephants, rhinos, clouded leopards, and sun bears are often injured due to poaching and require veterinary care.

In the public or government sector, veterinarians with civil servant status can work as medical veterinarian or quarantine veterinarian. Both of these are functional roles exclusively held by veterinarians. In addition to this, government veterinarians can also work as lecturers, researchers, and in other positions that require veterinary knowledge and expertise. In the private sector, aside from practicing in veterinary clinics or animal hospitals, veterinarians are involved in various industries, such as animal husbandry, pharmaceuticals, and food safety.

== Professional organization ==
In Indonesia, the professional organization for veterinarians is the Indonesian Veterinary Medical Association (PDHI). This organization was established on January 9, 1953, in Lembang, West Java. However, the precursor to this organization existed during the Dutch colonial era, specifically in 1884, under the name of the Dutch East Indies Veterinary Medicine Association. PDHI has 53 branches across all provinces in Indonesia and oversees 20 non-territorial organizations that cater to veterinarians with similar interests, skills, or fields of work. For example, the Indonesian Quarantine Veterinarian Association (IDHKI) and the Indonesian Association of Small Animal Practitioner Veterinarians (ADHPHKI) are included in this network. The motto of Indonesian veterinarians is "manusya mriga animal sewaka," a Sanskrit phrase that translates to "serving human welfare through the animal world".

== History ==
=== The period before independence ===
==== 1800s ====
Veterinary medicine was practiced during the Dutch colonial era, beginning in 1820 when R.A. Coppicters, a veterinarian from the Netherlands, arrived in the Dutch East Indies. He was responsible for the care of animals that held significance for the Dutch colonial government, such as the horses used by the military troops. During this time, those who practiced veterinary medicine were referred to as "vee arts," which literally translates to "livestock doctor." This term indicated that animals like dogs, cats, and wild animals were not considered part of the realm of veterinary service.

The government institution responsible for veterinary affairs was established in 1841, initially named the Veterinary Medicine Service (Veeartsenijkundige Dienst), and later renamed the Civil Veterinary Medicine Service (Burgerlijke Veeartsenijkundige Dienst) in 1853. In 1851, several Dutch veterinarians were documented in Indonesia. (Note: One source states that there were only two veterinarians, while another source states that there were five veterinarians in Indonesia in 1851.) The limited number of veterinarians at the time resulted in suboptimal services. From 1853 to 1869, only three veterinarians served the entire island of Java, with one located in West Java, another in Central Java, and a third in East Java. It wasn't until 1869 that two veterinarians were stationed outside of Java: one in Sumatra and one in Sulawesi.

In 1861, the Dutch established a veterinary school named the Inlandsche Veeartsen School (IVS) in Surabaya. Dr. J. van der Weide served as the head of this school. (Note: Another source wrote that the name of the IVS leader was Dr. J. van der Helde) The school provided a two-year education program for native Indonesians (bumiputras) as students. However, IVS ceased operations in 1875 after producing only eight bumiputra veterinarians (inlandsche veearts) over the course of nine years.

Following the closure of IVS, from 1875 to 1880, education took the form of an internship with a government veterinarian (gouvernements veearts) in Purwokerto. Nine native youths underwent internships under the guidance of seven government veterinarians, and eight of them graduated in 1880. Shortly after, the Dutch East Indies experienced outbreaks of various animal diseases, beginning with rinderpest in 1875, followed by anthrax and hemorrhagic septicemia in 1884, surra in 1886, and foot-and-mouth disease in 1887. Rabies, a lethal disease affecting both animals and humans, was first reported in 1884 in a buffalo. The disease was then discovered in dogs in 1889 and in humans in 1894. In response to these outbreaks, the first veterinary organization was established in 1884 under the name the Dutch East Indies Veterinary Association (Nederland-Indische Vereeniging voor Diergeneeskunde).

There was a proposal to integrate veterinary education with medical education at STOVIA (School of Indian Medical Education), which was put forward by the Director of the Civil Service Department (Binnenlands Bestuur). Although this idea was approved by the Minister of Colonial Affairs (Minister van Kuncien) in the Netherlands, it was not implemented due to objections raised by the Director of the Department of Education, Worship, and Crafts (Onderwijs, Eeredienst en Nijverheid) and the director of STOVIA.

==== 1900–1945 ====
The presence of rabies led the Dutch East Indies Government to enact several ordinances (regulations) concerning the rabid dog disease. One example is Gazette (Staatsblad) of 1906 Number 283, which required dog owners to report the number of their dogs, provide identification in the form of a medal, and pay dog tax. Meanwhile, the first regulation specifically addressing animal health is Gazette of 1912 Number 432 regarding the Review of Provisions concerning Government Supervision in the Animal Sector and Animal Police. (Note: This ordinance is also often referred to as the "Staatsblad" concerning Government Intervention in the Animal Sector.) This ordinance covered various aspects, including the management of institutions handling animal affairs, the authority of the government in the export and import of animals to prevent disease spread, the regulation of veterinary authorities, and the eradication of infectious animal diseases.

Veterinary authority or the medical authority of veterinarians was regulated in Gazette of 1912 Number 432 Article 34 Paragraph 1 which, when translated, states: "The veterinary authority, or veeartsnijkundige, is inherent to veterinarians after graduating from a veterinary faculty in Indonesia or in the Netherlands." Additionally, Gazette of 1915 Number 732, which ratified the Criminal Code, also addressed animals. (Note: There are 11 articles in the Criminal Code relating to animals. They are Article 101, 271, 302, 406, 407, 490, 494, 501, 540, 541, and 549.) According to Gazette No. 432 and the Criminal Code, the definition of livestock only included ruminants, one-toed animals, and pigs, which meant that veterinarians, more specifically livestock doctors, focused their attention solely on these animals.

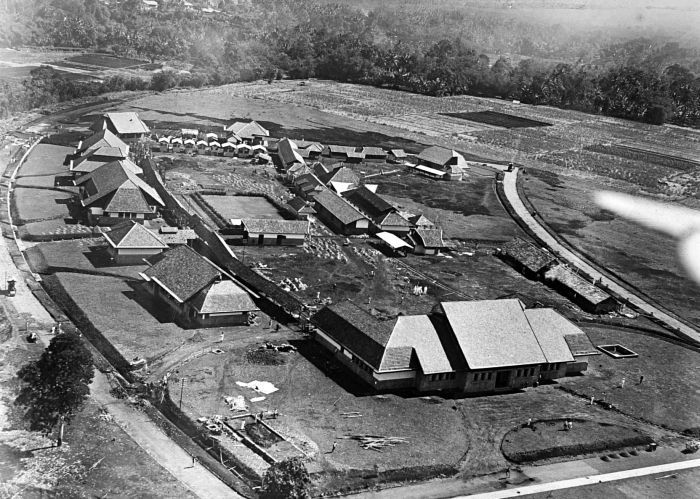
Veterinary school in Bogor (photo taken between 1900 and 1940)

In 1908, the Dutch established a Veterinary Laboratory (Veeartsenijkundig Laboratory; currently known as the Bogor Veterinary Research Center) to address rinderpest. This laboratory also introduced a four-year education program for native veterinarians called "Cursus tot Opleiding van Inlandsche Veearstsen." The students were drawn from Hogere Burgerschool (HBS) or Meer Uitgebreid Lager Onderwijs (MULO) graduates (junior high school level) and other equivalent schools. The first two students were MLS (Middelbare Landbouwschool or Agricultural High School) graduates, which is equivalent to high school, so they were directly admitted at level III.

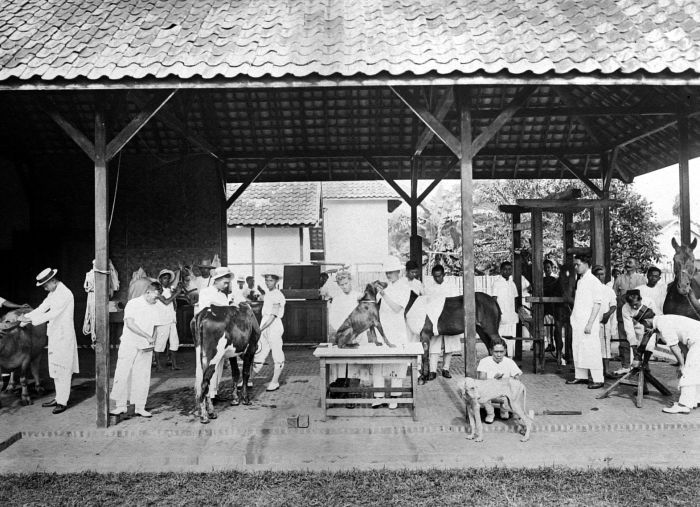
Practicum at Bogor veterinary school

Initially, this course was overseen by Koningsberger, the Head of the Bogor Botanical Gardens and Zoological Museum. In 1908, L. de Blieck took over as the head of the veterinary laboratory, and the following year, he was also entrusted with the responsibility of directing the course. In 1910, (Note: other sources stated that the year was 1906.) there was a change in the name, and "Inlandsche Veeartsenschool" (Bumiputra Veterinary School) was chosen to replace the course name. Simultaneously, the position of principal (as well as head of the laboratory) changed to director. Johannes Alexander Kaligis, a student from Minahasa, graduated in 1910 as Indonesia's first veterinarian. In 2010, one hundred years after Kaligis' graduation, a centenary celebration of Indonesian veterinarians was held.

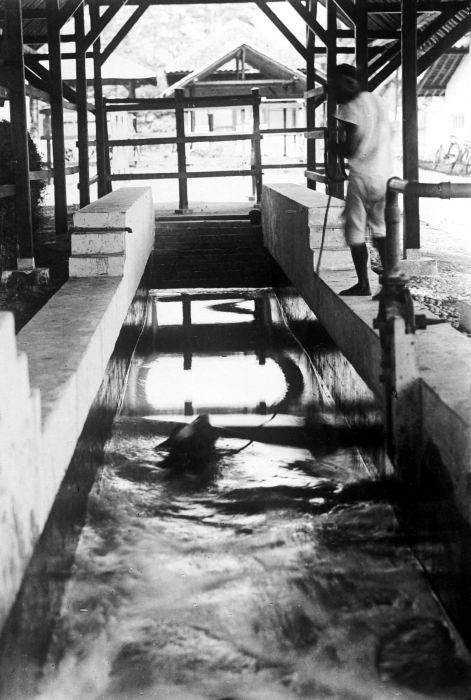
Dipping tub for disinfecting livestock at the Bogor veterinary school.

In 1914, the name of the institution was changed again to the Dutch East Indies Veterinary School (Nederlands Indische Veeartsenschool, abbreviated as NIVS). This school accepted students from various backgrounds, not only natives. NIVS was later merged with the laboratory to form the Veterinary Institute (Veeartsenijkundig Instituut, abbreviated as VI). However, in 1919, NIVS was once again separated from the institute and became independent. German language was also taught so that students could read veterinary literature in German. Exceptional NIVS graduates were given the opportunity to continue their studies at the Faculty of Veterinary Medicine in Utrecht, Netherlands, by starting directly at level III. Alongside Kaligis, Indonesian veterinarians who graduated from Utrecht included Soeparwi (who later became the first dean of the UGM Faculty of Veterinary Medicine), Iskandar Titus, and A.A. Ressang. In 1942, the Veterinary Institute was renamed the Animal Disease Investigation Center (BPPH), which underwent several more name changes after Indonesian independence.

During the Japanese occupation, the name NIVS was changed to Bogor Semon Zui Gakko. This school was then closed when Japan surrendered to the allied forces. The total number of Indonesian veterinarians produced since the establishment of IVS, its subsequent renaming to NIVS, and finally to Semon Zui Gakko, was 143 individuals.

=== The period after independence ===
==== 1945–1949 ====
Following the Proclamation of Indonesian Independence, the Veterinary School (SDH) in Bogor was reopened. The status of SDH was elevated to Veterinary College (PTKH) as per the Decree of the Minister of Prosperity No. 1280a/Per. on September 20, 1946, with a five-year education program. Vice President Mohammad Hatta officially inaugurated PTKH in November 1946, appointing Dr. Mohede as rector magnificus, the term for PTKH leaders.

Due to the turmoil of the Indonesian War of Independence, PTKH came under Dutch control, leading to the suspension of lecture activities. In 1947, with the approval of the PTKH chancellor and the Ministry of Prosperity, a parallel class named the Republic of Indonesia Veterinary College (PTKH-RI) was established in Klaten, Central Java. Meanwhile, in Bogor, the Dutch established the Faculteit der Diergeneeskunde (Faculty of Veterinary Medicine) in May 1948, which became part of the Universiteit van Indonesië.

When Yogyakarta, as the capital of the Republic of Indonesia, was invaded during the Dutch Military Aggression II on December 19, 1948, PTKH-RI was closed. The PTKH-RI class was reopened on November 1, 1949, after Yogyakarta came under the control of the Indonesian Government. However, the location was moved from Klaten to Yogyakarta. On December 19, 1949, all universities in Yogyakarta were merged to form the Gadjah Mada State University, and PTKH-RI was transformed into the UGM Faculty of Veterinary Medicine (FKH). As the first dean of FKH UGM, one of Soeparwi's endeavors was to replace the term "vee arts" (livestock doctor) with "dieren arts" (animal doctor) in order to broaden the scope of knowledge and services in this profession. The period of conflict with the Dutch finally concluded after the successful Round Table Conference, and Indonesian sovereignty was reestablished on December 27, 1949.

==== 1950–1999 ====
Indonesia became a member of the World Organisation for Animal Health (WOAH) in 1950. As a member country, one of Indonesia's obligations was to report the occurrence of certain animal diseases in the country. This responsibility was undertaken to uphold the principles of transparency and reporting concerning the status of animal diseases worldwide.

On February 3, 1950, Universiteit Indonesia was established, comprising several faculties, including agriculture and veterinary medicine in Bogor. The name of the Faculteit der Diergeneeskunde was changed to Fakulteit Veterinary Medicine Universiteit Indonesia (FKH-UI). Through Law Number 10 of 1955, the terms "facultit" (used by UGM) and "fakulteit" (used by UI) were unified to become "faculties," while "universiteit" was changed to "university."

To address the widespread outbreak of foot-and-mouth disease (FMD), the government established the Foot-and-Mouth Disease Investigation Center (BPPMK) in Surabaya in 1952. The name of this institution underwent several changes, including becoming the Foot-and-Mouth Disease Investigation Institute (1955) and the Foot-and-Mouth Disease Institute (1959). In 1964, this institution produced 58,300 doses of FMD vaccine for the first time. As the role of this institution expanded to handle more diseases, such as rabies and Newcastle disease, its name was changed to the Institute for Veterinary Virology (1967), the Pharma Veterinaria Center (1978), Pharma Veterinary Center (2012), and Pusvetma Pharma Veterinary Center (2023). The center was tasked with production, testing, distribution, marketing, and the development of vaccines, antiserum, diagnostic materials, and other biological materials.

On January 9, 1953, an organization of veterinarians called the Association of Veterinary Experts, which had existed since the beginning of Indonesia's independence, held its inaugural congress in Lembang, West Java. During this congress, the Indonesian Veterinary Medical Association (PDHI) was established as a professional organization for Indonesian veterinarians.

As veterinary education progressed, it became integrated with animal husbandry. At UGM, the Faculty of Veterinary Medicine was renamed the Faculty of Veterinary Medicine and Animal Husbandry (FKHP) on June 21, 1955. However, on November 10, 1969, the Faculty of Veterinary Medicine and the Faculty of Animal Husbandry were separated. A similar transition occurred at UI, where the name Faculty of Veterinary Medicine was changed to the Faculty of Veterinary Medicine and Animal Husbandry (FKHP) UI in 1960. In 1962, the name Faculty of Veterinary Medicine UI was reinstated, while animal husbandry education was merged with fisheries to create the Faculty of Animal Husbandry and Fisheries UI. In 1962, the name reverted to Faculty of Veterinary Medicine UI, while animal husbandry education merged with fisheries to form the Faculty of Animal Husbandry and Fisheries UI.

In Banda Aceh, the Faculty of Veterinary Medicine and Animal Husbandry was established on October 17, 1960, as part of the University of North Sumatra. On September 2, 1961, Syiah Kuala University (USK) was founded by the Decree of the Minister of Higher Education and Science (PTIP) Number 11 Year 1961, dated July 21, 1961, with FKHP as one of its faculties. (Note: The name FKHP Unsyiah later changed to FKH Unsyiah on October 10, 1985 when the Department of Animal Husbandry was integrated into the Faculty of Agriculture.)

In East Java, veterinary education was developed in partnership with Airlangga University in Surabaya and Brawijaya University in Malang. Brawijaya University established the Faculty of Veterinary Medicine and Animal Husbandry (FHKP) in 1961, which was subsequently inaugurated through PTIP Ministerial Decree Number 92 Year 1962, under the auspices of Airlangga University. In the following year, FKHP was fully managed by Brawijaya University through PTIP Ministerial Decree Number 1 of 1963. In Bogor, the government established the Bogor Agricultural Institute (IPB) on September 1, 1963, through PTIP Ministerial Decree Number 91 of 1963. Since then, FKH UI was changed to FKH IPB. In Surabaya, the Department of Veterinary Medicine was opened on November 25, 1969. This department fell under FKHP Brawijaya University in Malang. In 1972, veterinary education at Brawijaya University, Malang, was fully transferred to Airlangga University, Surabaya, forming the Faculty of Veterinary Medicine, Airlangga University.

In 1967, after decades of using Dutch legacy legislation, the Indonesian Government passed Law Number 6 of 1967, addressing the Basic Provisions for Animal Husbandry and Animal Health. This law expanded the definition of animals to encompass "all animals that live on land, whether domesticated or wild." Furthermore, the application of veterinary science was broadened to include animal health, veterinary public health, and animal welfare.

In Denpasar, Bali, Udayana University (Unud) established a Department of Veterinary Medicine in 1978 under FKHP. Five years later, FKHP Unud underwent a name change to the Faculty of Animal Husbandry and Veterinary Medicine Study Program. In 1997, it attained the status of a faculty with the establishment of the Faculty of Veterinary Medicine at Udayana University.

Indonesia successfully eradicated foot-and-mouth disease in 1986, following the last outbreak discovered in Blora, Central Java, in 1983. This FMD-free status were officially recognized in Southeast Asia region in 1987, and the WOAH acknowledged it worldwide in 1990.

In 1992, the government established the legal framework for implementing animal quarantine through Law Number 16 of 1992 concerning Animal, Fish, and Plant Quarantine. This regulation aimed to prevent the entry, spread, and release of certain animal diseases and fish diseases, referred to as quarantine pests and diseases for animals (HPHK) and quarantine pests and diseases for fishes (HPIK), respectively. Animals were defined as terrestrial animals, while fish were categorized as aquatic biota.

==== 2000–present ====
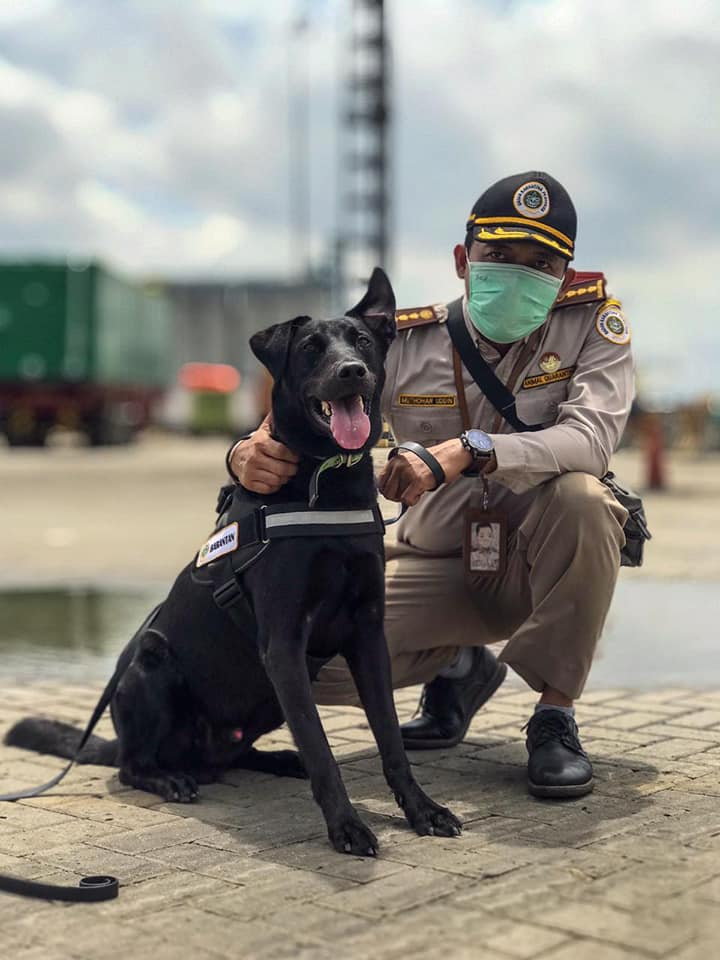
Indonesian quarantine veterinarian with a detection dog in the Tanjung Priok Port area

In 2000, Indonesia achieved the status of being free from rinderpest as recognized by the WOAH and FAO. The last reported case of this disease in Indonesia was in 1907. Globally, rinderpest was declared eradicated in 2011.

In the field of education, Veterinary Medicine Study Program was opened in 2001 in the University of West Nusa Tenggara Mataram, which later merged with Mataram Institute of Teaching and Education Science into Mandalika University of Education in 2019. Veterinary education at private universities commenced in 2008 when Wijaya Kusuma University Surabaya established the Faculty of Veterinary Medicine. In the same year, Brawijaya University Malang reopened the Veterinary Medicine Program, which has since become FKH Brawijaya University.

The government issued a new law governing the field of veterinary medicine, specifically Law Number 18 of 2009 concerning Animal Husbandry and Animal Health. This law replaced Law Number 6 of 1967, which had been in effect for decades. FIve years later, the law was subsequently updated through Law Number 41 of 2014.

In 2010, veterinary study programs were established at Nusa Cendana University in Kupang and Hasanuddin University in Makassar. Additionally, Padjadjaran University in Bandung introduced a Veterinary Medicine Study Program under the Faculty of Medicine in 2019. In the same year, the government passed Law Number 21 of 2019 concerning Animal, Fish, and Plant Quarantine to replace Law Number 16 of 1992. This new law not only focuses on disease prevention but also empowers quarantine officials to oversee and regulate food safety, feed safety, genetic engineering products, genetic resources, biological control agents, invasive alien species, wild plants and animals, as well as rare plants and animals.

The COVID-19 pandemic in Indonesia prompted practicing veterinarians to explore telemedicine as a viable option. However, its implementation encountered various challenges, including client characteristics, the legal aspects of telemedicine, cost determination, and accurate diagnosis establishment.

== Notable person ==
- Asrul Sani — veterinarian, writer, and screenwriter
- Marah Roesli — veterinarian and writer
- Taufiq Ismail — veterinarian and writer
