= American College of Veterinary Anesthesia and Analgesia =

Specialist veterinary college

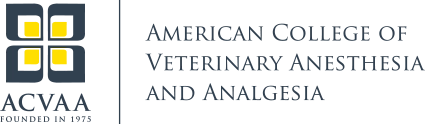
- Abbreviation: ACVAA
- Established: 1975; 51 years ago
- Type: Specialist veterinary college
- President: Sebastien Bauquier
- Publication: Veterinary Anaesthesia and Analgesia
- Website: acvaa.org

The American College of Veterinary Anesthesia and Analgesia (ACVAA) is one of 22 veterinary specialist organizations recognized by the American Veterinary Medical Association.

== History ==
The American Society of Veterinary Anesthesiology (ASVA) was founded in 1970 during an AVMA conference in Las Vegas, Nevada. The founding officers were Drs. Charles E. Short, William V. Lumb, Donald C. Sawyer, Lawrence R. Soma, and Daniel Roberts, with Dr. Short serving as the first president. The society received approval from the AVMA the following year.

In 1971, the ASVA appointed a committee headed by Dr. John Thurman to establish anesthesiology as a formally recognized AVMA specialty. A proposal was prepared and submitted to the AVMA Council on Education in 1973; however, it was initially rejected, with the COE advising that anesthesiologists be incorporated into the existing internal medicine or surgery specialty colleges. However, two years later, the proposal was granted preliminary recognition, and the ASVA became the American College of Veterinary Anesthesia (ACVA). The first qualifying exam was held in 1976, and full AVMA accreditation was awarded in 1980.

In 2012, recognizing the pivotal role of the specialty in treating pain in animals, the ACVA added "analgesia" to the name of the college, becoming the American College of Veterinary Anesthesia and Analgesia (ACVAA).

== Membership ==
Members of the ACVAA are board-certified specialists in veterinary anesthesia and analgesia and may refer to themselves as Diplomates of the American College of Veterinary Anesthesia and Analgesia (DACVAA). In order to become a diplomate, veterinarians must have earned a Doctor of Veterinary Medicine (DVM) degree or equivalent, completed a 12 month postgraduate internship, completed training in an approved residency program (3 years minimum), and passed the ACVAA certifying exam. The certifying exam consists of separate multiple choice, essay, and clinical competency exams over a period of 2-3 days. Publication of original research is required for candidates to sit for the exam.

As of 2020, the AVMA reported 291 active ACVAA diplomates.

== Function ==
The ACVAA serves as the only recognized organization in North America granting board certification in veterinary anesthesia and analgesia. Members of the ACVAA are sought for their expert opinion on matters related to veterinary anesthesia and analgesia. They may be employed in private or academic veterinary hospitals, research institutions, or in health-related industries. Veterinary anesthesiologists fill a wide variety of roles, from clinical practice to research and education in the field of veterinary anesthesia and pain management. The ACVAA occasionally publishes guidelines and position statements to promote best practices in veterinary anesthesia.

Veterinary Anaesthesia and Analgesia is the official scientific publication of the ACVAA, ECVAA, and the Association of Veterinary Anaesthetists.

== Executive officers ==
Years	Position	Name
2025-2026	President	Dr. Sebastien Bauquier
2025-2026	President-Elect	Dr. Lydia Love
2022-2023	Past President	Dr. Kurt Grimm
2020-2021	Past President	Dr. Colin Dunlop
2018-2019	Past President	Dr. Christine Egger
2022-Present	Executive Secretary	Dr. Maria Killos
2016-2021	Past Executive Secretary	Dr. Lynne Kushner

== Residency programs ==
Most veterinary anesthesia residency programs are filled through the Veterinary Internship and Residency Matching Program. ACVAA-approved residency programs are registered at the following institutions:

- Auburn University
- Colorado State University
- Cornell University College of Veterinary Medicine
- Hebrew University of Jerusalem
- Iowa State University College of Veterinary Medicine
- Kansas State University College of Veterinary Medicine
- Louisiana State University
- Michigan State University College of Veterinary Medicine
- Mississippi State University
- Murdoch University
- North Carolina State University College of Veterinary Medicine
- Ohio State University
- Oregon State University
- Purdue University
- Royal Veterinary College
- Texas A&M College of Veterinary Medicine
- The University of Queensland
- Tufts University
- University of California, Davis
- University of Florida College of Veterinary Medicine
- University of Georgia College of Veterinary Medicine
- University of Guelph
- University of Illinois College of Veterinary Medicine
- The University of Melbourne
- University of Minnesota
- Université de Montréal Faculty of Veterinary Medicine
- University of Pennsylvania School of Veterinary Medicine
- University of Prince Edward Island
- University of Tennessee
- University of Wisconsin-Madison
- Virginia-Maryland College of Veterinary Medicine
- Washington State University College of Veterinary Medicine
- Western College of Veterinary Medicine

== See also ==
- European College of Veterinary Anaesthesia and Analgesia
- Association of Veterinary Anaesthetists
