= James A. Roth =

American veterinary microbiologist and immunologist

- Born: James Allen Roth; Grinnell, Iowa, U.S.
- Education: Iowa State University (DVM, MS, PhD)
- Awards: Member, National Academy of Medicine (2016); Fellow of the American Association for the Advancement of Science (2020)
- Scientific career
- Fields: Veterinary medicine, Microbiology, Immunology
- Workplaces: Iowa State University College of Veterinary Medicine

James A. Roth is an American veterinary physician, microbiologist, and immunologist. He is an emeritus Distinguished Professor in the Department of Veterinary Microbiology and Preventive Medicine at the Iowa State University College of Veterinary Medicine. He established and served as the Director of the Center for Food Security and Public Health (CFSPH) and the Institute for International Cooperation in Animal Biologics (IICAB).

== Early life and education ==
Roth was born in Grinnell, Iowa. He earned his Doctor of Veterinary Medicine degree from Iowa State University in 1975, followed by a Master of Science degree in 1979 and a PhD in veterinary microbiology (immunology) in 1981.

== Career ==
Roth joined the faculty of Iowa State University in 1977, rising through the academic ranks to become a full professor in 1988. In 1995, he was named a Distinguished Professor in the College of Veterinary Medicine.

In 2002, following the September 11 attacks and subsequent concerns regarding agroterrorism, Roth founded the Center for Food Security and Public Health (CFSPH) with funding from the Centers for Disease Control and Prevention (CDC). Under his leadership, the center has become a leading resource for training and information on zoonotic and foreign animal diseases.

His professional appointments include serving as the executive director of the Institute for International Cooperation in Animal Biologics (IICAB). Both the CFSPH and IICAB are World Organisation for Animal Health (WOAH) Collaborating Centres. He has also served on the National Science Advisory Board for Biosecurity (NSABB).

== Research ==
Roth's research has focused on veterinary immunology, vaccinology, and preparedness for transboundary animal diseases and emerging infectious diseases. His work emphasized evaluation of neutrophil function in disease pathogenesis and the development, evaluation, and optimal use of veterinary vaccines, and their role in animal and public health.

As founder and executive director of the Institute for International Cooperation in Animal Biologics (IICAB), Roth collaborated with government agencies, industry, and international organizations to improve the safety, efficacy, and global availability of veterinary vaccines. His research and outreach activities addressed evaluation of vaccine safety and efficacy and regulatory considerations for veterinary vaccines.

Roth also contributed to applied research relevant to preparedness for foreign and emerging animal diseases. His work included studies on vaccination strategies for economically important livestock diseases and policy-relevant analyses supporting national animal health preparedness and response planning for high-consequence diseases such as foot-and-mouth disease and African swine fever.

== Selected awards and honors ==
- Diplomate, American College of Veterinary Microbiologists, 1982
- Norden Distinguished Teacher Award, Iowa State University, 1983, 1993
- Outstanding Young Alumnus, Iowa State University, 1985
- Award for Mid-Career Achievement in Research, Iowa State University Foundation, 1994
- Award for Outstanding Achievement in Research, Iowa State University, 1994
- Clarence Hartley Covault Distinguished Professor, Iowa State University, 1995
- Distinguished Veterinary Immunologist Award, American Association of Veterinary Immunologists, 1997
- International Service Award, Iowa State University, 2000
- 12th International Veterinary Congress Prize, American Veterinary Medical Association, 2001
- Public Service Award, American Veterinary Medical Association, 2006
- APHIS Administrator's Award for Contributions in Animal Health, United States Department of Agriculture, 2013
- Elected Member, National Academy of Medicine, 2016
- Senator John Melcher, DVM Leadership in Public Policy Award, Association of American Veterinary Medical Colleges, 2018
- Oscar W. Schalm Lecturer, UC Davis Alumni Reunion Weekend, 2018
- Fellow of the American Association for the Advancement of Science (FAAAS), 2020
- Charles Valentine Riley Memorial Lecture, American Association for the Advancement of Science, 2021
- Stange Award, Iowa State University College of Veterinary Medicine, 2022
- Elected Fellow, Conference of Research Workers in Animal Diseases, 2024
