= American College of Animal Welfare =

Professional association

- Abbreviation: ACAW
- Established: 2012; 14 years ago
- Location: 1931 N Meacham RD STE 100, Schaumburg, IL
- President: LaVonne Meunier
- Treasurer: David S Miller
- Secretary: Ron Banks
- Website: acaw.org

The American College of Animal Welfare (ACAW) is a fully recognized specialty in the field of veterinary medicine by the American Veterinary Medical Association (AVMA). Their goal is to advance the welfare of animals through education, certification, and Scientific investigation. The ACAW is responsible for overseeing the training, examination, and board certification of animal welfare specialized veterinarians in the field.

The college was founded in 2012 and is recognized by the AVMA as a veterinary specialty organization. As of 2023, there were 61 ACAW board-certified veterinarians (diplomates).
