= Zoological medicine =

Zoological medicine refers to the specialty of veterinary medicine that addresses the care of captive zoo animals, free ranging wildlife species, aquatic animals, birds, reptiles and amphibians, and includes non-domestic companion animals (or exotic pets). Zoological medicine incorporates principles of ecology, wildlife conservation, and veterinary medicine, and applies them to wild animals in natural and artificial environments. As a specialty of veterinary medicine in the United States, the American Veterinary Medical Association (AVMA) has recognized the College of Zoological Medicine as the governing body of this specialty field since 1983. As such, zoological medicine is equivalent to other subspecialties of veterinary medicine (such as surgery, anesthesia, internal medicine, pathology, etc.), which are recognized and governed by their particular colleges.

The American College of Zoological Medicine (ACZM) is an international organization composed of 152 members (as of May 2014), which recognizes, establishes and regulates standards and criteria necessary for veterinarians to be true specialists in zoological medicine. The board certification in zoological medicine encompasses expertise in general captive zoo medicine, aquatic animal medicine, avian medicine, reptile and amphibian medicine, and free-ranging wildlife medicine. A specialist in zoological medicine recognized by the College of Zoological Medicine is called a diplomate. Board certified diplomates of the ACZM serve as clinical veterinarians, zoo managers, wildlife veterinarians, wildlife conservation agents, researchers, teachers, government officials, and other similar leadership roles. Current certifying examinations are available in general zoo, wildlife, aquatics and zoological companion animals.

== Zoological Medicine Training Programs ==
The following Training Programs are approved by the American College of Zoological Medicine:

- Illinois Zoological & Aquatic Animal Residency Program (IZAAR)
- Veterinary College at Copenhagen University (Copenhagen Zoo)
- Lincoln Park Zoo
- Ohio State University (Columbus Zoo)
- National Zoological Park
- Cornell University
- North Carolina State University
- Louisiana State University
- Oklahoma State University (Oklahoma City Zoo/Tulsa Zoo)
- Michigan State University (Potter Park Zoo/Toledo Zoo/Michigan DNR)
- Ontario Veterinary College (Toronto Zoo)
- Texas A&M University
- University of California Davis (Captive Wildlife Emphasis/ Zoological Companion Animal Emphasis)
- University of Georgia
- University of Florida
- University of Tennessee
- University of Wisconsin-Madison
- University of Zurich (Zurich Zoo)
- University of Veterinary Medicine Hanover (Wuppertal Zoo)
- Wildlife Conservation Society
- Université de Montréal (Granby Zoo)
