= ABVP (disambiguation) =

ABVP is an acronym that may refer to:

- American Board of Veterinary Practitioners
- Akhil Bharatiya Vidyarthi Parishad, an Indian student organisation
