= Well-bird exam =

Veterinary examination for birds

A well-bird exam is a check-up for birds which are assumed to be healthy. These examinations are frequently performed by an avian veterinarian when the bird is first acquired and annually thereafter.

== The examination ==
The veterinarian will likely ask the owner about the bird's housing, diet, and activities, then examine the birds feathers, eyes, ears, and nares for signs of illness. He or she will probably acquire a Gram's stain, and may also clip the bird's wings and toenails if requested. He or she will likely offer advice about caring for the pet.

== Importance ==
Birds often hide their illnesses very well, and an avian veterinarian may see symptoms of illness that are not observable to the untrained eye. Periodic examination serves as a baseline for comparison for future reference. If an examined bird ever becomes sick and requires the care of a veterinarian, he or she will already have much data about the bird's weight (one of the earliest indicators of illness in birds), diet, and care.

== See also ==
- Wing clipping
