= Wing clipping =

Trimming a bird's wing feathers to prevent flight

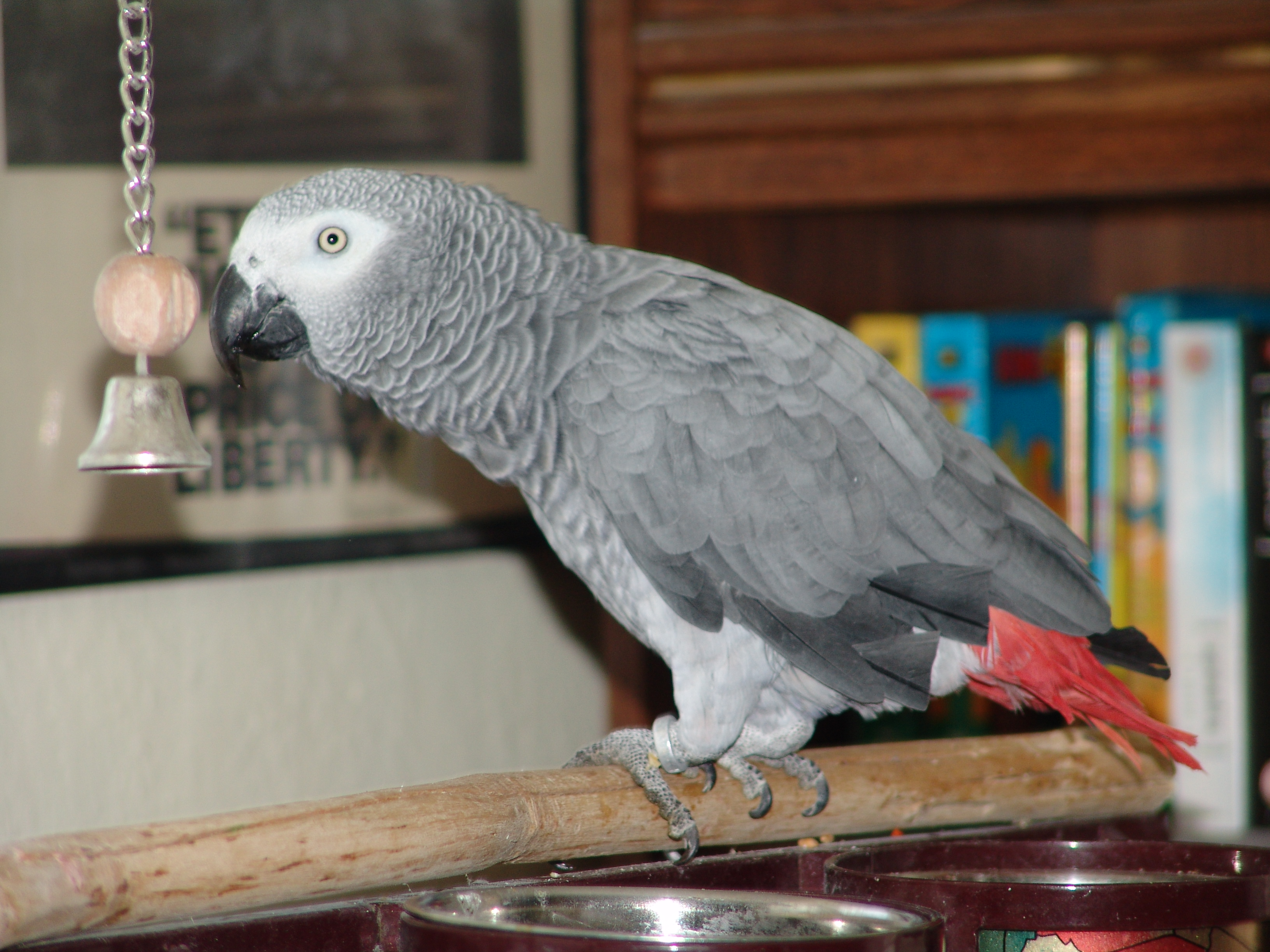
A wing-clipped grey parrot

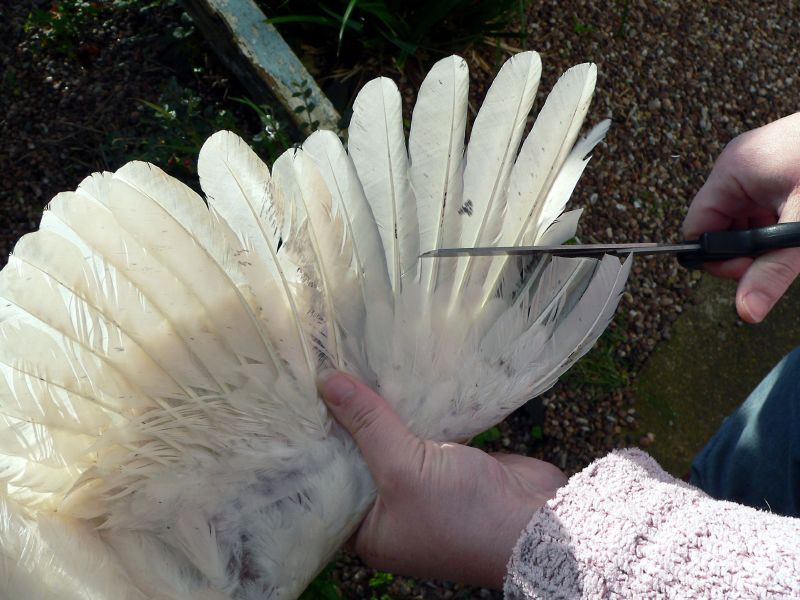
Clipping the wing feathers of a domestic chicken with scissors

Wing clipping is the process of trimming a bird's primary wing feathers or remiges so that it is not fully flight-capable, until it moults, sheds the cut feathers, and grows new ones.

== Technique ==
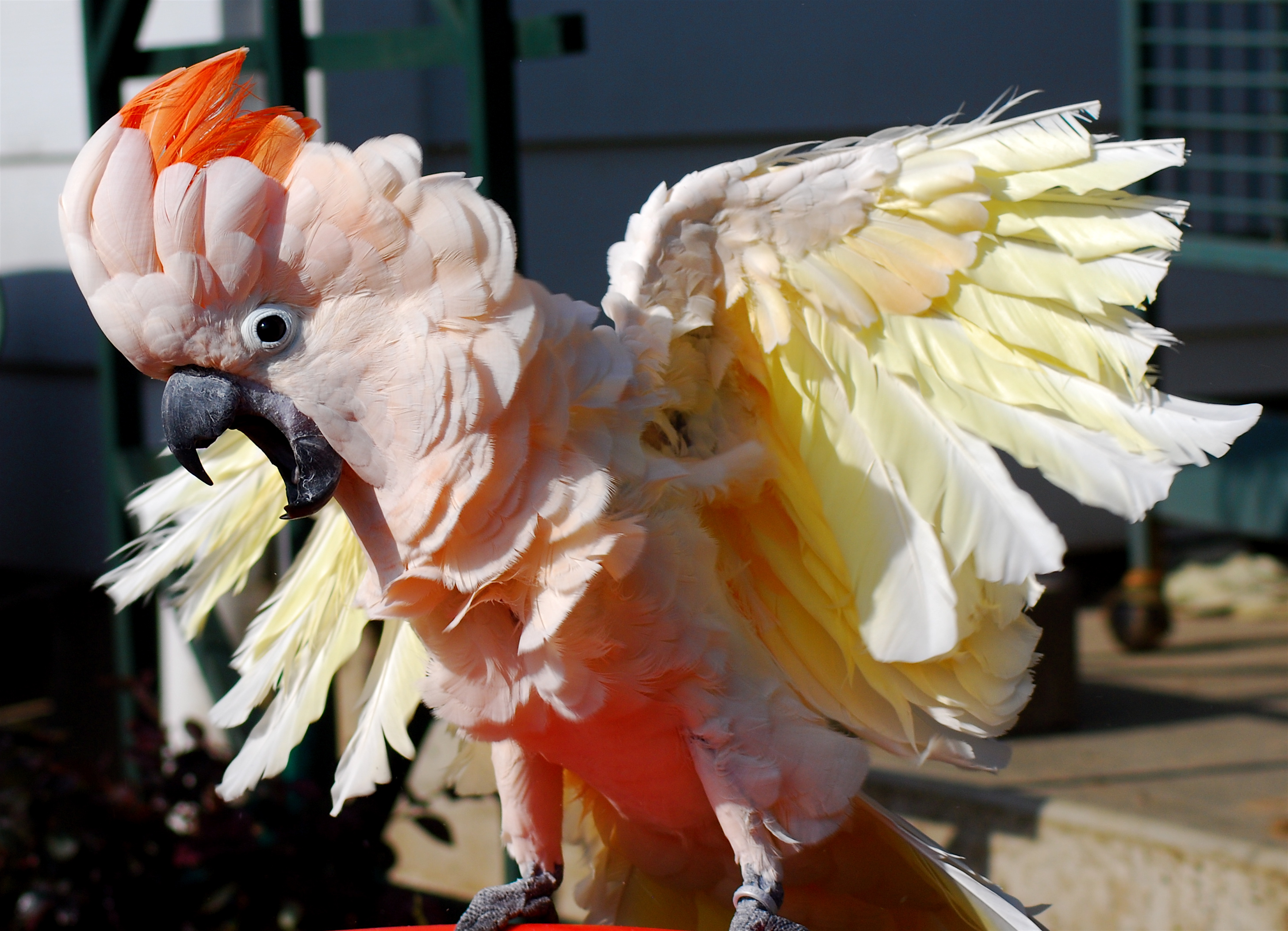
A Moluccan cockatoo with its primary wing feathers clipped

Wing clipping is usually performed by avian veterinarians, pet store employees, breeders, or the birds' owners themselves. It is generally carried out on pet birds, particularly parrots. If performed correctly, it is a painless procedure and is quite distinct from pinioning, which is carried out by amputation of the wing at the carpal joint. It is, however, not harmless as it can lead to indirect injury from falls, and is known to cause psychological distress.

Techniques for clipping the wings vary primarily in the number of feathers cut and the amount of each feather left behind. A mild clip on one wing only can impair a bird's flight greatly, as it renders the bird unbalanced in the air. This can cause injury or death to the bird if it strikes a hard surface during a fall. In most cases, only the primary flight feathers are cut, and an equal number of feathers are trimmed on each wing to avoid causing the bird to become unbalanced in flight. The most common clip involves trimming the primary flight feathers below the level of the primary coverts (usually removing about half to a third of the length of the flight feather). This clip is quick and simple to do, but leaves exposed cut ends that occasionally may cause a bird to chew on the cut feathers. Another method of clipping involves cutting the flight feather above the level of the coverts, so almost the entire feather is removed. This clip does not leave any exposed cut ends, but as more of each feather is removed, fewer feathers should be cut. However, these cut feather stumps are still present and may irritate the bird, causing significant discomfort.

Where parrots have clipped primary feathers, the moulting sequence of these birds renders them vulnerable to damage of their growing blood feathers. Most parrots have 10 primary feathers, numbered 1 (innermost) to 10 (outermost). The moult starts by the bird shedding and replacing a central primary feather, usually number 6. The sequence continues in both directions along the primaries, so the last primary feathers to be replaced are the innermost and the outermost ones numbered 1 and 10, respectively. Clipped birds, therefore, have their first blood feathers growing down without the normal protection of full-length feathers lying next to them. These unprotected blood feathers are vulnerable to being broken and profuse bleeding can occur. Regardless of their size, most parrots replace their feathers by a daily growth rate of 3 to 4 mm. Thus, large species such as macaws may take over a year to complete a moult, but smaller species such as cockatiels will moult within a few weeks. So, larger birds, and those with a higher wing-loading, remain vulnerable to blood feather damage for a longer period, since they are moulting almost continually.

A 'light' symmetrical wing-clip allows a bird to fly down and land safely while indoors. However, such a clip may not prevent the bird from flying when outdoors, since lift is generated in proportion to wind speed. Many escaped birds that are recovered are found to have been clipped. So, while a light clip allows downward flight indoors, it does not prevent a bird gaining lift if it should escape outdoors. Conversely, a more severe clip certainly renders a bird flightless, but it increases the risk of injury if the bird falls and hits a hard surface. In addition to the physical effects of wing-clipping, adverse behavioural effects can occur. Birds use flight as an instinctive reflex action and as their first means of escaping any threat; they take to the air to fly upwards and away from the source of the threat; their fear then dissipates. Where this behaviour is prevented by wing-clipping, this innate reflex action is denied the bird, and its fear does not subside. This may cause behavioural problems for the afflicted bird. When a bird needs to reduce its speed during flight, it employs a 'reverse thrust' action by extending its wings vertically and using the drag of its primaries as air brakes. While the reduced function of the clipped bird's primaries prevent propulsion and therefore lift, this also reduces braking abilities, so clipped birds may crash-land at higher speeds than full-winged birds. Clipped birds should not be taken outdoors unrestrained, as even clipped birds have been known to fly away when spooked outdoors.

It is generally considered very important for a young bird to be allowed to fledge (learn to fly) properly, prior to any wing clipping. Breeders and owners usually find that a fledged bird, even after being clipped, will remain more confident and active than an unfledged bird. Learning to fly also helps a bird learn how to land safely, an important skill even in clipped birds.

== Controversy ==
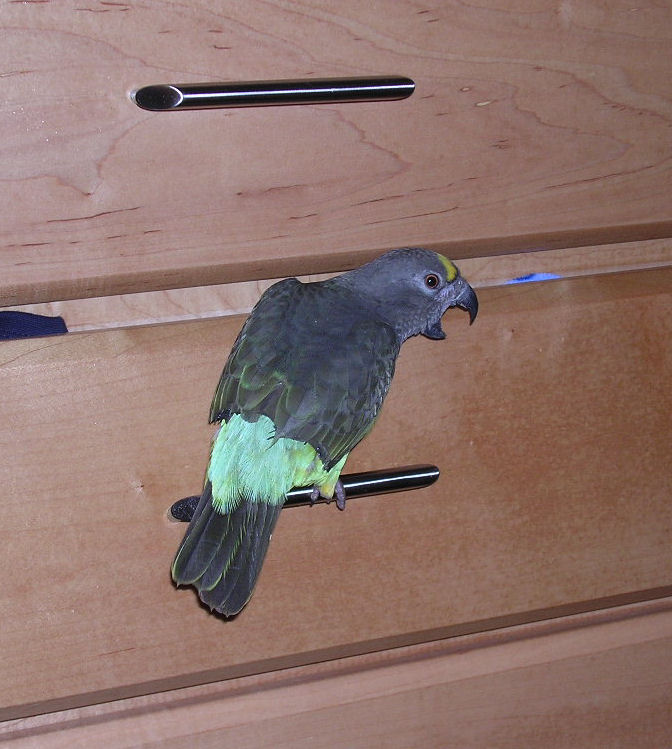
A wing-clipped Meyer's parrot perching on a drawer handle

By restricting flight, wing clipping may help prevent indoor birds from risking injury from ceiling fans or flying into large windows, but no evidence shows that clipped birds are safer than full-winged ones, only that clipped birds are subject to different kinds of accidents from full-winged birds. Social pet birds (such as parrots) may also be clipped both to restrict independence and in attempts to make them tamer and easier to manage to encourage them to socialize with their owners; some parrots that show aggression to certain people or other birds may be clipped to prevent attack. Others advocate for birds to be trained to respond to flight commands, mitigating the need for wing clipping.

While clipping is endorsed by some avian veterinarians, others oppose it. Some people feel wing clipping is a cruel or unhealthy practice, as it denies a bird its most natural way of getting around, obtaining exercise, and avoiding fearful situations. Although clipped birds can and should be encouraged to do wing-flapping exercises, this does not provide the same exercise as flight. Others feel that for birds that can climb well, wing clipping is a necessary safety practice for birds in many situations. The practice seems more prevalent in American bird care books than in similar British publications.
