= Pinioning =

Removal of a portion of a bird's wing to prevent flight

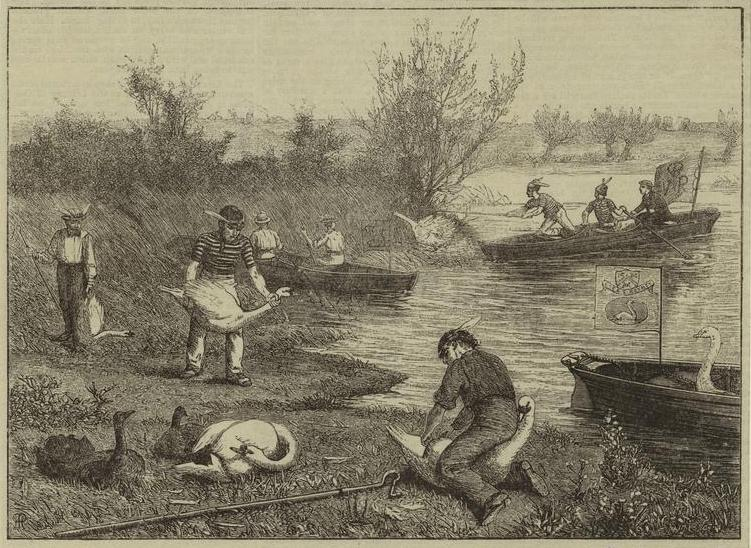
1875 illustration of swans being pinioned during the Swan Upping

Pinioning is the act of surgically removing one pinion joint, the joint of a bird's wing furthest from the body, to prevent flight. Pinioning is often done to waterfowl and poultry. Sometimes it is done in zoos in order to have birds in roofless enclosures. It is not typically done to companion bird species such as parrots. This practice is restricted in many countries.

== Procedure ==
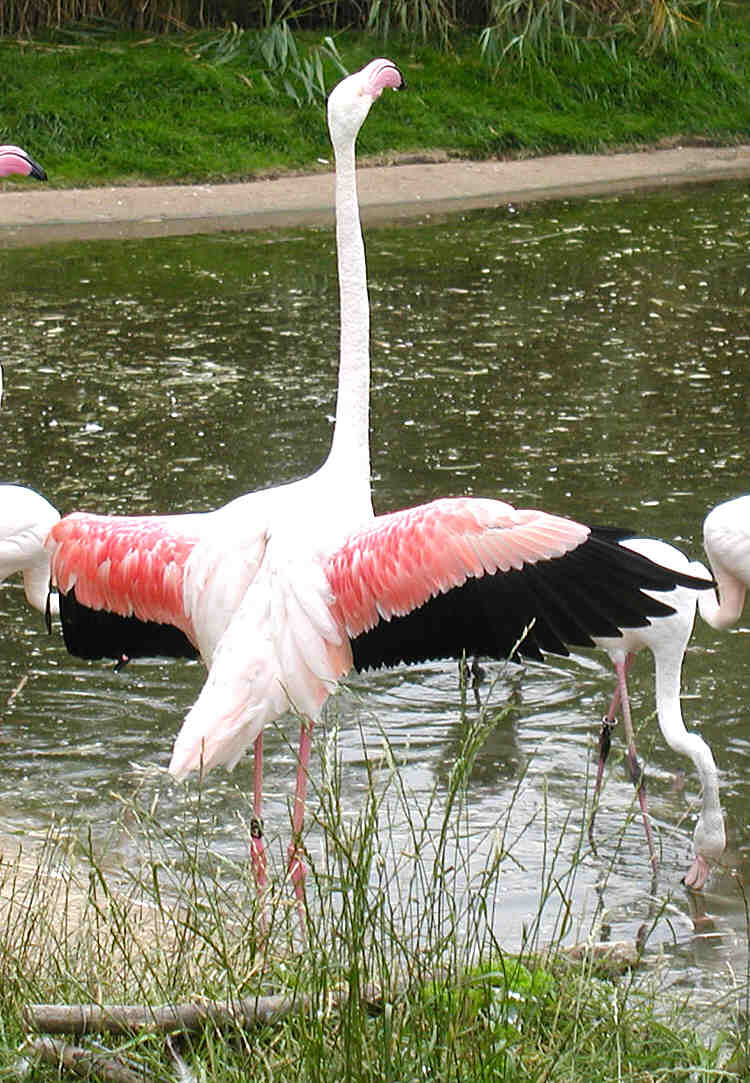
Greater Flamingo at Bristol Zoo, Bristol, England with part of the wing missing.

Removing the pinion joint of a bird stops the growth of the primary feathers, preventing the acceleration required for flight and is analogous to amputating a human hand at the wrist. Pinioning may be done by a veterinarian or by a trained breeder, depending on the country in which the keeper is operating. For example, it is illegal for anyone other than a veterinarian to carry out the procedure in the United Kingdom. It is similar to other forms of modification and surgical procedures of domestically raised animals, such as docking the tail of a dog and declawing on a cat.

Apart from the prevention of flight, there is commonly thought to be little long term negative effect from pinioning if performed correctly and at a young age. However, the animal welfare impact of pinioning is subject to increasing debate. For example, it is now known that the operation, which is often performed without pain relief, is just as painful in young birds as in mature birds, if not more so. Evidence also suggests that pinioning may cause a phantom limb syndrome similar to what is observed in human amputees. For these reasons, this practice has been prohibited in certain regions and is subject to increasing scrutiny.

== Alternatives to pinioning ==
A non-surgical alternative is clipping the flight feathers. This only lasts until feathers are replaced during the moult. However, the flight feathers are only replaced once or twice a year, depending on the species. The process of capturing and clipping can cause considerable distress to birds.

Permanent enclosures designed to prevent accidental egress (escape) of birds remove the need for pinioning.

Keeping birds who through natural adaptation or selective breeding have lost the ability to fly removes the need for pinioning. For example, keeping Indian runner ducks as opposed to wild-type mallard ducks.

== Legal status ==
Pinioning is legally restricted in many countries. In England, if the bird is more than 10 days old, its pinioning may only be performed using anaesthetic and, regardless of the bird's age, the procedure is illegal unless carried out by a veterinarian. It is also illegal to perform on farmed birds. In Austria, pinioning is prohibited based on §5 (Prohibition of cruelty to animals) and §7 (Prohibited interventions performed on animals) of the Animal Protection Act.
