= Kay Mehren =

Veterinarian

- Citizenship: American-Canadian
- Education: University of California-Davis
- Known for: Veterinary Medicine, Zoological Medicine
- Spouse: Peter Mehren
- Awards: Murray E. Fowler Lifetime Achievement Award, American College of Zoological Medicine (ACZM), ACZM Presidential Award for Service to the organization, Canadian Animal Health Consultative Committee Award for Contribution to Animal Health in Canada
- Scientific career
- Fields: Biology, Zoology
- Workplaces: Toronto Zoo

Kay Mehren is an American-Canadian veterinarian, who is the former senior veterinarian of the Toronto Zoo. She can be seen in the television series Zoo Diaries.

== Early life and education ==
Mehren graduated from the University of California-Davis School of Veterinary Medicine in 1965.

== Career ==
When Toronto Zoo opened in 1974, Mehren became its first female veterinarian at the institution, joining Dr. William Rapley.

From 1985 to 2003 Mehren was adjunct professor in the Department of Pathobiology at Guelph University.

In 1982, she became a charter diplomate of the American College of Zoological Medicine (ACZM), involved in developing standards for training, experience, and certification of zoo veterinarians. She was secretary of the ACZM 1983–86, a member of the Credentials Committee 1986–89, and Chair of the Credentials Committee 1989–2004. She received the Presidential Award for Service to ACZM in 2001, and was awarded the Murray E. Fowler Lifetime Achievement Award in 2016.

In 2003 she was given the title veterinarian emeritus by the Toronto Zoo, after almost 30 years as senior veterinarian. She was the first person to be given an emeritus title by the institution. Towards the end of her tenure at the Toronto Zoo, Mehren noted that her job had shifted from pediatrics of baby animals to care of geriatric animals as the zoo population aged over time. After retirement, she and her husband, Peter Mehren, continued to donate to the zoo. She is a Life Member of the Toronto Zoo Foundation.

Mehren was on a sub-committee which developed the Canadian Council on Animal Care's 2010 guidelines on animal care as a member of the Subcommittee on Marine Mammals. Among the organizations she has consulted for on animal health and welfare are: Canadian Animal Health Consultative Committee; National Wildlife Disease Strategy; Canadian Veterinary Medical Association; Ontario Society for the Prevention of Cruelty to Animals; Ontario Ministry of Health; Ontario Animal Care Review Board; the American College of Zoological Medicine; American Association of Zoo Veterinarians; Wildlife Disease Association; Ministry of Natural Resources, Aquatic Research and Development Section; Toronto Zoo Animal Care and Research Committee; and Canadian Council on Animal Care.

== Publications ==
Mehren has worked with numerous captive and wild species and individual animals. She has co-authored numerous papers on veterinary topics. Her scientific contributions include:

- Author or co-author of 25 refereed scientific papers in zoological medicine.
- Author or co-author of 32 scientific papers presented at conferences.
- Author or co-author of 23 non-refereed papers, technical reports, and lay articles.
- Author or co-author of five book chapters on: mycobacterial infections of zoo animals; gout; the Procyonidae; keratoconjuctivitis and pox virus lesions in reindeer; and thyroid diseases and arteriosclerosis in birds.

=== Selected papers ===
- Lair, Stéphane, Ian K. Barker, Kay G. Mehren, and Elizabeth S. Williams. "Epidemiology of neoplasia in captive black-footed ferrets (Mustela nigripes), 1986-1996." Journal of Zoo and Wildlife Medicine (2002): 204–213.
- Black, Sandra R., Ian K. Barker, Kay G. Mehren, Graham J. Crawshaw, Soren Rosendal, Louise Ruhnke, Jan Thorsen, and P. Suzanne Carman. "An epizootic of Mycoplasma ovipneumoniae infection in captive Dall's sheep (Ovis dalli dalli)." Journal of Wildlife Diseases 24, no. 4 (1988): 627–635.
- Cranfield, M. R., I. K. Barker, K. G. Mehren, and W. A. Rapley. "Canine distemper in wild raccoons (Procyon lotor) at the Metropolitan Toronto Zoo." The Canadian Veterinary Journal 25, no. 2 (1984): 63.
- Dubé, Caroline, Kay G. Mehren, Ian K. Barker, Brian L. Peart, and Aru Balachandran. "Retrospective investigation of chronic wasting disease of cervids at the Toronto Zoo, 1973–2003." The Canadian Veterinary Journal 47, no. 12 (2006): 1185.
- Crawshaw, G. J., and K. G. Mehren. "Cryptosporidiosis in zoo and wild animals." In Erkrankungen der Zootiere. Verhandlungsbericht des 29. Internationalen Symposiums über die Erkrankungen der Zootiere von 20. Mai bis 24. Mai 1987 in Cardiff., pp. 353–362. Akademie-Verlag, 1987.
- Duncan, Mary, Graham J. Crawshaw, Kay G. Mehren, Kenneth PH Pritzker, Maria Mendes, and Dale A. Smith. "Multicentric hyperostosis consistent with fluorosis in captive fruit bats (Pteropus giganteus, P. poliocephalus, and Rousettus aegyptiacus)." Journal of Zoo and Wildlife Medicine (1996): 325–338.
- Petric, M., P. J. Middleton, W. A. Rapley, K. G. Mehren, and C. Grant. "A survey of zoo mammals for antibody to rotavirus." Canadian Journal of Comparative Medicine 45, no. 3 (1981): 327.
- Lair, Stéphane, Graham J. Crawshaw, Kay G. Mehren, and Maria A. Perrone. "Diagnosis of hypothyroidism in a western lowland gorilla (Gorilla gorilla gorilla) using human thyroid-stimulating hormone assay." Journal of Zoo and Wildlife Medicine (1999): 537–540.
- Crawshaw, G. J., K. G. Mehren, and S. Black. "Antagonism of xylazine and ketamine/xylazine combinations in exotic species by idazoxan and RX821002." In Proceedings of the Annual Meeting, American Association of Zoo Veterinarians, pp. 1–2. 1986.
