= Veterinary specialty =

List of professional specialties

A veterinary specialist is a veterinarian who specializes in a clinical field of veterinary medicine.

A veterinary specialist may be consulted when an animal's condition requires specialized care above and beyond that which a regular veterinarian can offer. Many veterinary specialists require a referral in order to be seen. After treatment, a veterinary specialist may stay in close contact with the referring veterinarian to provide ongoing treatment suggestions and advice. Veterinary specialists also play an important role in the training and continuing education of veterinary students, nursing staff, and practicing veterinarians. Though variable, specialists may earn up to 2–3 times more than general practice veterinarians.

Admission or entry into a veterinary specialty residency program is highly competitive in the United States and Canada. Most specialties require a 1-year internship or 2 years of clinical practice prior to beginning a residency of 3–4 years' duration. Some veterinarians complete additional specialty internships before being accepted into a residency program. In the United States, most internships and residencies accept applicants through the Veterinary Internship & Residency Matching Program, similar to the National Resident Matching Program for physicians. Most specialties require the resident to produce some academic contribution (often in the form of a scientific publication) in order to qualify to sit the certifying examination. Many specialists are active researchers in their fields of expertise.

== Specialties ==
- Anesthesiology and pain management
- Anatomic pathology
- Animal behavior
- Animal welfare
- Aquatic animal medicine
- Avian medicine
- Bovine medicine
- Canine medicine
- Cardiology
- Clinical pathology
- Clinical pharmacology
- Dentistry
- Dermatology
- Diagnostic imaging
- Equine
- Emergency and critical care
- Honey bee medicine
- Feline medicine
- Veterinary immunology
- Internal medicine
- Laboratory animal medicine
- Microbiology
- Neurology and neurosurgery
- Nutrition
- Oncology (cancer in animals)
- Ophthalmology
- Parasitology
- Porcine medicine
- Poultry medicine
- Preventive medicine
- Radiation oncology
- Reptile and amphibian medicine
- Shelter medicine
- Sports medicine and rehabilitation
- Surgery, including orthopaedics and soft tissue surgery
- Theriogenology
- Toxicology
- Zoological medicine

== American Veterinary Medical Association ==
According to the AVMA, a board-certified veterinary specialist is "a veterinarian who has completed additional training in a specific area of veterinary medicine and has passed an examination that evaluates their knowledge and skills in that specialty area." As of 2023, the AVMA recorded 16,291 total active board-certified specialists.

As of 2024, the AVMA recognizes 46 distinct veterinary specialties from 22 veterinary specialty organizations, including the American College of Veterinary Anesthesia and Analgesia, American College of Animal Welfare, American College of Veterinary Surgeons, and American College of Zoological Medicine.

== European Board of Veterinary Specialization ==
The European Board of Veterinary Specialization recognizes the following 23 veterinary specialty organizations:

- European College of Zoological Medicine
- European College of Animal Reproduction
- European College of Bovine Health Management
- European College of Equine Internal Medicine
- European College of Laboratory Animal Medicine
- European College of Porcine Health Management
- European College of Poultry Veterinary Medicine
- European College of Small Ruminant Health Management
- European College of Veterinary Anaesthesia and Analgesia
- European College of Animal Welfare and Behavioural Medicine
- European College of Veterinary Comparative Nutrition
- European College of Veterinary Clinical Pathology
- European College of Veterinary Dermatology
- European College of Veterinary Diagnostic Imaging
- European College of Veterinary Internal Medicine - Companion Animals
- European College of Veterinary Neurology
- European College of Veterinary Ophthalmologists
- European College of Veterinary Pathology
- European College of Veterinary Public Health
- European College of Veterinary Pharmacology and Toxicology
- European College of Veterinary Surgeons
- European Veterinary Dentistry College
- European Veterinary Parasitology College

== International Board of Veterinary Specialisation and other boards ==
- International Veterinary Forensic Sciences Association
- Vet Food Agro Diagnostics
- Honey Bee Veterinary Consortium
- Pig Veterinarian Society

== See also ==
- Medical specialist
- List of professional designations in the United States
