= Paraveterinary workers in New Zealand =

Veterinary nurses in New Zealand are represented by the New Zealand Veterinary Nursing Association (NZVNA). Veterinary nurses are professionals in their own right, and as such, not deemed a paraprofessional. Veterinary nursing assistants are paraprofessionals, working alongside veterinary nurses in animal health and welfare.

== Nursing ==
Qualifications for veterinary nursing in New Zealand underwent a review in 2014/15.

The new qualification being taught from 2016 are:

- Certificate in Animal Technology - Veterinary Nursing Assistant
- Diploma in Veterinary Nursing.

The Certificate represents one year of formal training, while the Diploma represents an additional one year with the Certificate (or its equivalent) as a prerequisite. Other available entry-level certificates include the Certificate in Animal Care and the Certificate in Rural Animal Technology.

Pre-2016; Veterinary nurses currently hold either of the pre-2016 qualifications:

- National Certificate in Veterinary Nursing
- Diploma in Veterinary Nursing.

=== Registration ===
Veterinary nurses in New Zealand are not currently required to be registered with the government but voluntary registration was initiated in 2016.

Veterinary nursing in New Zealand is represented by the New Zealand Veterinary Nursing Association (NZVNA).

== Technicians ==
In 2009, Massey University started a new degree - the Bachelor of Veterinary Technology. It is a three year degree graduating its first class in 2011. It is intended to prepare graduates for roles such as:

- Clinic supervisors (includes farm animal, equine and companion animal practice)
- Animal behaviour advisors
- Biomedical research technologists
- Biosecurity officers
- Health technologists in zoos, animal control or humane societies
- Herd health technologists
- Research animal technologists
