= Université de Montréal Faculty of Veterinary Medicine =

Veterinary medical school in Quebec, Canada

Coordinates: 45°37′10″N 72°57′52″W

- Type: Public Faculty of Veterinary Medicine
- Established: 1969; 57 years ago
- Location: Montreal, Quebec, Canada
- Website: www.fmv.umontreal.ca

The Faculty of Veterinary Medicine (French: Faculté de médecine vétérinaire) at Université de Montréal is one of five veterinary medical schools in Canada. It is the only French-language veterinary college in North America. It is located in Saint-Hyacinthe, Quebec near Montreal. It holds a full accreditation of the American Veterinary Medical Association (AVMA).

== History ==
The veterinary college was located in Oka, Quebec before moving to Saint-Hyacinthe in 1947. In Oka, the veterinary college formed part of an agricultural-veterinary educational centre operated by the Trappists. This centre was financed by the Quebec Department of Agriculture.

The Centre became the direct responsibility of the Québec Department of Agriculture from 1947 to 1969. In 1969, the Centre became a Université de Montréal faculty. Considerable development in staff and facilities has taken place.

== Studies ==
Doctorate of Veterinary Medicine (438 students)

- 96 students admitted / year
- 5-year program (4 years of theory, 1 year of practical training)
- Program focused on skills
- Offered exclusively by the FMV in Quebec
- Very high quota (10 applications / admission)
- Feminization: More than 80% of female students

HIGHER EDUCATION

Internship (IPSAV) (28 students, 1-year program)

- Pet medicine
- Bovine medicine
- Equine medicine
- Porcine medicine
- Theriogenology
- Zoo and exotic pet medicine

Residency (33 students, 3-year program)

- Anesthesiology
- Laboratory animals
- Surgery
- Animal behavior
- Dentistry
- Dermatology
- Medical imagery
- Internal medicine
- Population medicine
- Zoological medicine
- Veterinary microbiology
- Neurology
- Ophthalmology
- Veterinary pathology
- Clinical pathology
- Theriogenology
- Emergency medicine and intensive care

Masters in Veterinary Science (80 students, 2-year program)

- Biomedicine
- Epidemiology
- Veterinary hygiene and food safety
- Medicine of laboratory animals
- Microbiology
- Pathology
- Pharmacology
- Reproduction
- Clinical science

Ph.D. in Veterinary Science (45 students, 3-year program)

- Epidemiology
- Microbiology
- Pathology
- Pharmacology
- Reproduction

Post doctorate studies (14 students)

Microprograms (32 students)

- Public health
- Companion animals

== Research ==
Since 1972, the Faculty of Veterinary Medicine has been home to the Centre de Recherche en Reproduction Animale (CRRA) [Animal Reproduction Research Centre], a facility dedicated to the understanding of reproductive issues in large domestic animals (livestock).

Centres and Research Groups

- CRRF (Reproduction and Fertility Research Center): http://www.medvet.umontreal.ca/CRRA/index.php/en/
- DSA R&D (Herd Health Management)
- GRAC (Companion Animal Research Group)
- GREMEQ (Equine Research)
- GREMIP (Research Group on Infectious Diseases in Production Animals: http://www.medvet.umontreal.ca/gremip/index.php/en/
- GREPAQ (Animal pharmacology research group of Quebec)
- GRESA (Food Safety Research Group)
- GREZOSP (Research Group on Epidemiology of Zoonoses and Public Health)
- EcL (Escherichia coli Laboratory): http://www.ecl-lab.com/en/

Research Chairs

- Poultry (philanthropic chair)
- Research Chair in Meat Safety (CRSNG Industrial Chair)

Research networks

- CQSAS (Québec Centre for Wild Animal Health)
- CRIPA (Swine and poultry infectious diseases research center)
- Bovine Mastitis (Canadian Bovine Mastitis and Milk Quality Research Network)
- RQR (Research Network on Reproduction)

Bioevaluation centers

- Animal houses
- Poultry research center
- Agro environmental platform REPA

== See also ==
- Université de Montréal

Fundraising Campaign
