= European College of Veterinary Anaesthesia and Analgesia =

Specialist veterinary college

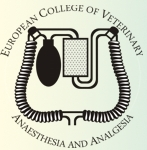
- Abbreviation: ECVAA
- Established: January 1, 1995; 31 years ago
- Website: www.ecvaa.org

The European College of Veterinary Anesthesia and Analgesia (ECVAA) is one of 25 veterinary specialist colleges recognized by the European Board of Veterinary Specialization, comprising more than 35 distinct specialties.

== History ==
ECVA was inaugurated on 1 January 1995 and was formally registered in the Netherlands on May 22, 1997 as a non-profit organization. Application for de facto recognition was possible until 31 December 1997. During this period 44 de facto specialists were appointed. The first exam took place in 1997.

In 2003 ECVA acquired full recognition-status by the European Board of Veterinary Specialization (EBVS) and has continued to grow since then. The name of the College was changed to the European College of Veterinary Anesthesia and Analgesia (ECVAA) in 2007.

== Membership ==
In order to become an EBVS European Specialist in Veterinary Anesthesia and Analgesia, veterinarians need to fulfil the following requirements: (1) have worked as a veterinarian in general practice for two years or have completed a rotating internship, which covers different specialties for at least one year, (2) have successfully completed a three year specialized postgraduate training programme in anesthesia, analgesia and intensive care coordinated by an ECVAA Diplomate, (3) have published two peer-reviewed articles in internationally recognized scientific journals and submitted a case log and two case reports and (4) have successfully passed the written and practical/oral parts of the qualifying examinations.

Diplomates of the European Colleges have to pass a re-validation process every five years to retain the European Specialist title. As of March 2020, there have been 227 members recognized ECVAA Diplomates. The current president is Matthew Gurney.

== Function ==
ECVAA and the Association of Veterinary Anesthetists, of which all Diplomates of ECVAA are members are the main scientific organizations consulted by EU and national authorities for their expert opinion on matters related to veterinary anesthesia and analgesia, protection of animals used for experimental and other scientific purposes etc.

ECVAA contributes substantially to animal welfare, not only by alleviating pain and stress of the animals, but also by assisting Animal Welfare Associations in various ways. Diplomates have also been consulted to provide specialist opinion during the registration process of veterinary drugs in the National and European Medicines Agencies.

== Past and current presidents ==
| Years | President |
|---|---|
| 1995-1999 | Polly Taylor |
| 1999-2002 | Frank Gasthuys |
| 2002-2005 | Dimitris Raptopoulos |
| 2005-2008 | Kathy Clarke |
| 2008-2011 | Yves Moens |
| 2011-2014 | Klaus Otto |
| 2014-2017 | Federico Corletto |
| 2017-2020 | Lynne Hughes |
| 2020-2023 | Matthew Gurney |
| 2023-Present | Ian Self |

== See also ==
- American College of Veterinary Anesthesia and Analgesia
