= Evidence-Based Veterinary Medicine Association =

Non-profit organization

The Evidence-Based Veterinary Medicine Association (EBVMA) is an international, non-profit (501(c)(3)) professional organization with the mission of better organizing the emerging veterinary research, training, and practice of evidence-based veterinary medicine (EBVM)—the formal strategy to integrate the results of the best critically-designed and statistically-evaluated research available with clinical expertise and the unique needs or wishes of each client in clinical practice. EBVM draws from and parallels the evidence-based medicine movement in human medicine.

The association provides benefits for members including a listserv for discussion of relevant topics, and free access to the most comprehensive veterinary literature database, CABI's VetMed Resource, and to point-of-care information tool, Vetlexicon. Free-to-access resources on the EBVMA website include podcasts on aspects of EBVM, and links to other resources pertinent to EBVM.

In addition to the core EBVM topics of clinical-research design, how to search the literature for published research, and how veterinarians can evaluate published research studies or review articles in order to assess the quality of their findings and conclusions, the EBVMA is interested in all areas of the 'information milieu' within which veterinary medicine, and EBVM, are practiced. These include:

- The dissemination of information, and of misinformation and disinformation, within veterinary medicine.
- Knowledge translation - the process by which research findings reach, and become used by the professional veterinary community of practice.
- The evidence underlying new drugs, supplements and diagnostic or therapeutic devices or practises.
- Clinical decision making.
- Understanding errors in diagnostic and treatment reasoning.
- Interpretation of diagnostic and screening tests.
- Effects of cognitive biases within veterinary medicine.
- Critical thinking within veterinary medicine.
- Development of infrastructure supporting research synthesis and translation of research in veterinary medicine.
- Veterinary meta-research.

== History ==
An association dedicated to EBVM was proposed at the first Symposium on EBVM, held at Mississippi State University in May 2004. The EBVMA was formally founded in June 2006, during the second Symposium on EBVM, and incorporated as a non-profit organisation shortly thereafter. The first president was veterinarian Bob Larson of the College of Veterinary Medicine, Kansas State University.

Initially membership was dominated by academic veterinarians based in university veterinary schools, but over the years membership expanded to include private-practice veterinarians, veterinary-school librarians, veterinary technicians/nurses, veterinarians working in industry, regulatory agencies and charities, and veterinary students.

== Organization ==
The EBVMA is run by a volunteer Board of Directors consisting of a president, president-elect, immediate past president, executive secretary, treasurer, the chair of web presence committee, and an Executive Committee composed of six regional directors. The current president is internist Gary Block, of Ocean State Veterinary Specialists, Rhode Island.

== Activities ==
Members of the Association carry out research and writing in areas related to EBVM, and publish occasional comment on matters that arise within the field of veterinary medicine. The EBVMA has produced podcasts about aspects of EBVM, and are producing a series of webinars in association with the Veterinary Information Network discussing the evidence-base relevant to clinical questions commonly-asked by companion animal vets. Members contribute an article to US veterinary magazine Veterinary Practice News every other month. The EBVMA runs periodic symposia on EBVM.
