= Student American Veterinary Medical Association =

North American nonprofit organization

The Student American Veterinary Medical Association (SAVMA) is a national association of student chapters of the American Veterinary Medical Association (AVMA) at schools and colleges of veterinary medicine in the United States, Canada and the Caribbean. SAVMA acts as a single national voice for veterinary students in accordance with the policies and goals of the AVMA, coordinates AVMA student chapter activities, facilitates the exchange of information, and represents the interests of student veterinarians within AVMA, the veterinary profession and in the political and legislative arenas nationally.

As of 2007, SAVMA had roughly 10,000 members in 29 chapters.

== History ==
In 1966, representatives of student chapters of the AVMA attending the AVMA Convention proposed forming a national organization under the aegis of the AVMA. The AVMA agreed to form a committee of students, practicing veterinarians and AVMA staff to study the idea.

In early 1969, frustrated by the delay at the national level, the student AVMA chapter at the University of California, Davis formed a committee which drafted a resolution and constitution for the new national student organization. In May 1969, the AVMA House of Delegates approved the formation of the National Conference of Student Chapters of the AVMA (NCSCAVMA). The organization's goals mirror those of the AVMA.

In 1972, the organization changed its name to the Student American Veterinary Medical Association.

== Structure ==
SAVMA membership is limited to student chapters of the AVMA at accredited veterinary medical schools in the U.S. and Canada. Associate member status is conferred to foreign veterinary medical schools.

SAVMA is governed by a House of Delegates (HOD). Each member chapter is permitted to two delegates to the HOD. The HOD meets each spring and summer. It elects officers, and sets policy within the boundaries established by the AVMA constitution and policies. The HOD has 11 committees that meet after the conclusion of the business meeting of the HOD. The committees are:

- Animal Welfare–Human Animal Bond
- Communications
- Economics, Finance and Management
- Education and Professional Development
- Emerging Issues
- Government Affairs
- International Veterinary Student Relations
- Multicultural Student Outreach
- Native American Project
- Symposium
- Vet Gazette

The HOD meeting in the spring is held in conjunction with the SAVMA Symposium, an educational and professional development conference. The HOD meeting in the summer is held in conjunction with the AVMA Annual Meeting.

The HOD elects eight national officers. The officers include a president, secretary, treasurer, editor, International Exchange officer, Information Technology officer, Veterinary Economics Officer, and The Vet Gazette Editor. The officers and officers-elect oversee the day-to-day functioning of SAVMA.

The officers and officers-elect—along with the past-president, past-secretary, past-treasurer, AVMA Liaison, and AVMA Advisor to SAVMA—comprise the Executive Committee. The Executive Committee is the governing body of SAVMA between meetings of the HOD.

== Publications and awards ==
SAVMA publishes Vet Gazette, which is the organization's official journal. It is published four times a year. A different SAVMA chapter is given publication duties each year.

SAVMA also publishes Intervet, an online, members-only journal available on the AVMA website.

Each year, SAVMA also bestows the Teaching Excellence Awards. The award is given two veterinary faculty for excellence in instruction.
