= Kansas State University College of Veterinary Medicine =

Coordinates: 39.19904°N 96.58435°W

- Manhattan, Kansas; United States

Information
- Type: Public
- Established: 1905
- Head teacher: Bonnie Rush
- Color: Royal purple
- USNWR ranking: 14 (2017)
- Annual tuition: $19,623 (Kansas resident) $33,067 (non-resident)
- Feeder schools: Kansas State University
- Website: vet.k-state.edu

Kansas State University's College of Veterinary Medicine was established in 1905.

== History ==
Officially established in 1905, the first reference to veterinary medicine at Kansas State was in 1862. Starting in 1886, students enrolled in agriculture were offered animal health courses but not for any type of veterinary degree credit. The 1905 establishment date refers to when the Doctor of Veterinary Medicine degree was created.

Originally known as the Department of Veterinary Medicine, a part of the School of Agriculture; it became the Division of Veterinary Medicine in 1919 after separating from the School of Agriculture and in 1943, the Division was changed to School. In 1963, when Kansas State College became Kansas State University, the Veterinary Medicine program was designated a college.

Originally, 15 units of high school work (equivalent to graduation) were required for admission. Effective in 1932, 32 hours of college work were required to be eligible for the professional program and by the 1949-50 academic year, 68 hours (two years) of pre-veterinary medical work were required. Through the years, the pre-professional requirements have changed to reflect the demands of the professional curriculum.
