= American College of Veterinary Surgeons =

Professional association

- Abbreviation: ACVS
- Established: 1965; 61 years ago
- Website: acvs.org

The American College of Veterinary Surgeons (ACVS) is the specialty board that defines the standards of surgical excellence for the field of veterinary medicine, promotes advancements in veterinary surgery, and provides the latest in veterinary surgical educational programs. The ACVS is responsible for overseeing the training, examination, and certification of board-certified veterinary surgeons.

== About the ACVS ==
The college was founded in 1965 and is recognized by the American Veterinary Medical Association (AVMA) as a veterinary specialty organization. As of 2025, there were 2,667 ACVS board-certified veterinarians (Diplomates). Approximately 70 veterinarians earn their Diplomate credentials every year. More than 60 percent of ACVS Diplomates operate in private and specialty practices that accept cases on a referral basis from primary care practitioners. The remainder are primarily employed by academic institutions and industry where they teach, conduct research, practice in teaching hospitals, and participate in the development of new products and treatments which improve the quality of veterinary and human health care.

== Board Certification ==
The term "ACVS Diplomate" refers to a veterinarian who has been board certified in veterinary surgery. A veterinarian who has successfully completed the certification requirements of the ACVS is known as a Diplomate of the American College of Veterinary Surgeons and may be called a specialist in veterinary surgery.

All licensed veterinarians may perform surgery as part of their veterinary practice. Graduates from veterinary colleges accredited by the AVMA are trained in the fundamentals of veterinary medicine and surgery. Much of the practical, hands-on experience is then gained after graduation. As with any profession, the level of training and mastery of techniques varies with each individual. The knowledge and skills needed to perform procedures not taught or mastered during the typical veterinary education may be acquired by independent study and practice, attending continuing education, or completing a residency program in a field of specialty practice.

There are several specialty colleges under the umbrella of the AVMA. The goal of specialty colleges is to create individuals with more expertise in defined areas of veterinary medicine. Specialty colleges ensure and verify that all members meet requirements in regards to training, knowledge, and skill. A Diplomate of the American College of Veterinary Surgeons has completed an approved surgical training program (typically a 3-year residency), met specific training and caseload requirements, performed research and had their findings published, completed credentialing by the ACVS, and passed rigorous examination. After completion of these requirements and certification as a Diplomate of the ACVS a veterinarian can be considered a veterinary surgical specialist.

== Publications ==
Veterinary Surgery, the college's official scientific journal, is published on a monthly basis by Wiley Interscience. The ACVS Foundation, in collaboration with Wiley-Blackwell, has published a book series entitled Advances in Veterinary Surgery.
