= Michigan Veterinary Medical Association =

The Michigan Veterinary Medical Association (MVMA) is a not-for-profit association representing more than 2300 Michigan veterinarians working in private and corporate practice, government, industry, educational institutions, and uniformed services. MVMA has four strategic priorities: education, advocacy, resources, and community.

One of the primary sources of continuing education for veterinarians located in the State of Michigan, the MVMA develops and maintains educational programming for DVMs, LVTs, and other members of the veterinary team. In addition to providing information resources and discounts on personal and professional services, the MVMA advocates for veterinary and animal welfare legislation.

The MVMA publishes The Michigan Veterinarian and distributes a monthly e-newsletter.

== History ==
Founded in 1883, the association, through a variety of educational, outreach and advocacy activities, works to advance member development; promote the professional and scientific standards or veterinary medicine; improve the business and work environment for veterinarians; and to serve as the public voice for veterinary medicine in Michigan. MVMA is at the forefront of the effort to educate veterinarians to serve as front-line defenders of the public against zoonotic diseases, which can be transmitted from animals to humans, in order to play a role in maintaining both animal and human health.

== Involvement in One Health ==
Due to the increased importance of the human-animal bond, the MVMA plays an important role in maintaining a network of experts skilled in both public health and food animal monitoring and protection. Through its One Health Committee, the MVMA seeks to educate veterinary professionals and the public on the interconnected nature of animal, human, and environmental health -- i.e. One Health.

The MVMA has developed the Michigan State Animal Response Team (MSART); charged with facilitating animal evacuation and care in emergency situations, this is statewide collaborative effort involving a diverse group of qualified veterinarians and other animal welfare experts.
