= American College of Zoological Medicine =

US-based professional organization

- Formation: 1983; 43 years ago
- Coordinates: 41.831633°N 87.832692°W
- Website: aczm.org

American College of Zoological Medicine (ACZM) was established in 1983 as an international specialty organization of veterinarians with special expertise in zoological medicine.

The ACZM was established to encourage medical research that benefits wild animals. Also it was established to advance competency and scientific progress in zoological medicine, integrate the principles of ecology, conservation, and veterinary medicine as it applies to wild animals within natural and artificial environments. It sets standards for post-doctoral training and experience and to certify veterinarians as specialists in zoological medicine through comprehensive examination.

ACZM became recognized by the American Veterinary Medical Association, American Board of Veterinary Specialists, and American Association of Zoo Veterinarians.

The organization hands out the Murray E. Fowler Lifetime Achievement Award. Past recipients have included Dr. Kay Mehren of the Toronto Zoo.
