= Wijaya Kusuma University, Surabaya =

University in Surabaya, East Java, Indonesia

Coordinates: 7.282438432331107°S 112.7115639182662°E

- Universitas Wijaya Kusuma Surabaya
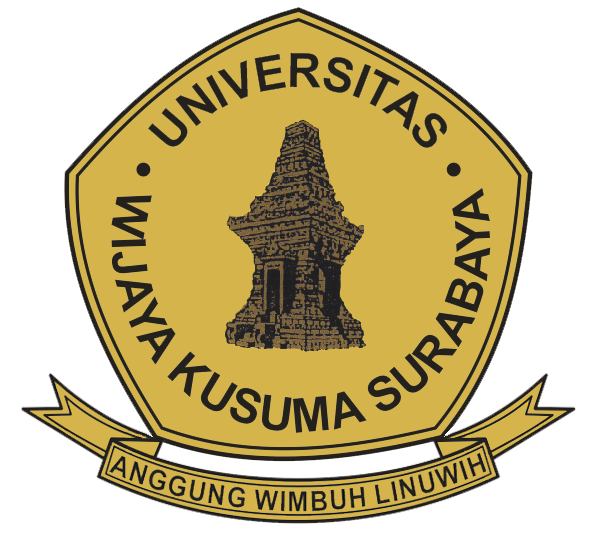
- Type: Private
- Established: June 19, 1980
- President: Prof. Dr. Widodo Ario Kentjono, Sp. THT-KL(K), FICS
- Academic staff: 569
- Location: Surabaya, Indonesia
- Campus: Urban
- Colors: yellow
- Website: uwks.ac.id

Wijaya Kusuma University, Surabaya (Indonesian: Universitas Wijaya Kusuma Surabaya) or abbreviated UWKS, is a private university located in Surabaya, Indonesia. The university was established in 1980 by Soenandar Projosoedarmo, Blegoh Soemarto, and Moch. Said. This university has two programs, undergraduate and graduate programs, as well as, eight faculties. UWKS is owned by the Wijaya Kusuma Foundation.

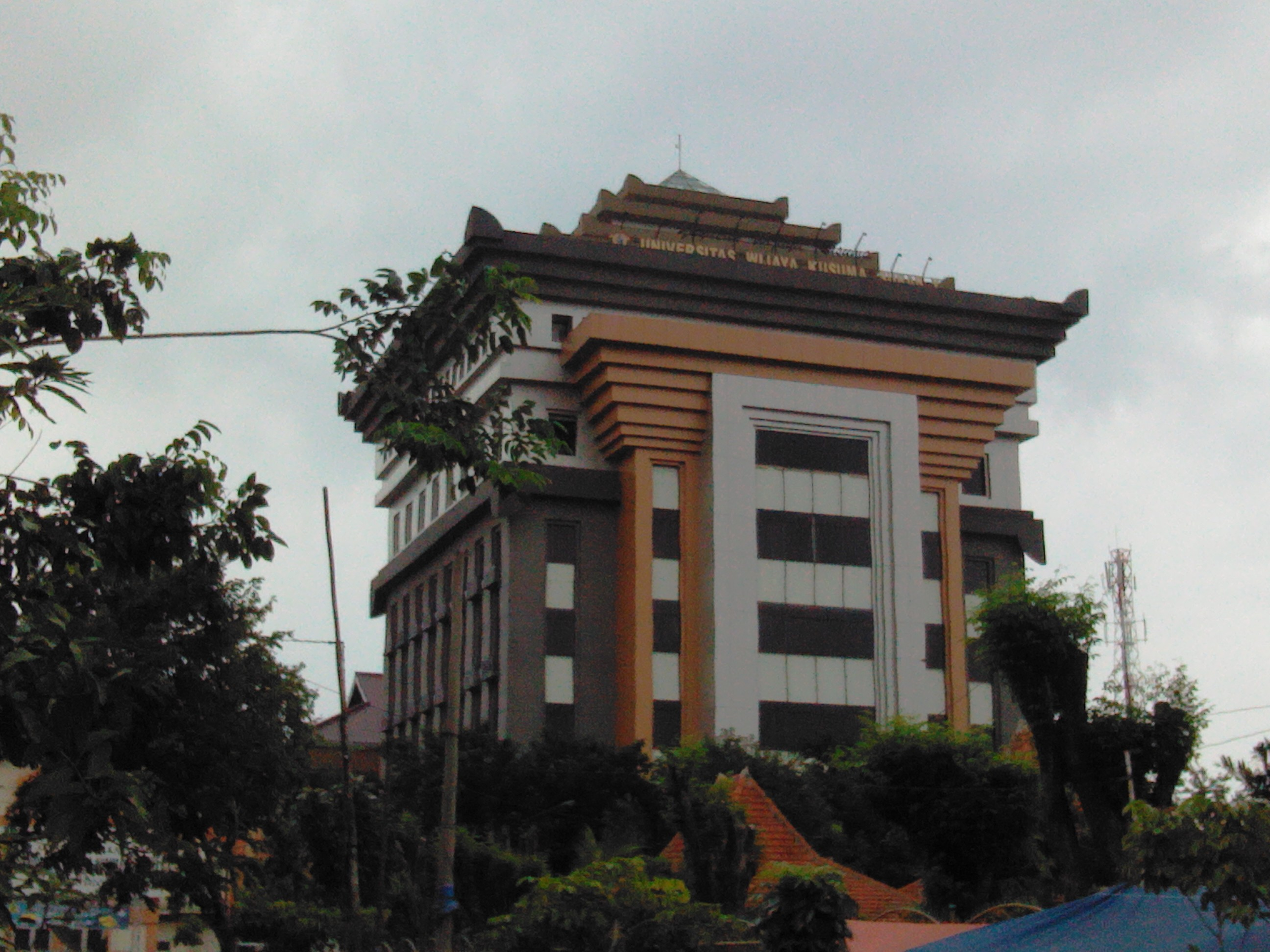
The building of Faculty of Medicine Wijaya Kusuma Surabaya University

== Faculties ==
- Faculty of Agriculture
  - Undergraduate Program of Agrotechnology
  - Undergraduate Program of Agrobusiness
- Faculty of Engineering
  - Undergraduate Program of Civil Engineering
  - Undergraduate Program of Information Technology
  - Undergraduate Program of Food Industry
- Faculty of Economics
  - Undergraduate Program of Economic Development
  - Undergraduate Program of Management
  - Undergraduate Program of Accounting
- Faculty of Medicine
- Faculty of Law
- Faculty of Political Science
  - Undergraduate Program of Sociology
  - Undergraduate Program of Political Studies
  - Undergraduate Program of Social Welfare
  - Undergraduate Program of Library Science
- Faculty of Education and Teacher Training
  - Undergraduate Program of Indonesian Studies
  - Undergraduate Program of English Studies
  - Undergraduate Program of Mathematics
  - Undergraduate Program of Biology
  - Undergraduate Program of Elementary Education
  - Professional Teacher Education Program
- Faculty of Veterinary Medicine
- Graduate School of Law
- Graduate School of Accounting
- Graduate School of Agribusiness
- Graduate School of Political Science
