= Iran Veterinary Organization =

- Abbreviation: IVO
- Formation: 1925; 100 years ago in Tehran, Tehran, Iran
- Founder: Mostafa GholiKhan Bayat
- Type: Governmental organization
- Leader: Mojtaba Norouzi
- Website: www.ivo.ir

Iran Veterinary Organization is tasked with protecting the health of animals, especially domestic animals. The organization was created in 1925, after World War I, following an outbreak of rinderpest.

== Formation ==
The National Consultative Assembly approved the formation of a veterinary organization in 1925, under the supervision of the Pasteur Institute. Initially, the organization had only 22 employees. The first chairman was Dr. Abdollah Hamedi.
