= Avian veterinarian =

Veterinarian that specializes in birds

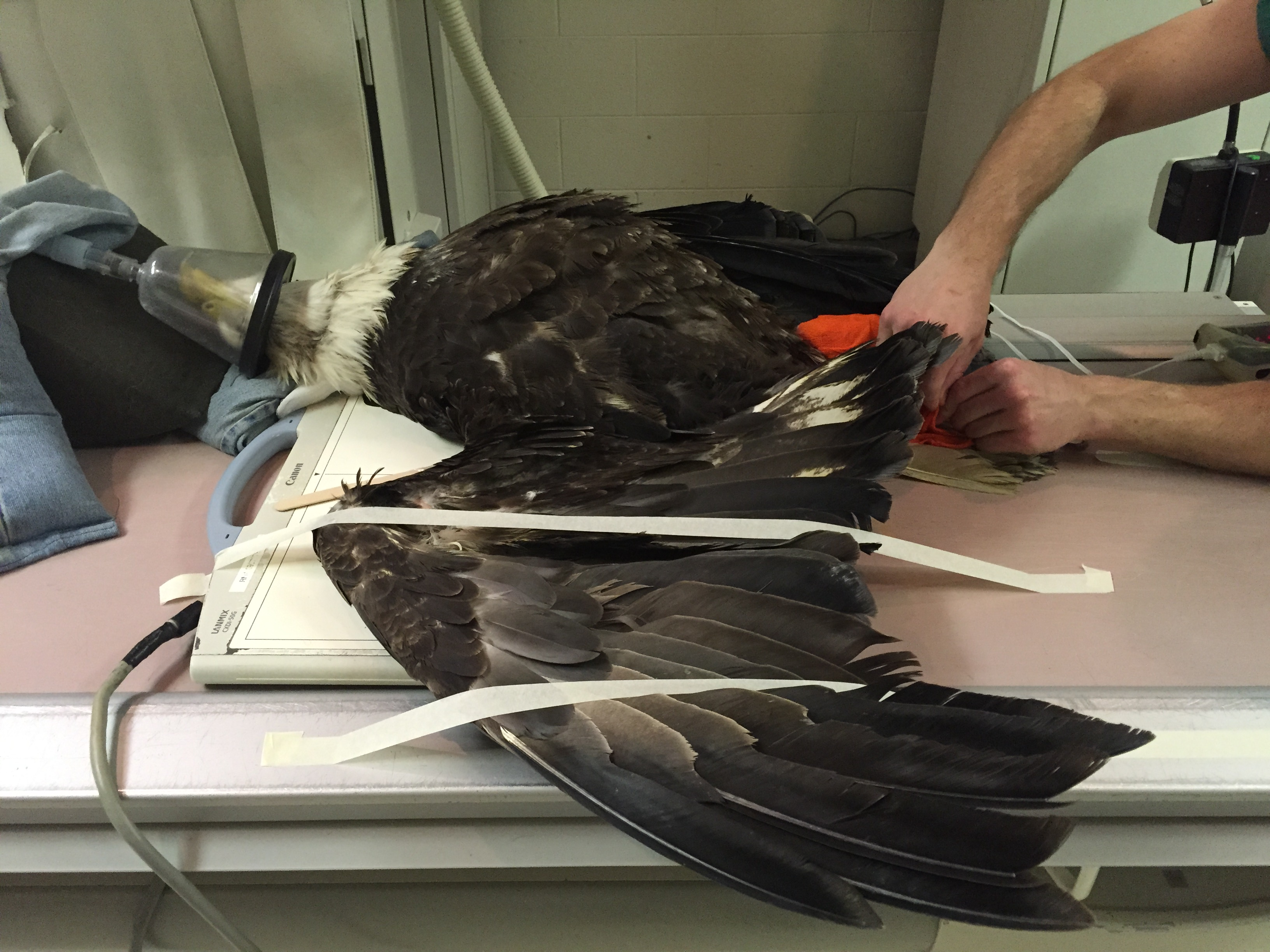
A wounded bald eagle receiving treatment while under general anesthesia

An avian veterinarian is a veterinarian who specializes in treating birds. All veterinarians, upon first qualification from a certified veterinary college, may treat any species. Additional training is required for qualification to become a recognized specialist in the care of birds.

In the United States, a veterinarian can specialize in avian medicine and surgery via post-graduate training through the American Board of Veterinary Practitioners and become a Diplomate of the American Board of Veterinary Practitioners (Avian Practice). Avian veterinarians can become members of the Association of Avian Veterinarians for additional education opportunities including a journal and an annual conference.

In Europe, veterinarians become recognized as avian specialists by qualifying as a Diplomate of the European College of Zoological Medicine (Avian), and in Australia and New Zealand by qualifying as a Member or Fellow of the Australian and New Zealand College of Veterinary Scientists.

== History ==
=== Antiquity to Middle Ages ===
The earliest traces of care for birds can be found in Ancient China. Writings dating back to 4000 BC record the use of herbs in the treatments of humans and animals. The writings concerning animals were mainly focused on horses, but also details on care for other animals, especially agricultural animals were also included. There were also mentions from the Eastern Zhou Dynasty on surgery of birds, with mentions of castration of food animals such as cockerels.

Another instance of ancient bird medicine can be found in Ancient Egypt. Egypt hieroglyphics from 3500BC indicated that domestic animals were heavily present in the lives of Ancient Egyptians. The first written veterinary record from Ancient Egypt is provided by the Kahun Veterinary Papyrus, which discusses diagnosis and treatment for domestic animals and fishes.

During the Middle Ages, medical care of animals was into the hands of professions such as farriers and herdsmen. Treatment of animals during this time was still focused on horses.

=== Veterinarian practice in the 1700s to late 1800s ===
The need for a science-based animal doctors was realised when there was a wave of deadly animal diseases spread during the 18th century. The first veterinarian school was established in established in Lyon France in 1761 by Claude Bourgelat, a horseman and attorney. Other European regions followed suite, with veterinarian schools being set up in Sweden, Germany, Denmark and Austria. In 1844, Great Britain established the Royal College of Veterinary Surgeons. The curriculum of many of these early veterinarian school focused on horses but works such as Handbuch der Vergleichenden Anatomie der Haustierie had a chapter for information regarding birds.

One type of avian veterinary practice that started to show up in the 1700s was the role of the surgeon-farrier. A surgeon-farrier is a person who were often physicians, surgeons or apothecaries with a strong interest in animals. One prominent surgeon-farrier is John Hunter, who became a leading scholar in the field of comparative anatomy. Hunter’s works covered a range of birds from sparrows to ostriches.

Another development in avian medicine during the 1700s would be the treatment of parasites. In 1797, Dr Andrew Wiesenthall wrote a letter to the Medical and Physical Journal about the parasite gapeworm. Dr Wisenthall found success in removing worms from the trachea of poultry that displayed difficulty breathing and could have suffocated to death. Dr Wiesenthall reportedly “removed parasites by twisting a feather, stripped off barbs into the trachea and withdrawing the feather”, the worms are attached to the feather. This form of treatment remained relevant for over a century. In 1883, D.H walker identified the earthworm as the gapeworm’s intermediate host through a series of experiments.

=== Poultry medicine ===
One of the more recent but rapidly developing areas of avian medicine is in poultry medicine. Even through the early 1900s, poultry medicine was poorly understood. One example was the definition of the term “pip”. Diseases and Enemies of Poultry, published in during this period, defined pip as “discharge from nose, mouth, swelling of eyelids, depression of spirits, head drawn down and feathers ruffled.” The modern definition of pip refers to the bird’s tongue dying off due to respiratory issues, which demonstrated the lack of understanding in the early 1900.

The lack of understanding during the early 1900s led to development of several homebrew treatments for avian-related illnesses. Homebrews such as milk, buttermilk, and sour milk were used to treat digestive issues. Sodium bicarbonates were also used as a “flush” to control a wide variety of avian illnesses at the time. Copper sulfate was used as a remedy for intestinal issues.

The need for science-based poultry medicine in the United States arise during the 1920s to 1940s. There was a significant increase in the growth of the poultry industry during this period, and this led to increased population density, increased infection and mortality rates. This led to the demand to reduce mortality rates. Science-based research on poultry diseases started in US land-grant universities and the Bureau of Animal Industry of the Department of Agriculture. One of the leading figures of the time was L.D Bushnell, who was the head of Kansas State College of Agriculture’s department of bacteriology, which had a division that specialised in poultry bacteriology.

Poultry veterinarians started to appear during the 1930s. The field of poultry medicine continued to progress rapidly in the areas of breeding, nutrition, understanding and management of diseases. The first edition of the Diseases of Poultry book was published in 1943. The Diseases of Poultry book offers a complete and definitive reference to all aspects of poultry diseases and the book is currently in its 14th edition. To date, all veterinary schools in the require courses in poultry diseases.

=== Pet care ===
By the early 19th to 20th century, birds were the most popular indoor pet in the United States. Solitary caged birds were common, but families with higher status often kept a variety of birds. During this time, if the birds were sick, most owners attempted self-care instead of seeking professional help. Veterinarians at the time were not interested in non-agricultural related animals, which led to bird owners seeking help from places such as pet shops if professional help is required. Pet shops and bird dealers provided proprietary medicine, prescriptions and even procedures if required.

A major figure in the advancement of pet bird care in the 20th century was Robert Franklin Stroud. In order to understand anatomy and disease transmission, Stroud performed research on his birds. When his birds fell ill, Strout attempted to nurse them back to health. If the birds died, Stroud performed necropsies on the dead birds. The material he had available at the time did not explain the problems he encountered, and Strout tried to read as many books as possible on chemistry, bacteriology and medicine to educate himself.

Strout had published several written works in the field of pet bird care. 2 of his notable works are Diseases of Canaries, published in 1933 and Digest on the Diseases of Birds in 1943. Both texts are still available to this date. Stroud’s Digest helped to provide a comprehensive treatise on avian medicine that is geared towards canaries and other pet birds that also had information for the others such as pet dealers and zoologists.

=== Creation of specialised institutions ===
After World War II, specialised veterinary groups with advance training started to appear. In the United States, the American Veterinary Medical Association recognised the American Board of Poultry Veterinarians and American College of Zoological Medicine in 1991. The American Board of Veterinarian Practitioners began avian board certification in 1993. In Europe, the European college of Avian Medicine and Surgery (ECAMS) was founded in 2003 and became a fully functional college in 2005. ECAMS was expanded in 2007 to become the European College of Zoological Medicine, which included avian specialisation.

== See also ==
- Veterinary specialties
- Well-bird exam
