= Veterinary anesthesia =

Anesthesia performed on non-human animals

A dog put under anesthesia for preventative surgery on its stomach

Veterinary anesthesia is a specialization in the veterinary medicine field dedicated to the proper administration of anesthetic agents to non-human animals to control their consciousness during procedures. A veterinarian or a Registered Veterinary Technician administers these drugs to minimize stress, destructive behavior, and the threat of injury to both the patient and the doctor. The duration of the anesthesia process goes from the time before an animal leaves for the visit to the time after the animal reaches home after the visit, meaning it includes care from both the owner and the veterinary staff. Generally, anesthesia is used for a wider range of circumstances in animals than in people not only due to their inability to cooperate with certain diagnostic or therapeutic procedures, but also due to their species, breed, size, and corresponding anatomy. Veterinary anesthesia includes anesthesia of the major species: dogs, cats, horses, cattle, sheep, goats, and pigs, as well as all other animals requiring veterinary care such as birds, pocket pets, and wildlife.

== Specialization in anesthesia ==
In North America, the American College of Veterinary Anesthesia and Analgesia is one of 22 specialty organizations recognized by the American Veterinary Medical Association. The ACVAA was recognized by the AVMA in 1975, despite attempts by the AVMA to include anesthesia as a subspecialty of surgery or medicine. As of 2016, there are more than 250 diplomates of the ACVAA. To become an ACVAA board-certified Diplomate, veterinarians must have at least one year of clinical practice experience followed by three years of anesthesia residency training under the supervision of ACVAA Diplomates, have accepted for publication a scientific peer-reviewed research article, and passed both a written and clinical competency examination.

In Europe, the European College of Veterinary Anaesthesia and Analgesia (ECVAA) is one of 23 specialty organizations recognized by the European Board of Veterinary Specialization. As of 2024, there are over 4,000 EBVS veterinary specialists in various specialties, out of which 348 are ECVAA Diplomates.

== Anesthesia technicians ==
Anesthesia which is supervised by a qualified technician is safer than anesthesia without a technician. In most private veterinary practices, the technician administers and monitors anesthesia with supervision from the attending veterinarian. In many academic institutions, anesthesia technicians are involved in working with and teaching veterinary students as well as supervising anesthetized cases. The Academy of Veterinary Technicians in Anesthesia and Analgesia is a provisional specialty academy of the North American Veterinary Technician Association and is responsible for licensing technicians as being specialized in anesthesia. For a technician to become specialized, they must be a licensed technician in their state, accumulate 6000 hours of work in veterinary medicine (at least 75% of which must be in anesthesia), 40 hours of continuing education related to anesthesia, demonstrate proficiency in anesthesia skills, and pass a comprehensive written examination.

== Application in animals ==
Anesthesia is required for many surgical procedures which require the patient to be immobile, unaware, and without pain. Furthermore, anesthesia aims to minimize the surgical stress response. In addition, certain diagnostic procedures require anesthesia, notably stomach or airway endoscopy, bone marrow sampling, and occasionally ultrasound. Aggressive animals may require anesthesia in order to handle and perform a physical exam or obtain blood for testing. Exotic animals frequently require anesthesia for simple procedures (such as taking a radiograph or catheter placement) due to lack of domesticity. Animals may require anesthesia for therapeutic procedures, such as urinary catheterization to relieve obstruction, injection into a mass, or removing fluid from the eye to treat glaucoma.

In addition to anesthesia, analgesia is often managed by anesthesiologists or is included in the considerations for anesthesia.

== Techniques ==
=== Small animals ===
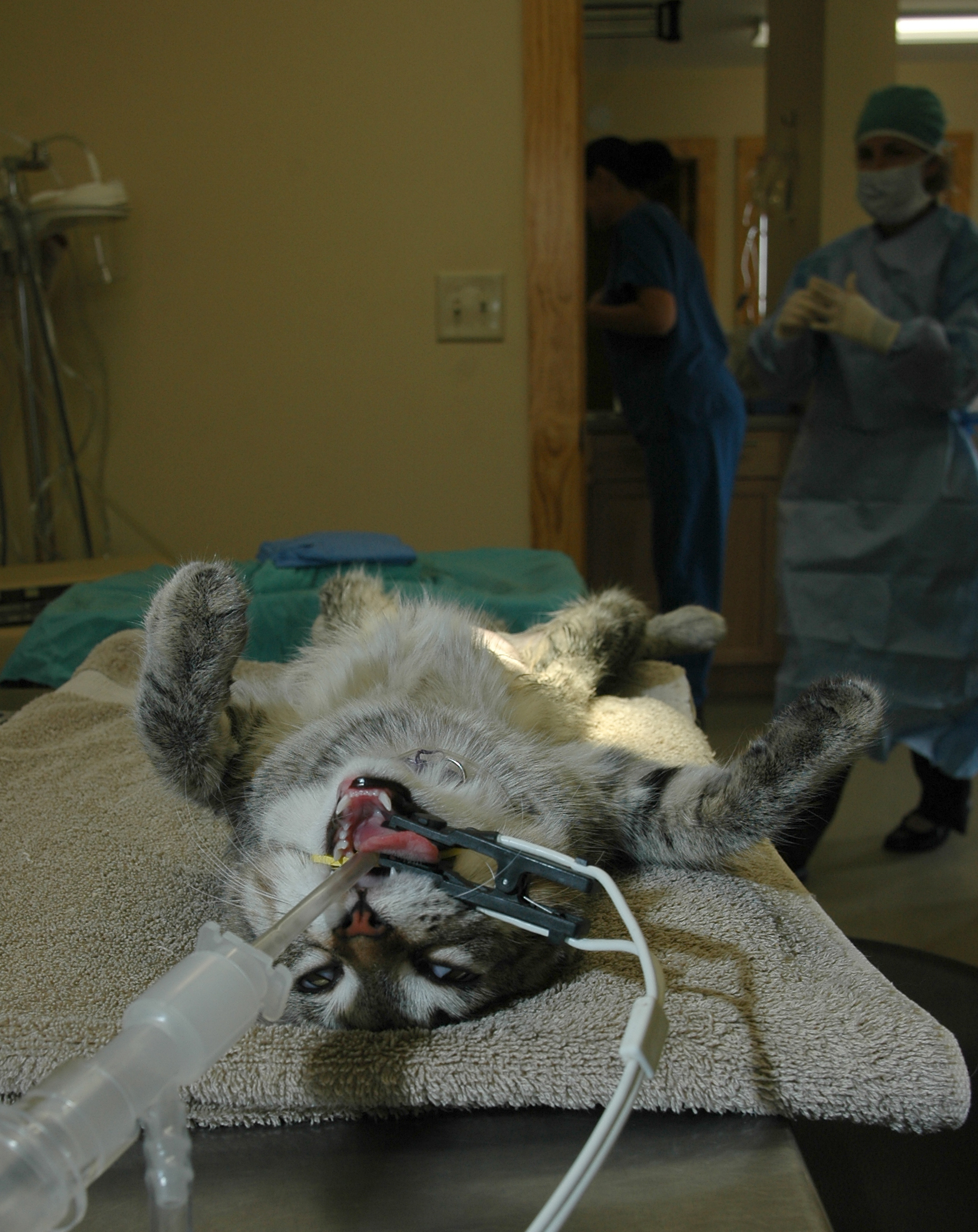
An anesthetized cat

Cats and dogs are frequently anesthetized for surgical procedures. Small animals are most often placed under general anesthesia due to the types of procedures typically performed, the small size of the patient, their suitability to general anesthesia, and the greater degree of control. A balanced anesthesia protocol can be used whereby different drugs with different effects are used so that a high dose of just one drug can be avoided. For example, combining a sedative and an opioid will permit less inhalant anesthesia to be used, improving cardiovascular stability. A one-year study in a teaching hospital shows that dogs and cats typically experience a 1 in 9 chance of anesthetic complications, with a 1 in 233 risk of death. A larger-scale study states the risk of death in healthy dogs and cats as 1 in 1849 and 1 in 895 respectively. For sick dogs and cats, it was 1 in 75 and 1 in 71 respectively. For rabbits, the risk was 1 in 137 and 1 in 14 respectively for the healthy and sick groups.

=== Horses and ruminants ===
Many procedures can be performed on the standing horse with heavy sedation alone. Some procedures may require general anesthesia due to the location of surgery (for example, castration). Other procedures in horses require general anesthesia using an inhalant anesthetic. Horses, due to their complex physiology as performance animals, suffer a number of difficulties that can complicate anesthesia. This results in horses having a higher risk of perioperative fatality - approximately 1 in 400. The number of complications related to fractures or myopathies are approximately 32%

Most procedures in ruminants can be performed standing under sedation and/or local anesthesia. This strategy is manageable due to the types of procedures being performed, the larger size of the patient, the relative difficulty of general anesthesia, and the cost of the procedure versus the product value of the animal.

=== Exotic pets ===
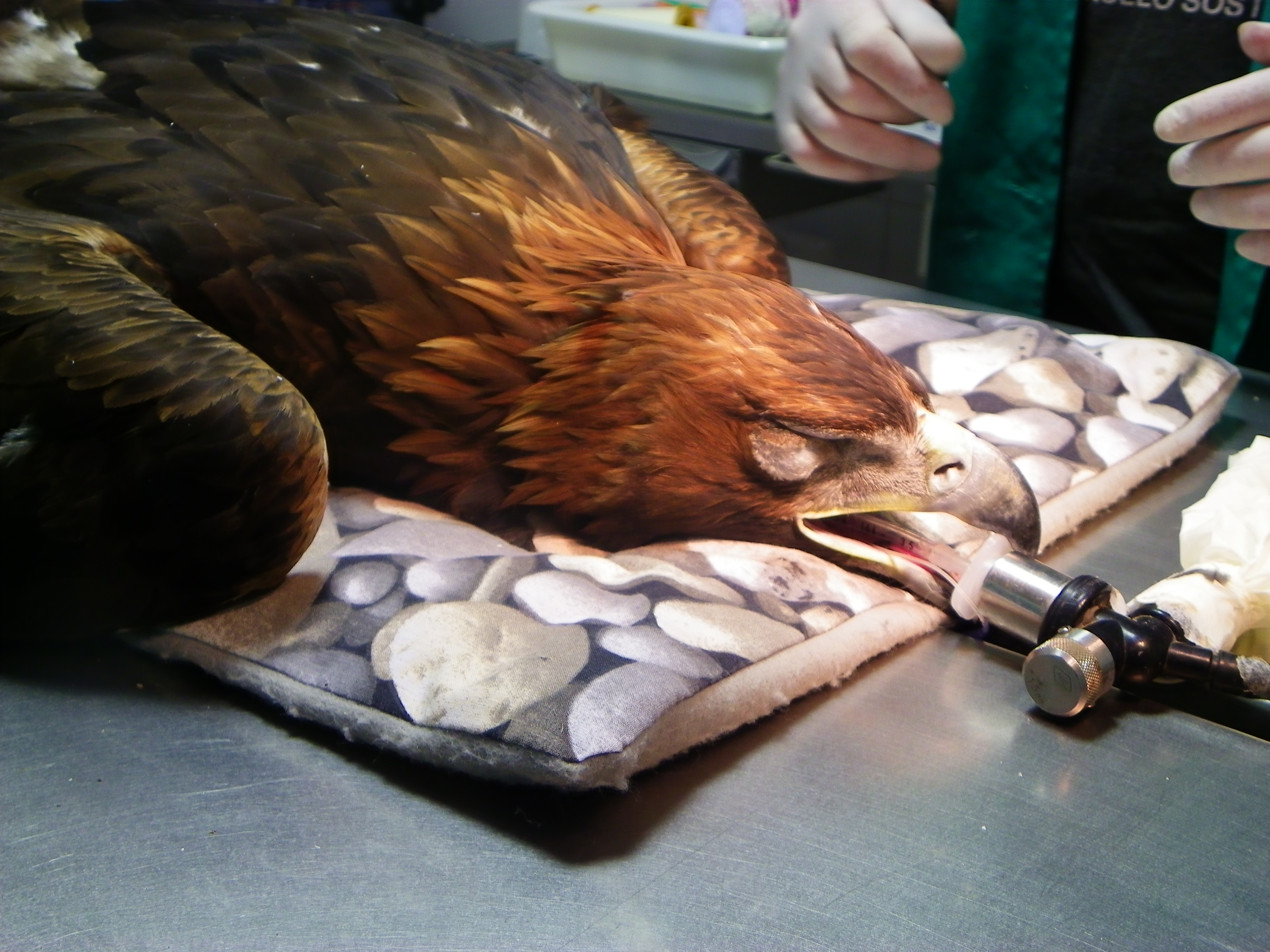
An anesthetized eagle

Anesthesia of exotic animals (guinea pigs, rabbits, birds) is challenging and the higher peri-anesthetic mortality in these species compared to dogs and cats, attests to this fact. These animals are challenging to anesthetize for a number of reasons: very little research has been carried out on safe and effective drug doses for specific species; exotic pets often 'hide' the fact that they are sick and by the time owners realize how sick the pet is the course of the disease is far advanced; the unique anatomy and physiology of exotic pets poses challenges for anesthetic management. For example, the anatomy of the respiratory system of birds, guinea pigs, and reptiles makes it difficult to induce and maintain anesthesia solely with inhalation agents such as isoflurane and sevoflurane. Injectable drugs such as sedatives or tranquilizers are often used in these patients to facilitate induction and maintenance of anesthesia.

== Categories of Anesthetic agents ==
Most anesthetic agents used in human medicine are also used in veterinary medicine. These drugs can be classified by level of sedation, method of providing anesthesia, and type of drug. Anesthetics can only be provided to a patient after a full physical examination, evaluation of temperament, and an overview of medical history are completed. After that, the required protocol, appropriate amounts of the drug or drugs, and proper equipment should be employed for optimal care and comfort for the animal.

=== Anesthetics by drug type ===
Anesthetic agents can be categorized based on the general drug category it lies in. For example, most anesthetics fall under the categories of inhalants, Alpha-2 receptor agonists, Benzodiazepines, Cyclohexamines, Opioids, NSAIDs, Barbiturates, and local anesthetics. The concentration of each anesthetic administered should vary based on size, species, breed, and other definitive characteristics.

Isoflurane is the most common inhalant used in laboratory and veterinary clinic settings, as it is easily delivered through nose cones or intubation tubes depending on the species and size of the patient. Complete loss of consciousness is usually met within two minutes of administration with inhalant gases like Isoflurane. Some general inhalant agents containing Isoflurane are Forane, Iso, and IsoFlo. These are administered using compressed oxygen to control the concentrations depending on the animal.

Alpha-2 receptor agonist drugs such as xylazine, romifidine, detomidine, and medetomidine, are used frequently in veterinary species of all sizes but are rarely used in people. These agonists are commonly known for their pain-relieving properties on top of their anesthetic properties. However, they are normally paired with cyclohexamines like ketamine to produce the proper level of consciousness to continue procedures properly. Alpha-2 agonists are associated with cardiovascular issues including hypotension and lower heart rate. General Alpha-2 agonists used by veterinarians and technicians are Medetomidine, Dexmedetomidine, and Xylazine through injection.

Unlike Alpha-2 receptor agonists, Benzodiazepines only have anesthetic properties that are not reliable alone. These types of drugs are used in many different species in controlled settings like laboratories and hospitals. High dosages do not provide adequate control of consciousness, so Benzodiazepines are commonly used as pre-anesthetics or low sedatives. Some examples include Valium, Midazolam, and Zolazepam which are administered through injections.

Cyclohexamines are the most common injectable agent used in almost all species. Two examples of cyclohexamines are Ketamine and Tiletamine, which have anesthetic properties but not many analgesic properties. Ketamine, used in children for anesthesia, is used extensively in many species to induce anesthesia or cause heavy sedation. Ketamine is commonly paired with alpha-2 agonists or benzodiazepines to decrease mild side effects. Some examples of Ketamine pairs are Ketamine and Xylazine, Ketamine and Diazepam, and Ketamine, Xylazine, and Acepromazine. These combinations can all be prepared in the same syringe and administered via injection, resulting in prolonged anesthesia periods, decreased cardiovascular stress, and decreased recovery periods.

Opioids are commonly used in both human and animal medicine, as they bind to different receptors in the brain and spinal cord to produce varying effects. These drugs, including Oxymorphone, Morphine, Fentanyl, Methadone, Buprenorphine, and Butorphanol, have been highly used in veterinary anesthesia due to their sedative and analgesic properties, despite their side effects. Side effects include respiratory depression, slowing of the digestive tract, and cardiovascular stress. Butorphanol is rarely used in people but is commonly used in all species. In human medicine, an opioid-free protocol has been employed due to its highly addictive properties and medical complications. Veterinary medicine is in the process of adopting this protocol, as recent studies conducted by Donna M. White and other colleagues to develop a similar procedure and reduce the use of opioids.

Non-steroidal Anti-Inflammatory Drugs, or NSAIDs, are widely known for their analgesic properties, as they can reduce inflammation and manage a variety of pain levels. NSAIDs also act for long periods, making them more favorable than some opioids. Some examples of NSAIDs include Carprofen, Ibuprofen, Acetaminophen, and Ketoprofen. These drugs act on specific enzymes in the body that are responsible for producing hormones and proteins that aid in the control of pain and inflammation. NSAIDs generally affect the kidneys, the liver, and the GI tract. A common sign that the digestive tract has affected the patient is if the patient vomits. Immediately after vomiting, the patient should not be administered an NSAID and examined to determine the cause. Side effects vary from very minimal to very serious, so proper examination prior to administration is required.

Barbiturates are anesthetics that activate GABA_{A} receptors, resulting in the activation of chloride channels and the inhibition of the postsynaptic neuron. Like all other anesthetics, Barbiturates depress the central nervous system causing relaxation and comfort. These drugs are delivered via injection, but not at low concentrations as they are merely insufficient at low doses for both sedation and pain management. Barbiturates are known for their long-acting time, as well as their prolonged recovery time. They are also very expensive and may cause problems to the respiratory system. Commonly found examples of Barbiturates include Sodium Pentobarbital, Thiopental, and Methohexital.

Local anesthetic drugs like Lidocaine, Bupivacaine, Ropivacaine, and Proparacaine block sodium channels, providing relief of pain from those nerves. Since sodium channels are closed, the neurons can not fire and therefore no signals are sent to the brain and spinal cord, reducing pain levels. Local anesthetics are commonly used in combination with anti-inflammatory drugs and opioids or alpha-2 receptor agonists to provide better pain relief and safer anesthesia. Local anesthetics can be administered through injection or topical solutions to areas around the nose and eyes.

Each species has different responses to different types of drugs. For example, horses may experience mania with morphine whereas dogs typically become sedated. In addition, pigs and goats are well sedated with midazolam, which in juxtaposition, excites dogs and cats. Tricaine-S/Aqualife TMS (MS-222) is commonly used to anesthetize aquatic animals, including fish, amphibians, and other aquatic, cold-blooded animals.

=== Levels of sedation ===
The type and level of anesthesia capabilities are another way to categorize anesthetics in veterinary medicine. The first level is called low fear, anxiety, and stress. This level is not a complete loss of consciousness, but a slowing of heart rate and behavior to make the animals easier to handle. Drugs like Gabapentin, Trazodone, or Alpha-2 Agonists can be used alone to produce these effects.

The second level is light sedation, where the patient is slightly under for a short period of time. Examples of anesthetics to achieve this level are opioids and benzodiazepine. In cats, opioids alone are used to produce this effect. In dogs, a combination of an opioid and benzodiazepine can be used.

The second to last level is moderate sedation, which occurs for longer periods of time with stronger sedatives. Anesthetics that fit this category are other opioids, tranquilizers, benzodiazepines, and alpha-2 agonists. Combinations of opioids and tranquilizers, opioids and alpha-2 agonists, or all three together can achieve this level of sedation.

Finally, the last level of sedation is heavy sedation, which is used for major procedures and lasts longer than the other three levels. Drugs that meet these needs are opioids, benzodiazepines, alpha-2 agonists, neurosteroids, and dissociatives. Alpha-2 agonists can be used alone in dogs and cats to produce this effect. A combination of Alpha-2 agonists and neurosteroids or dissociatives also achieve the same effect.

=== Methods of administration ===
More generally, anesthetic agents can be categorized based on how they are administered to the patient. There are several ways to provide animal anesthesia depending on the animal and its size and breed, some methods are preferred over others.

The first category of anesthetics is inhalants, or drugs that are delivered in gas form through a mask or endotracheal tube. These drugs are administered in combination with oxygen, which is vaporized using a precision vaporizer. Some common examples of inhalant anesthetics are nitrous oxide, halothane, isoflurane, desflurane, and sevoflurane. Nitrous oxide is most commonly used, but recent consideration of its side effects and uses has rendered it controversial.

Another method of delivery is through injection. The injection can be considered intravenous, intramuscular, subcutaneous, intrathoracic, or intraperitoneal. Intravenous injection occurs when the needle is inserted into the veins and delivers the medication directly into the bloodstream. Intramuscular injection is the administration of a drug deep into the muscles via a needle, which allows the drug to go into the bloodstream as well. Subcutaneous injections occur when the needle is inserted between the skin and muscle, allowing the drug to be absorbed into the bloodstream over a prolonged period. Veterinarians use intrathoracic injections to deliver medication into the thoracic cavity, or the chest region, and right near the surface of the heart. Intraperitoneal injection is the method of injection where the needle is inserted into the peritoneal cavity, or a region in the lower abdomen. This method is generally used in rodents and other laboratory animals because of easier handling. Intravenous, Intramuscular, and Subcutaneous injections are more commonly used in veterinary medicine, as they are easier and more efficient.

The third method of administration is through the mouth or anus. Certified technicians or veterinarians mostly deliver liquid solutions through the mouth or anus. Not only is anesthesia delivered via these routes, but also some analgesics. These two routes provide a larger variety in responses in one breed due to the differences in absorption rates through tissue. Despite this, it is very commonly used.

The last common method of delivering anesthetics is by applying it topically or through small injections using local anesthetics like Lidocaine. This method is used during surgery to block the nerves in a certain region that is being operated on. In addition, topical ointments block the nerves in a specific region for shorter durations. One small injection could be at the sight of a nerve trunk, therefore blocking the nerves in that entire region.

== See also ==
- American College of Veterinary Anesthesia and Analgesia
- European College of Veterinary Anaesthesia and Analgesia
- Veterinary specialties
- Tranquilizer gun (Anesthetic dart gun)
