= New Zealand Veterinary Nursing Association =

Representative Body

- Abbreviation: NZVNA
- Established: 1992; 34 years ago
- Type: Not for Profit
- Location: Level 2/44 Victoria Street, Wellington
- Services: Professional support and advice for veterinary nurses and technologists.
- President: Laura Harvey
- Website: www.nzvna.org.nz

The New Zealand Veterinary Nursing Association (NZVNA) is the representative body for veterinary nurses in New Zealand. Its purpose is to promote high standards of veterinary nursing in New Zealand.

== History ==
The New Zealand Veterinary Nursing Association was established in 1992 by a group of like minded veterinary nurses, seeking representation within the veterinary profession in New Zealand. As of October 2018 the membership of the association stands at just over 1160 members. Veterinary nursing in New Zealand is a profession in its own right, moving away from the previous classification of paraprofessionals.

== Purpose ==
The New Zealand Veterinary Nursing Association functions as the representative body for veterinary nurses in New Zealand. It provides an annual Continuing Professional Development scheme, linked closely with voluntary registration. The association produces a quarterly journal (The New Zealand Veterinary Nurse) and a regular e-newsletter to keep members up to date with current issues in the veterinary nursing profession.

Executive committee members of the association provide support to its members on a wide range of topics, including Human Resources, Wellbeing, and Professional Development.

The NZVNA set recommended wage guidelines for veterinary nurses and veterinary nursing assistants. The NZVNA oversees Continuing Professional Development (CPD) for veterinary nurses, and provides accreditation for CPD providers.

=== WSAVA affiliate ===
The New Zealand Veterinary Nursing Association was the first representative body for veterinary nurses to be an affiliate member of the World Small Animal Veterinary Association (WSAVA).

=== IVNTA affiliate ===
The New Zealand Veterinary Nursing Association is a permanent member of the International Veterinary Nurses and Technicians Association (which advocates communication and co-operation of veterinary nurses and technicians around the world).

== Regulation ==
In 2016, the New Zealand Veterinary Nursing Association implemented voluntary registration of veterinary nurses. Previously, there was no form of registration, or formal way of recognising veterinary nursing qualifications.

Registration of veterinary nurses in New Zealand is now overseen by the Allied Veterinary Professional Regulatory Council (AVPRC)."Regulation". avprc.org.nz.

Veterinary nursing qualifications were reformed following the 2014–2015 government-mandated Targeted Review of Qualifications (TRoQ). The Diploma in Veterinary Nursing (Level 6) was introduced in 2016, and updated NZQA-approved qualifications commenced in 2025."Animal Healthcare and Veterinary Nursing". The Diploma in Veterinary Nursing remains the minimum qualification required for registration."VETERINARY NURSES" (PDF).

== Veterinary Nurse Awareness Week ==
The New Zealand Veterinary Nursing Association (NZVNA) organizes Veterinary Nurse Awareness Week (VNAW) annually during the first week of October to raise visibility for the profession and celebrate the contributions of veterinary nurses."Veterinary Nurse Awareness Week". nzvna.org.nz. The week culminates with the Vet Nurse of the Year Award, established in 2013 in partnership with Hill’s Pet Nutrition. The award recognizes veterinary nurses who demonstrate excellence in patient care, team support, professional initiative, continuing education, qualifications, and years of service."Vet Nurse of the Year Award". nzvna.org.nz.

== Vet Nurse of the Year award winners ==
The NZVNA and Hill's Veterinary Nurse of the Year Award was launched in 2013 to recognise New Zealand veterinary nurses who advocate and significantly contribute to the care of their patients, and who are an integral part of the veterinary health care team.

Previous Vet Nurse of the Year winners
Year	Name
2025	Alex Flowers
2024	Marcus Flintoff
2023	Tenneal Prebble
2022	Cherie McLean
2021	Margie Rutherford
2020	Michelle Martin
2019	Jess Byrnes-Clark
2018	Ellie Clark
2017	Alice Gasnier
2016	Kate Leveridge
2015	Wendy Jarnet
2014	Lisa Jamieson
2013	Tania Fernandez

== Past Presidents of NZVNA ==
Past Presidents of the NZVNA
Name	Years active
Amy Ross	2021-2024
Julie Hutt	2011-2021
Sarah O’Hagan	2008-2011
Kathy Waugh	2005-2008
Marie Hennessy	2002-2005
Jan Bedford	2001-2002
Janet Molyneux	2000-2001
Val Lee	1997-2000
Steph McPherson	1994-1997
Angela Molloy	1991-1994
