= Indonesian Veterinary Medical Association =

Non-profit professional association

The Indonesian Veterinary Medical Association (Indonesian: Perhimpunan Dokter Hewan Indonesia) is a non-profit, professional organization representing veterinary medicine in Indonesia. The association was established on 9 January 1953 in Lembang, West Java. Its activities include professional continuing education, accreditation, and maintaining a professional code of conduct for its members. The association's headquarters are located in Jakarta.
