= Veterinary immunology =

Veterinary immunology is the study of the immune system in animals and how it functions in health and disease. It is a branch of biomedical science closely related to veterinary medicine and zoology.

The field examines how animals respond to pathogens, how vaccines stimulate immunity, and why immune responses sometimes fail or lead to adverse reactions. It also studies immune disorders and mechanisms of disease resistance in different species.

Veterinary immunology is essential in improving animal health and developing vaccines for livestock and companion animals.
