= American Veterinary Medical Association =

Organization

- Formation: 9 July 1863; 163 years ago
- Headquarters: 1931 North Meacham Road, Suite 100, Schaumburg, IL 60173-4360
- Website: avma.org

The American Veterinary Medical Association (AVMA) is an American not-for-profit association founded in 1863 that represents more than 105,000 second veterinarians.

The AVMA provides information resources, continuing education opportunities, publications, and discounts on personal and professional products, programs, and services. The AVMA indicates that it lobbies for animal friendly legislation within a framework that supports the use of animals for human purposes (e.g., food, fiber, research, companionship).

The AVMA Council on Education is the designated accrediting body for schools of veterinary medicine in the United States.

The AVMA publishes the Journal of the American Veterinary Medical Association (JAVMA) and the American Journal of Veterinary Research (AJVR).

The AVMA's veterinary student organization is the Student American Veterinary Medical Association (SAVMA).

== History ==
The American Veterinary Medical Association (AVMA) was founded in 1863, when 40 delegates representing seven states met for a convention in New York. Originally named the United States Veterinary Medical Association, the USVMA was renamed the AVMA in 1889.

By 1913, the AVMA consisted of 1,650 members, with membership open only to graduates of accredited veterinary schools.

As of 2021, the AVMA has more than 97,000 members. In addition to treating pets, veterinarians work in a number of fields, such as public health, agriculture, food safety, academics, and the military.

== AVMA policy ==
The AVMA produces policies in response to member requests and stakeholder interest. These statements are general and aim to encourage improvement based on the best available scientific evidence.

In 2005, the AVMA changed its policy on pregnant sow housing, stating that "given the number of variables and large variation in performance within both group and stall systems for pregnant sows, no one system is clearly better than others under all conditions and according to all criteria of animal welfare". The AVMA's policy was adopted after a comprehensive review by a multi-disciplinary, multi-perspective task force of experts that produced an accompanying review of housing for pregnant sows.

The AVMA has voted on several proposals to take a formal stand against the forced feeding of birds to make foie gras. Although foie gras has been banned in many countries in Europe, as well as in the U.S. state of California, because of an absence of science specifically addressing the welfare aspects of foie gras production, as well as conflicting opinions among its membership, the AVMA opted not to take a stand either for or against foie gras. The AVMA has published a welfare implications of foie gras production backgrounder.

The AVMA has received pushback from many veterinarians for its classification of ventilation shutdown plus (VSD+) as "acceptable under constrained circumstances". Many veterinarians regard the method as cruel and have questioned the justification for the classification. In its guidelines, the AVMA relied only on one report from North Carolina State University and argued this gave evidence that VSD+ provided sufficiently limited suffering. However, this unpublished report's methodology has been questioned by organizations such as the Animal Welfare Institute for using an untested metric for stress (using heat shock protein 70), containing mathematical errors, having unclear writing, and more. Despite the AVMA's Guidelines for the Depopulation of Animals stating that ventilation shutdown plus should only be used as an extermination method in poultry in constrained circumstances, it has become the most common method of exterminating large flocks.

== Legislation ==
AVMA supported the Veterinary Medicine Mobility Act of 2014, a law that amended the Controlled Substances Act (CSA) to clarify that veterinarians are not required to have separate registrations to dispense controlled substances outside of their principal place of business, such as when treating animals on a farm. AVMA argued that "the CSA must be amended so that our nation's animals do not suffer unnecessarily." Due to an interpretation of the law by the Drug Enforcement Administration, veterinarians were not allowed to travel to their off-site animal patients with controlled substances.

== Academic Accreditation ==
The United States Department of Education has designated the AVMA Council on Education as the accrediting body for schools of veterinary medicine in the United States. In this capacity, the AVMA develops and maintains educational standards for these institutions to ensure the qualifications and competency of graduates of veterinary schools.

Two bodies within AVMA are responsible for veterinary education accreditation: the AVMA Council on Education (COE) and the Committee on Veterinary Technician Education and Activities (CVTEA). The former is responsible for accreditation of veterinary colleges and the latter veterinary technology programs.

=== AVMA-accredited Veterinary Colleges ===
As of 2025, there are 54 AVMA-accredited veterinary colleges, with 31 being in the United States.

Country/Region	State/Province/Territory	City	School
United States	Alabama	Auburn	Auburn University
United States	Alabama	Tuskegee	Tuskegee University
United States	Arizona	Glendale	Midwestern University
United States	California	Davis	University of California
United States	California	Pomona	Western University of Health Sciences
United States	Colorado	Fort Collins	Colorado State University
United States	Florida	Gainesville	University of Florida
United States	Georgia	Athens	University of Georgia
United States	Illinois	Urbana	University of Illinois
United States	Indiana	West Lafayette	Purdue University
United States	Iowa	Ames	Iowa State University
United States	Kansas	Manhattan	Kansas State University
United States	Louisiana	Baton Rouge	Louisiana State University
United States	Massachusetts	North Grafton	Tufts University
United States	Michigan	East Lansing	Michigan State University
United States	Minnesota	Saint Paul	University of Minnesota
United States	Mississippi	Mississippi State	Mississippi State University
United States	Missouri	Columbia	University of Missouri-Columbia
United States	New York	Ithaca	Cornell University
United States	North Carolina	Raleigh	North Carolina State University
United States	Ohio	Columbus	The Ohio State University
United States	Oklahoma	Stillwater	Oklahoma State University
United States	Oregon	Corvallis	Oregon State University
United States	Pennsylvania	Philadelphia	University of Pennsylvania
United States	Tennessee	Knoxville	University of Tennessee
United States	Tennessee	Harrogate	Lincoln Memorial University
United States	Texas	College Station	Texas A&M University
United States	Texas	Lubbock	Texas Tech University
United States	Virginia	Blacksburg	Virginia-Maryland College of Veterinary Medicine
United States	Washington	Pullman	Washington State University
United States	Wisconsin	Madison	University of Wisconsin-Madison
Australia	Western Australia	Murdoch	Murdoch University
Australia	New South Wales	Sydney	The University of Sydney
Australia	Victoria	Melbourne	University of Melbourne
Australia	Queensland	Gatton	University of Queensland
Canada	Quebec	Saint Hyacinthe	Université de Montréal
Canada	Alberta	Calgary	University of Calgary
Canada	Ontario	Guelph	University of Guelph
Canada	Prince Edward Island	Charlottetown	University of Prince Edward Island
Canada	Saskatchewan	Saskatoon	University of Saskatchewan
United Kingdom	England	London	The Royal Veterinary College
United Kingdom	England	Bristol	University of Bristol
United Kingdom	England	Leicestershire	University of Nottingham
United Kingdom	England	Liverpool	University of Liverpool
United Kingdom	Scotland	Glasgow	University of Glasgow
United Kingdom	Scotland	Edinburgh	The University of Edinburgh
France	Auvergne-Rhône-Alpes	Marcy-l'Étoile	VetAgro Sup
Ireland	Leinster	Dublin	University College, Dublin
Korea	Gwanak District	Seoul	Seoul National University
Mexico	Mexico City	Mexico City	Universidad Nacional Autónoma de México
The Netherlands	Utrecht Province	Utrecht	Utrecht University
New Zealand	Palmerston North	Palmerston North	Massey University
West Indies	St. Kitts	Basseterre	Ross University
West Indies	Grenada	St. George's	St. George's University

=== AVMA-accredited Veterinary Technology Programs ===
As of 2021, the AVMA accredits veterinary technician programs in all but three U.S. states, one program in Canada, and a number of distance learning programs.

=== AVMA Provisionally Accredited Veterinary Colleges ===
As of 2025, there are five colleges provisionally accredited by the AVMA.

Country/Region	State/Province/Territory	City	School
United States	Arizona	Tucson	University of Arizona
United States	New Jersey	Mullica Hill	Rowan University
United States	New York	Brookville	Long Island University
United States	Puerto Rico	Gurabo	Ana G. Méndez University
United States	Utah	Logan	Utah State University

== Specialists in veterinary medicine ==
According to the AVMA, a board-certified veterinary specialist is "a veterinarian who has completed additional training in a specific area of veterinary medicine and has passed an examination that evaluates their knowledge and skills in that specialty area."

As of 2021, the AVMA recognizes 22 veterinary specialty organizations, including American College of Veterinary Anesthesia and Analgesia, American College of Veterinary Surgeons, and American College of Zoological Medicine. The AVMA recognizes 41 distinct veterinary specialties, including anesthesia, behavior, dentistry, parasitology, pathology, pharmacology, and surgery.
