= List of veterinarians =

Veterinarians and veterinary surgeons are medical professionals who operate exclusively on animals. This is a list of notable veterinarians, both real and fictional.

== Real-life veterinarians ==
=== A ===
- Wayne Allard (born 1943) – U.S. Senator (1997–2009)
- Maurice Allen (born 1937) – veterinary pathologist

=== B ===
- Chris Back (born 1950) – Australian Senator (2009–2017)
- Bernhard Lauritz Frederik Bang (1848–1932) – Danish veterinarian who discovered Brucella abortus
- Denis Barberet (1714–1770) – French bibliographer and author
- Harold William Bennetts (1898–1970) – Australian known for research on livestock and the toxic effects of native Australian plants
- Natanael Berg (1879–1957) – Swedish composer
- Reidar Birkeland (born 1928) – professor at the Norwegian School of Veterinary Science
- Baxter Black (1945–2022) – U.S. radio commentator
- Marie-Claude Bomsel (born 1946) – wildlife expert
- Alfred Boquet (1879–1947) – French veterinarian, known for his work at the Pasteur Institute in Paris
- Claude Bourgelat (1712–1779) – founder of 18th-century French veterinary school
- Anton Johnson Brandt (1893–1951) – professor of pathological anatomy at the Norwegian School of Veterinary Science
- Chris Brown (born 1978) – known for the Australian television series Bondi Vet

=== C ===
- Nelson R. Çabej (born 1939) – Albania evolutionary biologist and author
- Charles J Coottes Campbell (1894–2001) British/Commonwealth equine veterinarian
- Louis J. Camuti (1893–1981) – first American cat veterinarian
- Philibert Chabert (1737–1814) – French agronomist who wrote on early treatise on anthrax control
- Craig Challen (born 1965/1966) – Australian diver and caver
- John A. Charlton (1907–1977) – Canadian politician
- Auguste Chauveau (1827–1917) – French veterinarian, in whose honor the bacterium Clostridium chauvoei is named
- Matthew Clarke (born 1973) – former professional Australian rules footballer
- Ken Coghill (born 1944) – former Australian politician
- Robert Cook – British equine veterinarian
- Robin Coombs (1921–2006) – British immunologist, co-discoverer of the Coombs test
- Harry Cooper (born 1943) – Australian television personality
- Miguel Cordero del Campillo (1925–2020) – Spanish parasitologist

=== D ===
- Morné de la Rey (born 1970) – South African veterinarian who was the first person in Africa to clone an animal, as well as first person to do successful IVF in Cape Buffalo in the world.
- Darlene Dixon – American veterinarian and toxicologic pathologist
- Sydney Dodd (1874–1926) – British veterinary surgeon who was the first lecturer in veterinary bacteriology at the University of Sydney
- Peter C. Doherty (born 1940) – Australian veterinary surgeon and researcher joint recipient of the 1996 Nobel Prize in Physiology or Medicine
- Mick Doyle (1941–2004) – Irish rugby player
- Petrus Johann du Toit (1888–1967) – South African veterinarian
- John Boyd Dunlop (1840–1921) – Scottish inventor of the tyre

=== E ===
- Henrik Edland (1905–1984) – professor of anatomy at the Norwegian School of Veterinary Science
- John Ensign (born 1958) – U.S. Senator (2001–2011)

=== F ===
- Martin J. Fettman (born 1956) – U.S. astronaut and veterinary pathologist
- Kevin Fitzgerald (born 1951) – American television documentary veterinarian
- Bruce Fogle (born 1944) – Canadian veterinarian
- Birger Furugård (1887–1961) – Swedish politician

=== G ===
- Doug Galt (born 1937/1938) – former Canadian politician
- Pierre-Victor Galtier (1846–1908) – French veterinarian, notable for his research into rabies.
- Hugh Gordon (1909–2002) – Australian parasitologist
- John Russell Greig (1889–1963) – Scottish veterinarian, notable for his research into milk fever
- Camille Guérin (1872–1961) – developed a vaccine for tuberculosis

=== H ===
- James Hallen (1829–1901) – British veterinarian who served as General Superintendent of Horse Breeding in India
- Greg J. Harrison – avian veterinarian
- Susanne Hart (1927–2010) – South African environmentalist
- Antonie Marinus Harthoorn (1923–2012) – conservationist who worked in Africa
- Herbert Haupt (born 1947) – Austrian politician
- James Herriot (1916–1995) – pen name of James Alfred Wight, author of books about animals
- Vanessa M. Hirsch – Canadian-American veterinary pathologist and virologist
- Thomas William Hogarth (1901–1999) – Scottish-Australian veterinarian, writer on dogs
- John Holt (1931–2013) – Australian veterinarian and sports shooter
- William Hunting (1846–1913) – founder of The Veterinary Record

=== J ===
- Dawda Jawara (1924–2019) – first president of Gambia
- Joan O. Joshua (1912–1993)

=== K ===
- Mark D Kittleson (born 1950) – American veterinary cardiologist, researcher, and educator

=== L ===
- Amy K. LeBlanc – U.S. veterinary oncologist
- Richard M. Linnehan (born 1957) – U.S. astronaut
- Buster Lloyd-Jones (1914–1980) – British veterinary surgeon

=== M ===
- Svend Lomholt (1888–1949) – Danish veterinarian
- Zoltán Magyar (born 1953) – Hungarian gymnast; gold medalist in men's pommel horse at the 1976 and 1980 Summer Olympics
- Miguel Ángel J. Márquez Ruiz (born 1942) – Mexican veterinarian
- Tracey McNamara – veterinary pathologist at the Bronx Zoo who played a pivotal role in identifying the first outbreak of West Nile Virus in the United States
- Keith Meldrum (born 1937) – Chief Veterinary Officer of the United Kingdom (1988–1997)
- Veranus Alva Moore (1859–1931) – Dean of Cornell University College of Veterinary Medicine (1908–1929)
- Suzanne Morrow (1930–2006) – Canadian figure skater who took the Official's Oath at the 1988 Winter Olympics

=== N ===
- Denis Napthine (born 1952) – Australian politician
- Rich Nye (born 1944) – American professional baseball pitcher turned exotic animal/avian veterinarian

=== O ===
- Peter Ostrum (born 1957) – child actor who was Charlie Bucket in the 1971 motion picture Willy Wonka & the Chocolate Factory

=== P ===
- Frederick Douglass Patterson (1901–1988) – recipient of the Presidential Medal of Freedom in 1987, the highest civilian honor in the U.S.
- Sonny Perdue (born 1946) – U.S. politician, former Governor of Georgia
- Brian Perry (born 1946) – epidemiologist
- Walter Plowright (1923–2010) – English veterinary scientist who worked to eradicate rinderpest

=== R ===
- Nicky Rackard (1922–1976) – Irish hurler
- Carl Gottlob Rafn (1769–1808) – Danish multi-disciplinary scientist
- Robert L. Rooks – American veterinarian
- John Gunion Rutherford (1857–1923) – Canadian politician
- Stuart Reid (veterinarian) (born 1974) – President and Principal of the Royal Veterinary College

=== S ===
- Suzanne Saueressig (1924–2013) – first practicing female veterinarian in Missouri
- Elmo Shropshire (born 1936) – best known as the singer of the novelty Christmas song "Grandma Got Run Over by a Reindeer"
- Erzsébet Simonyi (1915–1993) – first woman to earn a veterinary degree in Hungary and founder of the Veterinary Vaccine Control Institute.
- Brian Sinclair (1915–1988) – best known for his association with James Alfred Wight who fictionalized him as Tristan Farnon
- Donald Sinclair (1911–1995) – best known as partner to James Alfred Wight who fictionalized him as Sigfried Farnon
- Danielle Spencer (born 1965) – actor
- Harry Spira – Australian pioneer in dog breeding technologies
- Leonid Stadnyk (1970–2014) – Ukrainian veterinarian renowned for his height
- Harry Steele-Bodger (1896–1952) – British veterinarian
- Michael G. Strain (born 1959) – American veterinarian who is the incumbent Louisiana Agriculture and Forestry Commissioner

=== T ===
- Arnold Theiler (1867–1936) – described the horse disease which became known as Theiler's disease
- James Thomson (born 1958) – American developmental biologist who derived the first human embryonic stem cell line in 1998
- Simon Fraser Tolmie (1867–1937) – Canadian politician
- Debbye Turner (born 1965) – Miss America 1990, resident veterinarian for CBS' The Early Show

=== V ===
- Erik Viborg (1759–1822) – Danish veterinarian and botanist

=== W ===
- Hugh Wirth (1939–2018) – Australian animal welfare advocate with RSPCA Australia, radio broadcaster

=== Y ===
- Sophia Yin (1966–2014) – American animal behaviorist and pioneer of positive reinforcement training for pets.
- William Youatt (1776–1847) – English veterinary surgeon and animal welfare writer

=== Z ===
- Robert Zammit – Australian television veterinarian

== Fictional veterinarians ==
- From the British soap opera Emmerdale:
  - Rhona Goskirk
  - Max King
  - Paddy Kirk
  - Hari Prasad
  - Zoe Tate
- From the Australian soap opera Neighbours:
  - Steve Parker
  - Gemma Ramsay
- From the children's books series The Story of Doctor Dolittle: Doctor Dolittle
- From the US television series The Walking Dead: Hershel Greene
- From the South Korean drama series Hey Ghost, Let's Fight: Joo Hye-sung
- From the South Korean drama series The King's Doctor: Baek Kwang-hyun
- From the Japanese drama series Is There a Vet in the House?: Kentarō Shiba
- From the Japanese manga Kisei Jūi Suzune: Suzune Arizono
- From the Japanese manga Wild Life: Tesshō Iwashiro
