= Paraveterinary worker =

Professional in veterinary medicine

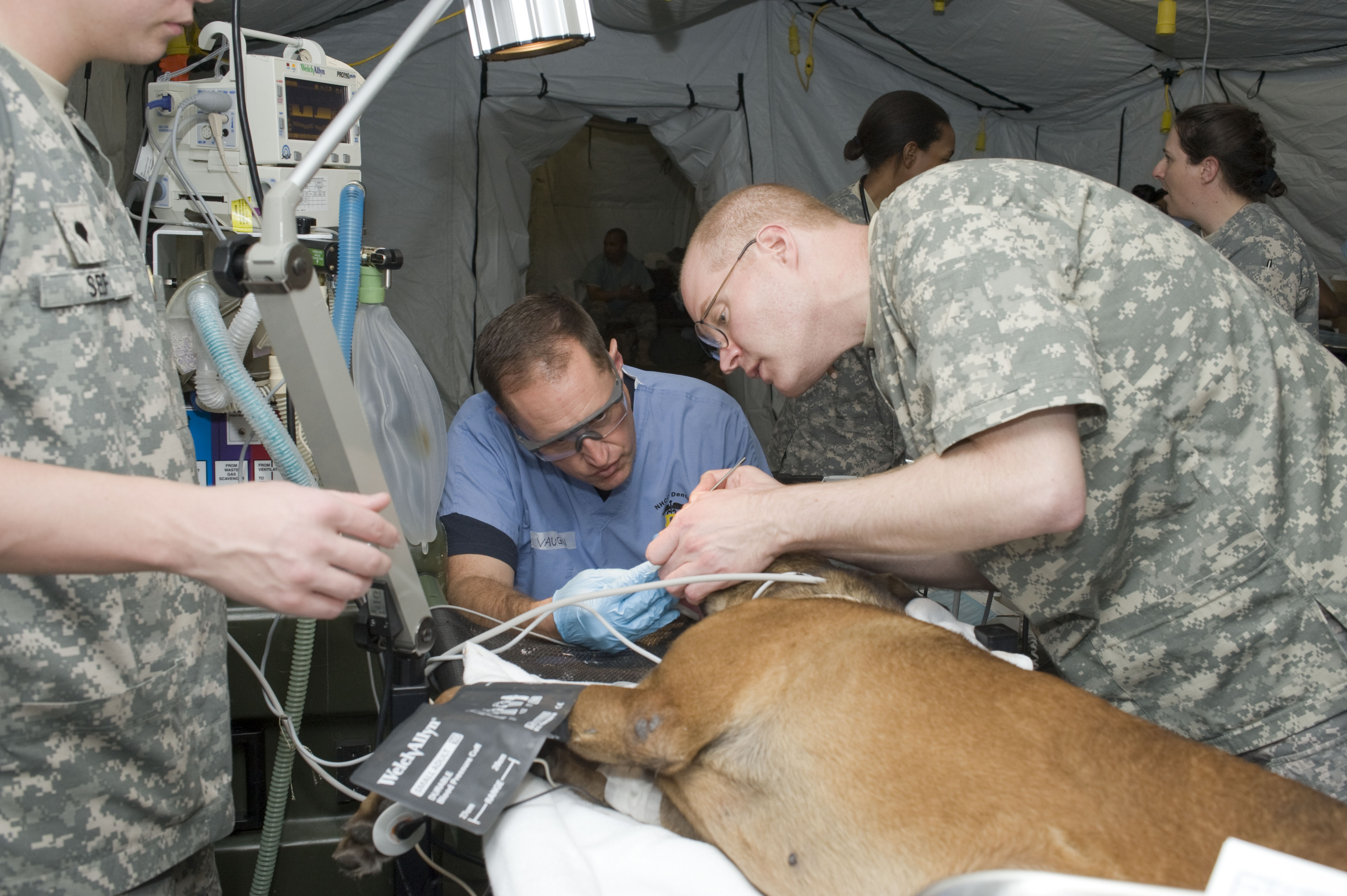
Veterinary technicians of the US Army assist in an operation on a military working dog

A paraveterinarian is a professional of veterinary medicine who performs procedures autonomously or semi-autonomously, as part of a veterinary assistance system. The job role varies throughout the world, and common titles include veterinary nurse, veterinary technician, and veterinary assistant, and variants with the prefix of "animal health".

The scope of practice varies between countries, with some allowing suitably qualified paraveterinarian scope of autonomous practice, including minor surgery, whilst others restricting their workers as assistants to other professionals.

== Nomenclature ==
=== Veterinary technician / nurse ===
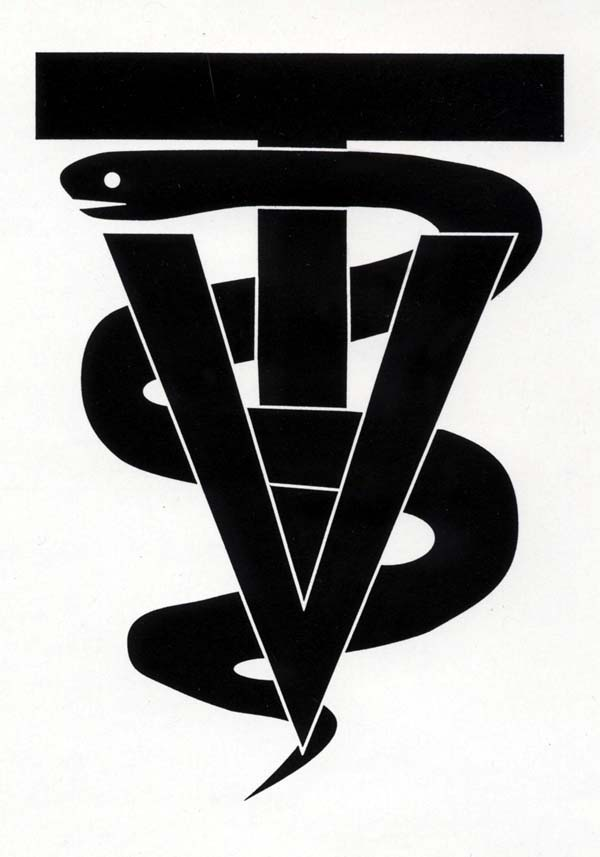
United States veterinary technician logo

In North America, paraveterinary workers who have completed a course of study, passed an examination, and have a defined scope of practice are called veterinary technicians. Veterinary technicians hold a technician degree in Veterinary Technology. Most Canadian provinces have a formal registration process and, legally, veterinarians must hire registered veterinary technicians. In America credentialed veterinary technicians must attend a Veterinary Technician program approved by the American Veterinary Medical Association (AVMA), most of which are two year programs which confer an Associate of Science (or an Associate of Applied Science) Degree in Veterinary Technology. Graduates must pass the VTNE (Veterinary Technician National Exam) to become credentialed in their state. These credentials (whether Licensed [LVT], Registered [RVT], or Certified [CVT]) must be renewed every two years with requirements varying from state-to-state.

Human nursing associations have often claimed rights over the title "Nurse". In some countries this is protected by law, and in the United States, 39 states have outlined title protections over the usage of "Nurse", with Nursing Practice Acts mandating that only those who are Licensed Practical Nurses / Licensed Vocational Nurses (LPNs/LVNs), Registered Nurses (RNs), and Nurse Practitioners (NPs) may use the title "Nurse".

"Nurse" title protection was in place in the United Kingdom until 1984, where veterinary nurses were referred to as 'registered animal nursing auxiliaries', in line with the naming convention at the time for less qualified assistants in human nursing, called 'nursing auxiliaries'.

There are currently only seven countries in the world (out of ~195) who have a recognized paraveterinary profession and use the term "Veterinary Nurse" to describe those workers:

- UK - Registered Veterinary Nurses
- Ireland - Registered Veterinary Nurses (a profession in its infancy)
- Australia:
  - Veterinary Nurses in only one state (Queensland). However, a VN title can be acquired with little education and only a certificate. Voluntary credentialing opened in some other states in 2018, but this is also a profession in its infancy.
  - Vet Technicians, in contrast, hold a 3-year degree completed through a University program. The curriculum is not influenced by the industry or government as such and there is no quality assurance of practical skills; however, this degree has more in-depth knowledge required and exposure to much higher level skills.
- New Zealand - both Registered Veterinary Nurses and Veterinary Technicians
  - Veterinary Technicians have the higher degree (3 years of school as opposed to 2)
- South Africa - Veterinary Nurse and Animal Health Technician
  - Each title conferred has completely separate curricula, with the AHT being more like a Nurse Practitioner (in the US); aka a mid-level medical professional.
  - Veterinary Nurses in SA are more like veterinary assistants in the US
- Denmark - title translates to Veterinary Nurse
- Norway - title translates to Veterinary Nurse

There is an effort to change the title of credentialed Veterinary Technicians in the United States but legislative efforts have failed in all four states where the name change has been introduced to date. The VNI has spent over $200,000 with no clear accounting of where the money has been spent and no success. Many state Veterinary Technician associations and Veterinary Medical Associations oppose the effort to change the title of the profession in the United States, and the AVMA has refused to support the name change (but does support the other stated goals of the VNI).

=== Veterinary assistant ===
In most countries, a veterinary assistant is a person with fewer or no formal animal health qualifications, who has no autonomous practice, but who is designated to assist other professionals.

Training programs are often workplace-based, and no formal license or certification is required to perform the role.

In the US, veterinary assistants have the option to earn a certificate of completion by taking basic animal health classes about contagious diseases, animal restraint, record keeping, work place safety, administration, etc. Having the knowledge of the basics allows for the development of trust between the veterinarian and the assistant, as well as smoother job training of veterinary assistants. Their scope of practice remains limited and equal to many on the job trained staff. Local laws restrict what activities a veterinary assistant may perform, as some procedures may only be legally completed by a licensed veterinary technician, including IV anesthesia induction, oral surgery, splinting and casting, and in some states, administering the rabies vaccine.

== History ==
Veterinarians have had assistance from staff throughout their existence of the profession, but the first organised paraveterinary workers were the canine nurses trained by the Canine Nurses Institute in 1908, and announced in the magazine 'The Veterinary Student'. According to the founder, they would "carry out directions of the veterinary surgeon, meet a genuine need on the part of the dog owners, and at the same time provide a reasonably paid occupation for young women with a real liking for animals".

In 1913, the Ruislip Dog Sanatorium was founded, and employed nurses to care for unwell dogs and in the 1920s, at least one veterinary surgery in Mayfair employed qualified human nurses to tend the animals. In the mid-1930s, the early veterinary nurses approached the Royal College of Veterinary Surgeons for official recognition, and in 1938 the Royal Veterinary College had a head nurse appointed, but the official recognition was not given until 1957, first as veterinary nurses, but changed within a year to Royal Animal Nursing Auxiliaries (RANAs) following objection from the human nursing profession.

In 1951, the first formal paraveterinary role was created by the United States Air Force who introduced veterinary technicians, and this was followed in 1961 by a civilian programme at the State University of New York (SUNY) Agricultural and Technical College. In 1965 Walter Collins, DVM received federal funding to develop model curricula for training technicians. He produced several guides over the next seven years, and for this work he is considered the "father of veterinary technology" in the United States.

In 1984, the term veterinary nurse was formally restored to paraveterinary workers in the United Kingdom.

== Role and responsibilities ==
Veterinary Technician Code of Ethics

1.Veterinary technicians shall aid society and animals by providing excellent care and services for animals.

2. Veterinary technicians shall prevent and relieve the suffering of animals with competence and compassion.

3. Veterinary technicians shall remain competent through commitment to life-long learning.

4. Veterinary technicians shall promote public health by assisting with the control of zoonotic diseases and educating the public about these diseases.

5. Veterinary technicians shall collaborate with other members of the veterinary medical profession in efforts to ensure quality health care services for all animals.

6. Veterinary technicians shall protect confidential information provided by clients, unless required by law or to protect public health.

7. Veterinary technicians shall assume accountability for individual professional actions and judgments.

8. Veterinary technicians shall safeguard the public and the profession against individuals deficient in professional competence or ethics.

9. Veterinary technicians shall assist with efforts to ensure conditions of employment consistent with the excellent care for animals.

10. Veterinary technicians shall uphold the laws/regulations that apply to the technician's responsibilities as a member of the animal health care team.

11. Veterinary technicians shall represent their credentials or identify themselves with specialty organizations only if the designation has been awarded or earned.

The scope of practice for paraveterinary workers varies by jurisdiction, and by qualification level. In some places, more than one grade of paraveterinary worker exists. For instance, in the United Kingdom there are both veterinary nurses, who are qualified professionals with a protected title, and veterinary assistants, who do not have a single level of qualification which they must attain, and whose title is not protected. Furthermore, job roles may be divided further into roles such as Veterinary Surgical Technician, Veterinary Emergency and Critical Care Technician, Veterinary Technician Anesthesia Specialist, etc.

In the United States, veterinary technicians can become registered both nationally and by their state of residence by taking board exams. Not all states require a state test. States that license veterinary technicians include Alaska, Alabama, Delaware, Georgia, Michigan, Nebraska, Nevada, New York, North Dakota, Tennessee, Texas, Virginia, and Washington. Once they are registered, they are allowed to perform certain tasks with or without the supervision of another professional. In order to keep their skills and knowledge up to par, some states require registered technicians to engage in continued education before renewing their license.

At the higher levels, veterinary nurses or technicians may be able to practice skills autonomously, including examinations and minor surgery on animals, without the direct supervision of other professionals.

Paraveterinary workers are likely to assist other professionals, or perform by themselves, medical skills such as observations (e.g. taking and recording pulse, temperature, respiration etc.), wound and trauma management (e.g. cleaning and dressing wounds, applying splints etc.), physical interventions (e.g. catheterizations, ear flushes and venipuncture) and preparing and analysing biological samples (e.g. performing skin scrapings, microbiology, urinalysis, and microscopy). Most Paravetrinary workers can also do imagining, take labs, do patient prep for surgeries, record and update patient records and under Veterinarian supervision can do client relations such as examining a patient. Paraveterinary workers are able to do all of these things due to them passing their licenseing exams, typically some of the only things a Paraveterinary worker cannot do is prescribe medication and perform surgeries.

Dependent on their scope of practice and training, they may also be called upon to operate diagnostic screening equipment, including electrocardiographic, radiographic and ultrasonographic instruments, including complex machines such as computed tomography, magnetic resonance imagers and gamma cameras. In veterinary hospitals, veterinary technicians can perform complete blood counts, differential counts, and morphologic examinations of blood.

Veterinary technicians commonly assist other professionals in surgery by providing correct equipment and instruments and by assuring that monitoring and support equipment are in good working condition. They may also maintain treatment records and inventory of all pharmaceuticals, equipment and supplies, and help with other administrative tasks within a veterinary practice, such as client education.

Client education plays a key role of the veterinary technician's responsibilities, such as effectively communicating complex medical instructions in a positive and understandable way, and to facilitate the patient's care as an intermediary between the doctor, hospital and the patient. In this way, open lines of communication are established that can benefit the patient and hospital.

== Education and qualification ==
The level of education of a paraveterinary worker will depend on the role they are performing, and the veterinary medico-legal framework for the area in which they are working. Many areas employ veterinary assistants, who have a simple role to directly assist other professionals, and may hold no formal qualification or training, or have been trained on the job.

Higher level paraveterinary workers, such as veterinary nurses or veterinary technicians, who have a scope of autonomous practice which they are expected to perform without instruction, are likely to have both formal qualifications and in many jurisdictions will also require a formal registration with a monitoring body.

In countries where the role of veterinary workers is most advanced, the qualification required is likely to be based in higher education, such as in the United States or Canada where veterinary technicians must normally gain an associate degree at an institution recognised by the American Veterinary Medical Association or Canadian Veterinary Medical Association, and can choose to study for an extended period to gain a bachelor's degree (which in America may confer the title 'technologist', rather than 'technician'), or the United Kingdom, where veterinary nurses enter the profession through either a two-year diploma programmer or through completion of a foundation degree or honours degree.

In almost all cases, regardless of the level of formalized training, a high level of practical experience is usually required prior to a student being fully qualified, which may be completed as part of their course, or during a post-qualification period. This may require maintenance of a log of all work completed, which may need to be signed by a supervising professional (such as the vet or senior member of the veterinary staff) to indicate competence. In some cases, such as in the United States, video records may be required of some procedures, which may then be examined by the awarding or registration body.

Many countries, including the United Kingdom, Canada, and parts of the United States, restrict some elements of practice, and may restrict use of the recognised name, to those people currently registered with an appropriate licensing body, meaning that it would be illegal for any person not on the register to represent themselves as a paraveterinary worker, or to perform some of the procedures that a licensed professional could. The precise details of these restrictions vary widely between legal areas, and neighbouring areas may have different policies, as is the case in the various states of the US.

This licensing body may have its own requirements for maintaining a registration, and those who hold the requisite academic qualification may still have to complete a further range of exams or tests to become registered. For instance, in the United States, most areas use the Veterinary Technician National Exam, and this will be used by the state licensing authority (such as a state veterinary medical association) to qualify an applicant to become a registered veterinary technician.

In some cases, those people who qualified before the introduction of formal academic qualification requirements may still be working as paraveterinary workers, and may still be entered on a required register through the use of grandfather rights. For instance, in some states of the US, people with a set number of years or hours of experience assisting other professionals could sit for the Veterinary Technician National Exam, however this route was phased out in 2011, and future candidates must have an academic qualification.

=== Specialty certification ===
Beyond credentialing as a veterinary technician specialty certification is also available to technicians with advanced skills. To date there are specialty recognitions in: emergency & critical care, anesthesiology, dentistry, small animal internal medicine, large animal internal medicine, cardiology, oncology, neurology, zoological medicine, equine veterinary nursing, surgery, behavior, nutrition, clinical practice (canine/feline, exotic companion animal, and production animal sub-specialties) and clinical pathology. Veterinary Technician Specialists carry the additional post-nominal letters "VTS" with their particular specialties indicated in parentheses. As veterinary technology evolves more specialty academy recognitions are anticipated. Since the COVID pandemic, more institutions have been offering these veterinary tech certifications via online classes.

The need for veterinary assistants will continue to rise as pet ownership in the United States is growing. Responsible pet ownership and animal safety becoming more significant's contributing to the increasing demand. According to the U.S. Department of Labor, the number of veterinary assistant jobs is expected to grow up to 19% by 2026, much faster than the average career.

== Global presence ==
Attempts at professional solidarity resulted in the creation of the International Veterinary Nurses and Technicians Association (IVNTA) in 1993. Its members currently include Australia, Canada, Ireland, Japan, Malta, Nepal, New Zealand, Norway, Pakistan, Spain, Turkey, the United Kingdom, and the United States. In 2007 the Accreditation Committee for Veterinary Nurse Education (ACOVENE) was established in an attempt to standardize veterinary technology education throughout the European Union and to allow movement of veterinary nurses educated in one member nation to employment in another. On the specialty front, the Swiss-based organization VASTA (Veterinär Anästhesie Schule für TechnikerInnen und ArzthelferInnen -- Veterinary Anaesthesia School for Technicians and Assistants) is a six module year-long program that is approved by the Association of Veterinary Anaesthetists (AVA), the European College of Veterinary Anaesthesia and Analgesia (ECVAA), the International Veterinary Academy of Pain Management (IVAPM), and that has applied for RACE (Registry of Approved Continuing Education) approval in the United States ("Assistants" in the VASTA title refers to assistant or junior veterinarians and not to unqualified veterinary assistants). Its instructors include diplomates of the ECVAA, nurse anesthetists from the human medical field, neurologists, and veterinary physical therapists. It is currently offered in Germany, Austria, and the German-speaking regions of Switzerland. It has previously been offered in the French-speaking region of Switzerland but is currently on hiatus there due to low participation. Courses are planned for the US and the UK in 2012. Successful completion of the course results in the awarding of the post-nominal letters VAT (Veterinary Anaesthesia Technician).

== See also ==
- Veterinary physician
- Veterinary medicine
- Veterinary surgeon

By country

- Paraveterinary workers in Australia
- Paraveterinary workers in Belgium
- Paraveterinary workers in Denmark
- Paraveterinary workers in France
- Paraveterinary workers in Ireland
- Paraveterinary workers in Italy
- Paraveterinary workers in Japan
- Paraveterinary workers in New Zealand
- Paraveterinary workers in Norway
- Paraveterinary workers in South Africa
- Paraveterinary workers in Sweden
- Paraveterinary workers in Switzerland
- Paraveterinary workers in Thailand
- Paraveterinary workers in Turkey
- Veterinary medicine in the United Kingdom
- Veterinary medicine in the United States
