= Sandvik (surname) =

Sandvik is a surname. Notable persons with that name include:

- Astrid Sandvik (born 1939), Norwegian Alpine skier
- Fredmund Sandvik (1951–2024), Norwegian politician
- Gro Sandvik (born 1942), Norwegian flautist
- Harald Sandvik (1911–1992), Norwegian military officer
- Helge Sandvik (born 1990), Norwegian footballer
- Hilde Sandvik (born 1970), Norwegian journalist
- Ingrid Sandvik (1921–1976) Norwegian politician
- Johannes Ø. Sandvik (1894–1978), Norwegian agronomist and civil servant
- Marit Sandvik (born 1956), Norwegian jazz singer
- Olav Sandvik (1925–2010), Norwegian veterinarian and civil servant
- Ole Mørk Sandvik (1875–1976), Norwegian educator
- Ossi Sandvik (born 1953), Finnish politician
- Pål Thonstad Sandvik (born 1967), Norwegian historian
- Paul Knutsen Barstad Sandvik (1847–1936), Norwegian educator and musician
- Runa Sandvik, Norwegian computer security expert
- Tore Sandvik, Norwegian orienteer
- Tore O. Sandvik (born 1969), Norwegian politician

== See also ==
- Sandvik (disambiguation)
