= Kåre Fossum =

Norwegian veterinarian (born 1936)

Kåre Fossum (born 19 September 1936) is a Norwegian veterinarian.

He was hired at the Norwegian School of Veterinary Science in 1961. He started as a research assistant, then became associate professor, then professor of microbiology and immunology from 1975. He served as the rector of the Norwegian School of Veterinary Science from 1989 to 1992, with assistance from prorector Knut Rønningen. From 1973 to 1975, he was a guest professor at the Department of Public Health, Pharmacology and Toxicology at the University of Nairobi, and he has also been director of the Veterinærmedisinsk senter in Tromsø. In 1995, he was hired at the National Veterinary Institute.

He is a member of the Norwegian Academy of Science and Letters. In 2005, he was decorated with the King's Medal of Merit in gold.

He resides in Nordstrand, Oslo.

Academic offices
Preceded by Reidar Birkeland	Rector of the Norwegian School of Veterinary Science; 1989–1992	Succeeded by Knut Karlberg
