= Robert Rooks =

Robert Rooks may refer to:

- Robert L. Rooks, American veterinarian
- Robert Rooks (organizer), chief executive officer of Reform Alliance
