= Paraveterinary workers in Norway =

Group of medical professions in Norway

Paraveterinary workers in Norway, known as "Dyrepleier", include veterinary nurses, veterinary technicians and veterinary assistants.

These workers are represented by the Norwegian Veterinary Nurse and Assistant Association (NDAF—Norsk dyrepleier- og assistentforening). The Norwegian veterinary nurse/technician education is a two-year university-level program taught exclusively at the Norwegian School of Veterinary Science. Prior to 2003 it was a one-year program followed by one year of practical experience.

Nurse/technician graduates of the school must apply for an official authorisation issued from the Norwegian Food Safety Authority (Mattilsynet) in order to use the title "Dyrepleier".
