= Knut Karlberg =

Norwegian veterinarian (born 1947)

Knut Karlberg (born 19 September 1947) is a Norwegian veterinarian.

He was born in Oslo, and took the dr.med.vet. degree in 1981. He was hired at the Norwegian School of Veterinary Science in 1981, became professor of reproductional physiology in 1990, and served as rector there from 1993 to 1995.

Academic offices
| Preceded by Kåre Fossum | Rector of the Norwegian School of Veterinary Science; 1993–1995 | Succeeded by Hallstein Grønstøl |
