= Weiert Velle =

Norwegian veterinarian (1925–2007)

Weiert Martin Velle (18 May 1925 – 29 April 2007) was a Norwegian veterinarian.

He was born in Lista Municipality in southern Norway. He took the dr.med.vet. degree in 1959, and also the dr.philos. in 1999. He was a professor of physiology at the Norwegian School of Veterinary Science from 1965 to 1993, and served as rector there from 1975 to 1982. He co-edited the journal Acta Veterinaria Scandinavica from 1973 to 1987. He resided at Blommenholm and died in April 2007 in Bærum.

Academic offices
Preceded by Olav Sandvik	Rector of the Norwegian School of Veterinary Science; 1975–1982	Succeeded by Reidar Birkeland
