= Hans Fredrik Wirstad =

Norwegian veterinarian

Hans Fredrik Wirstad (16 June 1897 – 29 March 1983) was a Norwegian veterinarian.

He was born in Kristiania, and finished his education in Copenhagen in 1922. He was professor of surgery at the Norwegian School of Veterinary Science from 1937, and served as rector there from 1957 to 1966. He was decorated with the Royal Norwegian Order of St. Olav.

Academic offices
| Preceded by Henrik Edland | Rector of the Norwegian School of Veterinary Science; 1957–1966 | Succeeded by Rolf Rumohr |
