= Paraveterinary workers in Ireland =

Paraveterinary workers in Ireland, such as veterinary nurses, assist veterinary physicians, or carry out animal health procedures autonomously. Paraveterinary workers in Ireland have been represented by the Irish Veterinary Nursing Association (IVNA) since 2002, and prior to this were represented by the British Veterinary Nursing Association (BVNA) from the 1960s. The title "veterinary nurse" can only be used by those registered with the Veterinary Council of Ireland. The post-nominal letters used in Ireland are RVN (Registered Veterinary Nurse).

== Veterinary nursing ==
Veterinary nursing became a regulated profession in Ireland from January 2008, under the Veterinary Practice Act 2005. When the act was implemented in January 2008, unqualified staff working in veterinary practices before 2004 had a period of six months to apply for provisional registration which conferred the same rights and responsibilities as full membership. The provisional registration category ended on 31 December 2012.

Following the implementation of the Veterinary Practice Act in January 2008, no individual can legally perform veterinary nursing duties unless listed on the Register or is currently undertaking a course of formal education approved by the Veterinary Council.

Registered veterinary nurses must complete the required amount of continuing professional education each year to maintain their registration.

A 2016 survey found that the majority of registered veterinary nurses were women, and that the average age was 32.

=== Qualifications ===
There are five programmes of study which qualify one to become a veterinary nurse in Ireland, each sanctioned by the Veterinary Council of Ireland: the 2-year diploma course at St. John's Central College in Cork, the 3-year ordinary Bachelor of Science degrees in Athlone, Dundalk and Letterkenny Institutes of Technology and the 4-year higher (honours level) Bachelor of Science degree at University College Dublin. Qualifications gained outside of Ireland may be recognised by the Veterinary Council as being equivalent to Ireland's veterinary nursing qualifications.
