= Halfdan Holth =

Norwegian veterinarian

Halfdan Holth (1880 – 1950) was a Norwegian veterinarian.

He was born in Nordre Odalen Municipality in Hedmark county, Norway. He became a professor at the National Veterinary Institute in 1914, and managing director in 1917. From 1917 to 1930 he also edited the journal Norsk veterinærtidsskrift. He was later instrumental in the creation of the Norwegian School of Veterinary Science, and served as its first rector from 1936 to 1948.

Holth was also noted for his work to eliminate the diseases bovine tuberculosis and brucellosis, together with Niels Thorshaug and Lars Slagsvold.

Academic offices
New office	Rector of the Norwegian School of Veterinary Science; 1936–1948	Succeeded by Anton Johnson Brandt
