= Suzanne Saueressig =

- Born: February 4, 1925; Nuremberg, Germany
- Died: February 8, 2013 (aged 88); St. Louis, Missouri, United States
- Occupation: Humane Society of Missouri veterinary chief of staff
- Years active: 55 years
- Known for: First female practicing veterinarian
- Notable work: Ask the Pet Doctor

Suzanne Saueressig (February 4, 1925 – February 8, 2013) was the first practicing female veterinarian in Missouri. She was the Humane Society of Missouri's chief of staff for 55 years. She was born in Nuremberg, Germany and graduated from the Ludwig-Maximilians-Universität München's Veterinary College in 1953. She was the only woman in her class. She came to St. Louis, MO and was hired as a veterinarian for the Humane Society of Missouri. She insisted on raising the standards at her clinic, ensuring surgical instruments were sanitized properly, increasing cleanliness standards for the animals, and insisting on modern x-ray equipment. She was named their chief of staff ten years later in 1965. She is accredited with playing a major role in the Humane Society of Missouri's success. It is one of the largest operating practices in the Midwest today. She campaigned for spaying and neutering animals and had a column in the local newspaper to help educate and improve the local community. In 1972, she claimed the award of "Woman Veterinarian of the Year" by the national organization American Veterinary Medical Association.

== Early life and education ==
=== Early life ===
Saueressig was born in Nuremberg, Germany. She was the firstborn of four siblings. Her great-grandfather built their family home directly behind his construction building. Her early education was done at a Catholic school, despite her objections with the school dress code. Her love for animals started at a young age as she had cats and dogs as pets growing up. One day after her cat had gone missing, Saueressig suspected the maid as the cause. She placed mice in the maid's dresser and the cat reappeared the next day. At the age of 17, Saueressig enrolled in a typing class. The first session she attended the school was bombed. This moment led her to quit the typing program and instead pursue a career as a nurse. During her first semester in nursing school, she once again was involved in a bombing. This time she suffered a concussion. She and her classmates at the nursing school were drafted into the army. From 1945 to 1946 she was held as a prisoner of war by the United States in Nuremberg Germany. During this time, the Nuremberg Trials were taking place—the most notable being the Trial of Major War Criminals. During Hitler's reign, Nuremberg was a popular site for Nazi propaganda and rallies.

=== Veterinary education ===
Saueressig graduated from the Ludwig-Maximilians-Universität München's Veterinary College in 1953. She was the only woman among the 90 students in her graduating class. Despite this, her parents were not pleased at her choice to become a veterinarian. They believed working on animals was unbecoming for a young lady and that handling animals was dirty labor. After graduating, she did a year-long research study in an internship studying salmonella in mollusks. This earned her a master's degree magna cum laude after completing her doctoral dissertation in 1954 at the Ludwig-Maximilians-Universität München. During her schooling, the opportunity to work on large animals like horses was very limited due to World War II. Most of the horses in Germany belonged to aristocracy and were considered precious at the time.

== Career ==
Saueressig traveled to America to spend a year learning American veterinary methods. She moved to St. Louis and waited five years before being allowed to practice in the United States. First, she had to become a United States citizen and then become licensed by the state. After that, she was hired by the Humane Society of Missouri's clinic in 1955. At that time, the clinic was very small and had only a few other staff members. One of the staff members was a third year veterinary student named Richard Riegel. Riegel and Saueressig were married in 1956, while she was working her way to a higher position at the clinic. Soon after that, Saueressig was placed in charge of the facility. From the start, she insisted on raising the clinic's standards. She also insisted on sterile surgery equipment, using modern day technologies such as x-ray equipment, and clean cages. She would hide small newspaper comics on the bottom of animals' cages overnight and check to make sure they were removed the next morning as a way to ensure the staff was properly cleaning the cages. She is accredited with being the primary reason the Humane Society of Missouri's clinic is one of the largest in the Midwest today. The facility now annually receives around 80,000 patients and performs 17,00 surgeries. She became chief of staff in 1965 and used her authority to continue to expand the facility and raise the standards.

== Other achievements ==
Saueressig was very involved in improving her community. She was an advocate for the spaying and neutering of pets and had a campaign to raise public awareness for the project. She served on veterinary and community organizations and mentored many successful veterinarians. She had a column in the newspaper St. Louis Globe-Democrat titled Ask the Pet Doctor, which ran weekly from 1979 to 1985. She answered many community member's questions about their pet's care and helped spread awareness this way.

== Awards ==
She received the national award "Woman Veterinarian of the Year" from the Women's Veterinary Medical Association in 1972. The organization transitioned into a foundation, Association for Women Veterinarians Foundation, and continues its awards and scholarships through the American Veterinary Medicine Association.

Her community recognized her hard work in 1983 by naming her as Leader of Distinction, and she was added to the YWCA Metro St. Louis Academy of Leaders.

== Legacy ==
Saueressig died on February 8, 2013. She did not leave any children behind. Her husband died two months later on April 30, 2013. She was a mentor to many veterinarians and an inspiration to her supporters.

Kathy Warnick, the president of the Humane Society of Missouri at the time of Saueressig's death, accredited Saueressig with providing care to over a million pets in need.

== See also ==
- History of Veterinary Medicine
- American Veterinary Medical Association
- List of Veterinarians
- Veterinary Education
