= Slagsvold =

Slagsvold is a Norwegian surname. Notable people with the surname include:

- Baard Slagsvold (born 1963), Norwegian musician
- Lars Slagsvold (1887–1959), Norwegian veterinarian
- Tore Slagsvold (born 1947), Norwegian zoologist
