= Niels Thorshaug =

Norwegian veterinarian (1875–1942)

Niels Thorshaug (21 November 1875 – 9 October 1942) was a Norwegian veterinarian.

He was born in Løiten Municipality in Hedmark county. He was hired as district veterinary there in 1903, then became a consultant of the state in 1919. From 1926 to 1941 he headed the State Animal Authority. He was also instrumental in the creation of the Norwegian School of Veterinary Science.

Holth was also noted for stopping several outbreaks of foot-and-mouth disease, as well as his work to eliminate the diseases bovine tuberculosis and brucellosis, together with Halfdan Holth and Lars Slagsvold.
