= Sandvika (disambiguation) =

Sandvika may refer to the following locations:

== Places ==
- Sandvika, the administrative centre of Bærum municipality in Akershus county, Norway
  - Sandvika Station, a railway station in Sandvika in Bærum municipality in Akershus county, Norway
  - Sandvika Storsenter, a regional mall in Sandvika in Bærum municipality in Akershus county, Norway
  - Sandvika Tunnel, a road tunnel in Sandvika in Bærum municipality in Akershus county, Norway
- Sandvika, Agder, a village in Tvedestrand municipality in Agder county, Norway
- Sandvika, Frøya, a village in Frøya municipality in Trøndelag county, Norway
- Sandvika, Innlandet, a village in Stange municipality in Innlandet county, Norway
- Sandvika, Lierne, a village in Lierne municipality in Trøndelag county, Norway
- Sandvika, Nordland, a village in Gildeskål municipality in Nordland county, Norway

== See also ==
- Sandvik (disambiguation)
- Sandviken (disambiguation)
