= Sandviken (disambiguation) =

Sandviken may refer to:

== Places ==
=== Finland ===
- Hietalahti, Helsinki (known as "Sandviken" in Swedish), a neighbourhood in Helsinki, Finland
- Hietalahti Stadium (known as "Sandviken Stadium" in Swedish), a stadium in Vaasa, Finland

=== Norway ===
- Sandviken, Norway, a neighbourhood in the city of Bergen in Vestland county

=== Sweden ===
- Sandviken, a town and the seat of Sandviken municipality
- Sandviken Municipality, a municipality around the town of Sandviken
- Sandviken, Södertälje, a village in Södertälje municipality
- Sandviken, Blekinge, a beach in Sweden

== Sports ==
- Sandvikens IF, a Swedish football club
- Sandvikens AIK, a Swedish sports club
- IL Sandviken, a Norwegian sports club

== See also ==
- Sandvik, a global company founded in Sandviken, Sweden
- Sandvika (disambiguation)
