= Veterinary Council of Ireland =

The Veterinary Council of Ireland, (Irish: Comhairle na dTreidlia), is a statutory body, the principal function which is to regulate and manage the practice of veterinary medicine and veterinary nursing in Ireland in the public interest. The enabling legislation is the Veterinary Practice Act (SI 22/2005). The council is made up of nineteen members, of which nine are elected veterinary practitioners, one is an elected veterinary nurse, and nine are appointed nominees of:

- Minister of Agriculture, Fisheries and Food – four members,
- Minister for Education and Science – one member
- National University of Ireland – two members
- Director of Consumer Affairs – one member
- Food Safety Authority – one member.

The council is located on Lansdowne Road, Ballsbridge, Dublin.

== World Veterinary Year ==
In 2011, World Veterinary Year marked 250 years since the establishment of the first veterinary school in France. To celebrate this, the Veterinary Council of Ireland hosted a ceremony on 14 February 2011 in the Royal Dublin Society Concert Hall. One hundred and forty veterinary surgeons who had served the profession on the island of Ireland over the past 50 or more years, including twelve from Northern Ireland, were awarded commemorative medals. The President of Ireland, Mary McAleese, handed the medals to the long-serving veterinary surgeons, including 98 year old Jack Powell, a 1936 graduate.
