= Anton Johnson Brandt =

Norwegian veterinarian (1893–1951)

Anton Johnson Brandt (21 March 1893 – 14 October 1951) was a Norwegian veterinarian.

He was born in Nesseby Municipality in Finnmark county, Norway. He was a professor of pathological anatomy at the Norwegian School of Veterinary Science from 1941 to 1951, and rector there from 1948 to 1951. He edited the journal Norsk veterinærtidsskrift from 1931 to 1949, and co-edited Nordisk veterinærmedicin from 1948 to 1951.

Academic offices
| Preceded by Halfdan Holth | Rector of the Norwegian School of Veterinary Science; 1948–1951 | Succeeded by Henrik Edland |
