= Hermaphrodite (Nadar) =

1860 series of photographs by Nadar

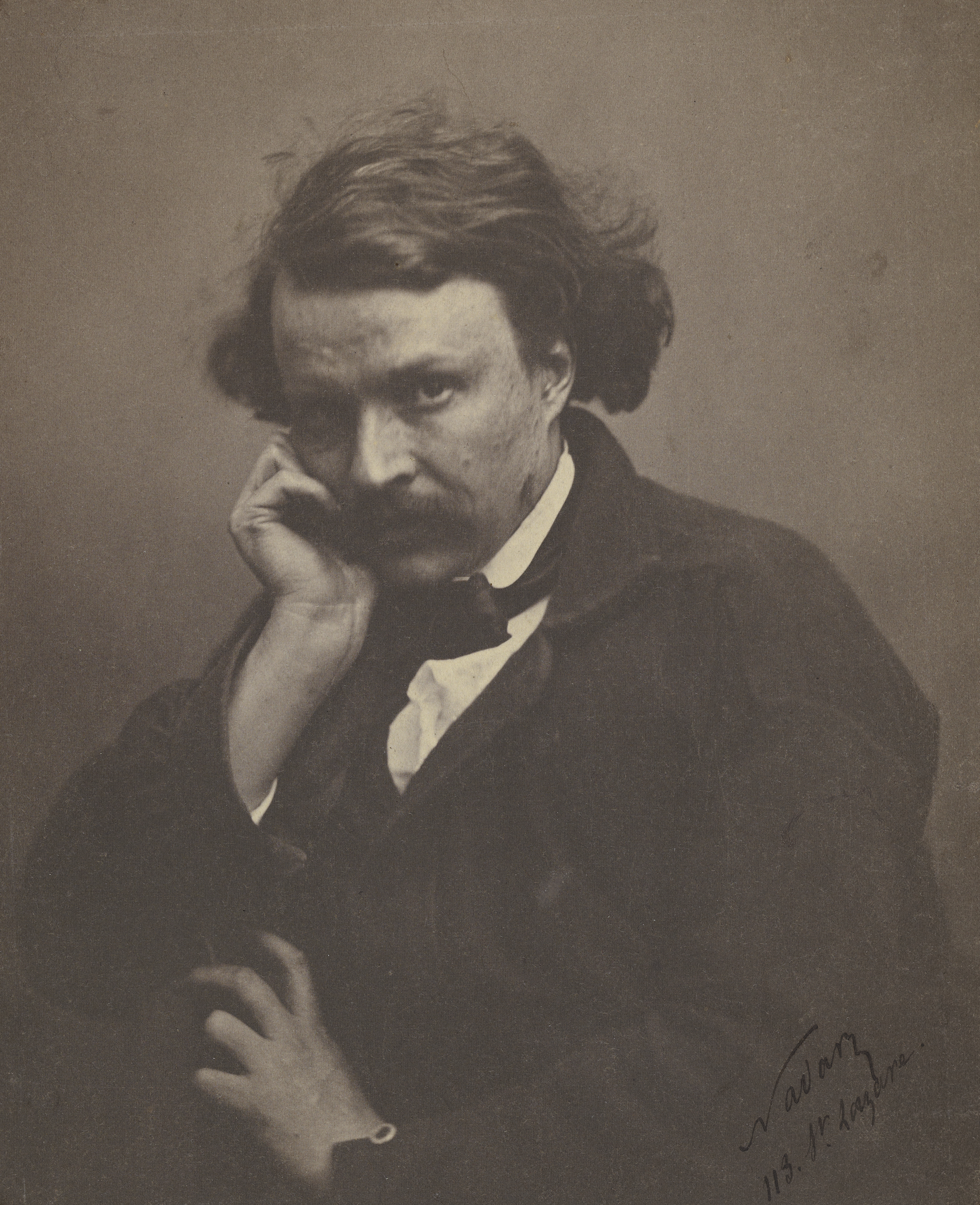
Nadar, the photographer

Hermaphrodite is a series of photographs of a young intersex person, who had a male build and stature and may have been assigned female or self-identified as female, taken by the French photographer Nadar (real name Gaspard-Félix Tournachon) in 1860. Possibly commissioned by Armand Trousseau, the nine photographs have been described as "probably the first medical photo-illustrations of a patient with intersex genitalia". They were originally restricted for scientific uses, and Nadar did not publish them. Further photographs of intersex subjects followed over the next several decades, although there is no evidence that the photographers knew of Nadar's work.

== Background ==
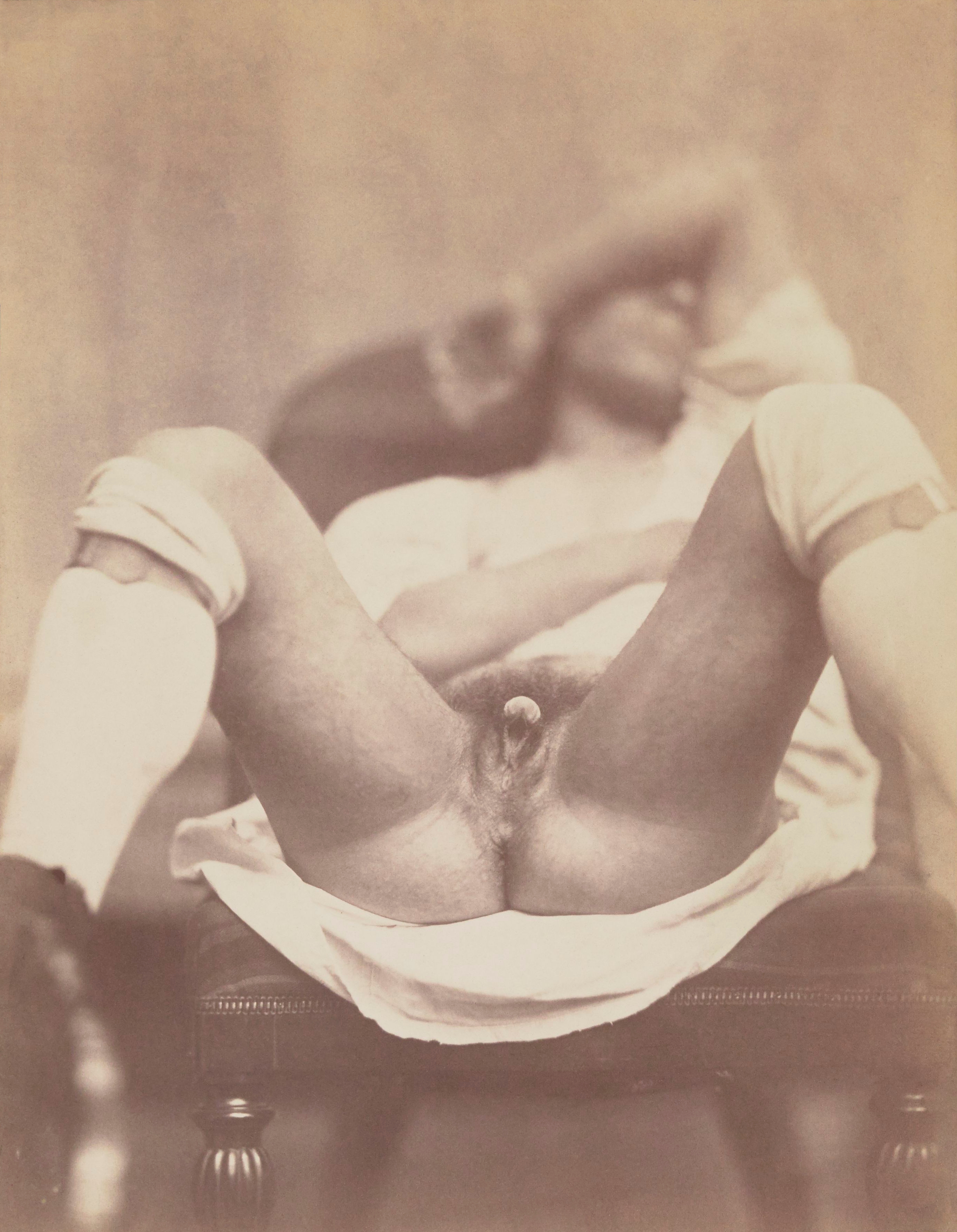
One of the images from the Bibliothèque Nationale de France set.

Nadar (1820–1910), the son of a publisher, had previously had medical training in Lyon and at Hôtel-Dieu. However, by the late 1830s he had left medicine to focus on the printed press, becoming a caricaturist, journalist, and novelist. He only began photography in 1854, but by the end of that decade he was well known for his portraits of famous persons and advances in photographic techniques.

Although developed several decades earlier, photography was rarely used for medical documentation until the 1850s. In the mid-1850s France, at the request of neurologist Duchenne de Boulogne, photographer Adrien Tournachon documented experiments in which facial muscles were electrically stimulated; another example of clinical photography was documented by German physician Hermann Wolff Berend in an 1855 journal article entitled "Ueber die Benutzung der Lichtbilder für heilwissenschaftliche Zwecke" ("On the Use of Photographs for Therapeutic Research Purposes").

Several years later, in late 1860, Tournachon's elder brother Nadar took a series of nine photographs of a young intersex person, possibly on commission by Armand Trousseau; This commission is suggested by an undated letter from Trousseau to Nadar, in which the former requests help in the documentation of a subject with a "very strange malady", to be done "with as much truth and art as you can." The subject was to be brought to Nadar by one of Trousseau's friends, a Doctor Dumont-Pallier; the surgeon Jules Germain François Maisonneuve was also present.

== Subject ==
The subject of the series, whose name was never released, was an intersex person with a male build and stature, but who may have self-identified as female and/or been assigned female at birth. The subject had a small, probably hypospadic, penis, rudimentary scrotum, and male pubic hair pattern. The subject also had a retracted or rudimentary clitoral hood and vaginal opening. In most photographs, the subject's face and chest are covered.

== Series ==
The series consists of nine photographs documenting the subject in various poses and angles. Anna Blume, writing in the journal LTTR, describes the images as quite different from Nadar's other work; she writes that Nadar, whose normal portraits captured a personality and personage, instead focused on "a body and specifically of the genitals of this body".

These include two images that show the subject standing. One captures a full-length view, in which the subject is unclothed except for a pair of stockings and shoes. In the other, the subject's right leg is raised to provide a clearer view of the genitalia. Another image presents the subject lying back with one arm covering the face while someone else's hand pulls on the penile tissue. A similar photograph shows the subject in an examination position, with a hand – visible in the uncut photographic plate as belonging to Maisonneuve – spreading the vaginal lips. The series also includes a close-up of the subject's genitalia, with the legs open.

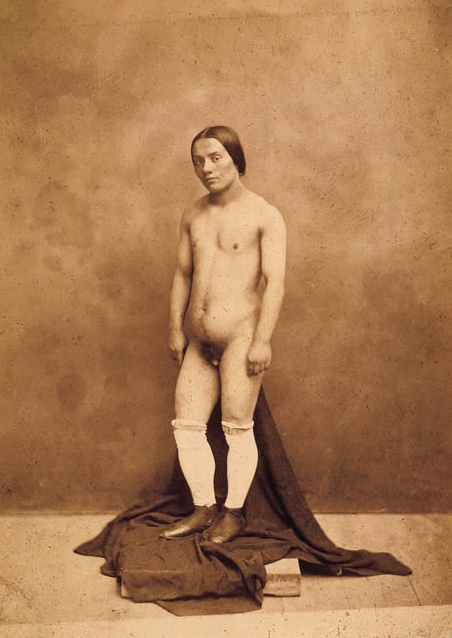

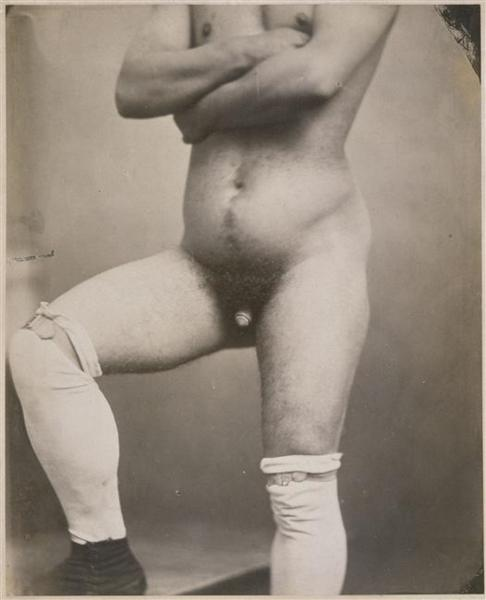

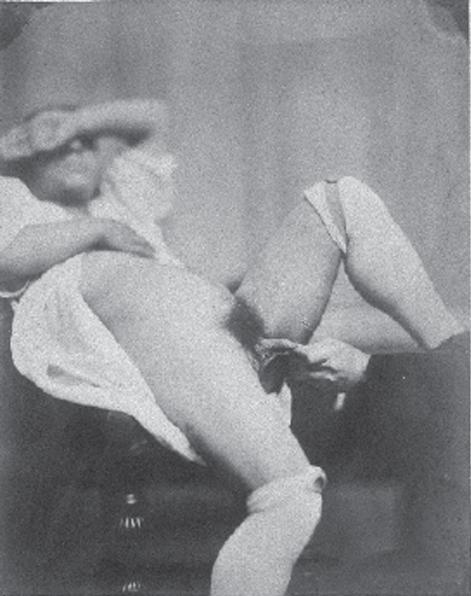

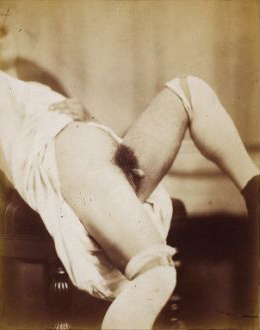

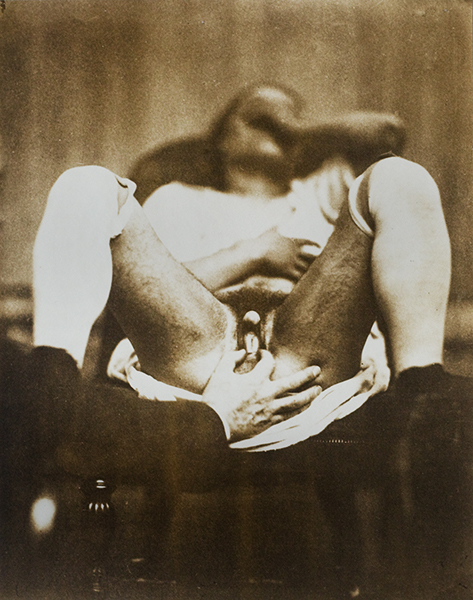

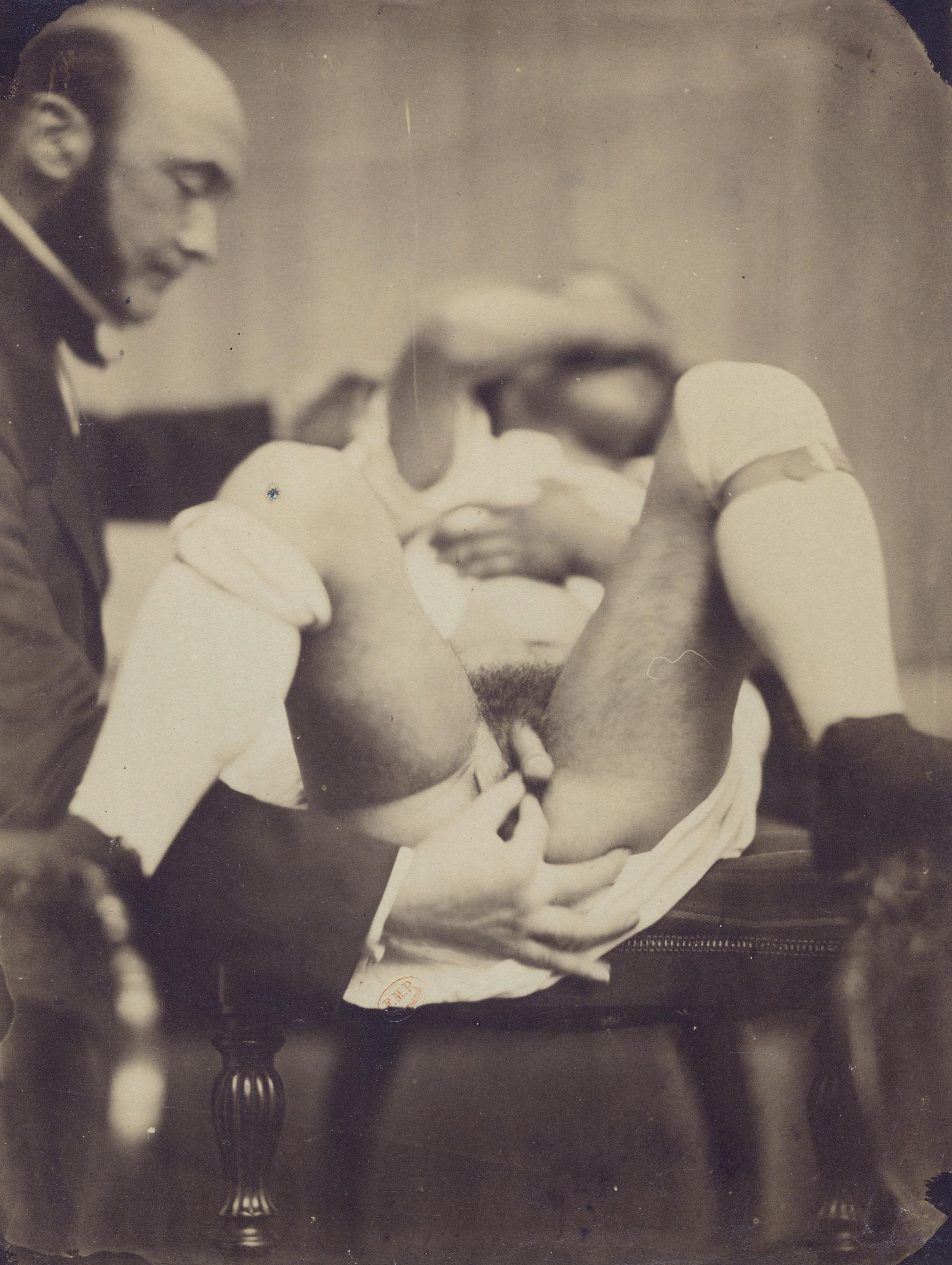

== Post-photography ==
Nadar did not publish the photographs, but in 1861, he copyrighted them – something he almost never did – and limited them to scientific uses, excluding public display. In The Journal of Sexual Medicine, Dirk Schultheiss, Thomas R.W. Herrmann, and Udo Jonas suggest that the photographs are "probably the first medical photo-illustrations of a patient with intersex genitalia" and describe them as a "milestone in the history of sexual medicine".

According to Schultheiss, Herrmann, and Jonas, although Trousseau had earlier suggested that surgery was a viable option, there is no evidence that the subject subsequently received treatment; They suggest several possible factors, including legal issues, the subject's refusal, or failed treatment followed by a lack of reporting, for the lack of surgery or evidence of such. Maisonneuve, partially shown in one of the photographs, treated another intersex patient in 1862.

Several photographs are at the Musée d'Orsay in Paris, and at least one is at the Metropolitan Museum of Art (MET) in New York. The MET occasionally puts the photographs on display with other Nadar works; a 1995 exhibition featured two of the series.

== Legacy ==
Medical photography continued to develop, both in France and abroad, after the Nadar images were shot. In Europe, several further cases of intersexuality were documented, although there is no evidence that the photographers were aware of Nadar's work. In April 1870, a Monsieur Delacroix presented photographs of an intersex individual at the Société Médicale de Reims. In 1930 German physician Magnus Hirschfeld published a portrait of himself with an intersex individual in his five-volume Geschlechtskunde (Sexology), while Louis Ombrédanne published 25 images of cases he had handled in his 1939 book Les hermaphrodites et la chirurgie (Hermaphrodites and Surgery).
