= World Veterinary Year 2011 =

250th anniversary celebration

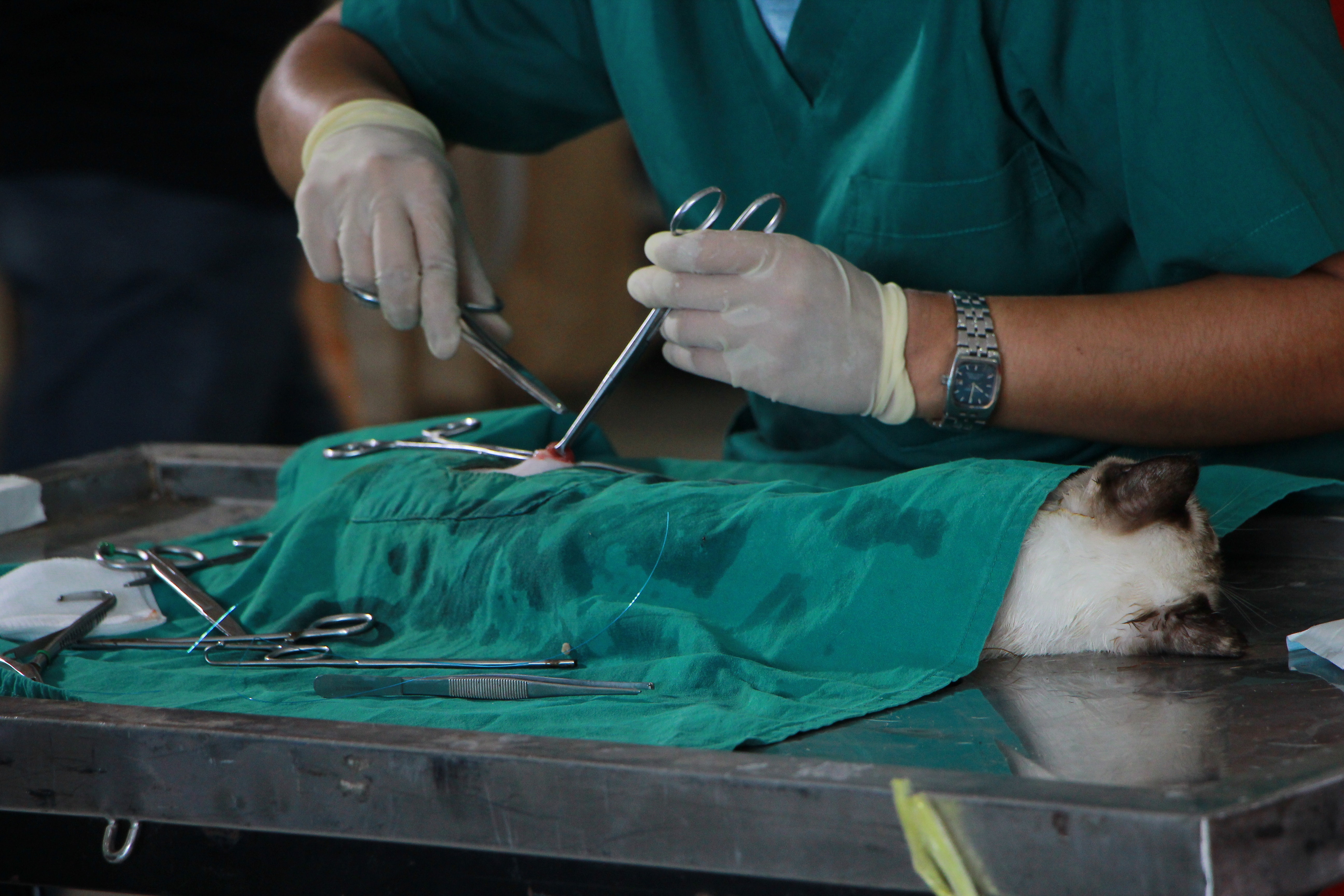
A veterinarian performing surgery on a cat.

World Veterinary Year was celebrated in 2011, in recognition of the 250th anniversary of the founding of the world's first veterinary school in Lyon, France, in 1761. World Veterinary Year was officially launched on 24 January 2011 in Versailles, France. The slogan was "Vet for health, Vet for food, Vet for the planet!"

The United States Congress proclaimed 2011 as World Veterinary Year, following a proposal by Senators John Ensign and Kurt Schrader, both veterinarians.

The World Organisation for Animal Health (OIE) and DG SANCO held a photography competition early in 2011 entitled "Vets in your daily life" as part of World Veterinary Year 2011. The competition was won by Indian photographer Somenath Mukhopadhyay, with a photograph of a veterinarian taking the temperature of a goat affected by peste des petits ruminants.

== Selected celebrations ==
- 24 January 2011: Official Opening Ceremony of World Veterinary Year (Versailles, France)
- February 2011: Veterinary Council of Ireland hosted a ceremony awarding medals to veterinary surgeons who had practiced for over 50 years.
- 12–16 May 2011: World conference on veterinary education (Lyon, France).
- 17 July 2011: Symposium "World Veterinary Year: 250 Years of Improving Animal and Human Health" at the American Veterinary Medical Association Convention (St. Louis, Missouri, United States).
- 10–14 October 2011: International Closing Ceremony (Cape Town, South Africa), alongside the 30th World Veterinary Conference.

== See also ==
- List of awareness years
