= Olav Sandvik =

Norwegian veterinarian and civil servant

Olav Sandvik (2 November 1925 – 16 February 2010) was a Norwegian veterinarian and civil servant.

He was born in Fana as a son of Johannes Ø. Sandvik. He finished his secondary education in 1945 and graduated from the Norwegian School of Veterinary Science in 1953. From 1951 to 1952 he served in the Norwegian field hospital in the Korean War. He was a research fellow at the Norwegian School of Veterinary Science from 1953, and took the dr.med.vet. degree in 1963.

He was an associate professor from 1958 and professor of microbiology and immunology from 1963, and served as prorector from 1969 and rector from 1972. He left the School of Veterinary Science in 1975. He was then managing director of the National Veterinary Institute from 1975 to 1983. He served as a director in the Ministry of Agriculture from 1983 to 1990, and advisor there from 1990 to 1994.

He chaired the Norwegian Society for Microbiology from 1966 to 1968, and the NLVF from 1970 to 1971 (having been a council member since 1964 and deputy chair from 1968 to 1969).

For his service in Korea he was also decorated with the United Nations Korea Medal and the Korean War Service Medal. He was a member of the Norwegian Academy of Science and Letters since 1973, a member of the Royal Swedish Academy of Agriculture and Forestry, and an honorary member of the Finnish Veterinary Association. He was decorated as a Knight of the Order of St. Olav and the Order of the Falcon, and a Commander of the Order of the Polar Star.

He lived in Bærum during his professional career, then in Larvik in his later life. He died in February 2010.

Academic offices
Preceded by Rolf Rumohr	Rector of the Norwegian School of Veterinary Science; 1972–1975	Succeeded by Weiert Velle
