= Paraveterinary workers in Japan =

Veterinary support personnel in Japan do not currently hold any official state recognition and are known under a variety of equivalent names. Credentialing is carried out by various private organizations. These organizations are the Japan Animal Health Technicians Association (JAHTA), the Japanese Animal Hospital Association (JAHA), the Japan Small Animal Veterinary Association (JSAVA), the All Japan Veterinary Co-operative (JVC), and the Japanese Society of Animal Nursing. The Japanese Veterinary Nurses & Technicians Association (JVNTA), a non-certifying body which closed in 2007, was one of the original member organizations of the IVNTA. In 2009 the Japanese Veterinary Nursing Association (JVNA) was organized as an effort to unify and standardize the profession in Japan and to seek state recognition. The JVNA, which has the support of the Japanese Veterinary Medical Association (JVMA—the national organization for veterinarians), may serve only as a temporary vehicle towards a single permanent national certifying body. All of the organizations have been collaborating since 2010 as the Council for Veterinary Nursing Examination and have reached an agreement to share a common examination in February 2012. In the meantime, a new organization, supported by the Ministry of Agriculture, Forestry, and Fisheries; the JVMA; and the JVNA has been tasked with developing a nationally sanctioned unified exam, the first of which was scheduled to be given in February 2013. Education lacks uniformity but in most cases consists of two- to three-year programs. A council of universities for animal nursing was also established and tasked with building a core curriculum for veterinary nursing. The council is made up of: Yamazaki Gakuen University, Nippon Veterinary and Life Science University, Kurashiki University of Science and the Arts, Teikyo University of Science, and Rakuno Gakuen University.
