= Lars Slagsvold =

Norwegian veterinarian (1887–1959)

Lars Magnussen Slagsvold (24 April 1887 – 2 September 1959) was a Norwegian veterinarian.

He was born in Romedal Municipality as a son of farmer Magnus Slagsvold (1854–1921) and Inger Krogstie (1855–1924). He finished his education in 1909 in Copenhagen. After several years of practice he was hired as a head of department in the National Veterinary Institute in 1924. He was a professor at the Norwegian School of Veterinary Science from 1936 to 1946, and from 1946 to 1957 he headed the State Animal Authority.

Slagsvold was also noted for his work to eliminate the diseases bovine tuberculosis and brucellosis, together with Niels Thorshaug and Halfdan Holth. Slagsvold was decorated as a Knight, 1st Class of the Order of St. Olav in 1951 and he was also held the Order of the Dannebrog (Commander) and the Order of the White Rose of Finland.
