= Omega Tau Sigma =

Veterinary medicine professional fraternity

- ΩΤΣ
- Founded: 1906; 120 years ago University of Pennsylvania School of Veterinary Medicine
- Type: Professional
- Affiliation: Independent
- Former affiliation: PFA
- Status: Active
- Emphasis: Veterinary Medicine
- Scope: International
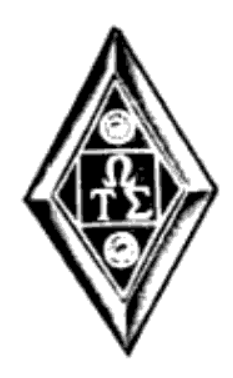
- Member badge
- Colors: Maroon and Navy blue
- Flower: White carnation
- Jewel: Pearl
- Publication: Shroud
- Chapters: 14
- Headquarters: Omega Tau Sigma; PO Box 876; Ithaca, New York 14851-0876; United States
- Website: www.omegatausigma.org

Omega Tau Sigma (ΩΤΣ) is an international veterinary medicine professional fraternity. It formed at the University of Pennsylvania School of Veterinary Medicine in 1906.

== History ==
Omega Tau Sigma was founded by several students in veterinary medicine at the University of Pennsylvania School of Veterinary Medicine in Philadelphia, Pennsylvania in 1906. Its purpose is to encourage and foster "the development of well-rounded, ethical veterinarians and through them creates a better profession based on friendship, cooperation, and respect for their fellow professional." Its charter members were Howard H. Curtis, Gerrit P. Judd, William A. Haines, Frank E. Lentz, E. A. Parker Jr., and George A. Schwartz.

It soon opened additional chapters at other colleges of veterinary medicine. In 1911, Beta chapter was established at the New York State College of Veterinary Medicine at Cornell University in Ithaca and Gamma at the Ohio State University College of Veterinary Medicine. The fraternity went international in 1914 with the chartering of Delta chapter at Ontario Veterinary College on the campus of University of Guelph in Guelph, Ontario. It eventually spread to fifteen veterinary schools in the United States along with the branch in Canada.

The first meeting of its governing body, the Grand Chapter, was held on April 1, 1911, in Philadelphia. Today, the Grand Chapter meets annually in October.

Omega Tau Sigma was previously affiliated with the Professional Fraternity Association. The Gamma chapter went coed in 1982.

== Symbols ==
The Omega Tau Sigma coat of arms was developed by the Beta chapter in 1924. It features a navy blue shield with insignia, letters, and other elements in gold. The animal kingdom is represented by a lion and ram on the left and right of the shield, respectively. Behind the shield are a crossed sword and spear, representing the tools veterinarians use to defend the animal kingdom. The crest is a helmet with plumes, representing a sign of high royalty.

The fraternity's badge is a diamond-shaped yellow gold pin with a black diamond in the center that bears the Greek letters ΩΤΣ. Its pledge pin is a circular-shaped with a small square inside a larger square on a black background. The fraternity's recognition pin consists of the Greek letters ΩΤΣ.

The colors of Omega Tau Sigma are maroon and navy blue. The fraternity adopted the white carnation as its flower on April 29, 1949; the choice came from the Zeta chapter's annual White Carnation Ball. Its jewel is the pearl. Its publication is called Shroud.

== Chapter houses ==
The Alpha chapter purchased a house at 237 S. 41st Street in Philadelphia in 1947. Alpha purchased a larger chapter house in 1963 at 4013 Pine Street.

Beta chapter purchased a house at 413 Dryden Road in Ithaca in 1912. In 1938, the Alumni Corporation of Beta Chapter of OTS was formed and purchased a new Beta chapter house at 200 Willard Way. The chapter house was remodeled in 1956 and 1994.

In March 1947, Gamma chapter purchased a house at 115 Fourteenth Avenue in Columbus. Gamma purchased a new chapter house at 4673 North Kenny Road in 1974.

Delta chapter acquired a chapter house at 51 Dundas Road in 1955, with the assistance of the OTS Holding Company. In 1966, Delta built a new two-story house at 349 Gordon Street in Guelph, Ontario for $150,000. The 1,500 square feet (140 m^{2}) can house 32 brothers, in addition to providing meeting spaces.

The Zeta Club purchased a house for the Zeta chapter in 1945. In 1958, the club built a new chapter house for $100,000 on West Thach Street. After the Auburn University College of Veterinary Medicine moved, the Zeta Club acquired property to build a new house. In 1993, the Thatch Street chapter house was sold to FarmHouse. The new chapter house was built for $300,000 in 1995.

In 1950, the Eta chapter acquired its house at 1363 S. Milledge Avenue in Athens in 1950. Later, Eta purchased a new chapter house at 1690 S. Lumpkin, followed by a house at 205 Burnett Street in 1985.

Theta chapter has a house on Oregon Street in Urbana. Kappa chapter purchased its chapter house at 158 Hyland in Ames in 1985 that provides accommodations for seventeen members.

== Chapters ==
Following is a list of chapters of Omega Tau Sigma. Active chapters are in bold, inactive chapters in italics.

| Chapter | Charter date and range | Institution | Location | Status | Ref. |
|---|---|---|---|---|---|
| Alpha | 1906–1918, 1928–19xx ? | University of Pennsylvania School of Veterinary Medicine | Philadelphia, Pennsylvania | Inactive | (Note: Chapter went inactive due to the lack of veterinary students during World War I.) |
| **Beta** | March 31, 1911 | New York State College of Veterinary Medicine at Cornell University | Ithaca, New York | Active | |
| **Gamma** | November 25, 1911 | Ohio State University College of Veterinary Medicine | Columbus, Ohio | Active | |
| **Delta** | 1914 | Ontario Veterinary College | Guelph, Ontario | Active | |
| Epsilon | | George Washington University College of Veterinary Medicine | Washington, D.C. | Never chartered | (Note: Epsilon chapter was proposed, and its constitution was drawn up in 1918. However, GWU dropped its Veterinary School before the chapter was chartered.) |
| **Zeta** | March 26, 1940 | Auburn University College of Veterinary Medicine | Auburn, Alabama | Active | |
| **Eta** | October 18, 1948 | University of Georgia College of Veterinary Medicine | Athens, Georgia | Active | |
| **Theta** | April 14, 1956 | University of Illinois College of Veterinary Medicine | Urbana, Illinois | Active | |
| **Iota** | December 20, 1958 | Oklahoma State University College of Veterinary Medicine | Stillwater, Oklahoma | Active | |
| **Kappa** | May 22, 1965 | Iowa State University College of Veterinary Medicine | Ames, Iowa | Active | |
| **Lambda** | Spring 1985 | Virginia–Maryland College of Veterinary Medicine | Blacksburg, Virginia | Active | |
| Mu | 1986–1989 | University of Missouri College of Veterinary Medicine | Columbia, Missouri | Inactive | |
| **Nu** | September 12, 1987 | Texas A&M University School of Veterinary Medicine & Biomedical Sciences | College Station, Texas | Active | |
| **Xi** | February 1990 | Purdue University College of Veterinary Medicine | West Lafayette, Indiana | Active | |
| **Omicron** | January 5, 1991 | Michigan State University College of Veterinary Medicine | East Lansing, Michigan | Active | |
| **Pi** | March 30, 1996 | Tuskegee University School of Veterinary Medicine | Tuskegee, Alabama | Active | |
| **Rho** | October 22, 2016 | Midwestern University College of Veterinary Medicine | Glendale, Arizona | Active | |

== See also ==
- Professional fraternities and sororities

== Notable members ==
- Greg J. Harrison, Kappa, veterinarian noted for having established the first all-bird clinic in the United States
