= Johannes Ø. Sandvik =

Norwegian agronomist and civil servant

Johannes Ølverson Sandvik (27 November 1894 – 1978) was a Norwegian agronomist and civil servant.

After folk high school from 1915 to 1916 and agricultural school from 1916 to 1918, he graduated from the Norwegian College of Agriculture in 1920. He was then hired as the municipal agronomist for Kvinnherad Municipality. From 1924 to 1925 he was a teacher at Hardanger agricultural school.

He was a tenant at Fana rectory from 1925 to 1947, except for a period as municipal agronomist for Bruvik Municipality from 1930 to 1933. He also managed Hardanger agricultural school from 1939 to 1942. From 1949 to his retirement in 1964 he was the head county agronomist of Hordaland.

Sandvik was elected to the municipal council of Fana Municipality in 1946 and served for one year. He returned in 1954, serving as deputy mayor from 1955 to 1959. He also held several board and commission memberships, mostly in the agricultural sector but also of the local savings bank Fana Sparebank.

He was decorated with the King's Medal of Merit in gold. He resided in Ås Municipality after retiring, and died there in 1978. He was the father of Olav Sandvik, rector of the Norwegian School of Veterinary Science.
