= Erzsébet Simonyi =

Hungarian veterinary scientist

- Schwartz, upon entering university in 1933
- Born: Erzsébet Schwartz; 21 July 1915; Budapest, Kingdom of Hungary
- Died: 24 September 1993 (aged 78); Budapest, Hungary
- Other name: Erzsébet Schwartz-Simonyi
- Occupation: veterinarian
- Years active: 1940–1971

Erzsébet Simonyi (21 July 1915 – 24 September 1993) was a veterinarian in Hungary and the first woman to earn a veterinary degree in Hungary (1937). She began a private practice in 1940 and from 1948 to 1952 worked at Phylaxia Vaccine Production Company. In 1952, she was the first woman to head a scientific institution in Hungary, when she was asked to found the Veterinary Vaccine Control Institute for the Department of Agriculture. The purpose of the institute was to develop immunization processes and controls for developing and administering vaccines and Simonyi led it until 1971. In 2012, the Institute became the Directorate of Veterinary Products of the National Food Chain Safety Office.

== Early life ==
Erzsébet Schwartz was born on 21 July 1915 in Budapest in the Kingdom of Hungary to Emánuel Schwartz. Her father operated a veterinary practice in the Angyalföld neighborhood. She completed her secondary studies with honors in 1933, but was not allowed to study medicine. Encouraged by Károly Jármai, a professor of veterinary medicine and at that time vice-rector of the József Nádor University of Technology and Economics, Schwartz enrolled as a temporary student of veterinary science. Her full admission was dependent on an evaluation of her first year performance. She succeeded in her courses and decided not to transfer to medicine, remaining in the veterinary school. She graduated with her degree in 1937, and defended her doctoral thesis, Praecipitatiós kísérletek polysaccharida-antigénnel gastrophilosis esetén (Precipitation Experiments with Polysaccharide Antigen in Cases of Gastrophilosis) in 1939. Her doctoral advisor was Sándor Kotlán, who allowed her to work in his laboratory as an intern.

== Career ==
Because of the war, Schwartz, now known as Simonyi, was unable to secure a research position at the university and opened a private animal practice in 1940. In 1945, she became the secretary of the Free Trade Union of Hungarian Veterinarians, and from 1946 to 1948 served as the organization's general secretary. In 1948, she began working as a researcher at Phylaxia Vaccine Production Company and worked there until 1952. From 1950, Simonyi also was a Lecturer at the Hungarian Academy of Sciences. In 1952, she began working as a researcher for the Ministry of Agriculture producing vaccines for the veterinary department.

Before the year was out, she was asked to found the Állatgyógyászati Oltóanyag-ellenőrző Intéze (Veterinary Vaccine Control Institute). She served as director and lead researcher of the Institute and was the first woman scientist in Hungary to lead a scientific institution. Under her leadership, the Institute focused on developing immunization processes and control procedures for administering and producing vaccines. Simonyi's research interest were primarily with parasitology and virology of animals and she studied bovine viral diarrhea, canine infectious hepatitis, and swine fever. She was one of the first scientists in Hungary to detect pathogenic virus in primary cell cultures. She led the Institute until her retirement in 1971, and then earned her Candidate's Degree with a dissertation summarizing her career in 1972.

== Death and legacy ==
Simonyi died on 24 September 1993 in Budapest. She is remembered as the first woman to earn a veterinary degree, first woman to head a scientific institute, and first woman to obtain a Candidate's Degree in Hungary. The Veterinary Vaccine Control Institute, which she founded became the National Food Chain Safety Office's Directorate of Veterinary Products in 2012 and it continues to authorize and control veterinary vaccines throughout the country.

== Selected works ==
- Simonyi, Erzsébet (1954). "Oltóanyagellenőrzésünk feladatai" [Tasks of Our Vaccine Control]. Magyar állatorvosok lapja (in Hungarian). 9 (7). Budapest: Hirlapkiadó Vállalat: 217–221. ISSN 0025-004X.
- Simonyi, Erzsébet; Regős, Gyula (1955). "Vizsgálatok a kristályibolya-vakcinával oltott sertésekben észlelhető kórbonctani elváltozásokról" [Studies on Post-mortem Lesions in Pigs Vaccinated with Crystal Violet Vaccine]. Magyar állatorvosok lapja (in Hungarian). 10 (6). Budapest: Hirlapkiadó Vállalat: 188–190. ISSN 0025-004X.
- Simonyi, Erzsébet; Regős, Gyula (1956). "Investigation on the Pathological Lesions in Pigs Vaccinated with Crystal Violet Swine Fever Vaccine". Acta Veterinaria. 6 (1). Budapest: Academiae Scientiarum Hungaricae: 49–54. ISSN 0001-7205.
- Simonyi, Erzsébet (1959). "Kutyák fertőző májgyulladása vírusának elszaporítása kutyavese-szövettenyészetben" [Propagation of Infectious Hepatitis Virus in Canine Kidney Tissue Culture]. Magyar állatorvosok lapja (in Hungarian). 14 (3). Budapest: Hirlapkiadó Vállalat: 89–90. ISSN 0025-004X.
- Simonyi, Erzsébet (1960). "Vírusellenes vérsavók értékmérése egyrétegű vesesejt-tenyészetben" [Measurement of Antiviral Serum Values in Monolayer Kidney Cell Culture]. Magyar állatorvosok lapja (in Hungarian). 15 (2). Budapest: Hirlapkiadó Vállalat: 50–51. ISSN 0025-004X.
- Simonyi, Erzsébet; Bognár, Károly; Kucsera, György; Regős, Gyula (1962). "Kristályibolya-vakcinák összehasonlító hatékonysági vizsgálata" [Comparative Efficacy Study of Crystal Violet Vaccines]. Magyar állatorvosok lapja (in Hungarian). 17 (különszám). Budapest: Hirlapkiadó Vállalat: 34–36. ISSN 0025-004X.
- Balla, László; Simonyi, Erzsébet (1962). "Baromfihimlő-vírustörzsek virulenciafokának összehasonlítása" [Comparison of the Degree of Virulence of Chickenpox Virus Strains]. Magyar állatorvosok lapja (in Hungarian). 17 (4). Budapest: Hirlapkiadó Vállalat: 124–130. ISSN 0025-004X.
- Simonyi, Erzsébet (1962). "Primer kutyavese-szövettenyészetből izolált Rubert-féle vírus" [Rubert's Virus Isolated from Primary Canine Kidney Tissue Culture]. Magyar állatorvosok lapja (in Hungarian). 17 (5). Budapest: Hirlapkiadó Vállalat: 161–162. ISSN 0025-004X.
- Simonyi, Erzsébet (1963). "Titration of Antiviral Sera of Monolayer Tissue Cultures of Kidney Cells". Acta Veterinaria. 13 (2). Budapest: Academiae Scientiarum Hungaricae: 103–106. ISSN 0001-7205.
- Simonyi, Erzsébet (1963). "Isolation of Rubarth's Virus from Primary Dog Kidney Tissue Culture Cells". Acta Veterinaria. 13 (2). Budapest: Academiae Scientiarum Hungaricae: 107–110. ISSN 0001-7205.
- Balla, László; Simonyi, Erzsébet (1964). "Comparison of the Virulence of Fowl-Pox Virus Strains by the Intravenous, Cutaneous and Contact Routes of Infection". Acta Veterinaria. 14 (1). Budapest: Academiae Scientiarum Hungaricae: 1–13. ISSN 0001-7205.
- Simonyi, Erzsébet; Bognár, Károly; Kucsera, György; Regős, János (1964). "Comparative Studies on the Potency of Different Crystal-Violet Swine-Fever Vaccine Batches". Acta Veterinaria. 14 (1). Budapest: Academiae Scientiarum Hungaricae: 51–55. ISSN 0001-7205.
- Simonyi, Erzsébet (1965). "Állategészségügyi intézményeink 20 éve. Állatgyógyászati Oltóanyagellenőrző Intézet" [Veterinary Institutions for 20 Years: Veterinary Vaccine Control Institute]. Magyar állatorvosok lapja (in Hungarian). 20 (6). Budapest: Hirlapkiadó Vállalat: 254–255. ISSN 0025-004X.
- Simonyi, Erzsébet (1966). "Állategészségügyi intézményeink 20 éve. Állatgyógyászati Oltóanyagellenőrző Intézet" [Swine Fever Measurement of Serum Value in Tissue Culture]. Magyar állatorvosok lapja (in Hungarian). 21 (8). Budapest: Hirlapkiadó Vállalat: 343–347. ISSN 0025-004X.
- Simonyi, Erzsébet; Biró, Jenő (1967). "Immunization Experiments Against Hog Cholera with the Bovine Viral Diarrhoea Virus Strain Oregon C_{24}V". Acta Veterinaria. 17 (1). Budapest: Academiae Scientiarum Hungaricae: 55–62. ISSN 0001-7205.
- Simonyi, Erzsébet (1967). "Titration of Hog Cholera Antisera in Tissue Culture". Acta Veterinaria. 17 (1). Budapest: Academiae Scientiarum Hungaricae: 63–72. ISSN 0001-7205. PMID 4965784.
- Simonyi, Erzsébet; Bognár, Károly; Biró, Jenő; Palatka, Zoltán (1968). "Immunization Experiments against Bovine Viral Diarrhoea: I. The Production and Application of Hyperimmune Serum". Acta Veterinaria. 18 (3). Budapest: Academiae Scientiarum Hungaricae: 237–243. ISSN 0001-7205. PMID 5683839.
- Simonyi, Erzsébet; Bognár, Károly; Biró, Jenő; Palatka, Zoltán (1968). "Immunization Experiments against Bovine Viral Diarrhoea: II. Active Immunization". Acta Veterinaria. 18 (3). Budapest: Academiae Scientiarum Hungaricae: 245–250. ISSN 0001-7205. PMID 5683840.
- Simonyi, Erzsébet (1971). "Élővírus-vakcinák termelése és ellenőrzése. A védévac előállítása diploid sejtvonalon" [Production and Control of Live Virus Vaccines" Production of Protective Vaccine on a Diploid Cell Line]. Magyar állatorvosok lapja (in Hungarian). 26 (7). Budapest: Hirlapkiadó Vállalat: 376–380. ISSN 0025-004X.
- Simonyi, Erzsébet (1972). Egyes oltóanyagok termelésének és ellenőrzésének korszerűsítése. Tudományos tevékenység tézisszerű összefoglalása [Modernization of the Production and Control of Certain Vaccines: Thesis Summary of Scientific Activity] (Candidacy) (in Hungarian). Budapest.
