= Reidar Birkeland =

Norwegian veterinarian (1928–2018)

Gustav Reidar Birkeland (19 November 1928 – 19 September 2018) was a Norwegian veterinarian.

== Life and career ==
Gustav Reidar Birkeland was born in Sauda Municipality, and took the dr.med.vet. degree in 1955. He was a lecturer in surgery at the Norwegian School of Veterinary Science from 1959 to 1984, and then professor from 1985 to 1994. He also served as dean there from 1983 to 1988. He holds an honorary degree from Helsinki, bestowed 1995. Birkeland died on 19 September 2018, at the age of 89.

Academic offices
Preceded by Weiert Velle	dean of the Norwegian School of Veterinary Science; 1983–1988	Succeeded by Kåre Fossum
