= Sandvik (disambiguation) =

Sandvik is a Swedish company.

Sandvik may also refer to:

- Sandvik (surname)
- Sandvík, a village in the Faroe Islands
- Sandvik Church, a church in Norway

== See also ==
- Sandvika (disambiguation)
