= Henrik Edland =

Norwegian veterinarian

Henrik Edland (24 April 1905 – 5 June 1984) was a Norwegian veterinarian known for his work on improving the production of beef and on the conservation of puffins.

He was born in Gjesdal Municipality. He was professor of anatomy at the Norwegian School of Veterinary Science from 1936 to 1973, and served as rector there from 1951 to 1957. He died in Nittedal Municipality.

Academic offices
Preceded by Anton Johnson Brandt	Rector of the Norwegian School of Veterinary Science; 1951–1957	Succeeded by Hans Fredrik Wirstad
