= Paraveterinary workers in Thailand =

Type of profession in Thailand

Veterinary technologists in Thailand are represented by the Veterinary Technology Association of Thailand (VTAT). Veterinary technology was established in Thailand in 1993 at Kasetsart University (KU) in Bangkok which offers a Bachelor of Science degree in veterinary technology. In 2011, a veterinary nursing program is to be established, after which veterinary technology will have a greater emphasis on laboratory diagnostics while veterinary nursing will concentrate more on clinical care. At present, veterinary technology fills both of these roles.
