= Paraveterinary workers in Italy =

In Italy, veterinary support personnel do not hold any official state recognition. People with several years of experience and training in animal clinics can present themselves as "veterinary technicians". There are not accredited programs by l'Associazione Nazionale Medici Veterinari Italiani (ANMVI-the Italian veterinary medical association) and there is not a national exam. Although no formal education is required, since 2001 there are various programs of study:

- A two-year private (diploma awarding) course developed by ABIVET srl accredited from ACOVENE (Accreditation Committee for Veterinary Nurse Education) in 2007. This school also provides distance learning.
- Three year (degree awarding) courses provided from faculties of veterinary medicine at various universities.

At this date there is not an official national association representing the interest of veterinary technicians but two private organizations provide courses, congresses, and continuing education:

- ATAV Veterinary auxiliary technicians association (Associazione tecnici ausiliari veterinari)
- TECNIVET Veterinary technicians association

(Melania Spica, VT, Tecnivet secretary, 1 Sep 2011).
