= Ceva Santé Animale =

Multinational animal-health company

- Industry: Veterinary medicine
- Predecessors: Sanofi; Synthélabo
- Founded: 1999; 27 years ago
- Headquarters: Libourne, France
- Key people: Marc Prikazsky (CEO & Chairman)
- Number of employees: 5,700
- Website: ceva.com/en

Ceva Santé Animale (Ceva) is a multinational animal health company based in Libourne, France. Established in 1999, Ceva undertakes research, development, production and marketing of pharmaceutical products and vaccines, and also provides complementary services and equipment, for companion animals, poultry, ruminants and swine.

Ceva also supplies; hatchery vaccines, vaccination services and equipment; pheromone-based behavioural products for cats and dogs with additional knowledge in companion animal cardiology, locomotion and dermatology; products for the management of reproduction in ruminants such as antibiotic therapies and vaccines; and a growing range of products for swine, including antibiotic therapies, reproduction management and vaccines.

With revenues of US$1.16 billion (€1.1 billion) for 2017, Ceva is the 6th largest animal health company in the world and the biggest French multinational in the sector based on revenue.

Ceva is based in 45 countries and works in more than 110 countries worldwide. It has 12 research and development centres, 25 production sites and more than 5,500 employees.

In 2010, to mark its 10th anniversary, the company adopted a new mission statement, 'Together, we are building a new reference to create value beyond animal health', abbreviated in the slogan to 'Together, beyond animal health'.

The chairman and CEO is Marc Prikazsky.

== History ==
In 1999, two French pharmaceutical companies, Sanofi and Synthélabo, merged to form Sanofi-Synthélabo. Soon after the merger, the new company divested several businesses, including its animal health and nutrition business, Sanofi Santé Nutrition Animale.

This business was acquired through the first of four leveraged management buyouts (LMBO) and resulted in the establishment in 1999 of Ceva Santé Animal. CEVA was acquired by IK Partners from PAI Partners in September 2003. It was then sold in June 2007 to its management, associated with a consortium of investors grouping Euromezzanine, Natexis Industrie and Natixis Investissement.

In 2014, there was a Reshaping of Ceva's capital structure to accompany the launch of the company's ambition to become the first independent player within the top 5 global animal health companies by 2020. While management still retained the position of majority shareholders long-term strategic partners were selected to support the group's future growth ambitions:Temasek, CDH Investments, Euromezzanine, Sagard and Mérieux Développement.

Since 1999, Ceva has been the sole shareholder of Ceva-Phylaxia. Founded in Hungary in 1912, the Phylaxia Vaccine Production Co produced the first vaccine against classical swine fever. Scientists including József Marek and Aladár Aujeszky were closely associated with the company.

Ceva has grown rapidly through both acquisitions and organic growth. In 2000 it ranked 18th globally with sales of US$140 million a year.

Major acquisitions by Ceva include:

- 2017: Purchase of ex-Merial product range
- 2017: Joint-venture agreement between EBVAC, China and Ceva to create a new business, Ceva Ebvac, focused on the swine vaccine sector
- 2016: Hertape Saude Animale Ltda. and Inova Biotecnologia Saude Animale Ltda, Brazil,
- 2016: Biovac, a manufacturer of autogeneous (bacterial) vaccines, allergy treatments and reagents based in Angers, France
- 2015: Polchem, India
- 2013: Sogeval
- 2011: Vetech Laboratories, Inc., a Canadian poultry vaccine manufacturer that produces live coccidiosis vaccines for poultry under the trade name Immucox®
- 2011: First joint venture established in China, Ceva Huadu
- 2010: Summit VetPharm, a New Jersey–based company
- 2005: Biomune, a US poultry vaccine producer based in Lenexa.

== Awards and recognition ==
In 2016, Ceva won the best company in Europe category in Animal Pharm's annual industry awards.

In 2016, Ceva's hatchery vaccination services program for poultry, the C.H.I.C.K Program, received quality recognition from the international testing and certification company, Bureau Veritas Group, based in Paris. This was the first time a services program delivered by an animal health company had received internationally recognised quality approval.

Since 2005, Ceva has been awarded six International Cat Care (ICC) Easy to Give Awards. It has also received three ICC Cat Friendly Awards for products in the Feliway range. The Cat Friendly Awards recognise products which have made a real difference to cat wellbeing and welfare.

== Key partnerships ==
Ceva established a partnership with the l'Association Chiens Guides d'Aveugles Aliénor (guide dogs for the blind association).

2018

Ceva is associated with the Union Bordeaux Bègles, a French rugby union team. The team's new performance centre, inaugurated in October at the Moga stadium in Bègles, has been named the Ceva Campus.

Wageningen Bioveterinary Research (WBVR) and Ceva are developing veterinary vaccines for the control of (re)emerging infectious animal diseases, such as Rift Valley fever and Influenza.

The North Carolina State College of Veterinary Medicine and Ceva are collaborating on a distance learning project providing certification in poultry health management for veterinarians in Latin America.

2017

The World Veterinary Association (WVA) created the Global Animal Welfare Awards, co-founded and supported by Ceva, to recognize and reward veterinarians who contribute to the protection and welfare of animals.

The World Veterinary Poultry Association (WVPA) and Ceva launched a digital library resource on poultry veterinary medicine.

2015

Ceva is involved in a program to supply Australia's wildlife veterinarians with an antibiotic to treat chlamydia disease in koala's free of charge.

Ceva partnered with WikiVet to develop a comprehensive on-line peer-reviewed veterinary knowledge database and add a module on feline behaviour.

Ceva received a grant from the Bill & Melinda Gates Foundation to improve the lives of smallholder and poor village farmers by improving the health and productive capacity of poultry and cattle, species with significant economic importance to poor livestock keepers in developing countries.

Ceva sponsored the UK Animal Welfare Awards, in partnership with the Veterinary Times and the VN Times.

2012

Since 2012, the Fondation du Patrimoine and Ceva, under the patronage of the French Ministry of Agriculture, have awarded the Fondation du Patrimoine National Animal Agro-Biodiversity Prize in recognition of initiatives to preserve and promote French rare breeds.

Ceva has supported TOLFA (Tree of Life for Animals), an animal welfare charity registered in the UK and India with its operational base in Rajasthan, Northern India. Rachel Wright, TOLFA's founder, was recognised as the Welfare Nurse of the Year in the inaugural Ceva Awards for Animal Welfare.

== Business with blood farms ==
Ceva has funded several studies about the equine chorionic gonadotropin (eCG) effects on livestock productivity, including one at École nationale vétérinaire d'Alfort, 2001. According to an investigation published in French journal Libération, CEVA bought the eCG in Syntex bloodfarms, accused of cruelty to animals by NGOs Eyes on Animals (Netherlands), Tierschutzbund Zurich (TSB – Switzerland ), Animal Welfare Foundation (AWF – Germany) and Welfarm (France), among others.

Pierre Revel-Mouroz, Deputy Chief Executive Officer in charge of the audit at Ceva Santé Animale, alerted in 2015, justified this choice by "the absence of detection of anomalies in the farm where the laboratory gets supplies". According to Libération, Ceva continued to supply from Syntex mid-July 2018, despite repeated warnings: the article denounces this "inertia". On July 25, 2018, Ceva announced an investigation to verify the quality of life of the concerned mares. On August 3, 2018, the laboratory indicates (on its website) to renounce to provide in South America. On 16 December 2018, the collectif Boucherie Abolition published an article accusing the multinational CEVA of "zoocide".

The concerned products are marketed as "Fertipig" for pigs, and "Syncro Part" or "Syncrostim" for cattle.
