= Paraveterinary workers in South Africa =

Veterinary nurses (VNs) in South Africa attend a two-year program at the Onderstepoort campus of the University of Pretoria culminating in a diploma in veterinary nursing [DipVetNurs or DVN (previously Diploma Curing Animals or Dip.Cur.Anim.)] and unlike lay staff are trained to do everything except clinical consultations and surgery subject to the Para-Veterinary Profession's Act. Qualified veterinary nurses, of both genders, utilize the title of "Sister (Sr.)", similar to the practice of female charge nurses in the human medical field in many countries, representing their professional sisterhood (Sr. Tania Serfontein, vice-president, VNASA, February 2009). They can be recognised by the wearing of epaulettes bearing a lamb, representing the patients they care for; a lamp, representing knowledge; and an axe, symbolising strength. They are represented by the Veterinary Nurses Association of South Africa (VNASA) which was started in 1978 after South Africa's first class of qualified veterinary nurses graduated. Permission to offer a Bachelor of Veterinary Nursing through the University of Pretoria was recently applied for to the South African Qualifications Authority; under consideration is the addition of one year of study to the current DipVetNurs program, converting the diploma to a degree. Other veterinary para-professionals found in South Africa include animal health technicians (who oversee the well-being of food animals), laboratory animal technologists (who oversee the well-being of research animals), and veterinary technologists (who work mainly in diagnostic laboratories).
