= Fish medicine =

Study and treatment of the diseases of fish

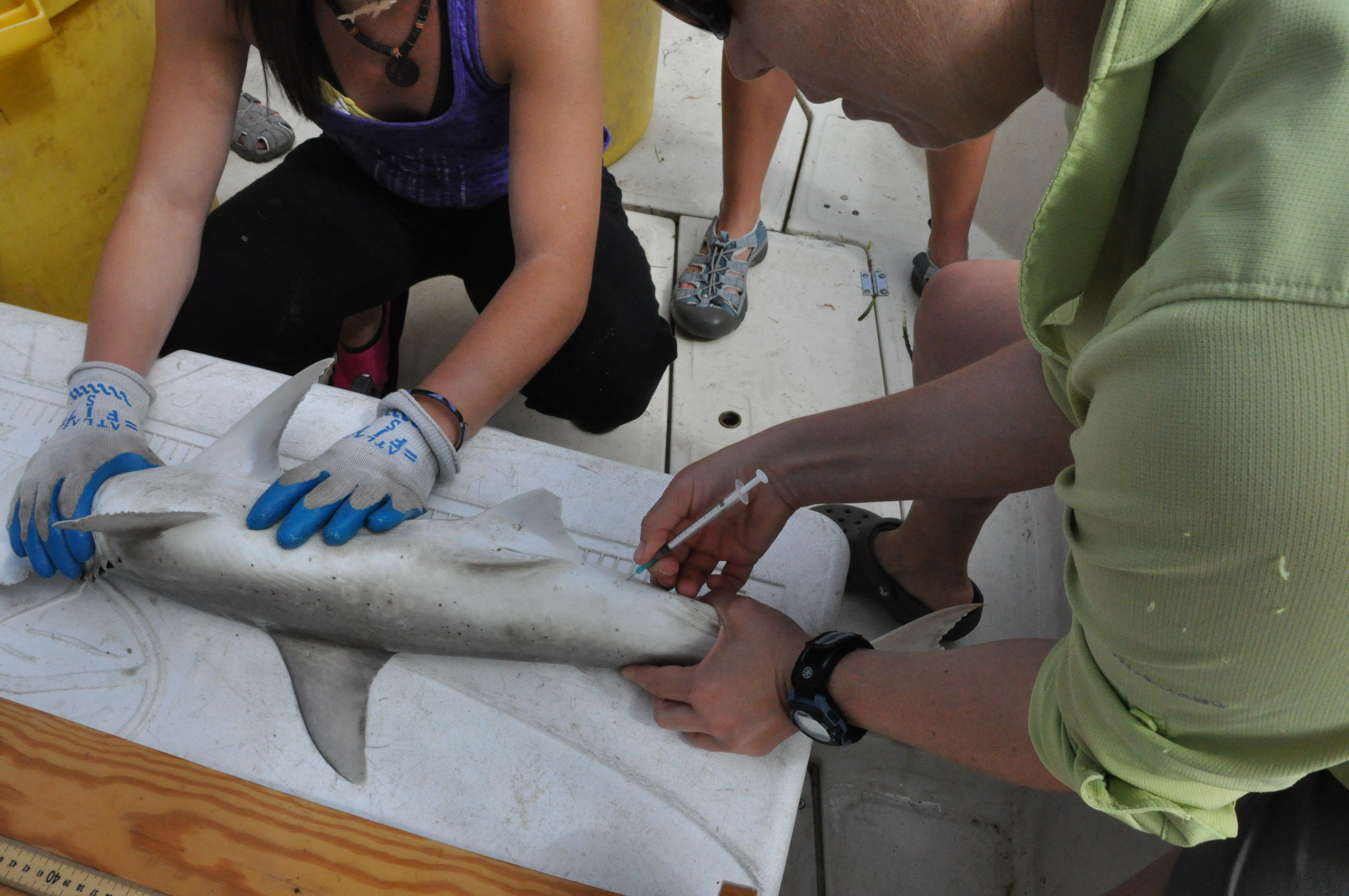
A blood sample being taken from a bonnethead shark pup.

Fish medicine is the study and treatment of the diseases of fish. Although some practitioners work primarily with aquarium fish, this field also has important applications to fisheries management.

Fish medicine is a relatively recent veterinary specialization; veterinary textbooks in the English language were not published until the early 1990s. The United States does not have an official specialization for fish medicine, worldwide there are several professional organizations for veterinarians interested in fish medicine, such as the World Aquatic Veterinary Medical Association, and the International Association of Aquatic Animal Medicine.
