= Harry Spira =

Harold Roger "Harry" Spira (21 June 1923 – 17 October 1991) was an Australian veterinarian, geneticist and dog fancier who was instrumental in the development of dog breeding programs which used artificial insemination and frozen semen. Born in Vienna, Austria, he became an author and respected dog-show judge, he was active in the Australian National Kennel Club and proposed an alternative system of dog breed grouping.

== Career ==
Among his myriad activities, Spira participated in the promotion of the Basset Hound in Australia and was an outspoken opponent of breed-specific legislation against the German Shepherd dog. His book Canine Terminology, which has come to be considered a standard text on the subject, was reprinted in 2006.

Spira was the first Australian appointed to judge the coveted Best In Show award at Crufts Dog Show in England.

The H R Spira Perpetual Trophy is awarded each year to the dog judged as the Best in Show at the Sydney Royal Dog Show.
