= Nelson Çabej =

Albanian biologist and author (born 1939)

Nelson R. Çabej
- Born: November 17, 1939 (age 86); Gjirokastër, Albania
- Occupations: Veterinarian, Immunologist, Author, Editor, Biologist
- Years active: 1961-1995
- Known for: Work in biology and various other branches of science
- Notable work: "The Epigenetic Principles of Evolution"; "Building the most Complex Structure on Earth"

Nelson R. Çabej (born November 17, 1939, in Gjirokastër, Albania) is a biologist and author.

== Education ==
He obtained his B.A. in veterinary science in 1961, followed by B.A. in chemistry in 1976, and finally completed his doctorate degree (PhD) in biology in 1986.

== Career ==
He worked as a veterinarian (1961–66 and 1975–1980), as immunologist (1970–1975), book editor (1980–1990) and biology lecturer (1985–1995). He lives in New Jersey with his family.

His multifaceted scientific research includes widely different research areas, extending from applied biology (epizootology), experimental molecular biology and immunology, genetics, evolution theory, development and epigenetics to the history, history of science, linguistics, philosophy, journalism, and translation.

Over the years, Çabej has penned over 100 articles and published 20 books in Albanian and English. Primarily, investigative contributions are in the evolutionary biology with emphasis in the role of epigenetics through the nervous system in the evolution of the animal. The theory, which is positively valued in peer reviewed journals, is presented in four publications, “The Epigenetic Principles of Evolution” (2012) and “Building the most Complex Structure on Earth” (2013).

== Selected articles ==
- Cabej, Nelson R. (January 2011). "Neural control of gene recruitment in metazoans". Developmental Dynamics. 240 (1): 1–8. doi:10.1002/dvdy.22505. PMID 21117148.
- Cabej, Nelson R. (May 2023). "On the origin and nature of nongenetic information in eumetazoans". Annals of the New York Academy of Sciences. 1525 (1): 104–127. Bibcode:2023NYASA1525..104C. doi:10.1111/nyas.15001. PMID 37154677.
- Cabej, Nelson R. (July 2021). "A mechanism of inheritance of acquired traits in animals". Developmental Biology. 475: 106–117. doi:10.1016/j.ydbio.2021.03.004. PMID 33741349.
- Cabej, Nelson R. (2020). "A neural mechanism of nuclear receptor expression and regionalization". Developmental Dynamics. 249 (10): 1172–1181. doi:10.1002/dvdy.195. PMID 32406963. S2CID 218634674.
- "Rreth pikëpamjeve që kundërshtojnë autoktoninë e shqiptarëve". Studime Historike (in Albanian). 3: 125–147. 1987.

== Selected books ==
- Gjenetika [Genetics]. Tirana. 1979. (coauthored with B. Shehu)
- Nga historia e zhvillimit të shkencës shqiptare [From the history of the development of Albanian science] (in Albanian). 8 Nëntori. 1980.
- Mbi Natyrën e Jetës [On the Nature of Life]. Tirana. 1984.
- Njohja Shkencore dhe Biologjia e Sotme [Scientific Knowledge and the Modern Biology]. Tirana. 1987.
- Probleme Filozofike të Biologjisë [Philosophical Problems of Biology]. Tirana. 1988.
- Neural control of development: The epigenelic theory of heredity. Dumont, N.J.: Albanet. 2004. ISBN 9780971074668.
- Epigenetic principles of evolution. London: Elsevier. 2012. ISBN 9780124158313.
- Building the Most Complex Structure on Earth An Epigenetic Narrative of Development and Evolution of Animals. Burlington: Elsevier Science. 2013. ISBN 9780124017290.
- Ilirët që mbijetuan : (Përgjigje simpoziumit "Ilirët dhe Shqiptarët" të Akademisë Serbe të Shkencave dhe Arteve) (in Albanian). Fan Noli. 2013. ISBN 9789928165343.
- Vazhdimësi iliro-shqiptare në emrat e vendeve (in Albanian). Tirana: Fan Noli. 2014. ISBN 9789928165688.
- Në gjurmët e perëndive dhe mitologjemave ilire [In the footsteps of Illyrian gods and mythologies] (in Albanian). Tirana: Fan Noli. 2014. ISBN 9789928165671.
- Epirotes: Albanians of Antiquity. New Jersey: Albanet Publishing. 2016. ISBN 9781944788896.
- Prejardhja dhe Formimi i Popullit Shqiptar I [Origin and Formation of the Albanian People] (in Albanian). Tirana: Fan Noli. 2017. ISBN 9789928203953.
- Epigenetic Principles of Evolution (2nd ed.). London-San Diego-Cambridge, MA: Academic Press. 2019. ISBN 9780128140673.
- Epigenetic Mechanisms of the Cambrian Explosion. London-San Diego-Cambridge, MA: Academic Press. 2020. ISBN 9780128143117.
- Nongenetic Information and Evolution. London-San Diego-Cambridge, MA: Academic Press. 2025. ISBN 9780443221590.

== Selected science translations ==
- Darwin, C. (1859) The Origin of Species. Translated from the English original (1859) publication into Albanian.
- Mendel, G. (1865). Versuche über Pflanzenhybriden. Translated from the German original, with an introduction for the Albanian readership
- Autochthonie der Albaner in der deurschen Forschung. A compilation of selected pieces from 12 German historians and linguists of the last three centuries about the autochthony and the Illyrian origins of Albanians. Translated from German. With an introduction for the Albanian readership.
