= Spay/neuter project =

Spay/neuter project is a national organization in the United States spreading information about the importance of spaying/neutering pets and working to make the procedure affordable for all pet owners.
