= Paraveterinary workers in Australia =

Type of profession in Australia

The role of a veterinary nurse in Australia is to assist veterinary surgeons in their duties and to provide nursing care to animal patients. Day-to-day responsibilities may include animal restraint during procedures and examinations, monitoring and maintaining anaesthesia, assisting in surgical and medical procedures, performing clinical pathology tasks, administering medications, wound management and bandaging, dental prophylaxis, providing nutritional advice, and communicating with clients regarding patient care. The scope of a veterinary nurse's duties may vary depending on the size of the practice, the nurse's level of qualification, and the supervising veterinarian.

The title of veterinary nurse is not a protected title in Australia. Although less common now, veterinary practices can hire nurses without any qualifications. Around half of veterinary nurses in Australia are qualified, or are working towards their qualification. There are certifications available that provide training and qualifications to veterinary nurses, such as a Certificate IV in Veterinary Nursing, Bachelor of Veterinary Technology or Bachelor of Veterinary Nursing. Certified nurses can undertake further study through the Diploma of Veterinary Nursing (Surgical, ECC or General Practice).

Veterinary nurses exhibiting excellence in their field and completing continual professional development may be recognised jointly by the Veterinary Nurses Council of Australia (VNCA) and the Australian Veterinary Association (AVA) with the post-nominal letters AVN (Accredited Veterinary Nurse).

== Registration ==
With the exception of Western Australia, veterinary nurses in Australia do not have to be registered with a board in order to practise. Through the Veterinary Nurses Council of Australia (VNCA), there is an optional registration via the Australian Veterinary Nurse and Technician (AVNAT) scheme, launched on April 1, 2019.

Veterinary nurses can become a Registered Veterinary Nurse (RVN) with the VNCA, through completion of one of the following:

- Certificate IV in Veterinary Nursing (Australia)
- Diploma in Veterinary Nursing Level 3 (United Kingdom)
- Diploma in Veterinary Nursing (New Zealand)
- CVMA-accredited college qualifications (Canada)

Alternatively, technicians can become a Registered Veterinary Technician (RVT) with the VNCA, through completion of one of the following:

- Bachelor of Veterinary Technology (University of Queensland)
- Bachelor of Veterinary Technology (Charles Sturt University)
- Veterinary technician degree and completion of VNTE examinations (USA)

=== Western Australia ===
In Western Australia, all practising veterinary nurses must be registered with the Veterinary Practice Board of Western Australia under the Veterinary Practice Act 2021.

The Veterinary Practice Regulations 2022, as amended by the Veterinary Practice Amendment Regulations 2025, regulate what acts a veterinary nurse can legally perform and define three levels of supervision: personal, direct and general. The 2025 amendments introduced two categories of veterinary nurse — general veterinary nurse and advanced veterinary nurse — with the advanced category recognising nurses with higher-level clinical skills and a broader scope of practice.
