= Morné de la Rey =

South African veterinarian

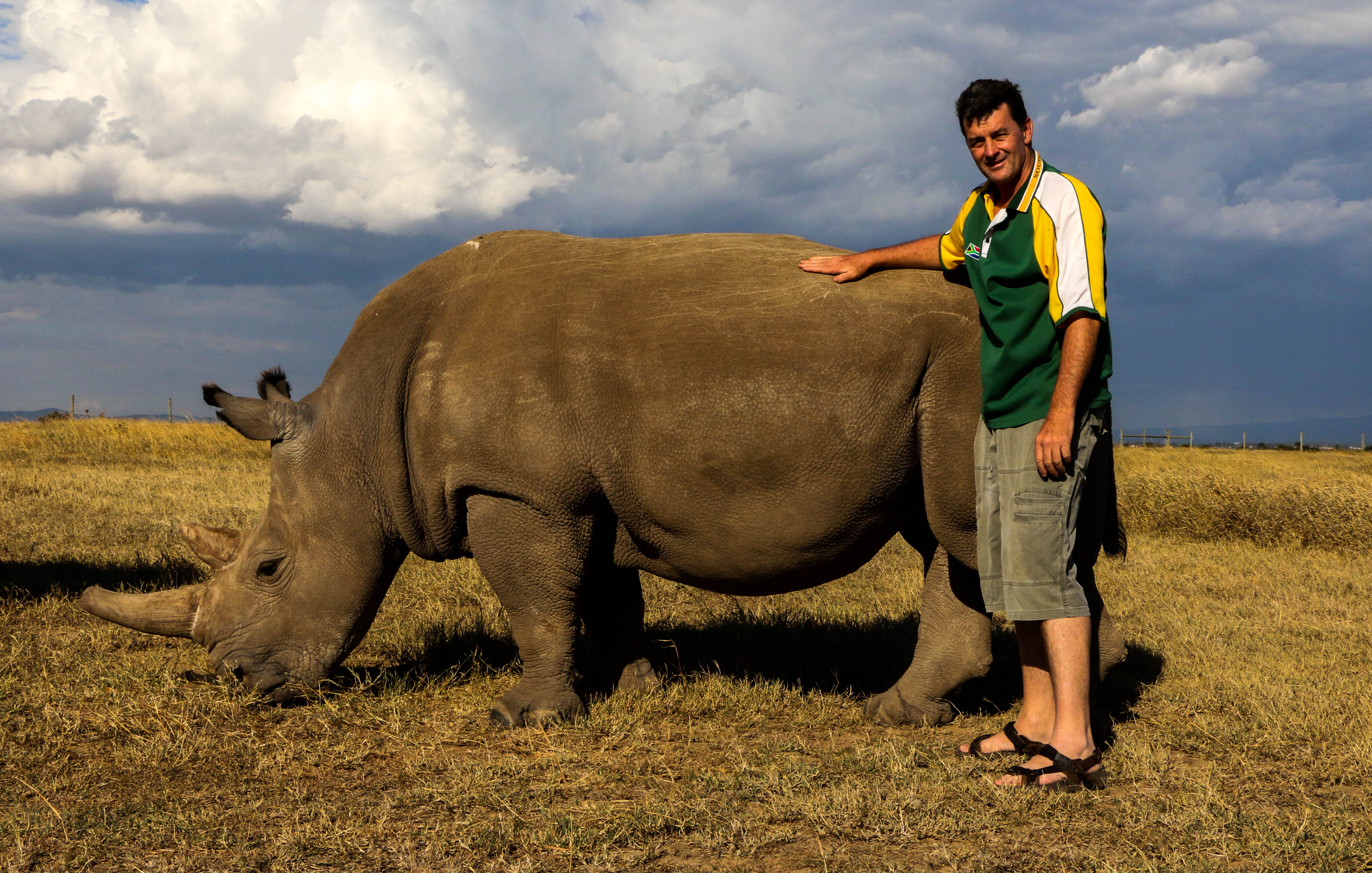
Dr. Morné de la Rey with one of the White Rhino on Ol Pejeta a wildlife conservancy in Kenya.

Morné de la Rey (born 7 February 1970) is a South African veterinary surgeon and embryo transfer specialist. In 2003, he was one of a team of scientists and veterinarians from his company Embryo Plus and the Danish Agriculture Institute to clone a cow, the first animal to be cloned in Africa. In 2016, he was one of a team to use in vitro fertilisation successfully for the first time in the Cape buffalo.

== Education and career ==
De la Rey was born in Brits, South Africa he got his love for animals from his father Dr. Ronald de la Rey, whom was also a veterinarian. He studied at the University of Pretoria, on Onderstepoort at the Faculty of Veterinary Science, where he received his BVSc in 1994. In 1998 he became the CEO of Embryo Plus an embryo transfer and AI centre in South Africa.

He became a member of the International Embryo Transfer Society(IETS) and did the first Embryo Sexing in Africa in 1994.

In 1995 he became the first person in Africa to do Embryo splitting in Sheep and Goat, following that success, he produced the first Arabian horse embryo foal in Africa, in 1998.

During the 2000s he was elected by the IETS to be the representative for Africa on Data Retrieval, and in 2002 founded the Companion Animal, Non-domestic and Endangered Species committee (CANDES).

In 2003, he was involved as one of the scientists and veterinarians from Embryo Plus and the Danish Agriculture Institute to clone the first calf in Africa, named Futhi.

== Wildlife career ==
In 2010 he produced Sable Antelope calves by means of Fixed Time Artificial Insemination with frozen thawed semen.

He became the first person in the world to produce Sable Antelope calves by means of embryo transfers in 2011. Following his success he produced the first cross type between Zambian Sable Antelope embryo calves born out of southern Sable Antelope.

He had great success with the Cape Buffalo as well, in 2013 produced the first pregnancies in the Cape Buffalo by means of embryo transfers in the world. In 2016 he became successful with IVF in Cape Buffalo and produced the first calf in the world.

=== Timeline ===
1994: Became member of the International Embryo Transfer Society(IETS)

1994: Firstpersonto do Embryo Sexing in Africa.

1994: Approved by South African Veterinary Semen and Embryo Group as accredited team leader for export of Bovine Embryos.

1995: Approved by Canadian Food Inspection Services as accreditedteam leader for export of Bovine Embryos.

1995: First person to do embryo splitting in Sheep and Goat embryos in Africa.

1998: Produced the first Arabian horse embryo foal in Africa

1998- date: Elected on the executive committee of South African Veterinary Semen and Embryo Group, various positions.

2000- date: Elected as representativefor Africa on the Data Retrieval committee of the IETS.

2002- date: Founding member of the Companion Animal, Non-domestic and Endangered Species committee(CANDES) of the IETS.

2003- date: Elected as a representative for Africa on the Health and Safety Advisory committee(HASAC) of the IETS.

2003: Was involved with the birth of the first everCloned calf in Africa, named Futhi.

2005- date :Requested to act as patron and advisor to the East African Embryo Transfer Association.

2010: Produced Sable Antelope calves by means of Fixed Time Artificial Insemination with frozen thawedsemen.

2011: Produced the first Sable Antelope calves born by means of embryo transfers in the world.

2012: Was asked to act as Specialist Agricultural advisor for MIGHT (Malaysia)

2013: Produced the first pregnancies in African Buffalo by means of embryo transfers in the world.

2015: Produced the first cross typeZambian Sable Antelope embryo calves born out of southern Sable Antelope surrogates

2016: Produced the first IVF African Buffalo calf in the world.

2017: Aspirated first oocytes from Whiterhino in Africa. Culture of 2 cell and 4 cell embryos from rhino oocytes.

2018: Was selected to harvest and bank/freeze the genetics of the last northern white rhino bull (Sudan) in the world when he was given euthanasia.

2018: Aspirated through trans-rectal OPU up to 5 oocytes in life sedated rhino cows.

2018: Produced the first white rhino morula embryos with free swimming sperm and IVF after aspirating oocytes with a trans-rectal aspiration procedure.

2018: Nominated and approved as Conservation Fellow of the San Diego Zoo Global.

2018: Appointed as extra-ordinaryprofessor at Onderstepoort, Faculty of Veterinary Science.

== Publications ==
1. Blevins, B.A., de la Rey, M. and Loskutoff, N.M. (2008) Effect of density gradient centrifugation with trypsin on the fertilizing capability of bovine sperm. Reproduction, Fertility and Development 20(1):84.
2. De la Rey, M., Morfeld, K.A., Treadwell, R. and Loskutoff, N.M. (2005) The effect of a novel semen disinfection treatment on the viability and fertilizing capacity in vivo of bovine spermatozoa. Reproduction, Fertility and Development 17 (1,2): 184.
3. Morfeld, K., Henton, M.M., Grobler, D., Bengis, R., Puffer, A., Armstrong, D.L., Dankoff, S., de la Rey, M., de la Rey, R., Hansen, H., Strick, J., Rasmussen, L., York, D., Zimmermann, D., de Klerk, L.M., van Dyk, D.S., Crichton, E.G., Popescu, A., Stringfellow, D. and Loskutoff, N.M. (2001). Elimination of Brucella abortus from infected domestic (Bos taurus) and wild (Bos gaurus) cattle and buffalo (Syncerus caffer) semen without compromising sperm viability. Theriogenology 55:393..
4. Puffer, A., de la Rey, R., de la Rey, M., Hansen, H., Grobler, D., Hofmeyr, M., Malan, J.H., Armstrong, D.L., Dankoff, S., Rasmussen, L., York, D., Zimmermann, D. and Loskutoff, N.M. (2001) Choice of chemicals used in immobilization protocols can significantly affect semen quality in ejaculates collected from free-ranging African buffalo (Syncerus caffer). Theriogenology 55:398.
