= Paraveterinary workers in Sweden =

Veterinary nurses (as well as veterinary radiographers, administrative personnel, and laboratory assistants) have been represented in Sweden since 1997 by Riksföreningen Anställda Inom Djursjukvården (RAID—The Swedish National Association of Veterinary Employees). Education consists of a two-year 80 credit post-secondary program at the Swedish University of Agricultural Sciences (SLU). RAID has also devised a distance learning course for experienced nurses and organizes continuing education for para-professionals in the equine and small-animal sectors.
