= Robert Zammit =

Robert Zammit is an Australian veterinarian and television personality.

== Career ==
He practices in Sydney and was a featured veterinarian on the long-running TV show Burke's Backyard. He currently hosts a weekly radio show on 2GB. Zammit initially worked as a consultant veterinary surgeon on A Country Practice then began on-screen work with Channel Seven on Terry Willese Tonight. He later appeared as veterinarian on the Today Show then worked with Kerri-Anne Kennerley on the Midday Show. While still maintaining a veterinary practice on the outskirts of Sydney, his interest in zoo work has seen his family rear some unusual pets including lion cubs, tigers and a puma.

Zammit is an ambassador for the Animal Welfare League of NSW, as well as the director of Zambi Wildlife Retreat alongside Traci Griffiths and Donna Wilson.
