= Paraveterinary workers in France =

Type of profession in France

Veterinary support personnel in France are organized according to La Convention Collective Nationale des Cabinets et Cliniques Vétérinaires, a state sponsored trade union organized by French veterinarians, and consist of five pay echelons. Echelon 1 consists of housekeeping and maintenance personnel, echelon 2 consists of reception and secretarial personnel, while echelons 3-5 are Auxiliaires Vétérinaires directly responsible for animal care. Those working at echelons 4 and 5 have undergone formal apprenticeships, administered by le Groupement d'Intérét Public Formation Santé Animale et Auxiliaire vétérinaire (GIPSA), of one and two years respectively and are titled Auxiliaires Vétérinaires Quatre (AVQ or AV4) and Auxiliaire Spécialisé Vétérinaire (ASV). The former's job description is similar to that of the approved veterinary assistant in North America while the latter's job description is similar to veterinary technicians in North America. The title of Technicien en Santé Animale (TSA) is also used in France but is awarded after a college level course of study in animal health and is not a replacement for the officially recognized titles of AVQ and ASV. Those in possession of a combination of the titles TSA and ASV are the equivalents of veterinary technologists in North America and can often be found working in production animal medicine, pharmacological research, or at veterinary school teaching hospitals. At present there is not an official national association representing the interests of veterinary auxiliaries.
