= Sandvika Tunnel =

Road tunnel in Norway

Coordinates: 59°53′33″N 010°31′42″E

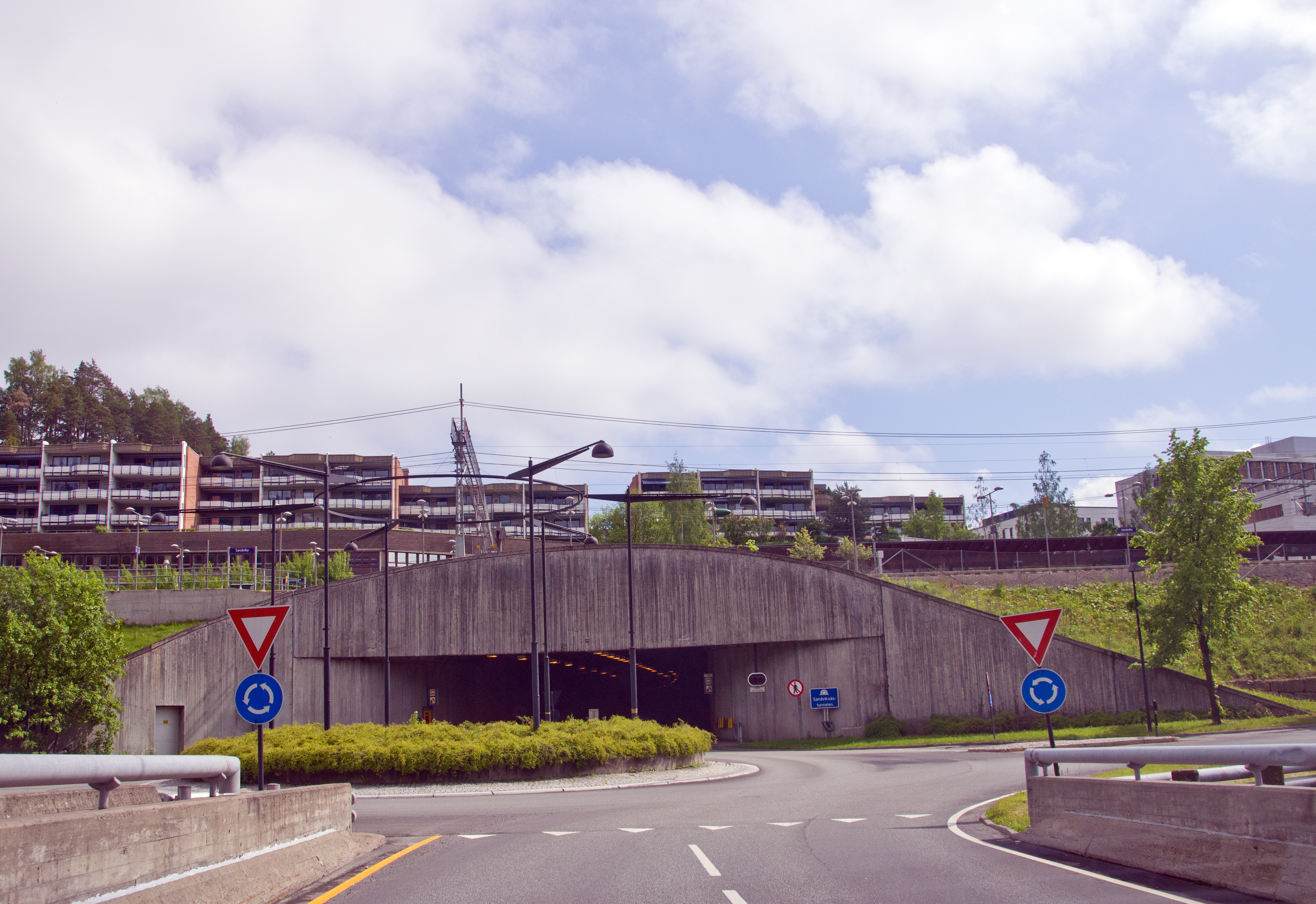
Sandvika Tunnel

The Sandviksås Tunnel (Norwegian: Sandviksåstunnelen) is the name of a road tunnel that runs through the hill Sandviksåsen east of Sandvika in Norway. It forms a part of the Norwegian National Road 164, and near its northern entrance lies Sandvika Station. It was opened in 1991.
