= Greg J. Harrison =

American veterinarian

Greg J. Harrison is an American avian (bird) veterinarian who is noted for having established the US' first all-bird clinic, The Bird Hospital in Lake Worth, Florida. He later was a founder of the company HBD International, Inc. which manufactures the product line Harrison's Bird Foods. Harrison also was a main contributor and editor of several of the field's earliest and most well-known texts including, Avian Medicine: Principles and Applications and Clinical Avian Medicine. and the Avian Veterinary Compendium.

== Early life and education ==
Harrison graduated a veterinarian Iowa State University in 1967. He was a charter member of the Omega Tau Sigma fraternity.

== Career ==
Harrison moved to South Florida shortly after graduation. Initially he operated a typical all-animal veterinary clinic but later changed the clinic to avian-only. Harrison spent several years developing nutrition formulas for captive birds, and marketing a line of products under the brand "Harrison's Bird Diets". His wife Linda Harrison, an editor, established the veterinary periodical Exotic DVM (A Practical Resource For Clinicians) and both would serve as early leaders of the AAV (Association of Avian Veterinarians).

Harrison also studied the use of rigid endoscopy in the treatment of birds.

Harrison for many years spoke and wrote about bird health, and was frequently quoted in the media and in other publications as an expert on this subject.
