= Paraveterinary workers in Denmark =

Veterinary nurses in Denmark, (known as veterinærsygeplejerske), undergo 38 months of training. The first 23 months qualify students as veterinary nursing assistants (veterinærsygehjælper) while the following 15 months culminate in the title of veterinary nurse. Training is by way of apprenticeship with formal classes taking place at the Kolding Center for Vocational Education. At present there is one specialty certification available in Clinical Ethology in Dogs and Cats which requires an additional two years of study. Representation is by way of a workers' union known as Veterinærsygeplejerskernes Landsklub. Licensure is required and administered by the Fødevarestyrelsen (Food Administration).
