= Paraveterinary workers in Turkey =

Veterinary technicians and technologists in Turkey are represented by Veteriner Saglik Teknisyenleri Dernegi (Association of Veterinary Technicians in Turkey). Veterinary technicians are trained in Veterinary Health Technology High Schools (Veteriner Sağlık Meslek Lisesi) of which there are four in the country:

- Istanbul Veterinary Health Technology High School
- Samsun Veterinary Health Technology High School
- Konya Veterinary Health Technology High School
- Isparta Veterinary Health Technology High School

Each of these high schools is equipped with a complete veterinary practice.

Veterinary technologists hold a university awarded associate degree for which graduation from a Veterinary Health Technology High School is prerequisite. Programs offering these degrees include:

- Anadolu University Laboratory and Veterinary Technology Program
- Atatürk University Animal Breeding and Health Program (which awards the title of Animal Health Technologist)
- Istanbul University Veterinary Faculty College Equine Health Technologists Program

While veterinary technicians and technologists function as support personnel for veterinarians in Turkey, some open their own limited practices where they are permitted to perform procedures such as vaccination, artificial insemination, animal health consulting, and male castration of livestock.
