= Maurice Allen =

British veterinarian

Maurice Allen FRCPath
- Born: 1937 (age 88–89)
- Occupation: Veterinary surgeon

Maurice Allen (born 1937) is a British veterinary surgeon.

== Career ==
Allen practised as a veterinary surgeon before obtaining a position in the Biochemistry Department of the Central Veterinary Laboratory and was working there during the 1967 foot-and-mouth outbreak.

From 1975 to 1984 he led the Department of Functional Pathology at the Institute for Animal Health.

He later set up Compton Paddock Laboratories, which provides services to the veterinary profession and farming industry.

He is a former president of the Association of Veterinary Research Workers, and served as examiner for the Royal College of Pathologists.
