= Paraveterinary workers in Switzerland =

Veterinary medical assistants in Switzerland (Tiermedizinische/r Praxisassistent/in / assistantes en médecine vétérinaire / assistenti medicina veterinari) organized in 1991 in Berne and are represented by the Swiss Association of Veterinary Medical Assistants (German: Vereinigung der schweizerischen tiermedizinischen Praxisassistentinnen, French: Association Suisse des assistantes en médecine vétérinaire, Italian: Associazione Svizzera di assistenti medicina Veterinari). The curriculum is offered in German in two or three schools and in French at a single site—Ecole Panorama in Lausanne—where students meet each Thursday starting in late August during a three-year apprenticeship for lessons in theory and one day per month for practical training. This training culminates in the award of the National Certificate [Eidgenössisches Fähigkeitszeugnis als gelernte/r / Certificat Fédéral de Capacité / Attestato federale di capacità (CFC)]in veterinary medical assisting.
