= Vanessa M. Hirsch =

Canadian-American veterinary pathologist and scientist

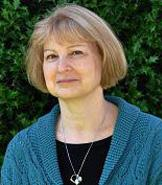
- Education: University of Saskatchewan (DVM); Harvard T.H. Chan School of Public Health (DSc)
- Scientific career
- Fields: AIDS pathogenesis, HIV vaccine development
- Workplaces: Georgetown University; National Institute of Allergy and Infectious Diseases
- Thesis: Structure of the simian immunodeficiency virus and its relationship to human immunodeficiency viruses (1987)

Vanessa M. Hirsch is a Canadian-American veterinary pathologist and scientist. She is a senior investigator and chief of the nonhuman primate virology section at the National Institute of Allergy and Infectious Diseases. Hirsch researches AIDS pathogenesis, the evolution and origins of primate lentiviruses, and HIV vaccine development.

== Education ==
Hirsch received a D.V.M. from the University of Saskatchewan in 1977 where she did a residency in pathology. She became board certified by the American College of Veterinary Pathologists in 1984. Hirsch earned her D.Sc. degree from Harvard T.H. Chan School of Public Health in 1988. Her dissertation was titled Structure of the simian immune immunodeficiency virus and its relationship to human immunodeficiency viruses.

== Career and research ==
Hirsch was a research assistant professor at Georgetown University until 1992, when she joined the National Institute of Allergy and Infectious Diseases Laboratory of Infectious Diseases, transferring to the Laboratory of Molecular Microbiology in 1999 and becoming tenured in 2002. She is a senior investigator and chief of the nonhuman primate virology section. Hirsch researches AIDS pathogenesis, the evolution and origins of primate lentiviruses, and HIV vaccine development.
