= Paraveterinary workers in Belgium =

Veterinary auxiliaries in Wallonia (the French-speaking region of the Kingdom of Belgium) are known as ASV—"assistantes veterinaires" (veterinary assistants). There is a single state-recognized program in Belgium organized by la Communauté Française de Belgique. This is a two-year program offered by l'Institut d'Enseignement de Promotion Sociale de la Communauté Française at Jupille. This program is still in its infancy, graduating its first class in June 2011. There are non-state sanctioned programs offered in private institutions in Flanders (the Flemish or Dutch speaking region of Belgium). Two of these programs, that offered at Katholieke Hogeschool Kempen in Geel and VIVES University of Applied Sciences in Roeselare, have received full accreditation from ACOVENE. At this time there is not a national organization representing veterinary assistants in Belgium. (Renaud Poizat, Dr. Vét. Lic. AESS biologie, program developer and instructor at l'Institut d'Enseignement, June 2010). There are regional organisations, like BaDiZo in Flanders.
