= Yamazaki University of Animal Nursing =

Private university in Tokyo, Japan

Coordinates: 35°36′36″N 139°22′27″E

Yamazaki University of Animal Nursing, ヤマザキ動物看護大学 (Yamazaki doubutsu kango daigaku) is a private university in Hachioji, Tokyo, Japan. It was established in 2009.
