= Robert L. Rooks =

American veterinarian

Robert L. Rooks is an American veterinarian. He is the founder of All-Care Animal Referral Center in Fountain Valley, Orange County, California. He is a diplomate of both the American Board of Veterinary Practitioners and the American College of Veterinary Surgeons.

Rooks developed a surgical procedure and specialized implant for the treatment for hip dysplasia in dogs. He also created an artificial beak for injured pelicans.

He is a co-author of the books Canine Orthopedics and Veterinary Cancer Therapy Handbook: Chemotherapy, Radiation Therapy, and Surgical Oncology for the Practicing Veterinarian.

Rooks has been recognized by the American Animal Hospital Association, which awarded him the Charles E. Bild Practitioner of the Year Award, the highest award given by the Association.

He is also part of the management team of Edgewater Foods.
