= Norwegian School of Veterinary Science =

University in Norway

Coordinates: 59°55′56″N 10°44′15″E

- Norges veterinærhøgskole
- Latin: Schola Veterinaria Norvegiae
- Type: Public University
- Active: 1936–2014
- Rector: Yngvild Wasteson
- Administrative staff: 450 (total)
- Students: 500
- Location: Oslo, Ås, Norway
- Campus: Adamstuen, Oslo, Ås, Viken

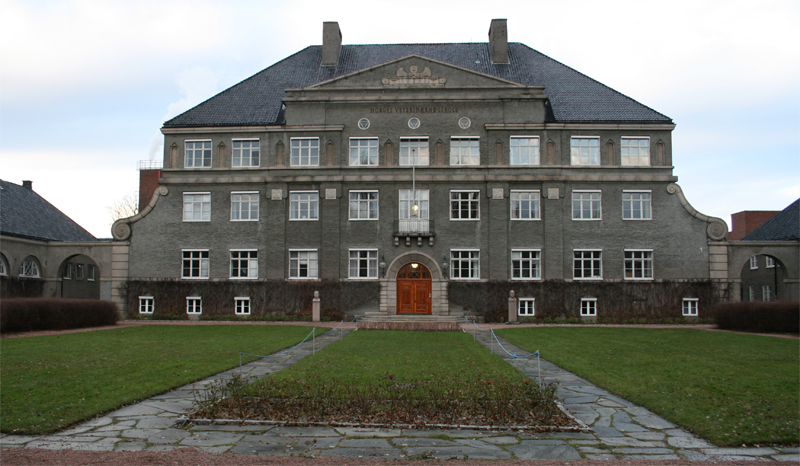

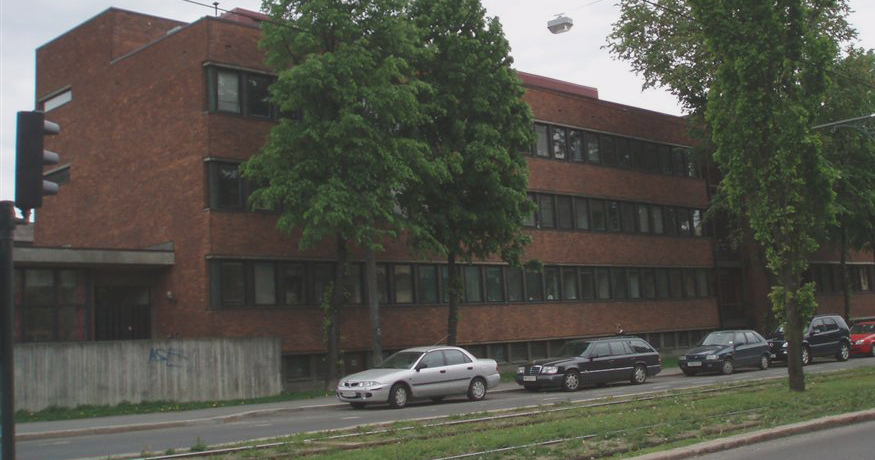
The institution in Oslo

Norwegian School of Veterinary Science (Norwegian: Norges veterinærhøgskole) or NVH was a public university located at Adamstuen in Oslo, that educated veterinarians and veterinary nurses as well as research within aquatic medicine, food safety, comparative medicine and mammalian diseases, health and welfare. The institution had about 450 employees and 500 students. Parts of the research were conducted in Tromsø and Sandnes.

On 6 January 2014 the school joined with the Norwegian University of Life Sciences in Ås, and by 2020 it will be completely relocated to the same location.

== Programs ==
=== Veterinary Medicine ===
A total of 70 students were accepted to the veterinary medicine courses each year at NVH. The program was a 5.5 to 6-year professional degree/ Master program leading to the title cand.med.vet. This is the only veterinary program in the country and one of the most difficult studies to be accepted into.

=== Veterinary nursing ===
NVH accepted 30 students each year for a two-year course in veterinary nursing.

=== Master of Science programs ===
The institution also offered two two-year Master programs within the fields of aquatic medicine and food safety. About 15 applicants were accepted on each of the two English language courses.

=== Doctor studies ===
About 15 candidates were awarded the Philosophiae Doctor each year from NVH. It was based on a 3+1 year model, with three years of studying and research, and one year of work.
