= List of schools of veterinary medicine =

This is a list of veterinary schools throughout the world by country.

== Afghanistan ==
- Bamyan University Veterinary Science Department
- Helman University Veterinary Science Faculty
- Herat University Veterinary Science Faculty
- Kabul University Veterinary Science Faculty
- Kandahar University Veterinary Science Faculty
- Khost University Veterinary Science Faculty
- Kunduz University Veterinary Science Faculty
- Mazar-e-Sharif University Veterinary Science Faculty
- Nangarhar University Veterinary Science Faculty

== Albania ==
- Agricultural University of Tirana Faculty of Veterinary Medicine
- WorldWide University Veterinary Science Programme

== Algeria ==
- Higher National Veterinary School
- Saad Dahlab University of Blida Department of Veterinary Sciences
- University of Batna Veterinary Department
- University of Ibn Khaldoun, Tiaret
- University of Mentouri – Constantine Faculty of Natural and Life Sciences
- University of Taref Veterinary Departement

== Angola ==
- José Eduardo dos Santos University Faculty of Veterinary Medicine

== Argentina ==
- Catholic University of Cordoba Faculty of Agricultural and Veterinary Sciences
- Catholic University of Cuyo, San Luis campus Faculty of Veterinary Sciences
- Juan Agustín Maza University Faculty of Veterinary and Environmental Sciences
- National University of Central Buenos Aires Faculty of Veterinary Sciences
- National University of La Pampa Faculty of Veterinary Sciences
- National University of La Plata Faculty of Veterinary Sciences
- National University of the Littoral Faculty of Veterinary Sciences
- National University of the Northeast Faculty of Veterinary Sciences
- National University of Río Cuarto Faculty of Agronomy and Veterinary Sciences
- National University of Rosario Faculty of Veterinary Sciences
- National University of Tucumán Faculty of Veterinary Sciences
- National University of Villa María Instituto Académico Pedagógico de Ciencias Básicas y Aplicadas
- University of Buenos Aires Faculty of Veterinary Sciences
- University of El Salvador Veterinary Medicine Course

== Australia ==
Australia has seven schools of veterinary medicine:

- Charles Sturt University School of Animal and Veterinary Sciences
- James Cook University, College of Public Health, Medical and Veterinary Sciences
- Murdoch University School of Veterinary and Life Sciences
- University of Adelaide School of Veterinary Science
- University of Melbourne Melbourne Veterinary School
- University of Queensland School of Veterinary Science
- University of Sydney Faculty of Veterinary Science

== Austria ==
- University of Veterinary Medicine Vienna

== Bangladesh ==
- Bangabandhu Sheikh Mujibur Rahman Agricultural University Faculty of Veterinary Medicine and Animal Science
- Bangabandhu Sheikh Mujibur Rahman Science and Technology University, Gopalganj
- Bangladesh Agricultural University Faculty of Veterinary Science
- Chittagong Veterinary and Animal Sciences University
- Gono University Faculty of Veterinary & Animal Sciences(Private University)
- Habiganj Agricultural University
- Hajee Mohammad Danesh Science & Technology University Faculty of Veterinary & Animal Science
- Jashore University of Science and Technology, Jhenidah, Bangladesh
- Khulna Agricultural University, Khulna
- Mawlana Bhashani Science and Technology University
- Patuakhali Science and Technology University Faculty of Animal science and veterinary medicine, Barishal campus
- Rajshahi University Faculty of Veterinary & Animal Sciences
- Sher-e-Bangla Agricultural University Faculty of Animal Science and Veterinary Medicine
- Sylhet Agricultural University Faculty of Veterinary, Animal and Biomedical Sciences

== Belarus ==
- Gorkovskii Agricultural Institute
- Vitebsk State Academy of Veterinary Medicine

== Belgium ==
- Faculty of Medicine, Université libre de Bruxelles, Anderlecht (undergraduate only)
- Faculty of Pharmaceutical, Biomedical, and Veterinary Science, University of Antwerp, Antwerp (undergraduate only)
- Faculty of Veterinary Medicine, Ghent University, Ghent
- Faculty of Veterinary Medicine, University of Liège, Liège
- School of Veterinary Medicine, Faculty of Science, UCLouvain, Louvain-la-Neuve (undergraduate only)

== Bolivia ==
- Autonomous University of Beni "José Ballivián" Faculty of Livestock Sciences
- Gabriel René Moreno Autonomous University Veterinary Sciences Faculty

== Bosnia and Herzegovina ==
- University of Sarajevo Veterinary Faculty

== Brazil ==
- Center of Higher Teaching of Campos Gerais Veterinary Medicine
- Centro Universitário Augusto Motta UNISUAM
- Estácio de Sá University
- Federal Rural University of Rio de Janeiro
- Federal University of Bahia
- Federal University of Goiás Veterinary and Husbandry School
- Federal University of Lavras Department of Veterinary Medicine
- Federal University of Minas Gerais
- Federal University of Pampa
- Federal University of Paraíba Center of Agricultural Sciences
- Federal University of Paraná
- Federal University of Pelotas College of Veterinary Medicine
- Federal University of Pernambuco
- Federal University of Rio Grande do Sul Faculty of Veterinary Sciences
- Federal University of Santa Maria Veterinary Medicine
- Federal University of Viçosa Veterinary Department
- Fluminense Federal University
- Paulista Júlio State University of Mesquita Filho, Botucatu campus Faculty of Veterinary Medicine and Husbandry
- Paulista Júlio State University of Mesquita Filho, Jaboticabal campus Faculty of Veterinary Medicine and Husbandry
- Pontifical Catholic University of Paraná School of Agriculture and Veterinary Medicine
- Santa Catarina State University Veterinary and Agricultural Center
- UNICENTRO – Universidade Estadual do Centro-Oeste do Paraná
- Universidade Estadual de Maringá
- University of Brasília Faculty of Agronomy and Veterinary Medicine
- Unimes - Universidade Metropolitana de Santos
- University of São Paulo Faculty of Veterinary Medicine / Faculty of Animal Science and Food Engineering (Pirassununga, SP)
- Vila Velha University
- Universidade Estadual do Ceará/ Faculdade de Veterinária (UECE/FAVET)

== Bulgaria ==
- Trakia University Faculty of Veterinary Medicine
- University of Forestry, Sofia Faculty of Veterinary Medicine

== Canada ==
Canada has five schools of veterinary medicine:

- Atlantic Veterinary College, University of Prince Edward Island
- Faculty of Veterinary Medicine, University of Calgary
- Ontario Veterinary College, University of Guelph
- Université de Montréal Faculty of Veterinary Medicine
- Western College of Veterinary Medicine, University of Saskatchewan

== Cayman Islands ==
- St. Matthew's University School of Veterinary Medicine

== Chile ==
- Austral University of Chile Faculty of Veterinary Sciences
- Mayor University Veterinary Medicine
- San Sebastián University Veterinary Medicine
- Santo Tomás University Veterinary Medicine
- University of the Americas Faculty of Veterinary Medicine and Agronomy
- University of Chile Faculty of Veterinary Sciences and Livestock
- University of Concepción Faculty of Veterinary Sciences

== China ==
- Animal Science and Veterinary Medicine College, Tianjin Agricultural University China
- China Agricultural University College of Veterinary Medicine, Beijing China
- College of Animal Husbandry and Veterinary Medicine Shenyang Agricultural University China
- College of Animal Science and Technology Anhui Agricultural University Hefei City China
- College of Animal Science and Technology Animal Diseases Institute China
- College of Animal Science and Technology Guangxi University China
- College of Animal Science and Technology Henan University of Science and Technology China
- College of Animal Science and Technology Qingdao Agricultural University China
- College of Animal Science and Veterinary Medicine Heilongjiang Bayi Agricultural University China
- College of Animal Science and Veterinary Medicine Henan Institute of Science and Technology China
- College of Animal Science and Veterinary Medicine Shanxi Agricultural University China
- College of Animal Science/Veterinary Medicine Shandong Agricultural University China
- The College of Veterinary Medicine at Nanjing Agricultural University (NAU) China
- College of Veterinary Medicine Hebei Agricultural University China
- College of Veterinary Medicine Huazhong Agricultural University China
- College of Veterinary Medicine Inner Mongolia Agricultural University China
- College of Veterinary Medicine Jiangxi Agricultural University China
- College of Veterinary Medicine Northwest A&F University China
- College of Veterinary Medicine, Sicau Sichuan Agriculture University China
- College of Veterinary Medicine, South China Agricultural University China
- College of Veterinary Medicine Southwest University China
- College of Veterinary Medicine Yangzhou University China
- Department of Animal Medicine Agricultural college of Yanbian University China
- Henan Agricultural University, College of Animal Husbandry and Veterinary Science Henan China
- Huazhong Agricultural University, College of Veterinary Medicine Wuhan · Hubei Province China
- Jiangsu–Yangzhou University, College of Veterinary Medicine Yangzhou, Jiangsu China
- Life Science and Engineering College Northwest University for Nationalities China
- Veterinary College Northeast Agricultural University China
- Veterinary Medicine Department, College of Life Science and Technology Southwest University for nationalities China
- Zhejiang Agricultural University College of Animal Science & Veterinary Medicine Hangzhou China

== Costa Rica ==
- Escuela de Medicina y Cirugía Veterinaria San Francisco de Asís, Universidad Veritas
- National University of Costa Rica School of Veterinary Medicine

== Croatia ==
- University of Zagreb Faculty of Veterinary Medicine

== Czech Republic ==
- University of Veterinary Sciences Brno

== Denmark ==
- Royal Veterinary and Agricultural University (1856–2007)
- UCPH School of Veterinary Medicine and Animal Science (2012–)

== Dominica ==
- St. Nicholas University, School of Veterinary Medicine

== Ecuador ==
- Central University of Ecuador
- San Francisco University of Quito
- Universidad Agraria del Ecuador
- Universidad de las Américas

== Egypt ==
- Alexandria University Faculty of Veterinary Medicine
- Assiut University Faculty of Veterinary Medicine
- Badr University Faculty of Veterinary Medicine
- Benha University Faculty of Veterinary Medicine
- Beni-Suef University Faculty of Veterinary Medicine
- Cairo University Faculty of Veterinary Medicine
- Damanhour University Faculty of Veterinary Medicine
- Kafr El-Sheikh University Faculty of Veterinary Medicine
- Mansoura University Faculty of Veterinary Medicine
- Menoufia University Faculty of Veterinary Medicine
- Minia University Faculty of Veterinary Medicine
- Sohag University Faculty of Veterinary Medicine
- South Valley University Faculty of Veterinary Medicine
- Suez Canal University Faculty of Veterinary Medicine
- Zagazig University Faculty of Veterinary Medicine

== Estonia ==
- Estonian University of Life Sciences Institute of Veterinary Medicine and Animal Sciences

== Ethiopia ==
- Addis Ababa University College of Veterinary Medicine
- Jimma University College of Agriculture and Veterinary Medicine
- Mekelle University College of Veterinary Medicine
- University of Gondar Faculty of Veterinary Medicine

== Finland ==
- University of Helsinki Faculty of Veterinary Medicine

== France ==
- Nantes-Atlantic National College of Veterinary Medicine, Food Science and Engineering (former National Veterinary School of Nantes)
- National Veterinary School of Alfort
- National Veterinary School of Lyon
- National Veterinary School of Toulouse

== Germany ==
- Free University of Berlin Department of Veterinary Medicine
- LMU Munich Faculty of Veterinary Medicine.
- University of Giessen Faculty of Veterinary Medicine
- University of Leipzig Faculty of Veterinary Medicine
- University of Veterinary Medicine Hanover

== Ghana ==
- Kwame Nkrumah University of Science and Technology, Kumasi, School of Veterinary Medicine
- University of Ghana School of Veterinary Medicine

== Greece ==
- Aristotle University of Thessaloniki Faculty of Veterinary Medicine
- University of Thessaly Faculty of Veterinary Medicine

== Grenada ==
- St. George's University School of Veterinary Medicine

== Hong Kong ==
- City University of Hong Kong College of Veterinary Medicine and Life Sciences

== Hungary ==
- University of Veterinary Medicine Budapest

== India ==
- Anand Agricultural University College of Veterinary Science and Animal Husbandry, Anand, Gujarat
- Assam Agricultural University Faculty of Veterinary Science
- Banaras Hindu University Faculty of Veterinary and Animal Sciences, Barkachha, Mirzapur
- Bihar Veterinary College
- Birsa Agricultural University Ranchi College of Veterinary Science and Animal Husbandry
- Bombay Veterinary College
- Central Agricultural University College of Veterinary Sciences and Animal Husbandry, Selesih
- Central Institute for Research on Buffaloes, Hisar, Haryana
- Central Sheep Breeding Farm, Hisar, Haryana
- Chaudhary Charan Singh Haryana Agricultural University College of Veterinary Sciences, Hisar
- CSK Himachal Pradesh Agricultural University Dr. G.C. Negi College of Veterinary and Animal Sciences
- Desh Bhagat University Desh Bhagat School of Veterinary Sciences, Mandi Gobindgarh, Punjab
- G. B. Pant University of Agriculture and Technology College of Veterinary and Animal Sciences
- Guru Angad Dev Veterinary and Animal Sciences Universi Indian Veterinary Research Institute
- Karnataka Veterinary, Animal and Fisheries Sciences University
  - Veterinary College, Bangalore
  - Veterinary College, Bidar
  - Veterinary College, Hassan
  - Veterinary College, Shivamogga
- Kerala Veterinary and Animal Sciences University
  - College of Veterinary and Animal Science, Thrissur
  - College of Veterinary and Animal Sciences, PookoteParel
- Lala Lajpat Rai University of Veterinary and Animal Sciences, Hisar
- Maharashtra Animal and Fishery Sciences University
  - Mumbai Veterinary College, Parel (Previously Bombay Veterinary College)
  - College of Veterinary and Animal Science, Udgir
  - College of Veterinary and Animal Sciences, Parbhani
  - K.N.P. College of Veterinary Sciences
  - Nagpur Veterinary College
  - Post Graduate Institute of Veterinary & Animal Sciences, Akola
- N. T. Rama Rao College of Veterinary Science
- Nanaji Deshmukh Veterinary Science University
  - College of Veterinary Science & Animal Husbandry, Jabalpur
  - College of Veterinary Science & Animal Husbandry, Mhow
- National Dairy Research Institute, Karnal
- National Research Centre on Equines, Hisar
- Navsari Agricultural University College of Veterinary Science and Animal Husbandry, Navsari, GUJARAT
- Rajasthan University of Veterinary and Animal Sciences
- Rajendra Agricultural University
- Rajiv Gandhi College of Veterinary and Animal Sciences
- Sardarkrushinagar Dantiwada Agricultural University College of Veterinary Science & Animal Husbandry, GUJARAT
- SK University of Agricultural Sciences and Technology of Kashmir Faculty of Veterinary Sciences and Animal Husbandry
- Sri Venkateswara University
  - College of Veterinary Science, Gannavaram
  - College of Veterinary Science, Hyderabad
  - College of Veterinary Science, Korutla
  - College of Veterinary Science, Tirupati
- Tamil Nadu Veterinary and Animal Sciences University
  - Madras Veterinary College
  - Veterinary College and Research Institute at Orathanau in Thanjavur
  - Veterinary College and Research Institute at Ramayanpatti in Tirunelveli
  - Veterinary College and Research Institute, Namakkal
  - Veterinary College and Research Institute, Salem
  - Veterinary College and Research Institute, Udumalaipettai
  - Veterinary College and Research Institute, Theni
- Uttar Pradesh Pandit Deen Dayal Upadhyaya Pashu Chikitsa Vigyan Vishwavidyalaya Evam Go College of Veterinary Science & Animal Husbandry
- West Bengal University of Animal and Fishery Sciences

== Indonesia ==
- Airlangga University Faculty of Veterinary Medicine
- Gadjah Mada University, Faculty of Veterinary Medicine
- Hasanuddin University, Faculty of Veterinary Medicine
- IPB University (Bogor Agricultural University), School of Veterinary Medicine and Biomedical Sciences
- Nusa Cendana University, Undana Faculty of Veterinary Medicine
- Syiah Kuala University, Faculty of Veterinary Medicine
- Udayana University, Faculty of Veterinary Medicine
- University of Brawijaya, Faculty of Veterinary Medicine
- State University of Padang, Department of Veterinary Medicine
- University of Mandalika, Faculty of Veterinary Medicine
- University of Padjadjaran Bandung, Department of Veterinary Medicine
- University of Riau, Department of Veterinary Medicine
- University of Wijaya Kusuma Surabaya, Faculty of Veterinary Medicine

== Iran ==
- Amol University of Special Modern Technologies, Faculty of Veterinary Medicine, Amol
- Babol Branch of the Islamic Azad University, Faculty of Veterinary Medicine
- Baft Branch of the Islamic Azad University, Faculty of Veterinary Medicine
- Garmsar Branch of the Islamic Azad University, Faculty of Veterinary Medicine
- Karaj Branch of the Islamic Azad University, Faculty of Veterinary Medicine
- Kazerun Branch of the Islamic Azad University, Faculty of Veterinary Medicine
- Razi University of Kermanshah Faculty of Veterinary Medicine
- Sanandaj Branch of the Islamic Azad University, Faculty of Veterinary Medicine
- Science and Research Branch of the Islamic Azad University, Faculty of Specialized Veterinary Medicine
- Shabestar Branch of the Islamic Azad University, Faculty of Veterinary Medicine
- Shahid Chamran University of Ahvaz Faculty of Veterinary Medicine
- Shahrekurd Branch of the Islamic Azad University, Faculty of Veterinary Medicine
- Shoushtar Branch of the Islamic Azad University, Faculty of Veterinary Medicine
- Tabriz Branch of the Islamic Azad University, Faculty of Veterinary Medicine
- Urmia Branch of the Islamic Azad University, Faculty of Veterinary Medicine
- University of Kerman Faculty of Veterinary Medicine
- University of Mashhad Faculty of Veterinary Medicine
- University of Semnan Faculty of Veterinary Medicine
- University of Shahrekord Faculty of Veterinary Medicine
- University of Shiraz School of Veterinary Science
- University of Tabriz Faculty of Veterinary Medicine
- University of Tehran Faculty of Veterinary Medicine
- University of Urmia Faculty of Veterinary Medicine

== Iraq ==
- College of Veterinary Medicine, University of Baghdad
- College of Veterinary Medicine, University of Basrah
- College of Veterinary Medicine, University of Diyala
- College of Veterinary Medicine, University of Fallujah
- College of veterinary medicine, University of Kufa
- College of Veterinary Medicine, University of Mosul
- College of Veterinary Medicine, University of Tikrit

== Ireland ==
- University College Dublin, UCD School of Veterinary Medicine

== Israel ==
- Hebrew University of Jerusalem Koret School of Veterinary Medicine

== Italy ==
- University of Bari Faculty of Veterinary Medicine
- University of Bologna Faculty of Veterinary Medicine
- University of Camerino Faculty of Veterinary Medicine
- University of Messina Faculty of Veterinary Medicine
- University of Milan Faculty of Veterinary Medicine
- University of Naples Federico II Faculty of Veterinary Medicine
- University of Padua Faculty of Veterinary Medicine
- University of Parma Faculty of Veterinary Medicine
- University of Perugia Faculty of Veterinary Medicine
- University of Pisa Faculty of Veterinary Medicine
- University of Sassari Faculty of Veterinary Medicine
- University of Teramo Faculty of Veterinary Medicine
- University of Turin Faculty of Veterinary Medicine

== Japan ==
Seventeen institutions in Japan have schools of veterinary medicine:

- Azabu University School of Veterinary Medicine
- Gifu University, United School of Veterinary Sciences
- Hokkaido University Graduate School of Veterinary Medicine
- Iwate University, Department of Veterinary Medicine
- Kagoshima University, Department of Veterinary Medicine
- Kitasato University School of Veterinary Medicine
- Nihon University, Department of Veterinary Medicine
- Nippon Veterinary and Life Science University, Department of Veterinary Science
- Obihiro University of Agriculture and Veterinary Medicine, School of Veterinary Medicine
- Okayama University of Science
- Osaka Prefecture University, Graduate School of Life & Environmental Sciences
- Rakuno Gakuen University School of Veterinary Medicine
- Tokyo University of Agriculture and Technology, United Graduate School of Veterinary Sciences
- Tottori University, School of Veterinary Medicine
- University of Miyazaki Faculty of Agriculture, Department of Veterinary Sciences
- University of Tokyo, Faculty of Agriculture, Department of Veterinary Medical Sciences
- Yamaguchi University, Department of Veterinary Medicine

== Jordan ==
- Jordan University of Science and Technology Faculty of Veterinary Medicine

== Kenya ==
- University of Nairobi Faculty of Veterinary Medicine

== Kosovo ==
- University of Prishtina Faculty of Agriculture and Veterinary

== Lebanon ==
- Lebanese University Faculty of Agricultural Engineering and Veterinary Medicine

== Libya ==
- Omar Al-Mukhtar University Faculty of Veterinary Medicine
- University of Alfateh Faculty of Veterinary Medicine

== Lithuania ==
- Lithuanian University of Health Sciences

== Malaysia ==
- Kelantan University, Malaysia Faculty of Veterinary Medicine
- Putra University, Malaysia Faculty of Veterinary Medicine

== Mexico ==
- Autonomous Agrarian University of "Antonio Narro" Unidad Laguna Faculty of Veterinary Medicine and Zootechnics
- Autonomous University of Aguascalientes Center for Agricultural Sciences
- Autonomous University of Baja California Institute of Investigations in Veterinary Sciences
- Autonomous University of Juárez City Institute of Biomedical Sciences
- Autonomous University of Mexico State Faculty of Veterinary Medicine and Zootechnics
- Autonomous University of Nuevo León Faculty of Veterinary Medicine and Zootechnics
- Autonomous University of Querétaro Faculty of Natural Sciences
- Autonomous University of Tamaulipas Faculty of Veterinary Medicine and Zootechnics
- Autonomous University of Yucatán Faculty of Veterinary Medicine and Zootechnics
- Autonomous University of Zacatecas Faculty of Veterinary Medicine and Zootechnics
- Centro de Estudios Universitarios Faculty of Veterinary Medicine and Zootechnics
- Meritorious Autonomous University of Puebla Faculty of Veterinary Medicine and Zootechnics
- Metropolitan Autonomous University, Xochimilco Division of Biological Sciences and Health
- Michoacana University of San Nicolás of Hidalgo Division for Biological and Agricultural Sciences
- National Autonomous University of Mexico Faculty of Veterinary Medicine and Zootechnics
- National Autonomous University of Mexico Graduate School of Cuautitlán
- Sonora Institute of Technology Department of Agricultural and Veterinary Sciences
- Universidad Veracruzana Faculty of Veterinary Medicine and Zootechnics
- University of Guadalajara University Center for Biological and Agricultural Sciences
- University of the Valley of Mexico, Coyoacán School of Veterinary Medicine and Zootechnics

== Moldova ==
- Technical University of Moldova Faculty of Veterinary Medicine

== Morocco ==
- Institut Agronomique et Vétérinaire Hassan-II

== Myanmar ==
- University of Veterinary Science, Yezin

== Nepal ==
- Agriculture and Forestry University
- Himalayan College of Agricultural Science and Technology
- Institute of Agriculture and Animal Science
- Nepal Polytechnic Institute, Bharatpur 11 Chitwan

== Netherlands ==
- University of Utrecht Faculty of Veterinary Medicine

== New Zealand ==
- Massey University Faculty of Veterinary Science

== Nigeria ==
- Ahmadu Bello University Zaria, Kaduna
- Federal University of Agriculture, Abeokuta, Ogun
- Federal University of Agriculture Makurdi, Benue
- Michael Okpara University of Agriculture, originally the Federal University of Agriculture, Umudike, Abia State
- University of Abuja, Abuja
- University of Ibadan, Oyo
- University of Ilorin, Kwara
- University of Jos, Plateau State
- University of Maiduguri, Borno
- University of Nigeria Nsukka. Enugu state
- Usmanu Danfodiyo University Sokoto, Sokoto

== North Macedonia ==
- Saints Cyril and Methodius University of Skopje Faculty of Veterinary Medicine

== Norway ==
- Norwegian School of Veterinary Science

== Pakistan ==
- Bahauddin Zakariya University
- Cholistan University of Veterinary and Animal Sciences, Bahawalpur
- College of Veterinary and Animal Sciences, Jhang
- Faculty of Veterinary and Animal Sciences (FVAS), MNS University of Agriculture, Multan
- Gomal College of Veterinary Sciences
- Islamia University
- Lasbela University of Agriculture, Water and Marine Sciences
- Pir Mehr Ali Shah Arid Agriculture University
- Riphah College of Veterinary Sciences
- Sindh Agriculture University
- University of Agriculture, Faisalabad
- University of Agriculture, Peshawar
- University of Poonch
- University of Veterinary and Animal Sciences

== Panama ==
- Facultad de Medicina Veterinaria Universidad de Panamá

== Peru ==
- Cayetano Heredia University Veterinary and Zootechnic Faculty
- National University of San Marcos Faculty of Veterinary Medicine
- Scientific University of the South Veterinary Medicine and Zootechnics
- Universidad Nacional Pedro Ruiz Gallo (UNPRG) Faculty of Veterinary Medicine

== Philippines ==
=== North and Central Luzon ===
- Benguet State University, College of Veterinary Medicine
- Bulacan Agricultural State College, College of Veterinary Medicine
- Cagayan State University – Carig Campus, College of Veterinary Medicine
- Central Luzon State University, College of Veterinary Science and Medicine
- Don Mariano Marcos Memorial State University – North Campus, La Union Campus, College of Veterinary Medicine
- Isabela State University, School of Veterinary Medicine
- Nueva Vizcaya State University, Doctor of Veterinary Medicine
- Pampanga State Agricultural University, College of Veterinary Medicine
- Tarlac Agricultural University, Institute of Veterinary Medicine
- Virgen Milagrosa University Foundation. College of Veterinary Medicine

=== South Luzon and Bicol Region ===
- Cavite State University, College of Veterinary Medicine and Biomedical Sciences
- Bicol University – Ligao Campus, College of Veterinary Medicine
- Central Bicol State University of Agriculture, Institute of Veterinary Medicine
- Southern Luzon State University – Catanauan Campus, College of Veterinary Medicine
- University of the Philippines Los Baños, College of Veterinary Medicine
- Western Philippines University – College of Veterinary Medicine, Aborlan, Palawan.

=== Metro Manila ===
- De La Salle Araneta University, College of Veterinary Medicine and Agricultural Sciences

=== Mindanao ===
- Central Mindanao University College of Veterinary Medicine
- University of Southern Mindanao College of Veterinary Medicine University of Southern Mindanao
- Western Mindanao State University, Zamboanga City

=== Visayas ===
- Aklan State University, School of Veterinary Medicine
- Capiz State University – Dumarao Campus, Doctor of Veterinary Medicine
- Cebu Technological University – Barili Campus, College of Agriculture and Veterinary Sciences
- Southwestern University – South Campus, College of Veterinary Medicine
- University of Eastern Philippines College of Veterinary Medicine
- Visayas State University College of Veterinary Medicine

== Poland ==
- University Center of Veterinary Medicine of the Jagiellonian University and Agricultural University of Cracow
- Nicolaus Copernicus University in Toruń Institute of Veterinary Medicine
- University of Life Sciences in Lublin Faculty of Veterinary Medicine
- University of Life Sciences in Poznan Faculty of Veterinary Medicine and Animal Science
- University of Warmia and Mazury in Olsztyn Faculty of Veterinary Medicine
- Warsaw University of Life Sciences Faculty of Veterinary Medicine
- Wroclaw University of Environmental and Life Sciences Faculty of Veterinary Medicine

== Portugal ==
Portugal has six schools of veterinary medicine:

- Escola Universitária Vasco da Gama Department of Veterinary Medicine
- Universidade Lusófona, Faculty of Veterinary Medicine
- University of Évora, Department of Veterinary Medicine
- University of Lisbon Faculty of Veterinary Medicine
- University of Porto Abel Salazar Biomedical Sciences Institute
- University of Trás-os-Montes and Alto Douro School of Agrarian and Veterinary

== Romania ==
- Ion Ionescu de la Brad University of Life Sciences of Iași Faculty of Veterinary Medicine
- King Michael I University of Life Sciences in Timișoara Faculty of Veterinary Medicine
- University of Agricultural Sciences and Veterinary Medicine of Cluj-Napoca Faculty of Veterinary Medicine
- University of Agronomic Sciences and Veterinary Medicine of Bucharest Faculty of Veterinary Medicine

== Saint Kitts ==
- Ross University School of Veterinary Medicine

== Saudi Arabia ==
- King Faisal University College of Veterinary Medicine and Animal Resources

== Senegal ==
- Interstate University of Veterinary Science and Medicine in Dakar

== Serbia ==
- University of Belgrade Faculty of Veterinary Medicine
- University of Novi Sad Faculty of Agriculture

== Slovakia ==
- University of Veterinary Medicine in Košice

== Slovenia ==
- University of Ljubljana Faculty of Veterinary Medicine

== South Africa ==
- University of Pretoria Faculty of Veterinary Science

== South Korea ==
- Chonnam National University College of Veterinary Medicine
- Chungbuk National University College of Veterinary Medicine
- Chungnam National University College of Veterinary Medicine
- Gyeongsang National University College of Veterinary Medicine
- Jeju National University College of Veterinary Medicine
- Jeonbuk National University College of Veterinary Medicine
- Kangwon National University College of Veterinary Medicine
- Konkuk University College of Veterinary Medicine
- Kyungpook National University College of Veterinary Medicine
- Seoul National University College of Veterinary Medicine

== Spain ==
- Alfonso X el Sabio University Veterinary Faculty
- Autonomous University of Barcelona Veterinary Faculty
- CEU Cardinal Herrera University Veterinary Faculty
- Complutense University of Madrid Veterinary Faculty
- University of Córdoba Veterinary Faculty
- University of Extremadura Veterinary Faculty
- University of Las Palmas de Gran Canaria Veterinary Faculty
- University of León, Faculty of Veterinary Medicine
- University of Murcia Veterinary Faculty
- University of Santiago de Compostela, Faculty of Veterinary Medicine
- University of Zaragoza Veterinary Faculty

== Sri Lanka ==
- University of Peradeniya Faculty of Veterinary Medicine and Animal Science

== Sudan ==
- Sudan University of Science and Technology College of Veterinary Medicine
- University of Albutana Faculty of Veterinary Medicine
- University of Bahri Faculty of Veterinary Medicine
- University of Gezira Faculty of Veterinary Medicine
- University of Khartoum Faculty of Veterinary Medicine
- University of Nyala Faculty of Veterinary Medicine
- University of West Kordofan Faculty of Veterinary Medicine

== Sweden ==
- Swedish University of Agricultural Sciences Faculty of Veterinary Medicine

== Switzerland ==
- University of Bern Faculty of Veterinary Medicine
- University of Zurich Faculty of Veterinary Medicine

== Taiwan ==
- National Chiayi University Department of Veterinary Medicine
- National Chung Hsing University College of Veterinary Medicine
- National Pingtung University of Science and Technology College of Veterinary Medicine
- National Taiwan University School of Veterinary Medicine

== Thailand ==
- Chiang Mai University Faculty of Veterinary Science
- Chulalongkorn University Faculty of Veterinary Science
- Kasetsart University Faculty of Veterinary Medicine
- Khon Kaen University Faculty of Veterinary Medicine
- Mahanakorn University of Technology Faculty of Veterinary Science
- Mahasarakham University Faculty of Veterinary Medicine and Animal Science
- Mahidol University Faculty of Veterinary Science
- Prince of Songkla University Faculty of Veterinary Science
- Rajamangala University of Technology Srivijaya Faculty of Veterinary Science
- Rajamangala University of Technology Tawan-ok Faculty of Veterinary Science
- Walailak University Akkraratchakumari Veterinary College
- Western University Faculty of Veterinary Science

== Trinidad and Tobago ==
- University of the West Indies at St. Augustine School of Veterinary Medicine

== Turkey ==
- Adnan Menderes University Faculty of Veterinary Medicine
- Ankara University Faculty of Veterinary Medicine
- Atatürk University Faculty of Veterinary Medicine
- Balıkesir University Faculty of Veterinary Medicine
- Bingöl University Faculty of Veterinary Medicine
- Cumhuriyet University Faculty of Veterinary Medicine University
- Dicle University Faculty of Veterinary Medicine
- Erciyes University Faculty of Veterinary Medicine
- Fırat University Faculty of Veterinary Medicine
- Harran University Faculty of Veterinary Medicine
- Istanbul University Faculty of Veterinary Medicine
- Kafkas University Faculty of Veterinary Medicine University
- Kırıkkale University Faculty of Veterinary Medicine
- Kocatepe University Faculty of Veterinary Medicine
- Mehmet Akif Ersoy University Faculty of Veterinary Medicine
- Mustafa Kemal University Faculty of Veterinary Medicine
- Ondokuz Mayıs University Faculty of Veterinary Medicine
- Selçuk University Faculty of Veterinary Medicine
- Uludağ University Faculty of Veterinary Medicine
- Yüzüncüyıl University Faculty of Veterinary Medicine

== Tunisia ==
- National School of Veterinary Medicine of Sidi Thabet

== Uganda ==
- Makerere University School of Veterinary Medicine

== Ukraine ==
- Bila Tserkva National Agrarian University Faculty of Veterinary Science
- Dnipro State Agricultural And Economic University Faculty of Veterinary Science
- Luhansk National Agrarian University Faculty of Veterinary Science
- National University of Life and Environmental Sciences of Ukraine Faculty of Veterinary Science
- Odesa State Agrarian University Faculty of Veterinary Science
- Polissia National University Faculty of Veterinary Science
- Sumy National Agricultural University Faculty of Veterinary Science

== United Kingdom ==
=== England ===
- Harper Adams University & Keele University Harper & Keele Veterinary School
- University of Bristol School of Veterinary Science
- University of Cambridge Veterinary School
- University of Central Lancashire School of Veterinary Medicine
- University of Liverpool Faculty of Veterinary Science
- University of London Royal Veterinary College
- University of Nottingham School of Veterinary Medicine and Science
- University of Surrey School of Veterinary Medicine

=== Scotland ===
- University of Edinburgh Royal (Dick) School of Veterinary Studies
- University of Glasgow School of Veterinary Medicine
- Scotland's Rural College (SRUC)

=== Wales ===
- University of Aberystwyth School of Veterinary Science

== United States ==
Thirty-six veterinary colleges in the United States are fully or provisionally accredited by the American Veterinary Medical Association.

- Ana G. Méndez University, School of Veterinary Medicine
- Arkansas State University, College of Veterinary Medicine
- Auburn University, College of Veterinary Medicine
- Clemson University, College of Veterinary Medicine
- Colorado State University, College of Biomedical and Veterinary Medicine
- Cornell University, New York State College of Veterinary Medicine
- Iowa State University, College of Veterinary Medicine
- Kansas State University, College of Veterinary Medicine
- Lincoln Memorial University, Richard A. Gillespie College of Veterinary Medicine
- Long Island University, Lewyt College of Veterinary Medicine
- Louisiana State University, School of Veterinary Medicine
- Michigan State University, College of Veterinary Medicine
- Midwestern University, College of Veterinary Medicine
- Mississippi State University, College of Veterinary Medicine
- North Carolina State University, College of Veterinary Medicine
- Ohio State University, College of Veterinary Medicine
- Oklahoma State University, College of Veterinary Medicine
- Oregon State University, Gary R. Carlson, MD, College of Veterinary Medicine
- Purdue University, College of Veterinary Medicine
- Rowan University, Shreiber School of Veterinary Medicine
- Texas A&M University, College of Veterinary Medicine & Biomedical Sciences
- Texas Tech University, School of Veterinary Medicine
- Tufts University, Cummings School of Veterinary Medicine
- Tuskegee University, College of Veterinary Medicine
- University of Arizona, College of Veterinary Medicine
- University of California, Davis, School of Veterinary Medicine
- University of Florida, College of Veterinary Medicine
- University of Georgia, College of Veterinary Medicine
- University of Illinois Urbana-Champaign, College of Veterinary Medicine
- University of Minnesota, College of Veterinary Medicine
- University of Missouri, College of Veterinary Medicine
- University of Pennsylvania, School of Veterinary Medicine
- University of Tennessee, College of Veterinary Medicine
- University of Wisconsin–Madison, School of Veterinary Medicine
- Utah State University, College of Veterinary Medicine
- Virginia Tech/University of Maryland, College Park, Virginia–Maryland College of Veterinary Medicine
- Washington State University, College of Veterinary Medicine
- Western University of Health Sciences, College of Veterinary Medicine

== Venezuela ==
- Central University of Venezuela Faculty of Veterinary Science
- Francisco de Miranda National Experimental University Faculty of Veterinary Sciences
- Lisando Alvarado Western Central University Faculty of Veterinary Sciences
- Rómulos Gallegos National Experimental University of the Central Plains Faculty of Veterinary Sciences
- University of Zulia Faculty of Veterinary Science

== See also ==
- Lists of universities and colleges by country
