= Natesan Punniamurthy =

Natesan Punniamurthy is a veterinarian and researcher from Tamil Nadu, India. The Government of India has conferred upon him the Padma Shri award for the year 2026 in recognition of his distinguished service in the field of veterinary medicine.

== Education ==
Punniamurthy hails from Thanjavur, Tamil Nadu. He earned his Bachelor’s and Master’s degrees in Veterinary Science, as well as a Ph. D. in research, from the Madras Veterinary College in Chennai. He served as a professor at the Tamil Nadu Veterinary and Animal Sciences University (TANUVAS) research center located in Thanjavur.

== Awards ==
- 2026: Padma Shri – Government of India
- 2019: Lifetime Achievement Award – Veterinary Council of India
- 2013: Tamil Nadu Scientist Award – Tamil Nadu State Council for Science and Technology, Chennai
