= Rajiv Gandhi College of Veterinary and Animal Sciences =

Educational institution in Puducherry, India

Rajiv Gandhi Institute of Veerinary Education and Research
- Motto: Animaux Soignes Hommes Aimes
- Motto in English: Animals should be treated like humans
- Type: Veterinary Sciences and Animal Husbandry education; Research Institute; Public
- Established: 1994
- Affiliation: Pondicherry University
- Administrative staff: 51
- Location: Kurumbapet, Puducherry, India; 11°56′16″N 79°45′49″E
- Website: www.river.edu.in

Rajiv Gandhi Institute of Veterinary Education and Research (RIVER) (formerly Rajiv Gandhi College of Veterinary and Animal Sciences, RAGACOVAS) is a veterinary college in Puducherry (formerly Pondicherry), India. Founded in 1994 in accordance to the standards of Veterinary medicine education in India, set by the Veterinary Council of India, the college is affiliated to the Pondicherry University. It is an educational institute for imparting undergraduate and masters specializations in veterinary medicine and animal husbandry, as well as having a veterinary hospital/clinic providing veterinary health care in the region.

== History ==
The college was inaugurated on the auspicious day of Vijayadasami that fell on 14 October 1994 at a rented building at Ponlait, Kurumbapet, Puducherry and christened as the Pondicherry Veterinary College. The first batch intake of the college was 30. The campus is spread out at two locations, with classrooms at the Ponlait campus and laboratory facilities at the Krishi Vignan Kendra campus.

Pondicherry Veterinary College was rechristened as the Rajiv Gandhi College of Veterinary and Animal Sciences, named after Rajiv Gandhi, in a state function presided over by Sonia Gandhi. In due time, a full-fledged 59-acre (240,000 m^{2}) campus was established adjoining the Krishi Vignan Kendra campus at Kurumbapet, Puducherry. In 2013, RAGACOVAS was renamed as RIVER (Rajiv Gandhi Institute of Veterinary Education and Research).

The clinical training facility was established after a veterinary hospital run by the Animal Husbandry Department of Puducherry State Government was taken over by the college to establish a full-fledged teaching hospital for imparting veterinary clinical training to the students.

This college, also known as RAGACOVAS, was recognized by the Veterinary Council of India on 25 November 1999 and the first batch of students passed out with 25 veterinary graduates and their Bachelor of Veterinary Sciences and Animal Husbandry (B.V.Sc and A.H.) degrees recognized by and included under the first schedule of the Indian Veterinary Council (IVC) act.

The college has 56 faculty members mentoring and educating students in 18 academic departments. RAGACOVAS also offers higher education training through Masters in Veterinary Science (M.V.Sc.) programs.

== Campus location ==
The campus is spread across three locations. The main campus adjoining the Krishi Vignan Kendra campus on the Thirukanur Road, at Kurumbapet which is 6 km from the Pondicherry bus station and the railway station. The campus can be reached by buses from Pondicherry to Thirukkanur.

The main campus houses Campus A and B. Campus A consists of the administrative block, departments, central library, herbal garden, mini-zoo and the livestock farm. Campus B consists of the ICAR block, student hostels, dean's quarters, faculty and non-teaching staff quarters, playground, gymnasium/badminton Court and basketball court. The teaching hospital campus is in the industrial estate at Mettupalayam. The campus can also be reached through Vazhudhavoor Road.

== Academics ==
There are 18 departments:

- Department of Veterinary Anatomy and Histology
- Department of Veterinary Physiology
- Department of Veterinary Biochemistry
- Department of Veterinary Pharmacology and Toxicology
- Department of Veterinary Parasitology
- Department of Veterinary Pathology
- Department of Veterinary Microbiology
- Department of Veterinary Public Health
- Department of Animal Nutrition
- Department of Animal Genetics and Breeding
- Department of Livestock Production and Management
- Department of Livestock Products Technology
- Department of Animal Reproduction Gynaecology and Obstetrics
- Department of Veterinary Surgery and Radiology
- Department of Clinical Veterinary Medicine, Ethics and Jurisprudence
- Department of Veterinary Epidemiology and Preventive Medicine
- Department of Veterinary and Animal Husbandry Extension Education
- Department of Avian Production and Management

== Deans ==
- 1994 to 1999: Dr. R. Sabarinathan Nair
- 1999 to August 2008: Dr. G. Butchaih
- August 2008 to June 2009: Dr. P.V. Sreenivasiah, interim in-charge dean)
- July 2009 to June 2010 Dr. M. Dominic Savio Jegam, interim in-charge dean)
- July 2011 to 2014: Dr. T.P. Thilagan
- June2014-Nov2017: Dr. B. Ramesh Kumar, Ph.D. (Veterinary Surgery)
- May 2022 – April 2025 : Dr.Sejian Veerasamy MVSc., PhD., Post-Doc (USA & Australia)

== Admission procedure and education system ==
=== B.V.Sc and A.H. ===
B.V.Sc and A.H. stands for Bachelor of Veterinary Sciences and Animal Husbandry and is a Doctor of Veterinary Medicine equivalent. Presently, RIVER admits a total of 60 students; 30 students from the Union Territory of Puducherry through Joint Entrance Test (JET) conducted by Centralized Admission Committee CENTAC, Government of Puducherry; five seats are allotted through an All-India Common Entrance test conducted by the Veterinary Council of India; five seats are allotted to students from Goa; five seats for the students from Nagaland; and five NRI seats admitted through an entrance test conducted by RAGACOVAS. Total intake for an academic year is 55 to 60. The education is through a semester system spanning ten semesters (4.5 years) followed by a compulsory rotatory internship for a period of six months.

=== M.V.Sc. ===
M.V.Sc. (Master of Veterinary Sciences) admission is available for eight academic specializations and is through an entrance test. The masters programme is offered in the departments of Veterinary Biochemistry, Veterinary pathology, Veterinary Microbiology, Animal Husbandry Extension, Livestock Products Technology, Veterinary Surgery and Radiology, and Veterinary Clinical Medicine. In each department two seats are given to the candidates belonging to the union territory of Puducherry and one seat for the candidates from other states. A fellowship amount or Rs.3000/-is supposed to be given to the candidates belonging to the state of Puducherry and the candidates belonging to the other states.

== Campus life ==
Students from all across India study at RAGACOVAS. The day scholars are mostly students who hail from Puducherry; students from other states and districts of Puducherry board at hostels. The campus has separate hostels for men and women.

The campus provides indoor and outdoor recreation facilities. There is a basketball court, an indoor shuttle badminton court, and a gymnasium.

Bus services transport students from across the town to the campus.

== Landmarks ==
- First veterinary college in India to adopt the course curriculum advocated by the Veterinary Council of India, as per minimum standards of veterinary education in India.
- Recognized by the Veterinary Council of India in 1999.
- Masters in Veterinary Science initiated in January 2005.
- 24 May 2006: added to the American Veterinary Medical Association list of veterinary colleges of the world.
- Review on landless livestock farming by women in Southern states of India published at FAO.

== Alumni activities ==
RAGACOVAS alumni interact through a website.

== See also ==
- Karnataka Veterinary, Animal and Fisheries Sciences University
- Kerala Veterinary College, Mannuthy
- Madras Veterinary College
- West Bengal University of Animal and Fishery Sciences
