= Miguel Cordero del Campillo =

Spanish veterinarian (1925–2020)

Miguel Cordero del Campillo (12 January 1925 – 12 February 2020) was a Spanish veterinarian and politician who served as an independent Senator from 1977 to 1979, and as rector of the University of León between 1984 and 1986. He pioneered research into parasitology in Spain, and was recognised as an expert in parasitology.

Cordero del Campillo was born in 1925 in Vegamián, in the Province of León, Spain. He studied veterinary medicine at the veterinary faculty of the University of León, and graduated in 1947, before receiving his doctorate from Madrid in 1952. In 1963, he became a professor at the veterinary faculty of the University of León. From 1983 to 1984, he was vice-rector of the University of León, and from 1984 to 1984 was rector, the position of highest academic authority at the university.

In 1978, he was awarded the Civil Order of Alfonso X, the Wise and in 1985 the Grand Cross of the Civil Order of Health.
