= Mohamed Abdelhafid Henni =

Algerian politician

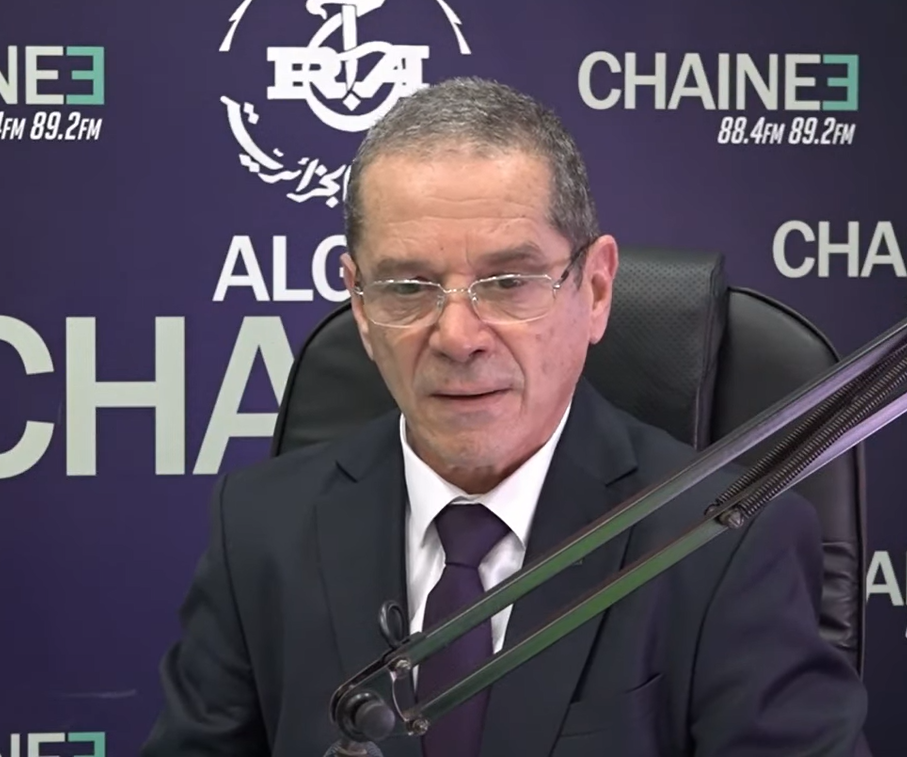
- Mohamed Abdelhafid Henni talking into a microphone

Minister of Agriculture and Rural Development
- Incumbent
- Assumed office 9 September 2022
- President: Abdelmadjid Tebboune
- Prime Minister: Aymen Benabderrahmane; Nadir Larbaoui
- Preceded by: Abdelhamid Hamdani

Personal details
- Born: August 17, 1956 (age 70)
- Education: Higher National Veterinary School (Dr)

Mohamed Abdelhafid Henni (born 17 August 1956) is the Algerian Minister of Agriculture and Rural Development. He was appointed as minister on 9 September 2022.

== Education ==
Henni holds a Diploma of Advanced Studies in Biochemistry and a Doctorate in Veterinary Medicine from the Higher National Veterinary School.
