= Madras Veterinary College =

College in Tamil Nadu, India

Tamil Nadu Veterinary and Animal Sciences University
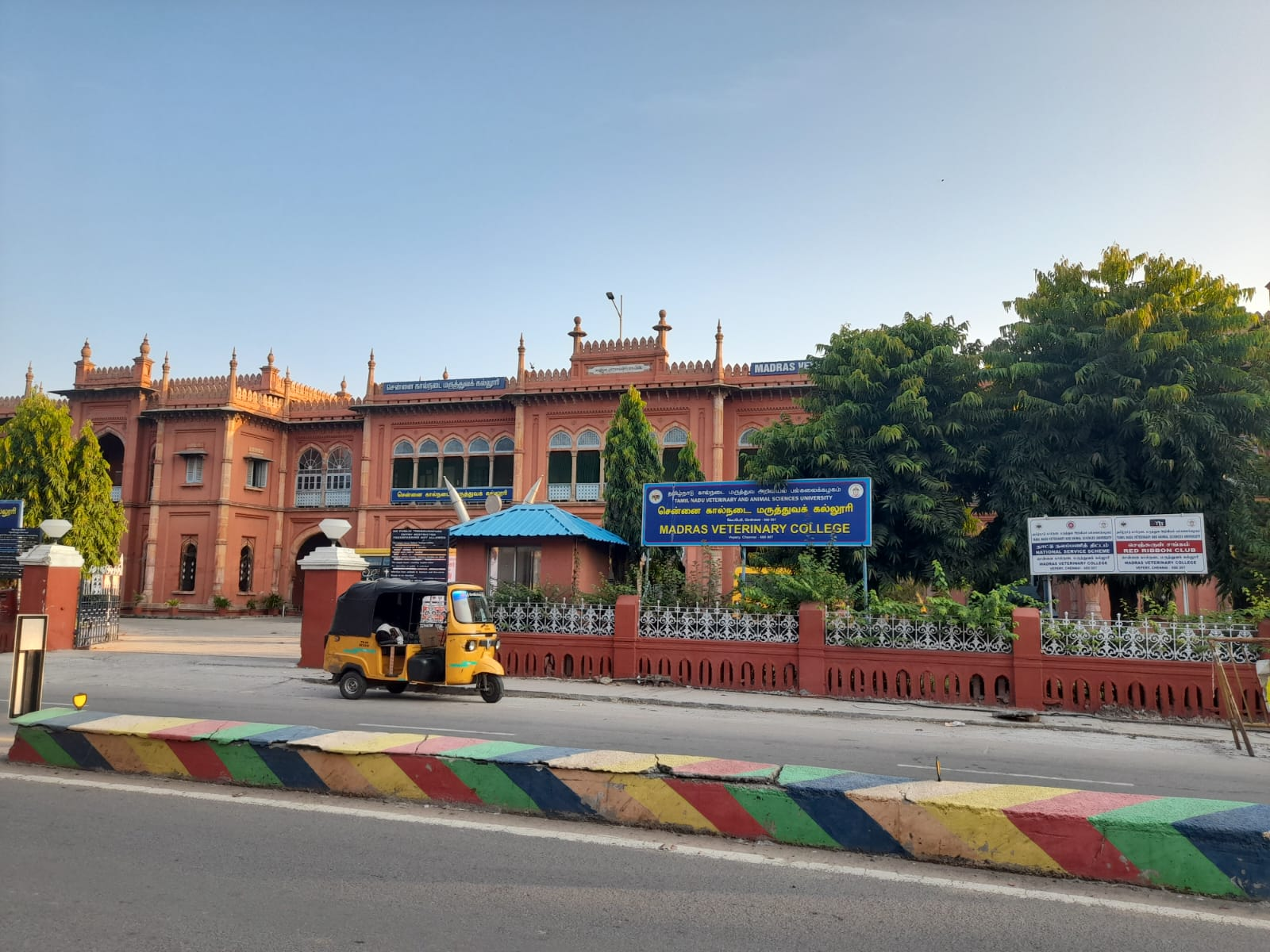
- Established: 1 October 1903; 123 years ago
- Affiliations: University of Madras
- Dean: R. Karunakaran
- Location: Vepery, Tamil Nadu, India; 13.0857°N 80.2666°E
- Website: www.tanuvas.tn.nic.in/index.html

The Madras Veterinary College, the college affiliated with Tamil Nadu Veterinary and Animal Sciences University, is a veterinary college in Vepery, a suburb of Chennai, Tamil Nadu, India. The college was established on 1 October 1903 in a small building known as Doblin Hall.

The college became affiliated with the University of Madras in 1936 and became the first college to offer the bachelor's degree in Veterinary Medicine in India. In 1989, the first veterinary university in India, Tamil Nadu Veterinary and Animal Sciences University (TANUVAS), was formed, and the college became affiliated with it. The current dean is R. Karunakaran, who has held the post since September 2021.

== Courses offered ==
1. B.VSc & AH
2. M.VSc
3. Ph.D
4. PG Diploma in Companion Animal Practice

== MVC Teaching Hospital ==
The MVC Teaching Hospital is the largest in the country with extensive facilities. The animal hospital is equipped with radiology, ultrasonography, doppler ultrasound, CT Scan, echocardiogram, video endoscopy, laparoscopy, and small animal surgery facilities. Additionally, the hospital has a haemodialysis facility for small animals and a special rabies ward.

The veterinary hospital receives referral cases from all over India, including horses, domestic ruminants, and small animals. Mobile clinic facilities are also available.

== See also ==
- Karnataka Veterinary, Animal and Fisheries Sciences University
- Kerala Veterinary College, Mannuthy
- Rajiv Gandhi College of Veterinary and Animal Sciences
- West Bengal University of Animal and Fishery Sciences
