= Manuel B. García Alvarez =

Manuel B.García Álvarez

Ombudsman of Castile and Leon
- In office 1995–2005
- Preceded by: -
- Succeeded by: Francisco Amoedo

Personal details
- Born: 16 August 1943 (age 82) Oviedo, Spain
- Education: University of Oviedo

Manuel B. García Álvarez is a Spanish jurist and emeritus university professor, of the department of Constitutional Law of the University of León. He was the first Ombudsman (Procurador del Común) of Castile and León between 1995 and 2005.

== Biography ==
Alvarez studied at the University of Oviedo from 1960 to 1965 and was awarded a degree in law, having been appointed assistant professor at the University of Leon. After a course in Advanced European Studies at the College of Europe in Bruges from 1967 to 1968, he was awarded a Doctor of Law at the University of Oviedo in 1971 with a thesis titled: Los clubs políticos en Europa : contribución al estudio de las fuerzas póliticas (Political Clubs in Europe: Contribution to the Study of Political Forces).

From September 1974 to February 1976, Alvarez was Visiting Research Associate at Harvard University on the Scholarship programme of cultural cooperation. In 1980 he was granted the same scholarship, but to take it up he had to renounce having been appointed professor assistant at the University of Leon, where in 1988 he was granted the Chair of Constitutional Law at the University of Leon.

From 1976 until his retirement he was member of the Board of Editors of the East European Quarterly of the University of Colorado.

In 1985, Alvarez took part in the signing of an agreement between the Voronezh State University and Leon, which allowed him to develop an important task of research in the Russian Federation. Among others he worked as foreign expert both in the constitutional commission and in the constitutional assembly created in the summer of 1993 by President Boris Yeltsin.

In 1995, Alvarez was appointed by the Cortes of Castile and León as Procurador del Común (Ombudsman) of that Autonomous region, where he remained until his retirement in the year 2012.

== Bibliography ==
Alvarez has written the following books:

- García Alvarez, Manuel B. (1980). Las constituciones de los países socialistas. León: Celarayn. ISBN 9788485378043. OCLC 8134071.
- Alvarez, Manuel B García (1991). Las reformas jurídico-políticas en la URSS (1988-1991). Cuadernos y debates, 32 (in Spanish). Madrid: Centro de Estudios Constitucionales. ISBN 9788425908859. OCLC 1255243132.
- Alvarez, Manuel B. García (1991). Constituciones extranjeras contemporáneas. Colección Práctica jurídica (in Spanish) (2a. ed.). Madrid: Tecnos. ISBN 8430920609. OCLC 31261250.
- García Alvarez, Manuel B. (1978). Construcción del comunismo y constitución. Publicaciones (Colegio Universitario de León. Unidad de Investigación), 9. (in Spanish). León: Colegio Universitario. ISBN 8460010872. LCCN 79109914. OCLC 5846052.
- García Alvarez, Manuel B. (1977). Textos constitucionales socialistas. Publicaciones (Colegio Universitario de León. Unidad de Investigación); 4. León: Colegio Universitario de León. ISBN 846000810X. LCCN 87153182. OCLC 17804986.
- García Alvarez, Manuel B. (1973). Los clubs políticos en Europa. Publicaciones del Fondo para la Investigación Económica y Social de la Confederación Española de Cajas de Ahorro; 51 (in Spanish). Madrid: Confederación Española de Cajas de Ahorro. ISBN 8472310914. OCLC 1850489.

Alvarez has co-written the following monograph:

- García Álvarez, Manuel; García López, Rubén (1 June 2012). "Apuntes sobre una reforma de la configuración constitucional del Defensor del Pueblo : un paso más hacia la Justicia Social". Teoría y Realidad Constitucional (29): 373. doi:10.5944/trc.29.2012.6996.

Alvarex has written the following newspaper articles:

- Álvarez, Manuel B. García (1 October 1990). "Soberanía y unión" (in Spanish). Ediciones El País, S.L. El País.
- Alvarez, Manuel B. García (23 July 2020). "Нет более важного элемента, чем родной язык" [There is no more important element than the mother tongue] (in Russian). Kommyha.
