= University of Veterinary Medicine Vienna =

Coordinates: 48°15′19″N 16°25′53″E

University of Veterinary Medicine
- Veterinärmedizinische Universität Wien
- Type: Public
- Established: 1767
- Administrative staff: 670
- Students: 2800
- Location: Vienna, Austria
- Website: http://www.vetmeduni.ac.at/en/

The University of Veterinary Medicine Vienna (German: Veterinärmedizinische Universität Wien - in short: VUW) was founded in 1767 as the world's third school for veterinary medicine (after Lyon and Alfort) by Milan's Ludovico Scotti, originally named k. k. Pferde-Curen- und Operationsschule (literally, "Imperial-Royal School for the Cure and Surgery of Horses"). Today, it has c. 2,800 students and c. 600 employees.

== Spin-offs ==
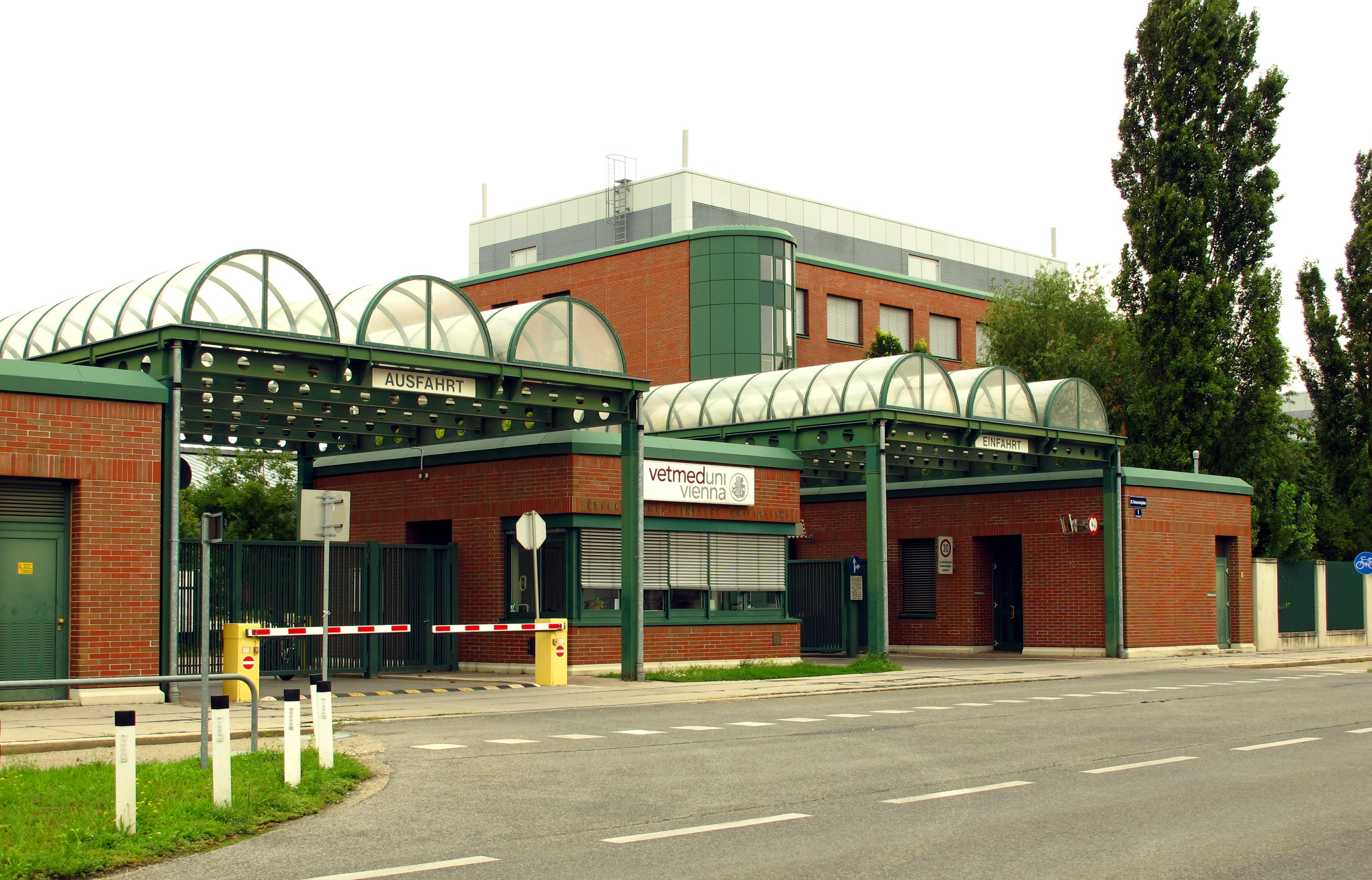
University of Veterinary Medicine Vienna

Since 2002, universities in Austria can found spin-off companies. Most of the spin-off companies are still located on the university's grounds: Animal Health IT, Biomodels Austria, Innovaphyt, Marinomed, Mycosafe, Novelix, VetWIDI, VirBiomed, ViruSure

The university also operates the Teaching and Research Farms outside of Vienna.

== See also ==
- Schools of veterinary medicine

== Notable alumni ==
- Herbert Haupt - Austrian politician
