= List of academic institutions formerly affiliated to the University of Calcutta =

The following is a list of academic institutions formerly affiliated to the University of Calcutta, in Kolkata, India:

- Acharya Brojendra Nath Seal College
- Armenian College
- Barasat Government College
- Bareilly College
- Bengal Engineering College
- Bengal Veterinary College
- Bidhannagar College
- Brajalal College
- Calcutta National Medical College
- Carmichael College, Rangpur
- Chittagong College
- Comilla Victoria College
- Cotton College, Guwahati
- Dhaka College
- Govt. Azizul Haque College
- Government College, Lahore
- Hislop College, Nagpur
- Holkar Science College, Indore
- Thomason College of Civil Engineering
- Indian Statistical Institute, Calcutta
- Kumudini College, Tangail
- Medical College Calcutta
- Midnapore College
- Mohammadan Anglo Oriental College
- Mohindra College, Patiala
- Morris College, Nagpur
- Murari Chand College, Sylhet
- Nawab Jassa Singh Ahluwalia Government College, Kapurthala (1857-1882)
- Nil Ratan Sarkar Medical College and Hospital
- Presidency College, Kolkata
- R. G. Kar Medical College and Hospital
- Rajshahi College
- Ravenshaw College, Cuttack
- Royal College Colombo
- St. Stephen's College, Delhi
- Suri Vidyasagar College
- Tripura Engineering College
- Rangoon College
