= University of Missouri College of Veterinary Medicine =

Coordinates: 38°56′28.67″N 92°19′2.94″W

- Type: Public
- Established: 1946
- Parent institution: University of Missouri
- Affiliations: American Veterinary Medical Association
- Dean: Srinand Sreevatsan
- Location: Columbia, Missouri, United States
- Campus: Urban, college town
- Website: cvm.missouri.edu

The College of Veterinary Medicine at the University of Missouri is a school of veterinary medicine in Columbia, Missouri. It is one of only 30 veterinary colleges in the United States accredited by the American Veterinary Medical Association and only one in Missouri. In 2019, U.S. News & World Report ranked the school the 19th-best veterinary school in the United States.

== Veterinary Health Center ==
The MU Veterinary Health Center encompasses a 24-hr emergency room, a small animal hospital, an equine hospital, a food animal hospital, a medical diagnostic laboratory. A partnership with the Adair County Humane Society was announced in 2019.
