= Veterinary College, Bengaluru =

Veterinary College Bangalore
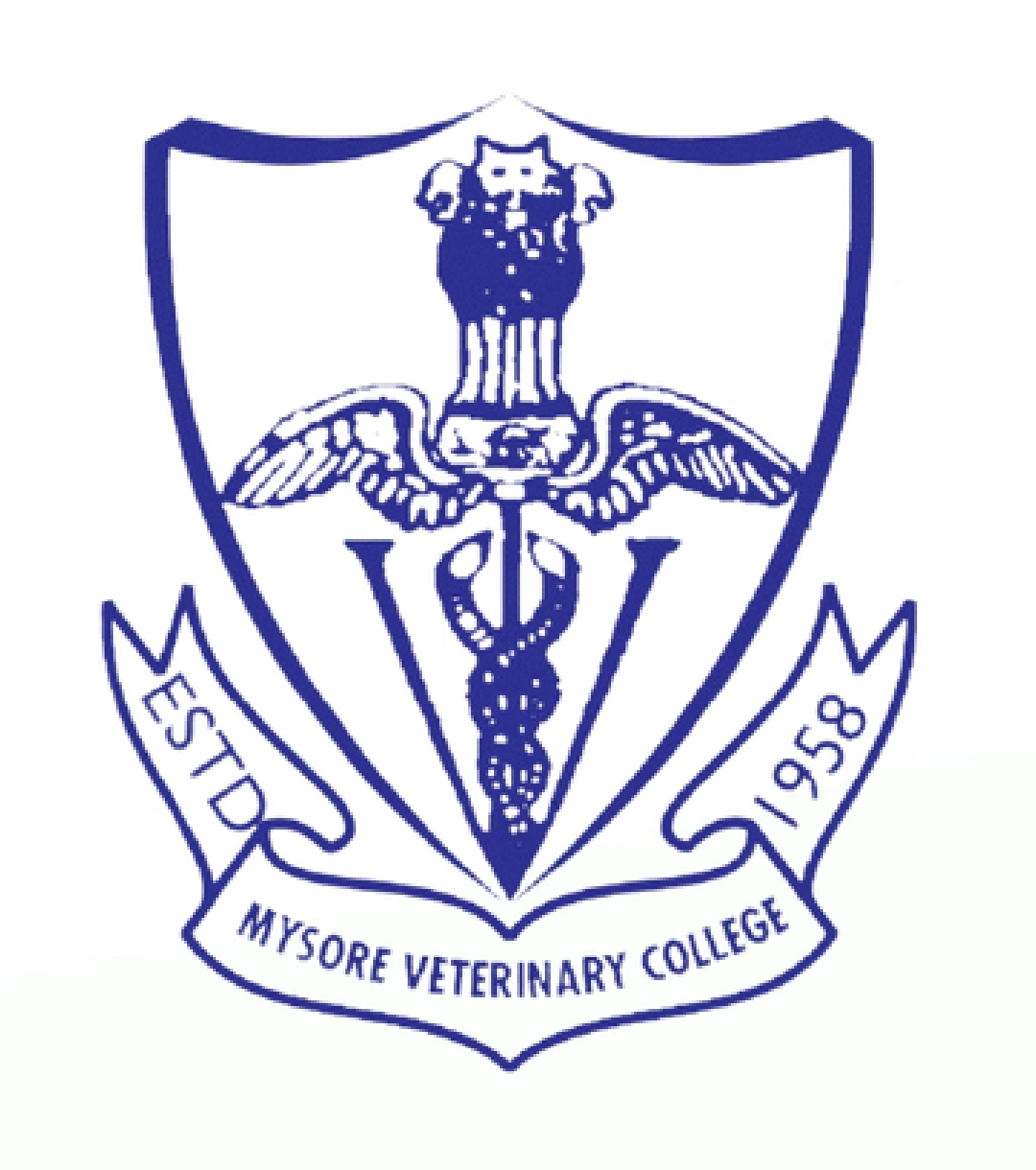
- Former names: Mysore Veterinary College
- Type: Public
- Established: 25 July 1958
- Founders: Maharaja Shri Jaya Chamarajendra Wodeyar
- Affiliations: Karnataka Veterinary, Animal and Fisheries Sciences University
- Chancellor: Governor of Karnataka
- Vice-Chancellor: Dr. K. C. Veeranna (KVAFSU)
- Dean: Dr N K Shivakumar Gowda
- Undergraduates: ~4000
- Postgraduates: ~1200
- Location: Bengaluru, Karnataka, India; 13°1′45.7″N 77°35′6.0″E
- Campus: 196 acres; Urban
- Website: https://www.kvafsu.edu.in/vch_bengaluru.html

The Veterinary College, Bangalore was established on 25 July 1958 affiliated with Mysore University. The college started in a temporary shed located in the then Mysore Serum Institute, now called the institute of Animal Health and Veterinary Biologicals, Hebbal. The Veterinary College became a constituent college of the University of Agricultural Sciences in 1965. It became part of the newly established Karnataka Veterinary, Animal and Fisheries Sciences University, Bidar from April 2005. The college is located on the Bangalore to Hyderabad highway at a distance of about 7 km. from Vidhana Soudha.

There are 19 departments in the college –

- Veterinary Anatomy
- Veterinary Biochemistry
- Veterinary Physiology
- Veterinary Microbiology
- Veterinary Parasitology
- Veterinary Pharmacology
- Veterinary Public Health
- Veterinary Pathology
- Veterinary Medicine
- Veterinary Surgery and Radiology
- Veterinary Gynaecology and Obstetrics
- Veterinary extension education
- Livestock production Management
- Livestock products Technology
- Veterinary Nutrition
- Animal Genetics and Breeding
- Poultry Science
- Wildlife Medicine

The courses offered are B.V.Sc. & A.H. (Bachelor of Veterinary Science and Animal husbandry), M.V.Sc. (Master of Veterinary Science) and Ph.D. (Doctor of Philosophy). The college follows the course structure laid down by the Veterinary Council of India.
