= University of Calgary Faculty of Veterinary Medicine =

Canadian university faculty

Faculty of Veterinary Medicine
- Type: Veterinary school
- Established: 2005; 21 years ago
- Affiliations: University of Calgary
- Dean: Dr. Renate Weller
- Location: Calgary, Alberta, Canada
- Website: www.vet.ucalgary.ca

The Faculty of Veterinary Medicine is a Canadian veterinary school located in Calgary, Alberta at the University of Calgary.

The faculty was established in the wake of an outbreak of Bovine spongiform encephalopathy (BSE) traced to feedlots in Alberta from 1993 to 2005. Prior to the establishment of the Faculty of Veterinary Medicine at the University of Calgary, the only veterinary school in western Canada was the Western College of Veterinary Medicine at the University of Saskatchewan.

The faculty is based on the University of Calgary's Spy Hill campus. Facilities are being improved due to the construction of a new Veterinary Learning Commons building. On its completion, the number of student training seats will increase from 50 to 100.
