= Western College of Veterinary Medicine =

- Type: Public
- Established: 1965; 61 years ago
- Affiliations: University of Saskatchewan
- Location: Saskatoon, Saskatchewan, Canada; 52°7′47.37″N 106°37′58.08″W
- Campus: Urban
- Colours: Green & white
- Nickname: Saskatchewan Huskies
- Mascot: Huskie
- Website: wcvm.usask.ca

The Western College of Veterinary Medicine (WCVM) is a Canadian veterinary school within the University of Saskatchewan in Saskatoon, Saskatchewan. It serves the provinces and territories of Western Canada and Northern Canada except for Alberta, which has its own veterinary school.

== Programs ==
WCVM serves three western Canadian provinces of British Columbia, Saskatchewan and Manitoba as well as the territories of Yukon, Northwest Territories and Nunavut; it also served Alberta until 2023. These provinces and territories each subsidize a select number of seats for students from these areas.

The college houses the WCVM Veterinary Medical Centre, which comprises both a small animal and a large animal clinic. The clinics serve a dual purpose: providing primary and specialized veterinary services to the public, and being a platform for clinical learning for the veterinary students.

== History ==
WCVM opened in 1965, with the first veterinarians graduating in 1969. It was the second English-speaking veterinary college to be established in Canada.

Originally, the WCVM also served Alberta but this changed with the establishment of the University of Calgary Faculty of Veterinary Medicine in 2005. Alberta consequently pulled funding from the WCVM, which saw the last class of students with dedicated Albertan seats graduate in 2023.

International students were briefly admitted into the school, with international veterinary students in the classes of 2025 and 2026.

== See also ==
- University of Saskatchewan
