= Faculty of Veterinary Medicine, University of León =

- Facultad de Veterinaria, Universidad de León
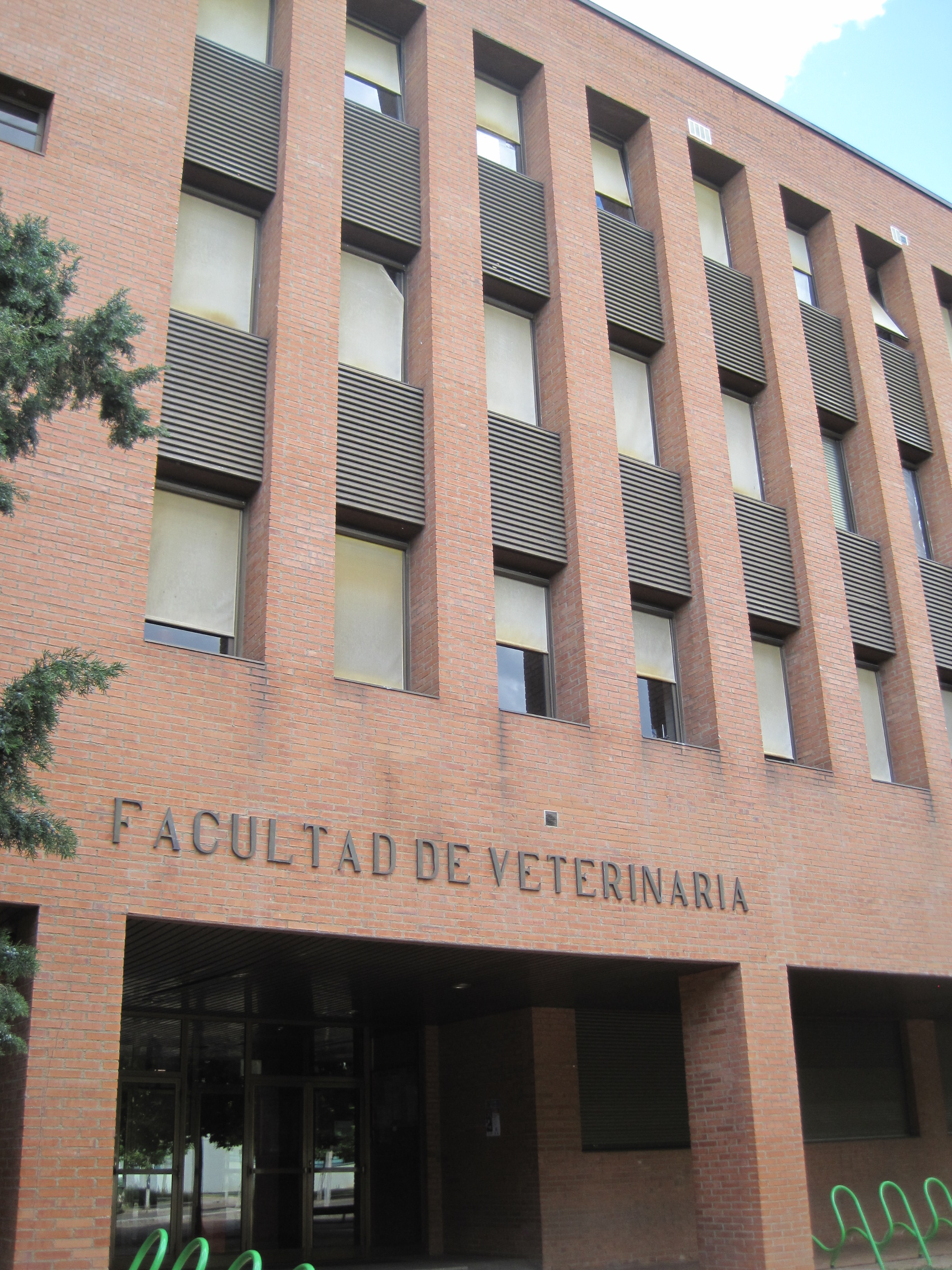
- Main building of the veterinary faculty of the University of León
- Type: Faculty of veterinary science
- Established: 1852
- Affiliation: University of León
- Location: León, Province of León, Castile and León, Spain; 42°36′48″N 5°33′28″W
- Website: centros.unileon.es/veterinaria/

The Faculty of Veterinary Medicine, University of León is a veterinary school in Spain. It is part of the University of León, and is situated in the university campus of Vegazana.

The faculty and was founded by Royal Order on 16 March 1852, as the veterinary school in León, in the San Marcos convent, where it remained until 1860. It was the fourth veterinary faculty to be established in Spain.

In 2017, the faculty was approved by the European Association of Establishments for Veterinary Education as meeting the minimum European standards for veterinary training, as set out in EU law. It was the last of Spain's public veterinary schools to achieve this distinction.
