= West Bengal University of Animal and Fishery Sciences =

University in West Bengal, India

- পশ্চিমবঙ্গ প্রাণী এবং মৎস্য বিজ্ঞান বিশ্ববিদ্যালয়
- Type: Public Veterinary University
- Established: c. 1893; 133 years ago (as Bengal Veterinary College); 2 January 1995; 31 years ago (as WBUAFS)
- Accreditation: ICAR
- Academic affiliations: UGC; AIU
- Budget: ₹52.02 crore (US$5.4 million) (2023-24 est.)
- Chancellor: Governor of West Bengal
- Vice-Chancellor: Tirtha Kumar Datta
- Faculty: 124 (2025)
- Students: 1,062 (2025)
- Undergraduates: 787 (2025)
- Postgraduates: 187 (2025)
- Doctoral students: 88 (2025)
- Location: Kolkata & Mohanpur, West Bengal, India; 22°36′23″N 88°23′14″E
- Campus: Urban
- Website: wbuafscl.ac.in

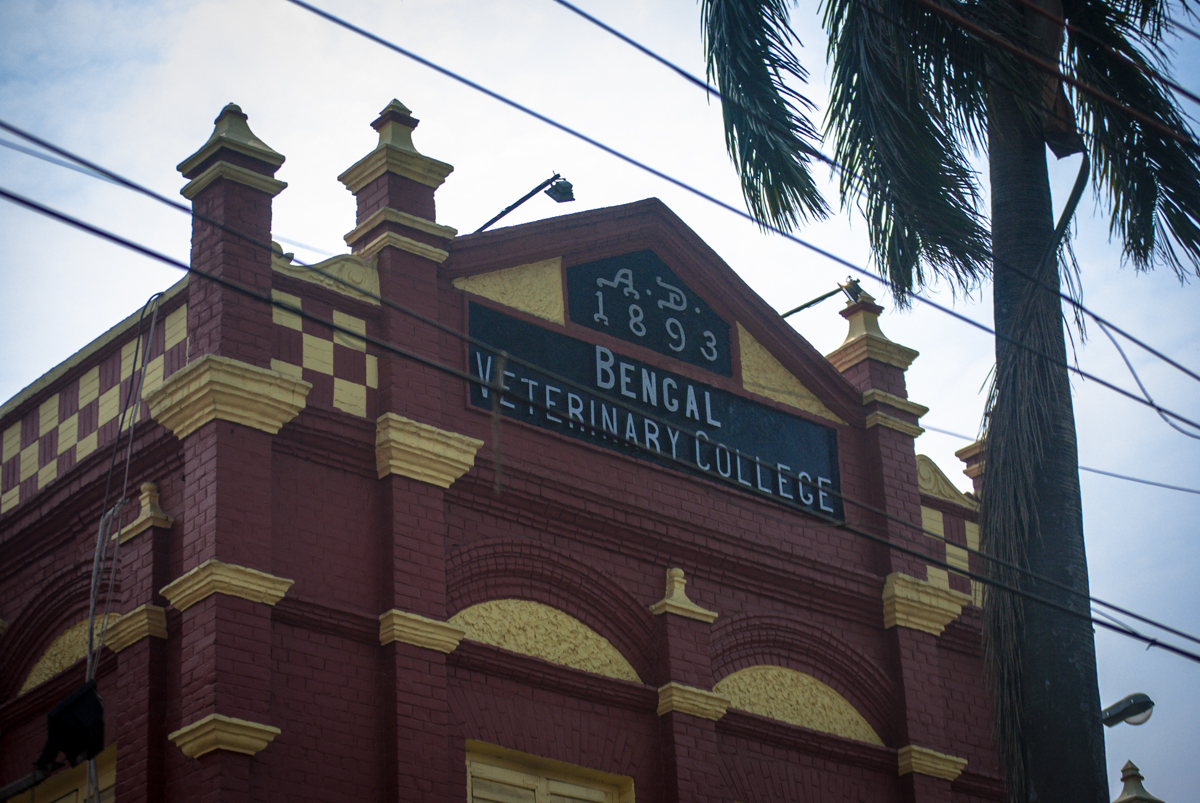
Bengal Veterinary College, the earlier name of the institute

The West Bengal University of Animal and Fishery Sciences (WBUAFS) is a public state veterinary university in West Bengal, India. It was established on 2 January 1995 by an Act of the West Bengal legislature. It imparts education and training in veterinary and animal sciences, dairy sciences, and fishery sciences.

== History ==
Before the establishment of the West Bengal University of Animal and Fishery Sciences, veterinary education in West Bengal was imparted by Bengal Veterinary College. Bengal Veterinary College, established in 1893, was a premier veterinary institution in the country. It was the second oldest veterinary college in the country and the college was expanded, enriched, and functioned under the University of Calcutta until 1974. In 1974, the college was merged with Bidhan Chandra Krishi Vishwavidyalaya in Mohanpur, district Nadia, as a Faculty of Veterinary and Animal Sciences.

In 1993, a Working Group was constituted by the Animal Resources Development Department of the Government of West Bengal to discuss the modalities for the establishment of a separate animal science university. As per the recommendations of the Working Group, the state government established the West Bengal University of Animal and Fishery Sciences (WBUAFS) vide the West Bengal University of Animal & Fishery Sciences Act, 1995 by separating veterinary and animal science departments from the Bidhan Chandra Krishi Vishwavidyalaya (BCKV). Subsequently, the West Bengal University of Animal and Fishery Sciences came into being on 2 January 1995 with a legacy of century-old Bengal Veterinary College.

The present university has three distinct faculties situated at different positions of the West Bengal: Faculty of Veterinary and Animal Sciences (situated at Belgachia, Kolkata & Mohanpur, Nadia), Faculty of Fishery Sciences (situated at Chakgaria, Kolkata), and Faculty of Dairy Technology (situated at Mohanpur, Nadia). The headquarter of the university is situated in Belgachia, Kolkata.

== Organisation and Administration ==
=== Governance ===
The Governor of West Bengal is the chancellor of the West Bengal University of Animal and Fishery Sciences & the Vice-chancellor is the chief executive officer of the university. Shyam Sundar dana is the current Vice-chancellor of the university.

=== Faculties and Departments ===
Different departments of the West Bengal University of Animal and Fishery Sciences (WBUAFS) has organized into three faculties:

Faculties	Departments
Faculty of Veterinary & Animal Scinces	Veterinary Anatomy; Veterinary Pathology; Veterinary Biochemistry; Animal Nutrition; Veterinary Pharmacology & Toxicolog; Veterinary Physiology; Veterinary Microbiology; Veterinary Parasitology; Animal Genetics & Breeding; Veterinary Medicine; Veterinary Public Health & Epidemiology; Livestock Production Management; Livestock Product Technology; Veterinary Gynaecology & Obstetrics; Veterinary Surgery & Radiology; Veterinary & Animal Husbandry Extension Education; Livestock Farm Complex; Veterinary Clinical Complex; Animal Biotechnology; Avian Sciences
Faculty of Dairy Technology	Dairy Microbiology; Dairy Technology; Dairy Engineering; Dairy Chemistry; Dairy Business Management
Faculty of Fishery Sciences	Fishery Resource Management; Aquaculture; Aquatic Animal Health; Fish Processing Technology; Fishery Engineering; Fishery Economics and Statistics; Fishery Extension; Aquatic Environment Management; Fish Nutrition

=== Directorate of Research, Extension and Farms ===
The university is actively engaged in research and extension activities through the Directorate of Research, Extension and Farms functioning with three Krishi Vigyan Kendra's (Jalpaiguri, Murshidabad, and Uttar 24 Parganas). The university is equipped with modern laboratory facilities, animal hospital, and Farms.

== Academics ==
=== Courses ===
The West Bengal University of Animal and Fishery Sciences (WBUAFS) offers different diploma, undergraduate and postgraduate courses:

- Two-year Diploma Course: Diploma in Veterinary Pharmacy (D.V.P)
- Five and half years Undergraduate (Bachelor) Degree Courses: Bachelor of Veterinary Science and Animal Husbandry (B.V.Sc & A.H.)
- Four-year Undergraduate (B.Tech) Degree Courses: B.Tech in Dairy Technology
- Undergraduate (Bachelor) Degree Courses: Bachelor of Fishery Sciences (B.F.Sc).
- Two-year Postgraduate Degree Courses: Master of Veterinary Sciences (M.V.Sc), M.Tech in Dairy Technology, Master of Fishery Sciences (M.F.Sc)

This university also offers research-level programs (Ph.D.) in Veterinary Sciences, Dairy Technology, and Fishery Sciences. For all programs in the Veterinary Sciences, the university follows the course curriculum, rules & regulations as prescribed by the Veterinary Council of India (VCI). For all programs in Dairy Technology and Fishery Sciences, the university follows the course curriculum, rules & regulations as prescribed by the Indian Council of Agricultural Research (ICAR).

=== Admission ===
For admission in the B.V.Sc & A.H., and B.F.Sc program, the candidate must have to pass higher secondary (10 +2) examination in science stream from any government recognized board. The selection of the students will be done as per the merit list based on the results of the higher secondary examination. For admission in the B.Tech (Dairy Technology) course, the candidate must have to qualify in West Bengal Joint Entrance Examination for Engineering/ Technology (WBJEE).

For admission in Postgraduate programs like M.V.Sc., M.Tech. and M.F.Sc. courses, the candidates have to secure a minimum of 6.2 Overall Grade Point Average (O.G.P.A.) in their B.V.Sc. & A.H., B.Tech. (D.T.) & B.F.Sc. courses. Besides, they have to take a written examination and personal interviews conducted by the university for final selection. For admission in the Ph.D. program, one has to also take a written examination and personal interviews conducted by the university.

=== Ranking and Accreditation ===
The university is recognized by the University Grant Commission and also accredited by the Indian Council of Agricultural Research. This university holds rank 29 in the ICAR ranking of agricultural universities. Domestically the University ranked 26th among Agriculture and Allied Sectors Institutions by National Institutional Ranking Framework (NIRF) in 2023.

== See also ==
- Karnataka Veterinary, Animal and Fisheries Sciences University
- Kerala Veterinary College, Mannuthy
- Rajiv Gandhi College of Veterinary and Animal Sciences
- List of universities in India
- List of academic institutions formerly affiliated to the University of Calcutta
