= Kurumbapet =

Kurumbapet Couroumbapett
- Town
- Location in Puducherry, India
- Coordinates: 11.92°N 79.75°E
- Country: India
- State: Puducherry
- District: Pondicherry

Population (2001)
  - Total: 7,412

Languages
  - Official: Tamil
  - Additional: English, French
- Time zone: UTC+5:30 (IST)
- Vehicle registration: PY-05

Kurumbapet is a town and a gram panchayat in Pondicherry district in the Indian union territory of Puducherry.

== Demographics ==
As of 2001 India census, Kurumbapet had a population of 7412. Males constitute 51% of the population and females 49%. Kurumbapet has an average literacy rate of 72%, higher than the national average of 59.5%: male literacy is 79%, and female literacy is 64%. In Kurumbapet, 12% of the population is under 6 years of age. There is one Housing Board Colony in Kurumbapet where the major residents are employees of Anglo French Textile situated nearby.

An Association was formed by the residents during 1986–87 and Mariamman temple was built initially. Many industries are came near by, and the city limit is extended up to this village. Kurumbapet come under Oulgaret panchayat board.
