= Koduvalli =

Place in the Thiruvallur district of Tamil Nadu

Coordinates: 13.2070460°N 80.065148°E

Koduvalli is a village in the Thiruvallur district of Tamil Nadu, India.

The College of Food and Dairy Technology is located in Koduvalli.
