= Tamil Nadu Veterinary and Animal Sciences University =

Veterinary university in Chennai, India

- Established: 1989; 37 years ago
- Chancellor: Governor of Tamil Nadu
- Vice-Chancellor: Vacant
- Location: Madhavaram Milk Colony, Chennai, Tamil Nadu, India
- Website: www.tanuvas.ac.in

Tamil Nadu University of Veterinary and Animal Sciences (TANUVAS) is a veterinary university founded in 1989 in Madhavaram Milk Colony, Chennai, India. It is composed of the Madras Veterinary College, Vepery, Veterinary College and Research Institute, Namakkal, Veterinary College and Research Institute, Tirunelveli; Veterinary College and Research Institute, Orathanadu, Thanjavur and the Institute of Food and Dairy Technology, Koduvalli, Chennai-52. Research farms are for leprosy bacteria, for prawn and edible fish culture, and for animal feed safety.

== History ==
The institution now operating as a university was established in 1876 and became a college in 1903, with 20 students at Dobbin Hall, Chennai. The three-year diploma course, Graduate of Madras Veterinary College, was then offered.

The Government of Tamil Nadu established the university on 20 September 1989 through the Tamil Nadu Veterinary and Animal Sciences University Act, 1989 (Tamil Nadu Act 42 of 1989). Tamil Nadu Agricultural University's Faculty of Veterinary and Animal Sciences (i.e., Madras Veterinary College, Veterinary College and Research Institute, Namakkal and Fisheries College and Research Institute, Thoothukudi) formed the nucleus of university and the institutes became constituent colleges of the newly formed university.

== Constituent colleges ==
The university has the following constituent colleges.

No.	College Name	Location	District	Estd
1	Madras Veterinary College	Vepery, Chennai	Chennai district	1903
2	Veterinary College and Research Institute, Namakkal	Laddivadi	Namakkal district	1985
3	Veterinary College and Research Institute, Tirunelveli	Ramayanpatti, Palayamkottai Taluk	Tirunelveli district	2011
4	Veterinary College and Research Institute, Orathanadu, Thanjavur	Orathanadu	Thanjavur district	2011
5	Fisheries College and Research Institute, Thoothukudi	Chidambara Nagar, Thoothukudi	Thoothukudi district	1977
6	College of Food and Dairy Technology, Koduvalli	Koduvalli	Chennai district	1972
7	Post Graduate Research Institute in Animal Sciences, Kattupakkam	Kattupakkam	Tiruvallur district	1972
8	Veterinary College and Research Institute, Salem	Salem	Salem district	2019
9	Veterinary College and Research Institute, Udumalaipettai	Udumalaipettai	Thirupur district	2020
10	Veterinary College and Research Institute, Theni	Theni	Theni district	2020
11	College of Poultry Production and Management, Hosur	Hosur	Krishnagiri district	2021

== Rankings ==
The NIRF (National Institutional Ranking Framework) ranked it 17th among Agriculture institutes in India in 2024.

== See also ==
- List of universities in India
- Universities and colleges in India
- Education in India
- Distance Education Council
- University Grants Commission (India)
- List of Tamil Nadu Government's Educational Institutions
