= Veterinary Council of India =

- Formation: 1984
- Purpose: Regulatory agency
- Headquarters: New Delhi, Delhi, India
- Website: vci.dahd.gov.in

The Veterinary Council of India (VCI) is a statutory body which regulates veterinary practice in India. Established under the Ministry of Agriculture of the Government of India in 1984, and based in New Delhi, the council is governed by the Indian Veterinary Council Act, 1984. The first members were nominated in 1989. The first elections to the council took place in 1999. Since May 2019 after the creation of Ministry of Fisheries, Animal Husbandry and Dairying the Veterinary Council of India is functional as a statutory body under this ministry.

It derives its funding from grants-in-aid from the Department of Animal Husbandry & Dairying of the Ministry of Agriculture.

== Composition ==
The council has twenty-seven members (fourteen nominated, eleven elected and two ex officio).

More precisely, according to the council's website, it consists of:

- Five Members to be nominated by the Central Government from amongst the Directors of Animal Husbandry (by whatever name called) of those States to which the Act extends,
- Four Members to be nominated by the Central Government from amongst the heads of Veterinary Institutions in the States to which the Act extends.
- One Member to be nominated by the Indian Council of Agricultural Research.
- Animal Husbandry Commissioner, Government of India, ex officio;
- One Member to be nominated by the Central Government to represent the Ministry of the Central Government dealing with Animal Husbandry;
- One Member to be nominated by the Indian Veterinary Association;
- Eleven members are elected from amongst the persons enrolled in the Indian Veterinary Practitioners Register;
- One Member to be nominated by the Central Government from amongst the Presidents of the State Veterinary Councils of those States to which the Act extends;
- One Member to be nominated by the Central Government from amongst the Presidents of the State Veterinary Associations of those States to which the Act extends;

Secretary, Veterinary Council of India, ex officio.

== Objectives ==
The Veterinary Council's website names the following objectives:

- To prepare and maintain the Indian Veterinary Practitioners' Register containing the names of all persons who possess the recognized veterinary qualifications and who are for the time being enrolled on a State Veterinary Register of the State to which Indian Veterinary Council Act extends.
- To lay down minimum standards of veterinary education required for granting recognized veterinary qualifications by veterinary institutions.
- To recommend recognition or withdrawal of recognition of veterinary qualifications granted by veterinary institutions in India.
- To lay down the standards of professional conduct, etiquette and code of ethics to be observed by veterinary practitioners
- To negotiate with institutions located in other countries imparting training in veterinary education for recognition of their qualifications on reciprocal basis.
- To regulate veterinary practice in the country.
- To advise the Central and the State Governments on all regulatory matters concerning veterinary practice and education.
- To frame regulations
- To implement the provisions of the Act, and Rules and Regulations framed thereunder.

== Veterinary Council of India (Registration) Regulations ==
These regulations came into force on 24 February 1994.

Definition

In these regulations, unless the context otherwise requires:-

- 'Act' means the Indian Veterinary Council Act, 1984(52 of 1984).
- 'Form' means a form appended to these regulations.
- 'Recognised Veterinary College' means a veterinary college affiliated to a university and recognised by Veterinary Council of India.

Register

The Register shall be maintained in such form specified in the Appendix annexed to these regulations.

Direct Registration in the Register

Any registered practitioner desirous of having his/her name entered in the Register under Section 24 of the Act may apply directly to Secretary in form A. The Secretary shall verify the antecedents of the applicant and verify that the applicant has a recognised veterinary qualification.

Registration of Additional Qualification

Any registered practitioner may apply to the Secretary on an application in Form B on obtaining any degree or diploma in veterinary science in addition to his/her registered qualification.

Alteration of names in the Register

Application for alteration of name in the register is not entertained unless accompanied by following:-

- Notification in the official Gazette relating to such alteration.
- A Notification in the official Gazette relating to change in name an affidavit regarding such alteration of name affirmed and authenticated before a Judicial Magistrate of the First Class or Metropolitan Magistrate in original, along with two attested copies thereof.

Notification about change of place or residence

It shall be the duty of every registered practitioner to intimate his or her changed address to the Veterinary Council or the State Veterinary Council concerned.

Certificate of Registration

The certificate of Registration is given in Form 'C'.

Renewal, revision and publication of register

After every five years from the first publication of the register in the Official Gazette, the Secretary shall cause a general notice in Form 'D' to be published in the leading newspapers having wide circulation in the country and on such dates as the Secretary may, with the approval of the President of the Veterinary Council of India, decide, call upon all registered practitioners to apply to the Secretary without payment of any fee and within the specified period, for continuation of their names in the Register.

Issue of Duplicate Certificate

Issue of Duplicate certificate can be applied to Secretary in Form 'G' only if the original certificate of the registered practitioner has been lost or destroyed by paying a fee of Rs. 10/-

=== Appeal ===
Any aggrieved by an order under sub-section (1) of Section 49 of the Act may appeal within 60 days to the Council in Form H.

== See also ==
- Indian Veterinary Research Institute (IVRI)
