= Higher National Veterinary School =

Public university in Algeria

Coordinates: 36.7178°N 3.1526°E

- École nationale supérieure vétérinaire المدرسة الوطنية العليا للبيطري
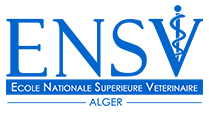
- Type: Public
- Established: 1970
- Chancellor: Rezlan El-ouardi
- Administrative staff: 02 Professors, 10 holding teacher-researchers, 54 lecturer, 1 Assistant, 1 secondary studies Professor.
- Location: Algiers, Algeria

The Higher National Veterinary School (French: École nationale supérieure vétérinaire, ENSV, Arabic:المدرسة الوطنية العليا للطب البيطري), is a public institution of higher learning founded in Algeria in 1970, by Presidential Decree No. 65-69 of March 11, 1965. It is located in Hacène Badi - El Harrach 12 km east of Algiers.
