= Karnataka Veterinary, Animal and Fisheries Sciences University =

State University in Karnataka

- Type: Public
- Established: 10 February 2004; 22 years ago
- Chancellor: Governor of Karnataka
- Vice-Chancellor: Dr. K. C. Veeranna
- Location: Bidar, Karnataka, India; 17°52′8.75″N 77°28′43.85″E
- Website: kvafsu.edu.in

Karnataka Veterinary, Animal and Fisheries Sciences University abbreviated as KVAFSU is a public university, established by an Act of Karnataka Legislative Assembly which was passed on 10 February 2004. This university has its headquarters in the Bidar district of Karnataka state, India.

As the name says this university was created for the education and control of veterinary, animal and fisheries science education in the state of Karnataka.

As many as 21 allied institutions including colleges, research institutions, veterinary hospitals among others and the employees are transferred to the new university. These include Veterinary College, Bangalore; College of Veterinary Science & Animal Husbandry (Shimoga and Hassan) and Veterinary College, Bidar; Veterinary College Hospital, Hebbal; Dairy Science College, Bangalore; Rural Veterinary Hospital at Yelahanka; District Veterinary Hospital, Bidar of Animal Husbandry and Veterinary Services Department.

Institutions relating to fisheries which are transferred under the new university include College of Fisheries at Mangalore; Fisheries Research Station, Hesaraghatta; Fisheries Research Station, Ankola; Fish Seed Production farms at Munirabad and Shivapura, in Koppal district.

Other institutions under the university are the Institute of Animal Health and Veterinary Biologicals, Bangalore; livestock farm at Hesaraghatta; Livestock Breeding and Training Centre, Kurikuppe, Bellary; Devani Cattle Breeding Station, Hallikhed, Bidar; Killar Breeding Station, Arabhavi; Sheep Breeding, Bandoor, Malavalli; Main Research Station, Hebbal; Agriculture Research Station (ARS) at Mangalore and Nagamangala and Zonal ARS at Konnehally, Tiptur.

On 25 March 2025, the University organised the 14th convocation.

== Undergraduate degree programmes ==
The university offers the following undergraduate degree programmes under a semester system in its seven constituent colleges on six campuses.

- Bachelor of Veterinary Science & Animal Husbandry (B.V.Sc.&A.H)
- Bachelor of Technology (Dairy Technology) (B.Tech (D.Tech))
- Bachelor of Fisheries Science
- Diploma in Animal Science

== Constituent colleges ==
- Bengaluru Veterinary college, Hebbal, Bengaluru
- Bidar Veterinary College, Bidar
- Institute for Animal Health & Veterinary Biological, Bangalore
- Livestock Research and Information Centre (Deoni), Bidar
- Hassan Veterinary College, Hassan
- Shivamogga Veterinary College, Shivamogga
- Marine Fisheries Research And Information Centre (MFRIC), Ankola, Uttar Kannada
- Fisheries College, Mangaluru
- Fisheries Research and Information Center (Inland) Hebbal, Bangalore
- Fisheries Research and Information Centre (Inland), Hesaraghatta, Bangalore
- Livestock Research and Information Centre, Nagamangala
- Livestock Research and Information Centre, Amrut Mahal
- Shri Bhaurao Deshpande Veterinary College, Athani

== Awards ==
In December 2024, the Livestock Research and Information Centre, an extension unit of University bagged the National Breed Conservation Award 2024.
