= University of León =

University in Spain

Coordinates: 42°36′43.64″N 5°33′36.79″W

- Universidad de León
- Other name: ULE
- Motto: Universitas Legionensis
- Motto in English: University of León
- Type: Public university
- Established: 1979
- Academic affiliations: EURECA-PRO (European University for Responsible Consumption and Production)
- Budget: €114,665,956
- Rector: Nuria González Álvarez
- Faculty: 1,287
- Administrative staff: 714
- Students: 12,643
- Undergraduates: 8,739
- Postgraduates: 488
- Doctoral students: 1,172
- Location: León and Ponferrada, Castile and León, Spain
- Campus: Urban (León) & Rural (Ponferrada)
- Colors: Red & Green
- Website: unileon.es

The University of León (ULE) is a public university based in the city of León (Spain), with an additional campus in Ponferrada.

The origins of the university can be traced back to 1843, with the creation of the Normal School of Teachers or Teacher Training Seminary of Public Instruction, and the subordinate Veterinary School, founded in 1852, laying the foundations for the future University of León. It was officially founded in 1979 as a split from the University of Oviedo, incorporating various schools and faculties that had previously been dependent on it and had existed in León for varying lengths of time.

In recent years, the university has signed important collaboration agreements, including one with the University of Washington, establishing its second European campus in León, and another with the University of Xiangtan, which led to the creation of the Confucius Institute in the city.

The university offers 39 Bachelor's degrees and 5 dual degree pathways, 31 official Master's programs, 5 inter-university Master's programs, and 2 international Master's programs, along with 17 doctoral programs, completing the range of official degrees offered by the University of León. In recent years, it has stood out for its progress in the field of internationalization, as evidenced by the percentage of foreign students enrolled in its programs, the growing number of students participating in mobility programs, and its integration into the European University for Responsible Consumption and Production (EURECA-PRO).

== History ==
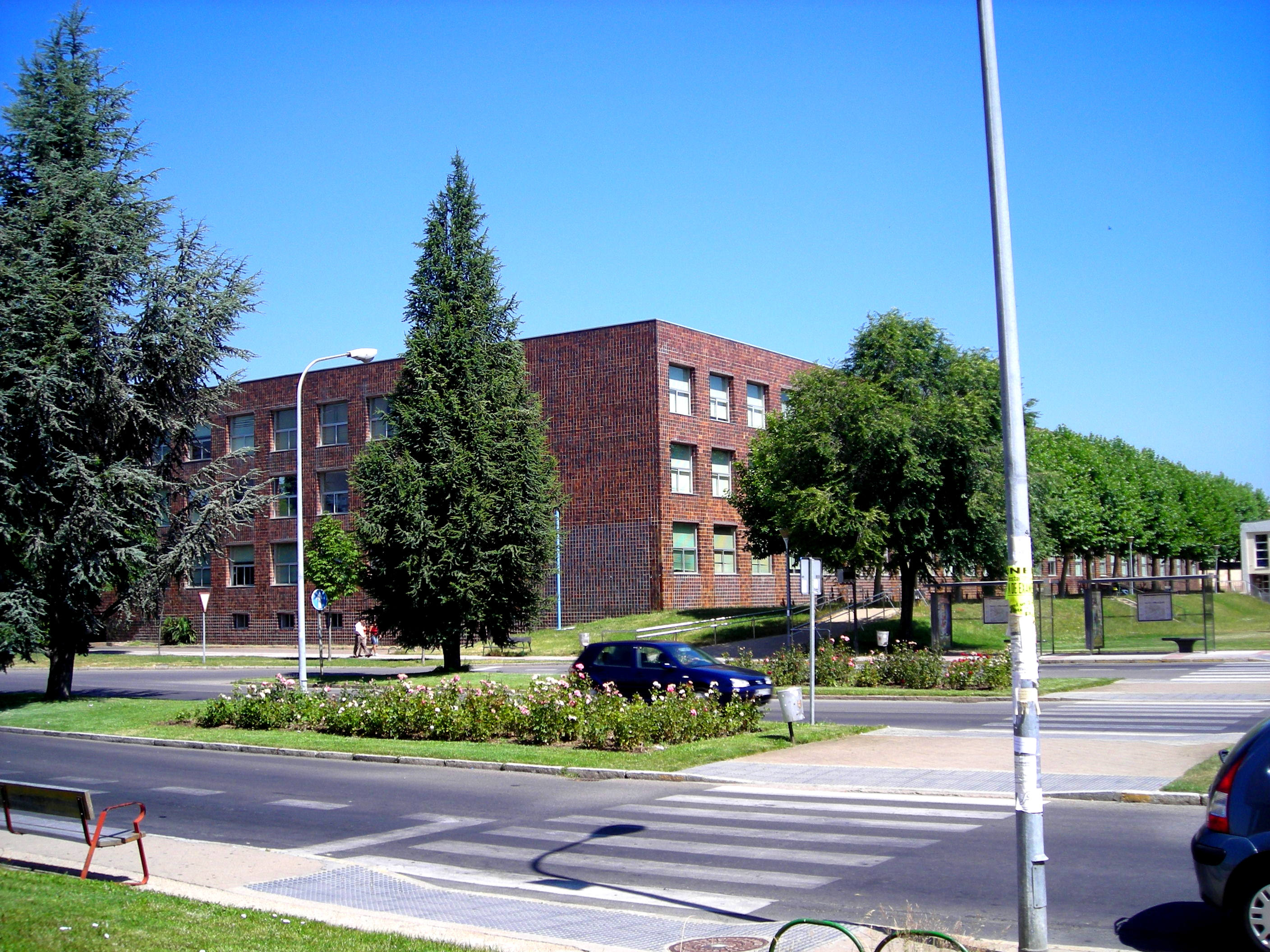
Faculty of Philosophy and Arts

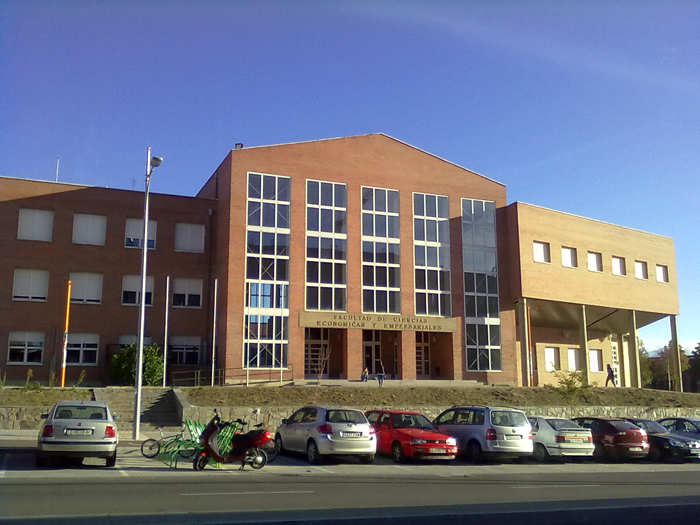
Faculty of Economics and Business

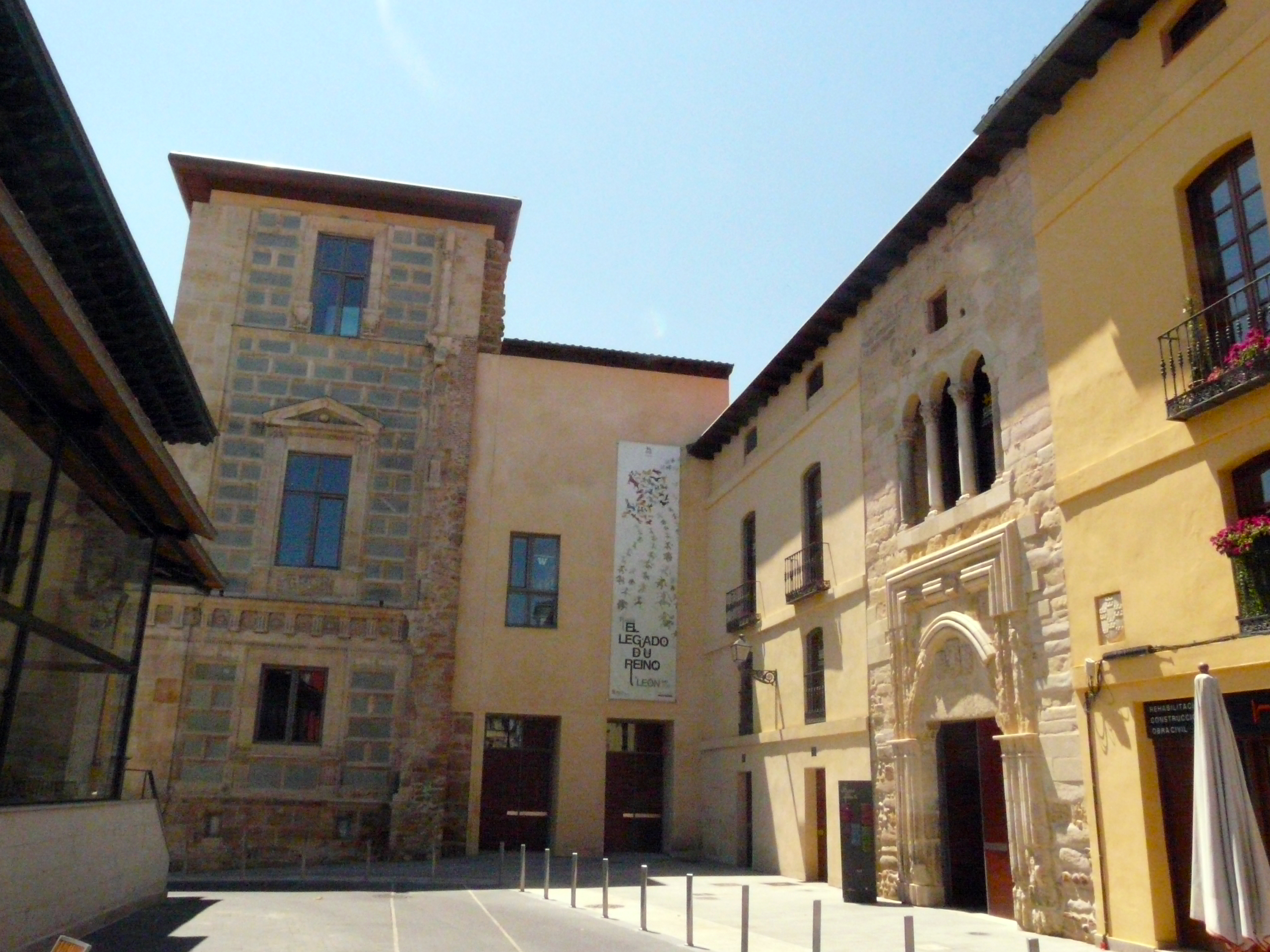
The University of Washington has its headquarters at the Palace of the Count Luna.

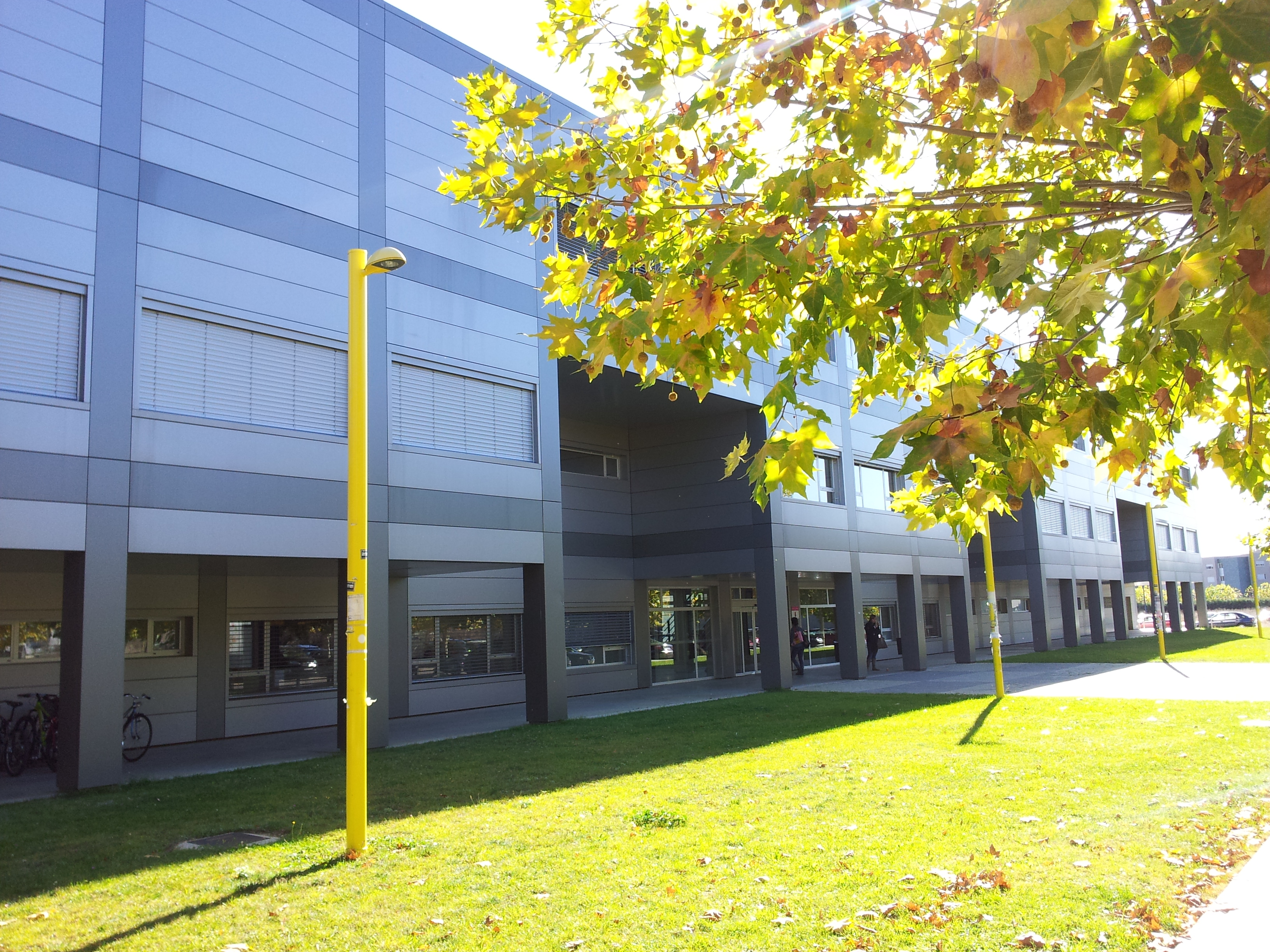
Headquarters of the Caléndula supercomputer, located in the CRAI-TIC Building of the university.

19th Century

The origins of the University of León date back to 1843, with the creation of the Normal School of Teachers or Teacher Training Seminary of Public Instruction, which later became the Faculty of Education. In 1852, the Subordinate Veterinary School was established, which eventually became the Faculty of Veterinary Medicine, the university's most renowned and prestigious faculty. No new educational centers were created during the rest of the 19th century, and the next developments came with the turn of the century.

20th Century

In 1914, the Elementary School of Commerce was founded following repeated efforts by the leaders of the León Chamber of Commerce and Industry. In 1943, the Subordinate Veterinary School became the Faculty of Veterinary Medicine, which, in turn, established the Biological Sciences section in 1961, although its activities did not commence until 1968.

The Faculty of Veterinary Medicine was the true cornerstone of the University of León. In addition to housing the Biological Sciences section, it hosted the Law program, the San Raimundo de Peñafort Academy, and the SEU (Student Union), all affiliated with the University of Oviedo. Furthermore, the Faculty of Veterinary Medicine also accommodated the School of Mine Overseers and Metallurgical Factories, founded in 1943, which later became the Higher Technical School of Mining Engineering. Similarly, the School of Agricultural Overseers, established in 1963, became the origin of the Higher Technical School of Agricultural and Forestry Engineering.

The establishment of the university

The path to establishing the university required surpassing the legal requirement of three faculties needed to be recognized as a university. In 1970, the General Education Law, which allowed the incorporation of existing university schools, spurred the León community to begin the process of creating the University of León.

In 1972, the León University College was founded, sponsored by Caja León, now known as Caja España. Initially, it offered programs in Philosophy and Arts and later expanded to include Law. The Biological Sciences section became a faculty in 1975.

The transformation was completed in 1979, during the democratic era, with the publication of Law 29/1979, which officially established the University of León. The new university catalog included technical industrial engineering schools, nursing schools (then managed by the León Provincial Council), the teacher training school in Ponferrada (sponsored by the Catholic Church), and the school of social work.

21st Century

Today, the University of León has two campuses: one in León, located on Vegazana grounds, which once belonged to the Diocese of León and were later purchased by Caja León (now Caja España) and donated for the creation of the León University College, and another in Ponferrada, situated around the old "Camino de Santiago" hospital and inaugurated in 1996. Together, the university offers 39 undergraduate degrees, 38 Master's programs, and 17 doctoral programs, along with 11 proprietary degrees, forming the educational offerings across its two campuses.

In recent years, the university has signed significant collaboration agreements, including one with the University of Washington, leading to the establishment of the University of Washington León Center, its second European campus, and another with the Xiangtan University, which facilitated the creation of the Confucius Institute of the University of León. Both universities have their own facilities in the city: the first at the Palace of the Count Luna and the second at Calle Jesús Rubio, 2, near the Language Center of the University of León.

== Faculties and Schools ==
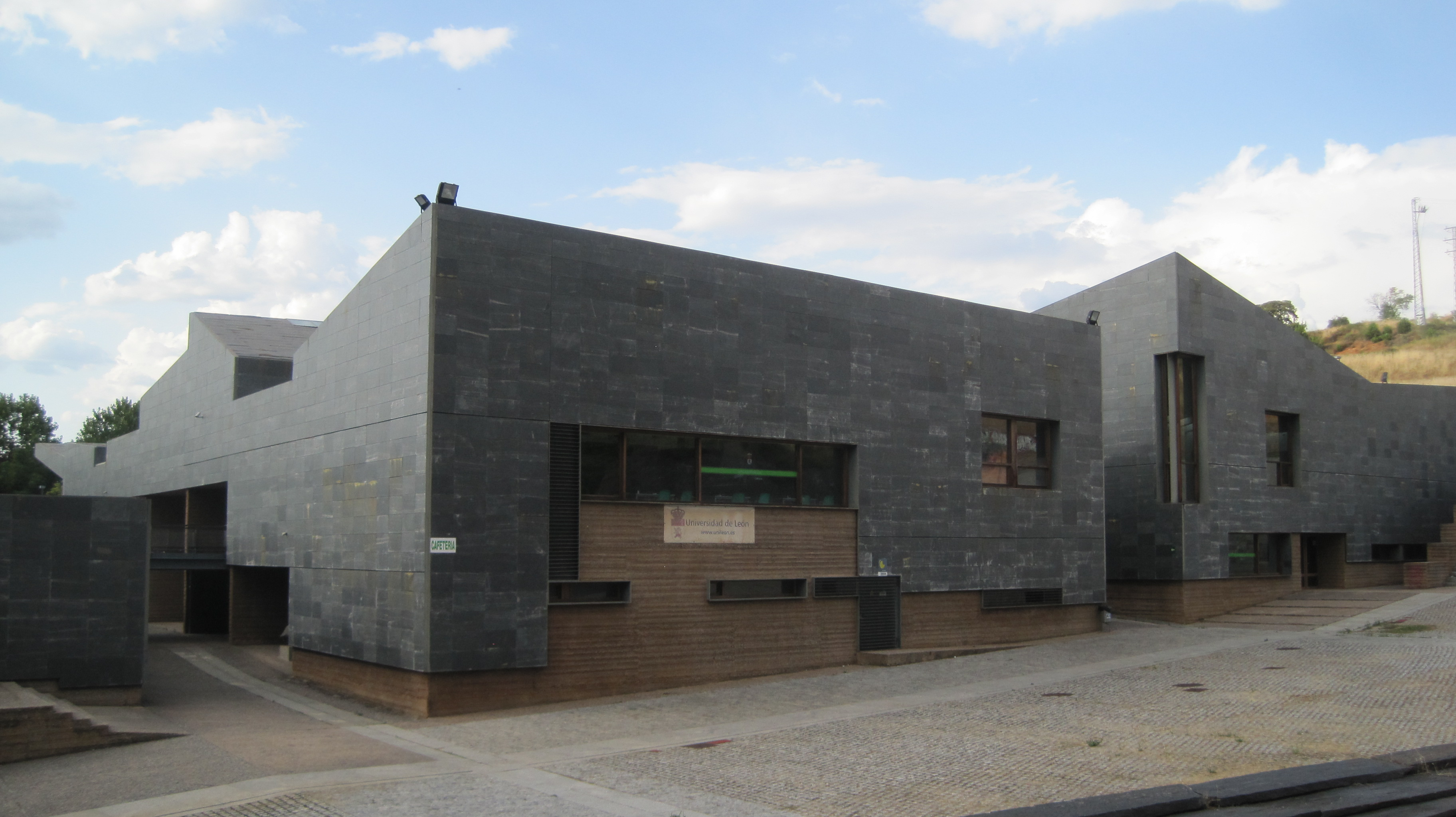
Library of the University of León campus in Ponferrada (León, Spain).

The University of León consists of nine faculties (Veterinary Medicine, Biological and Environmental Sciences, Education, Law, Philosophy and Arts, Economics and Business, Labor Sciences, Health Sciences, and Physical Activity and Sports Sciences), three engineering schools (Industrial, Informatics and Aerospace; Mining; and Agricultural and Forestry Engineering), a Doctoral School, and one affiliated university school (Social Work), distributed between the Vegazana and Ponferrada campuses. Additionally, the university's offerings include a language center, an ICT Center, which hosts the Caléndula supercomputer and provides internship opportunities with HP.

The university is also associated with the Veterinary Clinical Hospital of Castile and León, where Veterinary Medicine students complete their internships. The hospital serves areas including Asturias, Cantabria, the Basque Country, and Castile and León, covering a total of 9.5 million livestock heads.

Rectorate

Located in the center of the city of León, the Rectorate occupies the old building that, for decades, housed the Faculty of Veterinary Medicine, the true origin of the University. After the faculty moved from the avenue now named after it (Avenida de la Facultad de Veterinaria) to the Vegazana Campus, the building was completely renovated and adapted to its new purpose. Today, it accommodates the Government Pavilion, including the Rectorate and administrative services, as well as the University's guesthouse. Additionally, several classrooms, halls, and auditoriums have been prepared to host the most solemn institutional events.

The renovated building was inaugurated during a formal academic ceremony attended by nine rectors and regional, provincial, and local authorities on December 18, 1989.

Student House

The Student House occupies a significant portion of the former Faculty of Veterinary Medicine building, located in the city center, where the Government Pavilion is also situated. Students have access to cultural and recreational facilities within this building, including numerous study rooms with extended opening hours until midnight during exam periods. It also hosts the Ateneo Cultural, which includes the El Albéitar theater, exhibition halls, conference rooms, and workshops.

Recently, a small building known as the 25th Anniversary Building was constructed in the access courtyard. It houses administrative offices and the University store.

== See also ==
- Spanish universities
