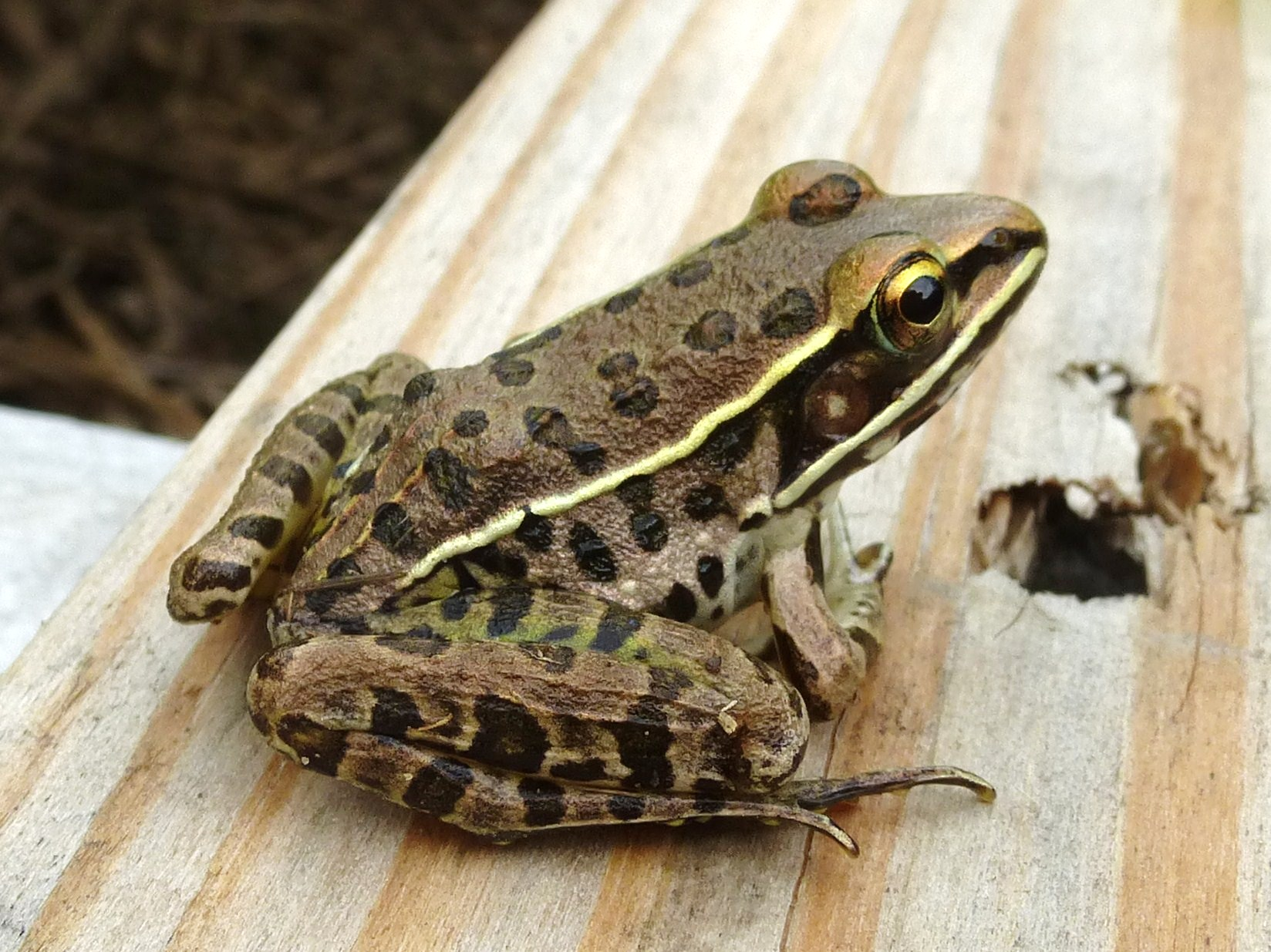
- Southern leopard frog (Lithobates sphenocephalus)

Scientific classification
- Kingdom: Animalia
- Phylum: Chordata
- Class: Amphibia
- Order: Anura
- Family: Ranidae
- Genus: Lithobates

Species
- See text

= Leopard frog =

Common name of several species of amphibian

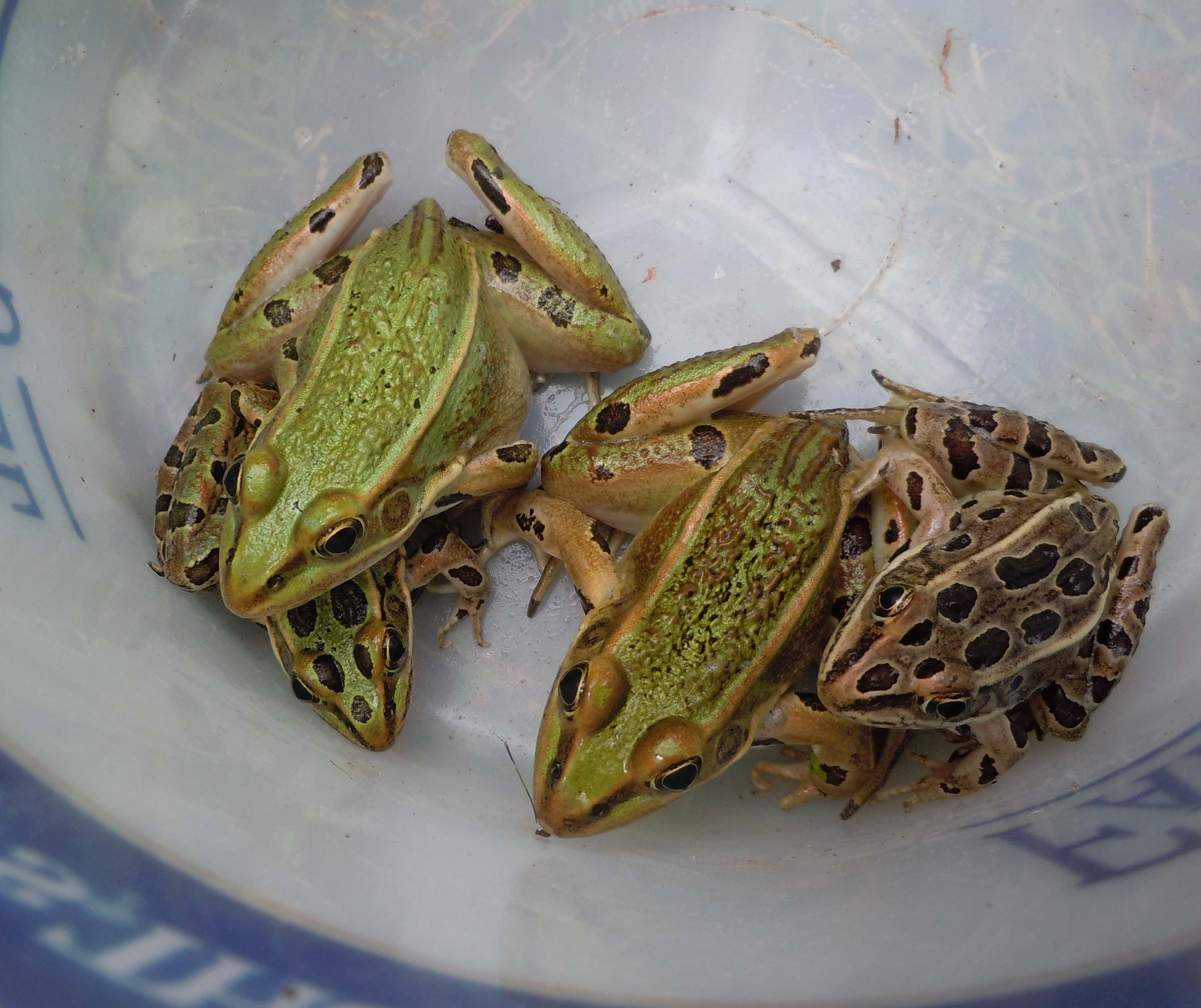
Leopard frogs, such as these northern leopard frogs (Lithobates pipiens), can have varying coloration and patterning between individuals

Leopard frog is a generic name used to refer to various species in the true frog genus Lithobates. They all have similar coloration: brown or green with spots that form a leopard pattern. They are distinguished by their distribution and behavioral, morphological, and genetic differences. The range of the various species of leopard frogs extends from the Hudson Bay in Canada, throughout the United States, throughout Mexico and other parts of Central America, and possibly the very northern section of South America.

== Taxonomy ==
Leopard frogs are grouped in the genus Lithobates, along with many other different frogs such as the American bullfrog.

=== Species ===
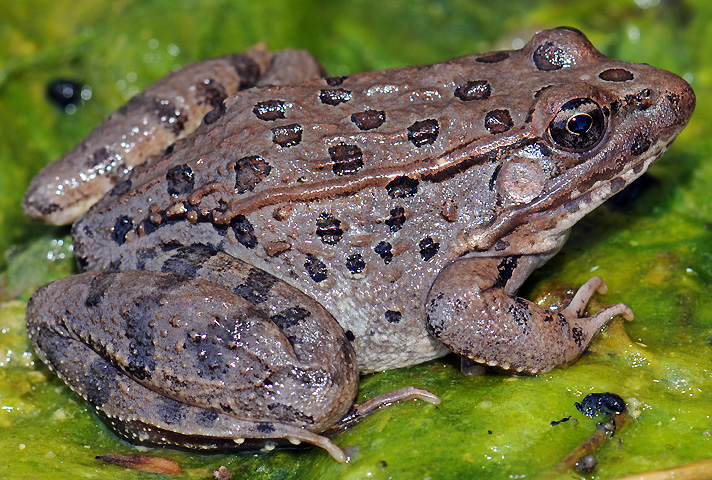
Lowland leopard frog (Lithobates yavapaiensis)

- Atlantic Coast leopard frog (Lithobates kauffeldi)
- Bigfoot leopard frog (Lithobates megapoda)
- Browns' leopard frog (Lithobates brownorum)
- Chiricahua leopard frog (Lithobates chiricahuensis)
- Forrer's grass frog (Lithobates forreri)
- Guerreran leopard frog (Lithobates omiltemanus)
- Island leopard frog (Lithobates miadis)
- Lemos-Espinal's leopard frog (Lithobates lemosespinali)
- Lenca leopard frog (Lithobates lenca)
- Lowland leopard frog (Lithobates yavapaiensis)
- Montezuma leopard frog (Lithobates montezumae)
- Northern leopard frog (Lithobates pipiens)
- Northwest Mexico leopard frog (Lithobates magnaocularis)
- Peralta frog (Lithobates taylori)
- Pickerel frog (Lithobates palustris)
- Plains leopard frog (Lithobates blairi)
- Relict leopard frog (Lithobates onca)
- Rio Grande leopard frog (Lithobates berlandieri)
- Showy leopard frog (Lithobates spectabilis)
- Southern leopard frog (Lithobates sphenocephalus)
- Tlaloc's leopard frog (Lithobates tlaloci)
- Transverse volcanic leopard frog (Lithobates neovolcanicus)
- Vegas Valley leopard frog (Lithobates fisheri)

== New species ==
Several leopard frog species look very similar to each other, and even within a population there is a lot of variation. Some populations may actually be cryptic species complexes.

In March 2012, it was announced that DNA testing had confirmed that a new species of leopard frog had been found whose habitat was centered near New York's Yankee Stadium and included northern New Jersey, southeastern New York, and Staten Island; the new species was first distinguished by its short, repetitive croak, distinct from the "long snore" or "rapid chuckle" of other leopard frog species in that area (L. pipiens and L. sphenocephalus). This distinct species has been identified as far south as southeastern Virginia and northeastern North Carolina. On 30 October 2014, it was announced that the frog found in March 2012 has been described as a new species: the Atlantic Coast leopard frog (Lithobates kauffeldi) that once inhabited Manhattan, New York.
