= Swamp fever =

Swamp fever may refer to:

== Medicine ==
- Equine infectious anemia, a disease
- Leptospirosis, a disease
- Malaria, a disease
- Mumps, a disease

== Video games ==
- Swamp fever, a disease in The Elder Scrolls series of role-playing video games
- Swamp Fever, a campaign in the 2009 video game Left 4 Dead 2
- Swamp Fever, a disease in the 2015 video game Ark: Survival Evolved
