= Phi Zeta =

Honor society of veterinary medicine in the US

- ΦΖ
- Founded: 1925; 101 years ago Cornell University
- Type: Honor
- Affiliation: Independent
- Status: Active
- Emphasis: Veterinary
- Scope: National
- Colors: Blue and Yellow
- Chapters: 32
- Headquarters: c/o Missy Josephson; 109 Greene Hall; Auburn University; Auburn, Alabama 36849; United States
- Website: www.societyofphizeta.org

Phi Zeta (ΦΖ) is the only honor society of veterinary medicine in the United States.

== History ==
Phi Zeta was established at Cornell University in 1925 with the assistance of Dr. Veranus Alva Moore Phi Zeta is an honor society for veterinary medicine. Its purpose is to promote, acknowledge, and reward scholarship in the profession of veterinary medicine.

== Symbols ==
Greek scholar, George P. Bristol of Cornell University, suggested that the organization use the Greek word, spelled in its Latin form: PHILOZOI; meaning “love for animals”.

The emblem was designed by the artist and naturalist Louis Agassiz Fuertes.

The society's colors are blue and gold.

== Membership ==
Third-year students ranking in the top 10% of the class and fourth-year students ranking in the top 25% of the class are invited to become members.

Honorary membership may also be bestowed upon interns, residents, faculty, and non-veterinary field related persons, who have made significant contributions to veterinary medicine.

== Chapters ==
Chapters have been placed at all 32 accredited veterinary schools in the United States. Active chapters are noted in bold. Inactive chapters are in italics.

Chapter	Charter date and range	Institution	Location	Status	Ref.
Alpha	1925	New York State College of Veterinary Medicine at Cornell University	Ithaca, New York	Active	
Beta	1929	University of Pennsylvania School of Veterinary Medicine	Philadelphia and New Bolton Center, Pennsylvania	Active	
Gamma	1931	Iowa State University College of Veterinary Medicine	Ames, Iowa	Active	
Delta	1934	Ohio State University	Columbus, Ohio	Active	
Epsilon	1948	Auburn University	Auburn, Alabama	Active	
Zeta	1950	Michigan State University College of Veterinary Medicine	East Lansing, Michigan	Active	
Eta	1950	Texas A&M University School of Veterinary Medicine & Biomedical Sciences	College Station, Texas	Active	
Theta	1950	Colorado State University	Fort Collins, Colorado	Active	
Iota	1952	Washington State University College of Veterinary Medicine	Pullman, Washington	Active	
Kappa	1952	University of Minnesota	Saint Paul, Minnesota	Active	
Lambda	1953	UC Davis School of Veterinary Medicine	Davis, California	Active	
Mu	1953	University of Illinois College of Veterinary Medicine	Urbana, Illinois	Active	
Nu	1958	Oklahoma State University–Stillwater	Stillwater, Oklahoma	Active	
Xi	1959	University of Georgia College of Veterinary Medicine	Athens, Georgia	Active	
Omicron	1962	Purdue University	West Lafayette, Indiana	Active	
Pi	1965	University of Missouri College of Veterinary Medicine	Columbia, Missouri	Active	
Rho	1967	Tuskegee University	Tuskegee, Alabama	Active	
Sigma	1969	Kansas State University College of Veterinary Medicine	Manhattan, Kansas	Active	
Tau	1977	Louisiana State University	Baton Rouge, Louisiana	Active	
Upsilon	1979	University of Florida College of Veterinary Medicine	Gainesville, Florida	Active	
Phi	1979	University of Tennessee	Knoxville, Tennessee	Active	
Chi	1984	Virginia–Maryland College of Veterinary Medicine	Blacksburg, Virginia	Active	
Psi	1984	North Carolina State University College of Veterinary Medicine	Raleigh, North Carolina	Active	
Alpha Alpha	1987	University of Wisconsin–Madison	Madison, Wisconsin	Active	
Alpha Gamma	1987	Oregon State University	Corvallis, Oregon	Active	
Omega	1988	Mississippi State University	Starkville, Mississippi	Active	
Alpha Beta	1991	Cummings School of Veterinary Medicine	Grafton, Massachusetts	Active	
Alpha Delta	2006	St. George's University	Saint George Parish, Grenada, West Indies	Active	
Alpha Epsilon	2006	Western University College of Veterinary Medicine	Pomona, California	Active	
Alpha Zeta	2014	Ross University School of Veterinary Medicine	Basseterre, Saint Kitts and Nevis, West Indies	Active	
Alpha Eta	2017	Midwestern University	Glendale, Arizona	Active	
Alpha Theta	2018	Lincoln Memorial University	Harrogate, Tennessee	Active	

== Notable members ==
- Wondwossen Gebreyes, veterinary physician
- Gary Tabor, environmentalist

== See also ==
- Professional fraternities and sororities

== See also ==
- Official website
