= New York State College of Veterinary Medicine at Cornell University =

Veterinary college in New York State

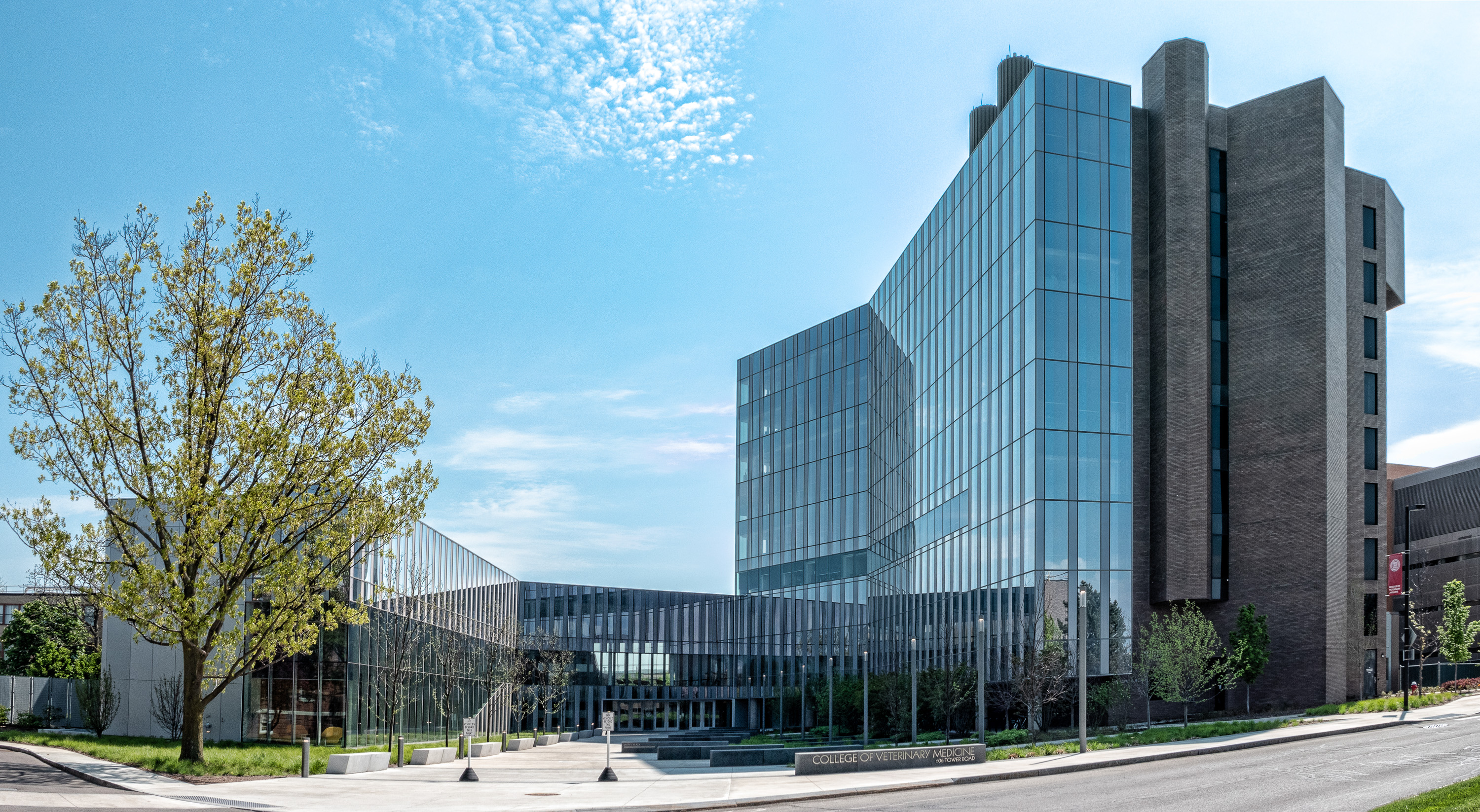
- Lefty's Plaza at the College of Veterinary Medicine at Cornell University
- Type: Statutory college Veterinary school; Graduate and Professional School only
- Established: 1894; 132 years ago
- Affiliations: Cornell University; State University of New York
- Dean: Lorin Warnick
- Faculty: 284
- Postgraduates: 496
- Location: Ithaca, New York, U.S. 42.4475°N 76.4649°W
- Website: vet.cornell.edu

The New York State College of Veterinary Medicine at Cornell University is a statutory college of veterinary medicine at Cornell University, in Ithaca, New York. Founded in 1894, it is the first statutory college of the State University of New York (SUNY) system.

== History ==
- 1868: Cornell becomes the first American university to include a professor of veterinary medicine
- 1876: Cornell awards Daniel Elmer Salmon the first D.V.M. degree ever given in the United States
- 1894: The College of Veterinary Medicine is established by an act of the New York state Legislature
- 1896: The college officially opens
- 1910: Florence Kimball becomes the first woman in the United States to receive her doctorate in veterinary medicine. Seven of the first 11 women to become licensed veterinarians in the United States were Cornell graduates.
- 1912: Kirksey L. Curd became Cornell's first Black doctor of veterinary medicine graduate.
- 1942: Patricia O'Connor Halloran, class of 1939, becomes the first female zoo veterinarian, working at the Staten Island Zoo
- 1970: The Coggins test, a blood test to identify if a horse is a carrier of equine infectious anemia, a viral disease found in horses, is developed by Dr. Leroy Coggins and colleagues.
- Early 1980s: The James A. Baker Institute for Animal Health develops the modified live-virus vaccine for canine parvovirus type 2, still in use today.
- 2005: Cornell launches one of the first comprehensive shelter medicine programs in the country, supported by Maddie's Fund, called Maddie's Shelter Medicine Program at Cornell University.
- 2006: A Cornell horse named Twilight serves as genome donor for the international Equine Whole Genome Sequencing Project.
- 2015: Research at the James A. Baker Institute for Animal Health leads to the first puppies born by in vitro fertilization.
- 2020: The college established the Cornell COVID-19 Testing Laboratory in collaboration with the Cayuga Health System to provide in-house COVID-19 tests for Cornell staff, students, and faculty, allowing the university to reopen and hold in-person study during this time of the COVID-19 pandemic. In April 2022, it passed 2 million tests.

== Academic programs ==
The College of Veterinary Medicine is an internationally recognized institution of public health, biomedical research, and veterinary medicine education. It is one of 30 veterinary colleges in the country, and one of only three in the Northeastern United States. The core mission of the college is to advance the health and well-being of animals and people through education, research, and public service.

Doctor of veterinary medicine (D.V.M.) program: The D.V.M. program provides student instruction in the biological basis of medicine, training in primary and referral veterinary care in the Cornell University Hospital for Animals, and instructed practice in the Small Animal Community Practice. Direct access to numerous innovative dairy farms in the upstate New York region, as well as the Cornell Dairy Barn, facilitate training in food animal medicine.

Master's degree programs: The college houses a Master of Public Health (M.P.H.) Program and a Master of Professional Studies (M.P.S.) Program. The M.P.H. Program prepares students through training on diverse public health issues at municipal, state, national, and international levels. The M.P.S. Program is designed for working individuals who seek to enhance their careers with specialized professional training in veterinary parasitology.

Ph.D. and research programs: The Cornell University College of Veterinary Medicine's Biomedical and Biological Sciences Program is an interdisciplinary program that trains students in basic, clinical, and translational life sciences research alongside faculty mentors and other research professionals. It has a Ph.D. track and a combined Ph.D. and D.V.M. track.

Other professional training: The Cornell University College of Veterinary Medicine regularly hires postdoctoral associates in its departments, centers, and institutes. The Cornell University Hospital for Animals additionally offers preceptorship training for licensed veterinary technician students, including a wildlife preceptorship.

== Departments and units ==
Deans of New York State College of Veterinary Medicine
James Law	1894–1908
Veranus Alva Moore	1908–1929
Pierre Augustine Fish	1929–1931
William Arthur Hagan	1932–1959
George C. Poppensiek	1959–1974
Edward C. Melby Jr.	1975–1984
Robert D. Phemister	1985–1995
Franklin M. Loew	1995–1997
Donald F. Smith	1997–2007
Michael I. Kotlikoff	2007–2015
Lorin Warnick	2015–present

The college comprises six academic departments, six centers, and four institutes.

=== Departments ===
- Department of Biomedical Sciences
- Department of Clinical Sciences
- Department of Microbiology and Immunology
- Department of Molecular Medicine
- Department of Population Medicine and Diagnostic Sciences
- Department of Public and Ecosystem Health

=== Centers ===
- Center for Veterinary Business and Entrepreneurship
- Cornell Richard P. Riney Canine Health Center
- Cornell Dairy Center of Excellence
- Cornell Feline Health Center
- Cornell K. Lisa Yang Center for Wildlife Health
- Cornell Veterinary Biobank

=== Institutes ===
- The Baker Institute for Animal Health
- Duffield Institute for Animal Behavior
- The Sprecher Institute for Comparative Cancer Research
- Summer Dairy Institute

== Cornell University Hospital for Animals ==
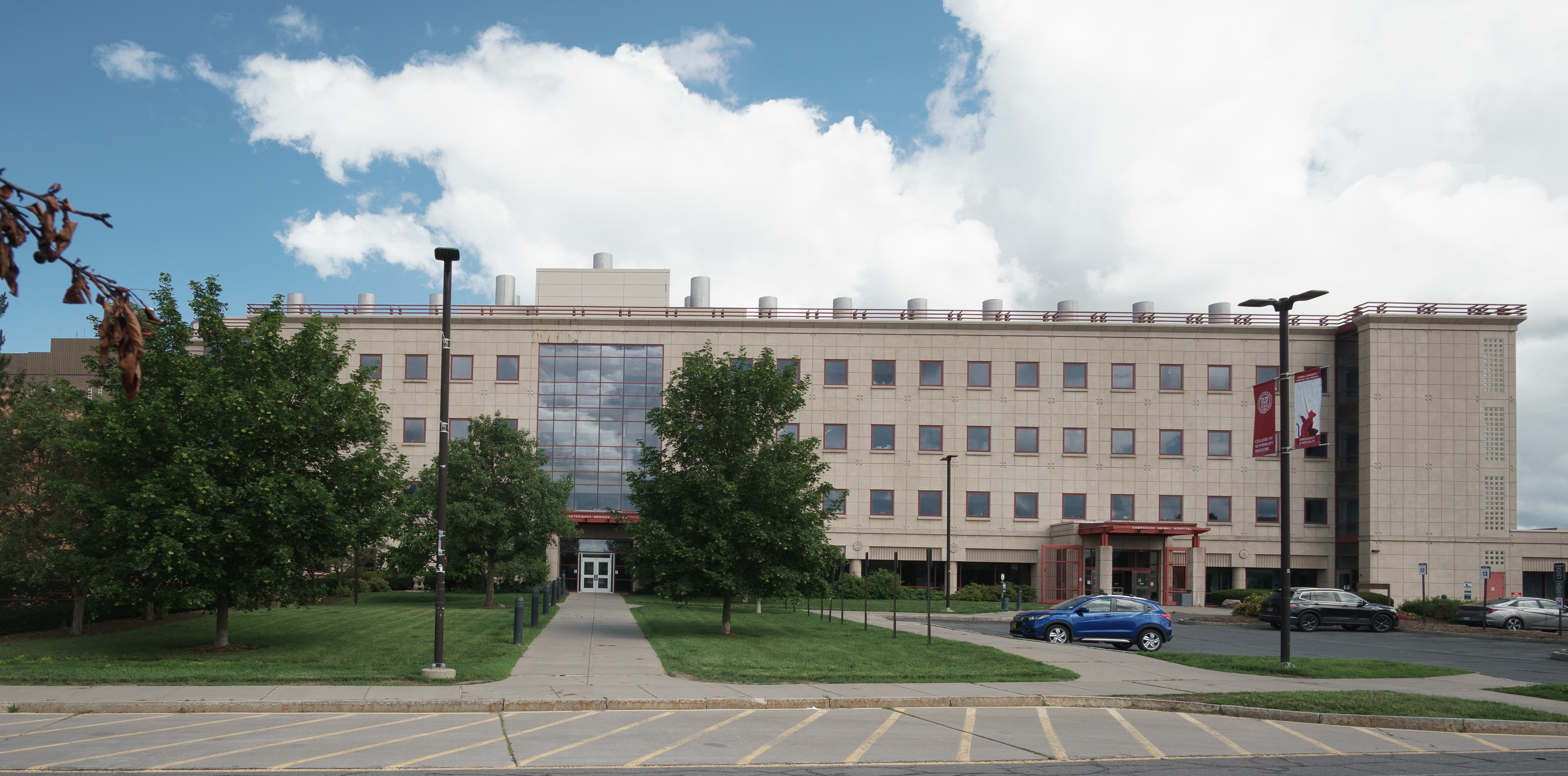
Veterinary Medical Center in Ithaca, New York

College founders taught and practiced veterinary medicine on Cornell's campus as early as 1896 and multiple clinical spaces were built over the years. Currently, the Cornell University Hospital for Animals is a collection of seven hospitals in New York and Connecticut.

- Companion Animal Hospital
- Cornell Equine Hospital
- Cornell Ruffian Equine Specialists
- Cornell University Veterinary Specialists
- Janet L. Swanson Wildlife Hospital
- Nemo Farm Animal Hospital
- Small Animal Community Practice

The current Ithaca space was built in 1996, and houses three of Cornell's animal hospitals: The Companion Animal Hospital, the Cornell Equine Hospital, and the Nemo Farm Animal Hospital. It's also the home of the hospital's Ambulatory Service, which makes on-site visits to dairies and farms throughout the region. The college opened Cornell's Small Animal Community Practice next door in 2018, which enables students to learn business and management skills, and is where Maddie's ® Shelter Medicine Program at Cornell University primarily operates.

Also in Ithaca is the college's Janet L. Swanson Wildlife hospital, located in a nearby facility next to the Baker Institute for Animal Health and the Cornell Feline Health Center. Another clinical space near campus is the Cornell Equine Park, which primarily functions as a learning lab for veterinary students and researchers interested in theriogenology and/or sports medicine and rehabilitation.

In 2011, the college opened its first satellite hospital: Cornell University Veterinary Specialists, located in Stamford, Connecticut. This was followed in 2014 by the second satellite hospital: Cornell Ruffian Equine Specialists in Belmont, New York.

In 2015 and 2016, some controversy at the college surrounded clinician care.

According to the college's most recent annual report, the Cornell University Hospital for Animals saw 30,083 cases in fiscal year 2021. Canine patients were the most common at 20,056 cases, followed by 4,761 feline cases; 1,429 equine cases; 1,319 avian and wildlife cases; 143 bovine cases; 1,659 cases of all other large animals; and 3,072 cases of all other small animals.

== Notable alumni ==
- Clarence C. Combs, Jr., American polo player
- Martin J. Fettman, veterinarian and astronaut
- Mark Gerard, equine veterinarian
- Jean Holzworth, veterinarian and specialist in feline medicine
- Robert C. T. Lee, Taiwanese veterinarian and politician
- Walter Matuszczak, veterinarian and football player
- Adrian R. Morrison, 1991 AAS Scientific Freedom and Responsibility Award recipient
- Patricia O'Connor, veterinarian
- Peter Ostrum, actor
- Martin Sheldon, veterinarian and scientific researcher
- Daniel Elmer Salmon, veterinarian; later identified the infectious pathogen Salmonella
- Ray Van Orman, veterinarian and college football and lacrosse coach
