= St. Peter's Cemetery (Staten Island) =

Cemetery on Staten Island

Coordinates: 40°37′21.42″N 74°6′41.15″W

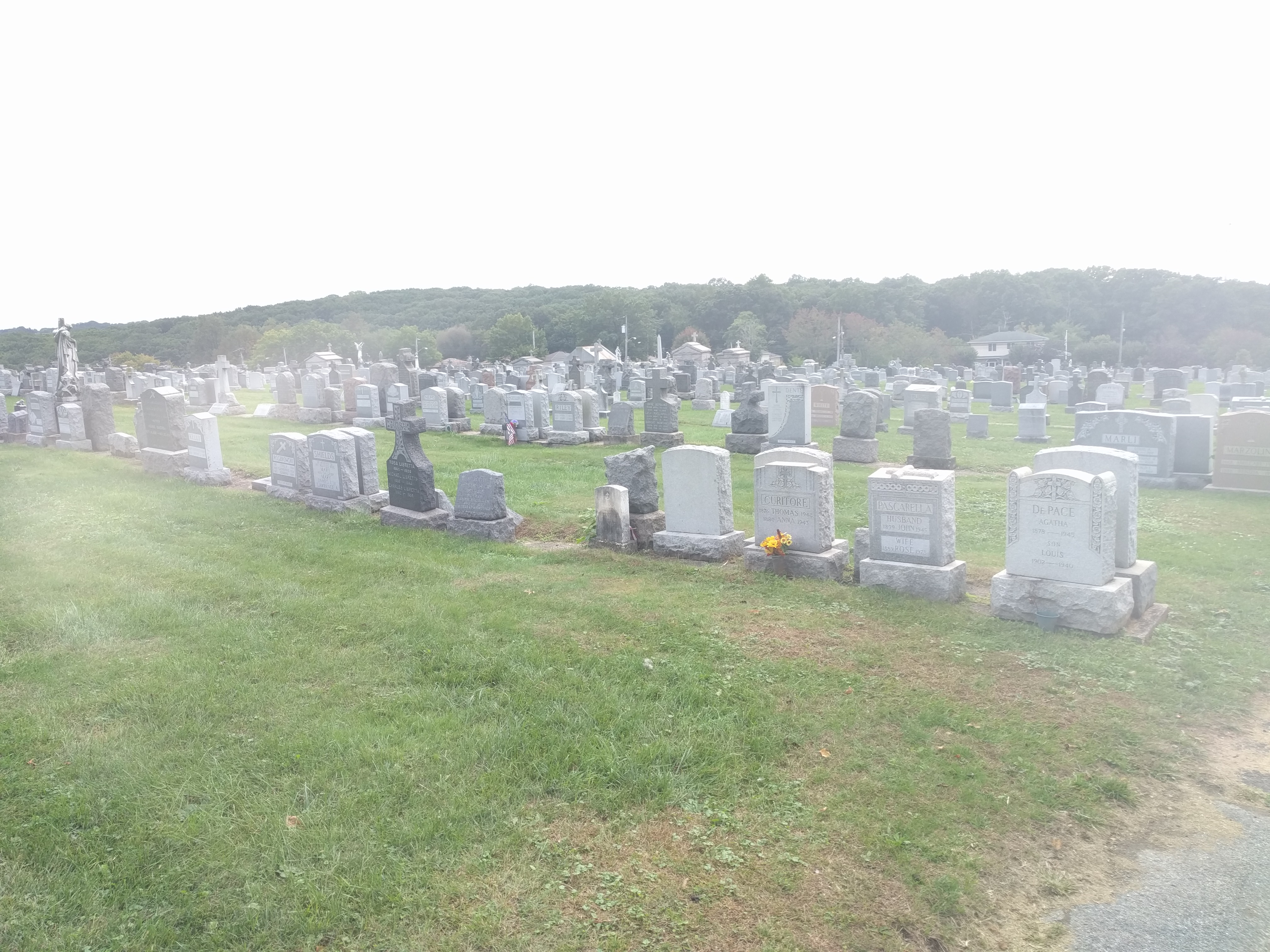

St. Peter's Cemetery is the oldest Roman Catholic cemetery on Staten Island. It is located on the east and west sides of Clove Road, with the east bounded by Bement Avenue and Tyler Avenue in the West New Brighton neighborhood and the west bounded by Martling Lake and Martling Avenue in the Castleton Corners neighborhood.

The address for the cemetery is 52 Tyler Avenue.

== History ==
The cemetery was started in 1848. It is in two sections on both sides of Clove Road. The offices can be accessed from Tyler Avenue or by entry from Bement Avenue at Tyler Avenue. The oldest sections of the cemetery reflect the mostly Irish Catholic community that once comprised the Staten Island Catholic community. St. Peter's cemetery was once a part of St. Peter's Catholic Parish which was the first Catholic church and parish on Staten Island one of the earliest Catholic parishes in New York City, founded in 1839 and originally catering to an Irish community of about 100 people.

Since 1801, a Quarantine Hospital had been located in Tompkinsville, Staten Island, and in the 1840s, during the Great Famine of Ireland, many immigrant Irish who had fallen ill during their voyages were detained here. "During the entire Famine period, about 650,000 Irish arrived in New York harbor. All incoming passenger ships to New York had to stop for medical inspection. Anyone with fever was removed to the quarantine station on Staten Island and the ship itself was quarantined for 30 days." Some Irish also settled in the area, thus increasing the Catholic presence on Staten Island substantially. Some gravestones of Irish immigrants have the Irish County from which they emigrated inscribed.

== Notable burials ==
- Vincent R. Capodanno (1929–1967 †), Roman Catholic priest killed in action serving as a United States Navy chaplain during the Vietnam War, posthumous recipient of the Medal of Honor
- Charles J. McCormack (1865–1915), second borough president of Staten Island
- Joseph F. Merrell (1926–1945 †), posthumous recipient of the Medal of Honor from the 3rd Battalion, 15th Infantry Regiment during World War II
- James Joseph Murphy (1898–1962), World War I veteran and United States representative from New York (1949 to 1953).
- Patricia O'Connor (1914—2003), longtime chief veterinarian at the Staten Island Zoo
- Timothy H. O'Sullivan (c. 1840 – January 14, 1882), an American photographer widely known for his work related to the American Civil War and the Western United States.
- James Wheeler (treasurer) (1843–1914), Richmond County Treasurer (1894–1898). James Wheeler was born in Dublin, Ireland. In 1844 his family and he emigrated to West New Brighton, Staten Island where he would spend the rest of his life. He became one of the largest builders on Staten Island and founded the newspaper The Staten Islander. James Wheeler was an Irish Famine immigrant, the son of Robert and Rose Wheeler and the brother of Patrick, Ann Donnelly, and Mary Cullen, all of whom are also buried near one another in St. Peter's Cemetery. He served as a Trustee of the Village of New Brighton 1878–1879 and was elected County Treasurer in 1894. He was the secretary of the Staten Island Building and Loan Association from 1878 until his death. He was also of the West New Brighton Council and the Royal Arcanum.
