= Patricia O'Connor (veterinarian) =

American veterinarian

Dr. Patricia O'Connor
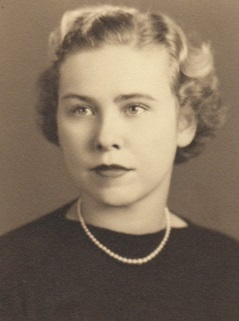
- Born: November 29, 1914; Buffalo, New York
- Died: July 8, 2003 (aged 88); Indiana
- Resting place: St. Peter's Cemetery (Staten Island)
- Education: New York State College of Veterinary Medicine at Cornell University
- Occupation: Zoo Veterinarian
- Years active: 1942-1982
- Known for: Chief animal caretaker at the Staten Island Zoo
- Medical career
- Institutions: Staten Island Zoo

Patricia O’Connor Halloran (November 29, 1914 - July 8, 2003) was an American veterinarian and longtime head caretaker at New York's Staten Island Zoo.

== Early life ==
O'Connor was born in the heart of New York City and grew up in Buffalo, New York with her mother and stepfather. Between 1933 and 1934 she entered the University of Alabama. Then in 1935 she attended the New York State College of Veterinary Medicine at Cornell University, graduating in 1939.

After graduating she moved to Charleston, West Virginia, and worked at a private practice. While there she married her classmate John Lewis Halloran, Jr in 1940. Their wedding took place in Stapleton, Staten Island and was announced in The New York Times society pages. The wedding announcement listed her profession as "physician".

Then they moved to Staten Island, NY and both worked at John's father's vet clinic. Patricia worked in the clinic and did house calls. However, she was never paid by her father-in-law, whereas her husband was.

== Staten Island Zoo ==
Patricia became pregnant with their first child in 1941. She became pregnant again in 1942. That same year in the fall, Patricia was hired by the Barrett Park Zoo (later known as the Staten Island Zoo) to work as a temporary veterinarian, as there were no men available during World War II. After the war ended she remained on staff as their chief animal caretaker for 28 years.

A 1943 article in The New York Times about an Open House at the zoo described O'Connor's work. The reporter suggested that she was "the only woman veterinarian in any zoo in the country." She was responsible for over 600 animals, including a binturong, an ocelot, a spider monkey, and a herring gull.

In 1944 O'Connor was in the news again, for removing an ingrown claw from a nine-year-old African leopard named Tommy. The article noted that Dr. O'Connor weighed 120 lbs; it did not mention the weight of the leopard. In 1949 she told the Times about her experience removing a cancer from a regal python.

== Other accomplishments ==
O'Connor helped found the American Association of Zoo Veterinarians (AAZV), and was its first president from 1946 to 1957.

In 1955 O'Connor published A Bibliography of References to Diseases of Wild Mammals and Birds, a compendium and bibliography on the pathology of wild birds and mammals.

== Later life ==
Upon the death of her husband John Halloran in 1966, she retired from the zoo to run Halloran's small animal clinic. From 1966-1982 she was consultant for an experimental animal colony at the U.S. Public Health Hospital on Staten Island.

In 1999 she retired to Indiana. She died there on July 8, 2003. She is buried with her husband at St. Peter's Cemetery on Staten Island.
