= Wondwossen Gebreyes =

African-American veterinary physician

Wondwossen Abebe Gebreyes
- ወንድወሰን አበበ ገብረየስ
- Born: Addis Ababa University; Ethiopia
- Education: North Carolina State University
- Scientific career
- Workplaces: Ohio State University; North Carolina State University
- Thesis: Molecular epidemiology of multi-drug resistant Salmonella in swine production systems (2001)

Wondwossen Abebe Gebreyes (Ge'ez: ወንድወሰን አበበ ገብረየስ) is an Ethiopian-American veterinary physician; Hazel C. Youngberg Distinguished Professor and executive director of the One Global Health initiative (GOHi) at The Ohio State University. He was elected as a Full Member of the National Academy of Medicine in 2021.

== Early life and education ==
Gebreyes was born in Addis Ababa, Ethiopia. He was an undergraduate student at Addis Ababa University, where he was trained in veterinary medicine and achieved his Doctor of Veterinary Medicine in 1990. He practiced as a field veterinarian in Borena. He moved to the Sidama Region in 1993, where he worked as Head Veterinarian of the Southern Region Veterinary Department. He moved to the United States in 1995, where he moved in with a cousin in Washington, D.C. He eventually moved to North Carolina, where he was appointed research associate in the College of Veterinary Medicine at North Carolina State University. He started a doctoral research program in the Department of Population Health and Pathobiology. His research considered the epidemiology of multi-drug resistant Salmonella. He joined the Sigma Xi and Phi Zeta honor society. He was awarded his diploma from the American College of Veterinary Preventive Medicine in 2002.

== Research and career ==
Gebreyes was appointed to the faculty at North Carolina State University in 2001. He was recruited to the faculty of Ohio State University in 2006 as an associate professor, where he was promoted to professor in 2011. In 2012 Gebreyes was made chair of the One Global Health Initiative at Ohio State. His research considers antimicrobial resistance and food-borne pathogens. He has dedicated his career to global capacity building and international education.

== Awards and honors ==
- 2007 Elected Fellow of the President's Leadership Institute at Ohio State University
- 2009 American Society for Microbiology Minority Professor of the Month
- 2015 Association of Public and Land-grant Universities Michael P. Malone Award
- 2015 Andrew Heiskell Award
- 2016 Universitas 21 Award for Internationalisation
- 2017 North Carolina State University Alumni Award
- 2021 Elected to the National Academy of Medicine

== Selected publications ==
- Wondwossen Abebe Gebreyes; Craig Altier (1 August 2002). "Molecular characterization of multidrug-resistant Salmonella enterica subsp. enterica serovar Typhimurium isolates from swine". Journal of Clinical Microbiology. 40 (8): 2813–2822. doi:10.1128/jcm.40.8.2813-2822.2002. ISSN 0095-1137. PMC 120621. PMID 12149335. Wikidata Q33963814.
- Madhuri M Sopirala; Julie E Mangino; Wondwossen A Gebreyes; Beth Biller; Tammy Bannerman; Joan-Miquel Balada-Llasat; Preeti Pancholi (16 August 2010). "Synergy testing by Etest, microdilution checkerboard, and time-kill methods for pan-drug-resistant Acinetobacter baumannii". Antimicrobial Agents and Chemotherapy. 54 (11): 4678–4683. doi:10.1128/aac.00497-10. ISSN 0066-4804. PMC 2976112. PMID 20713678. Wikidata Q41817951.
- Wondwossen A Gebreyes; Jean Dupouy-Camet; Melanie J Newport; et al. (13 November 2014). "The global one health paradigm: challenges and opportunities for tackling infectious diseases at the human, animal, and environment interface in low-resource settings". PLoS Neglected Tropical Diseases. 8 (11) e3257. doi:10.1371/journal.pntd.0003257. ISSN 1935-2735. PMC 4230840. PMID 25393303. Wikidata Q34505260.
