= Leroy Coggins =

- Born: 1932
- Died: 2013 (aged 81)
- Education: Oklahoma State University; New York State College of Veterinary Medicine at Cornell University (PhD)
- Known for: Coggins Test for equine infectious anemia
- Scientific career
- Fields: Virology
- Workplaces: Cornell University; North Carolina State University College of Veterinary Medicine

Leroy Coggins (1932–2013) was a virologist who developed tests for African swine fever and equine infectious anemia. The latter is now known as the Coggins Test and a "negative Coggins" is commonly required when horses are sold or transported in the US.

Originally from North Carolina, Coggins studied at Oklahoma State University and in 1962 he completed a PhD at Cornell University's College of Veterinary Medicine. He went on to create the Coggins Test at Cornell, and it was approved for use in 1973. Coggins later became a department chair at the North Carolina State University College of Veterinary Medicine.
