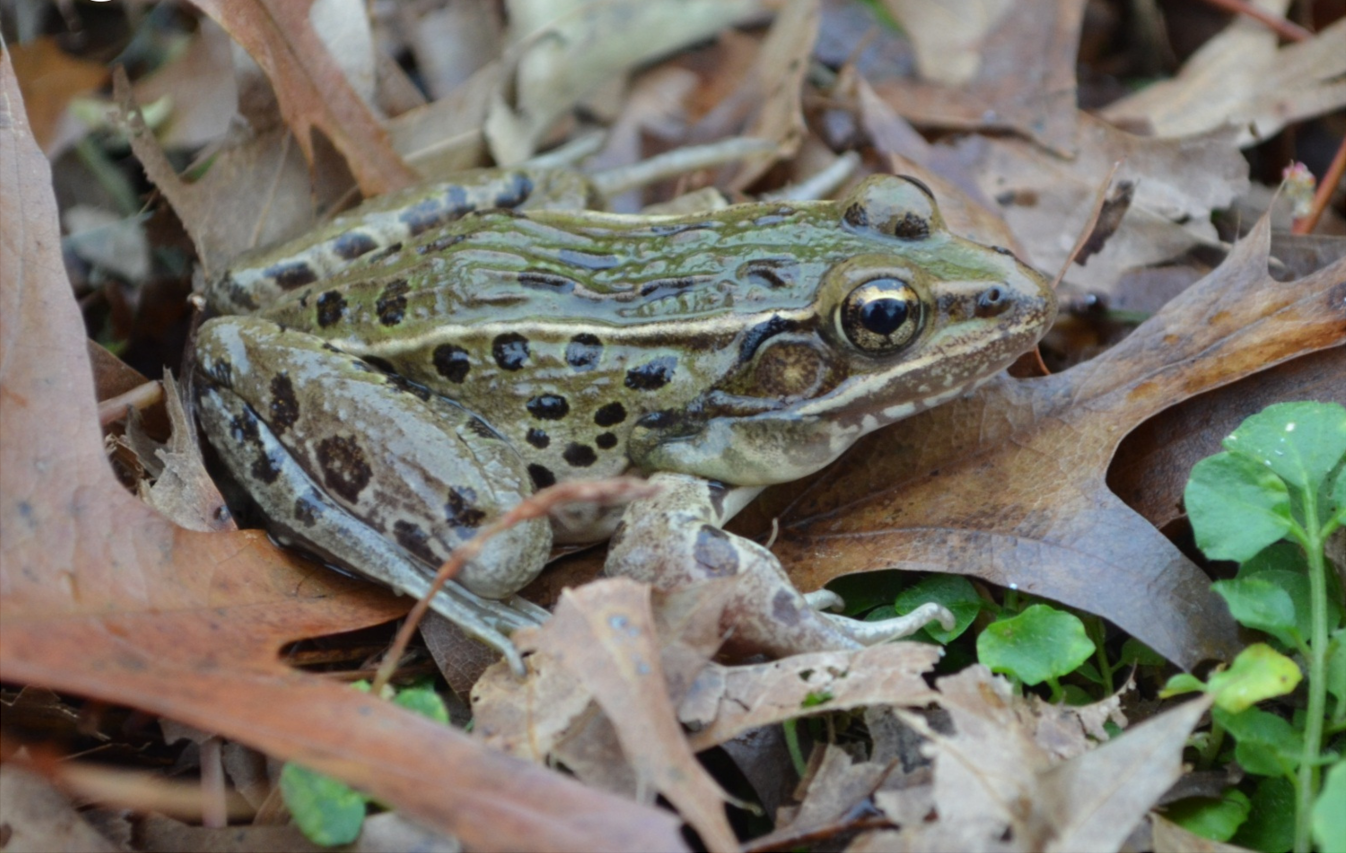

Conservation status
- Least Concern (IUCN 3.1)

- Vulnerable (NatureServe)

Scientific classification
- Kingdom: Animalia
- Phylum: Chordata
- Class: Amphibia
- Order: Anura
- Family: Ranidae
- Genus: Lithobates
- Species: L. kauffeldi

Binomial name
- Lithobates kauffeldi (Feinberg et al., 2014)
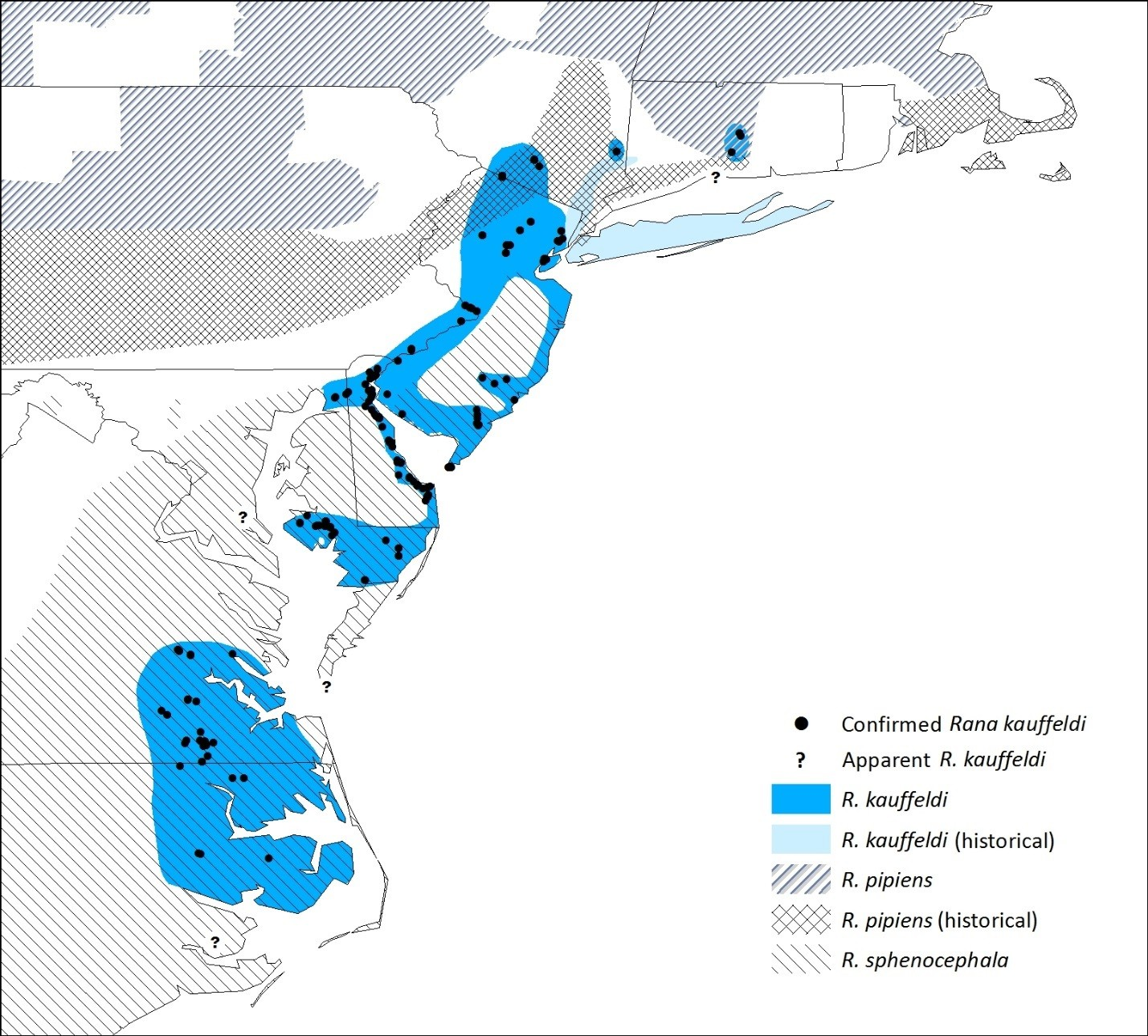
- Current (dark blue) and historical (light blue) range of L. kauffeldi, including its overlap with other leopard frog species (hashed)

Synonyms
- Rana kauffeldi Feinberg et al., 2014

= Atlantic Coast leopard frog =

Species of amphibian

The Atlantic Coast leopard frog (Lithobates kauffeldi) is a species of amphibian that is endemic to the United States. The species was described in 2014 from Staten Island. As a member of the genus Rana sensu lato, it is classified as a true frog, with typical smooth skin and a narrow waist. Its range stretches along the northern part of Eastern Seaboard, from Connecticut to North Carolina. The species takes its common name from the speckles on its legs and back reminiscent of a leopard pattern.

It is one of several species classified as leopard frogs, distinguished as unique through its mating call, genetic differences, habitat, and morphological distinctions.

== Etymology ==
The Atlantic Coast leopard frog is one of several species of leopard frogs. Its species name, kauffeldi, is derived from the name of Staten Island herpetologist Carl Frederick Kauffeld, who in 1936 proposed that there could be a third species of leopard frog inhabiting the New York metropolitan area, specifically Staten Island. The author team that described the species in 2014 christened it after Kauffeld in honor of him.

== Distribution and range ==
L. kauffeldi is found in nine states along the northeastern coast of the United States, from central Connecticut to northeastern North Carolina. The north-south range is approximately 780 km long, and the width is about 100 km from the Atlantic shoreline inward. The range narrows as it progressed southward, mostly along the I-95 corridor. It is thought to be extirpated from most of Connecticut, the Hudson Valley, and Long Island.

The Atlantic Coast leopard frog is sympatric with the northern leopard frog in Connecticut and the southern leopard frog from New Jersey through North Carolina. It apparently hybridizes with these species where they come into contact. For a time the species remained undiscovered because of its similarity to both of the aforementioned in physical appearance and habitat.

== Characteristics ==
The frogs' coloring ranges from mint-gray to light olive green, and brown spots distribute irregularly across their backs and legs. Dark snout lines run along their heads. They have large eyes and strong legs used for leaping. Coloring has been observed to change between day and night as well as with the seasons, with many individuals taking nocturnal darker tones and diurnal lighter hues. Adult males have large vocal sacs on either side of the head which are used to produce a mating call.

Distinguishing between Atlantic Coast leopard frogs and Southern leopard frogs is difficult. Key features that differentiate the Atlantic Coast leopard frog from the Southern leopard frog include the lack of a white spot on the tympanum, a femoral reticulum (inner thigh) that is primarily dark with unconnected light patches, a blunter snout, and duller coloration. However, there is significant overlap in these traits between the species and no single morphological trait can reliably differentiate the two.

Mating call is the most reliable distinguishing feature of the Atlantic Coast leopard frog. The Atlantic Coast leopard frog's call is a single and distinct "chuck" sound rather than the repeated "ak-ak-ak" of the Southern leopard frog or the "snore" of a Northern leopard frog.

== Breeding ==
The species breeds at a similar time of year as many other leopard frog species. The frogs commence migrations in February and March. As the air temperature rises in March and April, males begin consistent nocturnal choruses of mating calls, though both sustained diurnal and nocturnal choruses have been observed. They float in shallow water in groups of five or more and call to females. The advertisement call does not travel far, which may be a reason for dense groups.

Breeding continues through late winter and early spring, peaking in a two- to three-week period in late March and early April in New York. Eggs are laid in clusters.

== Habitat ==
The Atlantic Coast leopard frog occupies different habitats across its range. In the northern portion of its range (Delaware through Connecticut), it tends to inhabit large coastal or riparian wetland areas, such as marshes and wet meadows. This habitat usually includes clear, shallow water. It is commonly associated with plants such as Phragmites australis, cattails, or river shrubs. In Virginia and North Carolina, it primarily occupies riparian cypress-gum swamps. It is a habitat specialist when compared with sympatric Southern leopard frog, which occupy a larger variety of habitats. The Atlantic Coast leopard frog occupies fragmented wetland habitats in many urban areas across its range, including on Staten Island, the New Jersey Meadowlands, Philadelphia, and Wilmington-New Castle, Delaware.

== Conservation ==
The Atlantic Coast leopard frog has been extirpated from Long Island, parts of the Hudson Valley, and western Connecticut. While the species is considered least concern across its range, it is locally imperiled in five of the nine states in which it occurs. It is listed as an endangered species in Pennsylvania and New York.

Because it lives near the coast, the Atlantic Coast leopard frog is particularly susceptible to habitat destruction from development and sea level rise. It also may be particularly susceptible to diseases, including chytridiomycosis, ranavirus, and a perkinsea. Since its description in 2014, much of the species' habitat on Staten Island (its type locality) has been replaced by Amazon and Ikea warehouses.
