= Carl Kauffeld =

American herpetologist (1911–1974)

Carl Frederick Kauffeld
- Born: April 17, 1911; Philadelphia, Pennsylvania, U.S.
- Died: July 10, 1974 (aged 63); Staten Island, New York, U.S.
- Occupations: Curator of Reptiles, Director
- Years active: 1936–1973
- Organization: Staten Island Zoo
- Notable work: Snakes and their Ways (1937); Snakes and Snake Hunting (1957); Snakes: The Keeper and the Kept (1969)
- Spouse: Pauline Goodman

Carl Frederick Kauffeld (April 17, 1911 – July 10, 1974) was an American herpetologist. He served as curator of reptiles at the Staten Island Zoo from 1936 to 1963, and director of the zoo from 1963 to 1973.

== Early life ==
Carl Kauffeld did not attend college. Prior to working at the Staten Island Zoo, he worked for six years as an assistant to G.K. Noble, curator of herpetology at the American Museum of Natural History.

== Career ==
Carl Kauffeld authored over 200 publications. He wrote four books, including Snakes and Their Ways (1937), co-authored with Charles Howard Curran; Snakes and Snake Hunting (1957); Pet Alligators (1962); and Snakes: The Keeper and the Kept (1969). He co-authored the species description for the rattlesnake species Crotalus totonacus.

== Species names ==
In 1936, Carl Kauffeld proposed that a third, unnamed leopard frog species occurred in the New York Metropolitan Area. In 2014, this species was formally described and named Lithobates kauffeldi in honor of him.
