= Veranus Alva Moore =

American academic and pathologist (1859–1931)

- Born: April 13, 1859; Hounsfield, New York, US
- Died: February 11, 1931 (aged 71); Ithaca, New York, US
- Occupations: Professor and dean

Academic background
- Education: Cornell University, A.B. 1887; Columbian Medical School, MD 1890

Academic work
- Discipline: Pathology
- Sub-discipline: Bacteriologist
- Institutions: New York State College of Veterinary Medicine at Cornell University

Veranus Alva Moore (April 13, 1859 – February 11, 1931) was an American academic, bacteriologist, and pathologist. He was a founding faculty member and department chair of the New York State Veterinary College, now the New York State College of Veterinary Medicine at Cornell University. He was dean of the college for 21 years and became a national leader in veterinary science. He was also the superintendent of Memorial Hospital in Ithaca, New York. He was also a founder and first president of Phi Zeta honor society for veterinary medicine.

== Early life ==
Moore was born in Hounsfield, New York on April 13, 1859. His parents were Antoinette Eastman and Alva Moore. When he was thirteen years old, Moore's father died. Moore worked on a farm to support his mother and siblings. While working, he stepped on a nail, resulting in a bone infection in his foot that required him to use crutches from the age of 15 to 25, until he was cured by surgery. His injury resulted in seeing as many as 125 surgeons and physicians, including spending time at Bellevue Hospital, which sparked his interest in the medical profession.

Moore graduated from the Mexico Academy in Mexico, New York in 1882. He then taught school in Mexico for a year. He enrolled in Cornell University in 1883 to study medicine, graduating with an A.B. in 1887. While at Cornell, he was also a member of Phi Sigma Kappa fraternity.

Moore took a position as an assistant with the United States Department of Agriculture's Bureau of Animal Industry in Washington, D.C., while also attending graduate school. He then attended the Columbian Medical School (now Georgetown University School of Medicine), graduating with an M.D. in 1890.

== Career ==
After graduate school, Moore continued to work as an assistant at the United States Department of Agriculture's Division of Animal Pathology from 1890 to 1896, investigating infectious diseases. In this capacity, he conducted an in-depth study on the impact of cornstalk disease on cattle in the American Midwest. He spent several weeks investigating epizootic diseases in Minnesota in the fall of 1895. He was the chief of the Division of Animal Pathology from 1895 to 1896. At the same time, Moore was a professor of normal histology at the Columbian Medical School from 1894 to 1896, teaching evening courses. Moore resigned his position with the USDA in 1896 to become an academic.

When the New York State Veterinary College at Cornell University in Ithaca, New York opened September 1896, Moore was one of its founding faculty members. He was a professor of bacteriology, pathology, and meat inspection and chair of the Department of Veterinary and Comparative Pathology and Bacteriology. Moore was dean of the veterinary college from 1908 to 1929. Moore established the departments laboratory, which prepared vaccines for anthrax, glanders, and tuberculosis for veterinarians across New York state. This lab was considered "the best equipped of its kind and...a model for other scientific institutions."

Moore became a national leader in veterinary science. He perfected a way to identify the horse disease glanders, which was implemented across the United States. In 1903, he was hired by the University of California, Berkeley to spend two months studying diseases on fowl ranches in California. Moore was also a strong advocate of rabies legislation.

In 1905, President Theodore Roosevelt appointed Moore was a representative to the International Veterinary Congress's Conference on Tuberculosis in Budapest, Hungary. Moore reviewed the Federal Meat Inspection Act of 1906 and helped evaluate candidates for the United States Secretary of Agriculture in 1907. He was also appointed to the Ithaca Board of Health in 1910, serving for twelve years.

Moore was president of the Society of American Bacteriologists in 1910. During World War I, he was assigned to the Surgeon General's office, where he helped establish the United States Army Veterinary Corps. In 1930, President Herbert Hoover appointed Moore to serve on the White House Conference on Children and Youth.

Moore was also a member of the American Association for the Advancement of Science, the American Medical Association, the American Public Health Association, the American Veterinary Medical Association of Tompkins County, the National Association for the Study and Prevention of Tuberculosis, the New York State Medical Society, and the Society of American Pathologists and Bacteriologists. Moore published more than 250 papers in professional and government publications. He was elected to Ithaca's board of education for twelve years, becoming its president in 1922. In 1925, Moore helped establish Phi Zeta honor society for veterinary medicine and served as its first president. He also served as a faculty representative on Cornell University's board of trustees from 1926 to 1929.

Moore retired from Cornell University in 1929 as an emeritus dean at the age of seventy. He then became the superintendent of Ithaca Memorial Hospital, after having served as one of its trustees from January 1918 until late 1929. While he was dean at veterinary school, he helped the hospital establish a department of pathology and bacteriology.

== Honors ==
Moore was a member of Sigma Xi and Phi Kappa Phi honor societies.

Moore received an honorary Doctor of Veterinary Medicine from the University of Pennsylvania in 1911, and an honorary Doctor of Science from Syracuse University in 1919.

He was inducted as a Fellow of the Royal College of Surgeons in London, England, in January 1931.

Moore was included in the 1934 book, Dictionary of American Biography, volume 13. The biographical sketch was written by John R. Moher, chief of the U.S. Bureau of Animal Husbandry in Washington, D.C.

== Personal life ==
Moore married Mary L. Slawson of Cicero, New York on July 12, 1892. They had two sons and a daughter; both of his sons became doctors.

Moore was a director of the Ithaca Savings and Loan Association. He was a member of the Gown Club of Ithaca, the Ithaca Rotary Club, and joined the Cosmos Club of Washington, D.C. in 1895. He was master of the Hobasco Lodge No. 761 of the Free and Accepted Masons, district deputy of the Cayuga-Tompkins Masonic District, and belonged to Eagle Chapter 58 of the Royal Arch Masons; St. Augustine Commandry No. 38 of the Knights Templar; and the Kalurah Temple of the Shrine. Moore was also a member of the First Methodist Church in Ithaca.

Moore died in Ithaca Memorial Hospital in Ithaca, New York, on February 11, 1931. He had intestinal surgery the prior week and died from stress to his heart.

== Selected publications ==
- "Powdered soap as a cause of death among swill-fed hogs". Cornell University Agriculture Station Bulletin, no. 141 (November 1897) pp. 410–418.
- Laboratory directions for beginners in bacteriology. Ithaca: Press of Andrus & Church, 1898.
- "An inquiry concerning the source of gas and taint producing bacteria in cheese curd". with Archibald Robinson Ward. Cornell University Agriculture Station Bulletin, no. 158 (January 1899) pp. 222–237.
- The pathology and differential diagnosis of infectious diseases of animals. Ithaca: Taylor and Carpenter, 1902.
- Bacteria in milk. A summary of the present knowledge concerning their source and significance. Albany: State of New York, 1902.
- "Bovine Tuberculosis". Cornell University Agriculture Station Bulletin, no. 225 (February 1905) pp. 81–92.
- The pathology and differential diagnosis of infectious diseases of animals. Ithaca: Taylor and Carpenter, 1906.
- "The Bang method of controlling tuberculosis, with an illustration of its application". with H. A. Harding and George A. Smith. New York Agricultural Experiment Station Bulletin, no. 277 (1906).
- "Bovine tuberculosis". Cornell University Agriculture Station Bulletin, no. 250 (January 1908) pp. 268–288.
- "The elimination of tubercle bacilli from infected cattle, and the control of bovine tuberculosis and infected milk". Cornell University Agriculture Station Bulletin, no. 299 (May 1911) pp. 698–714.
- Principles of microbiology; a treatise on Bacteria, Fungi and Protozoa pathogenic for domesticated animals. Ithaca: Taylor and Carpenter, 1912.
- Bovine tuberculosis and its control. Ithaca: Carpenter & Company, 1913.
- Principles of Microbiology: a treatise on bacteria, fungi and protozoa pathogenic for domesticated animals. New York: The McMillian Company, 1916.
