= Charles Howard Curran =

Canadian entomologist (1894–1972)

- Born: 20 March 1894; Orillia, Ontario, Canada
- Died: 23 January 1972 (aged 77); Leesburg, Florida, United States
- Occupation: Entomologist

Charles Howard Curran (20 March 1894 – 23 January 1972) was a Canadian entomologist who specialized in Diptera. Curran's main taxonomic interests were in brachyceran flies, particularly the flower flies Syrphidae, in which he described 723 species. He described 2,648 species over his career. He was active in the study of insect control. His 1934 work The Families and Genera of North American Diptera was an important and comprehensive work on the topic of North American fly genera.

== Biography ==
Charles Howard Curran was born in Orillia, Ontario, in 1894. He was one of seven children, and preferred to go by his middle name Howard or his initials C. H. rather than Charles. He joined the Canadian Expeditionary Force and was sent to France to fight in World War I, serving from 1916 to 1918 as a machine gunner. Upon his return to Canada, he studied at the Ontario Agricultural College, gaining his bachelors degree in 1922. Continuing his story of entomology, he earned a Master of Science degree from the University of Kansas in 1923.

He joined the Dominion Entomology Branch in Ottawa (now the Canadian National Collection of Insects [CNC], Agriculture Canada), where he would work from 1922 or 1923 to 1928. During this period, he also researched and published on the Diptera collected from the Lang-Chapin expeditions to the Belgian Congo that the American Museum of Natural History had conducted from 1919–1925. In 1928, he was hired by the American Museum of Natural History (AMNH) as Assistant Curator. One of his first activities with the museum was an expedition to Barro Colorado Island (then part of the Panama Canal Zone) from December 1928 to February 1929 cataloguing Diptera in the region. In 1931, he donated his personal collection to the AMNH: it has 10,000 specimens representing about 1,700 species including 400 types. Curran was awarded a Doctor of Science from the University of Montreal in 1933 with his thesis "The Families and Genera of North American Diptera". His thesis would be published the next year in book form and considered the "main reference" on the topic for decades. He was vice-president of the New York Entomological Society in 1936, and president in the following year. He received a promotion to full Curator of Insects and Spiders at the American Museum of Natural History in 1947, and would serve the rest of his career there until his retirement in 1960.

Curran was one of the most prolific Diptera taxonomists, doing the majority of his work there from 1921 to 1947. He described 2,648 species and authored 406 publications, although some of his descriptions were later discovered to be synonyms with other species. From 1945 to his retirement, one of Curran's major projects was working in insect control with the Palisades Interstate Park Commission. Much of his work was study of the chemical DDT. Working in Bear Mountain, New York, he and his team studied DDT and its side effects. He also worked to capture high speed photography of a fly in flight. The footage he and his collaborator Henry M. Lester gained was widely distributed among entomologists. In his later career, rather than the academic monographs he wrote earlier, he began publishing books and articles aimed at a popular audience, including submissions in Natural History magazine.

Curran died in 1972 in Leesburg, Florida. Six genera and 71 species of insects are named in his honor.

== Selected works ==
- Insects of Porto Rico and the Virgin Islands: Diptera Or Two-winged Flies. New York Academy of Sciences. 1928.
- The Families and Genera of North American Diptera. Ballou Press. 1934. (2nd edition in 1965)
- Snakes and Their Ways. Harper & Brothers. 1937. (with Carl Kauffeld)
- Insects of the Pacific World. Macmillan. 1945.
- Insects in Your Life. Sheridan House. 1951.
