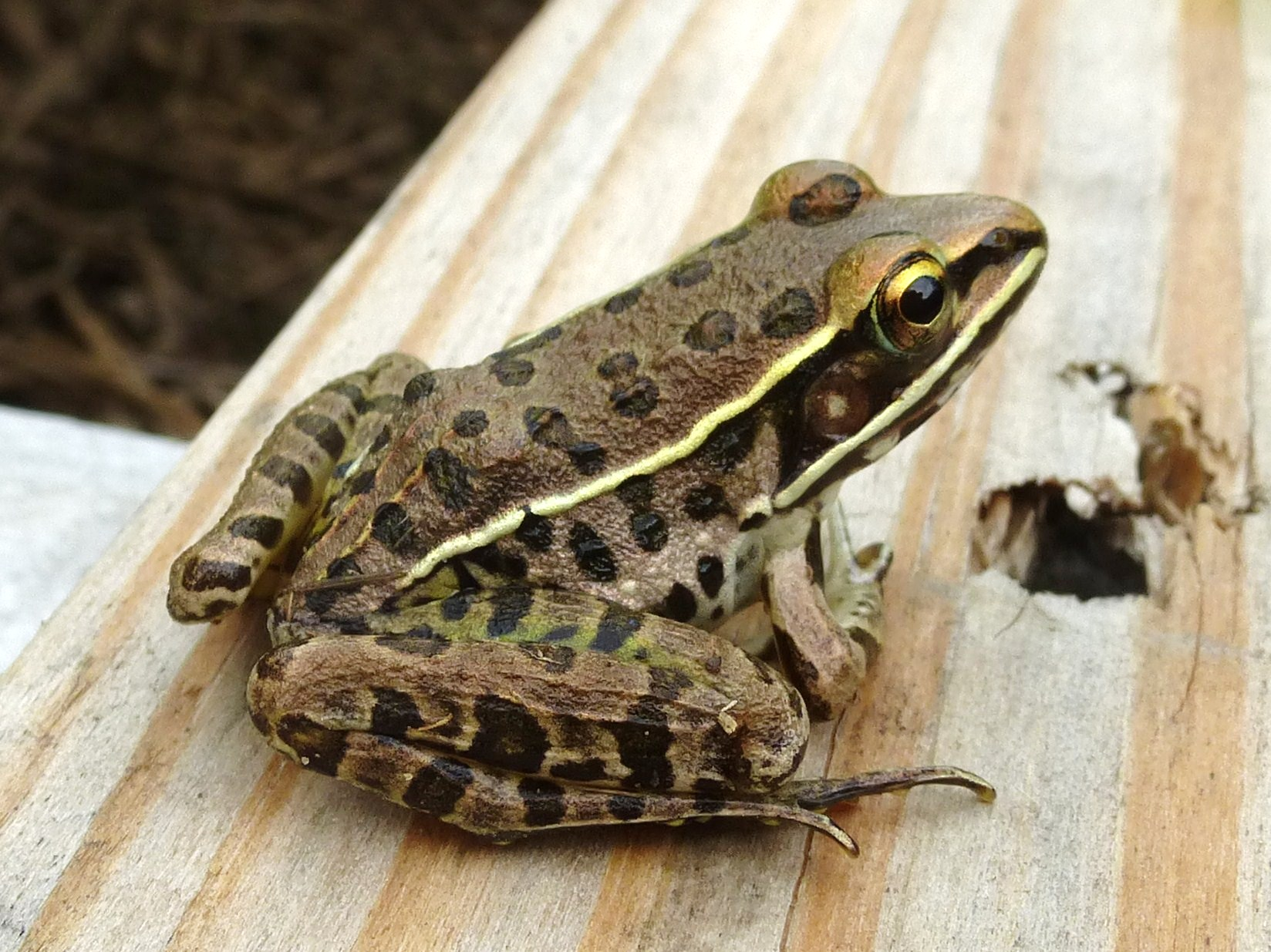
- Near the Ozarks in Missouri

Conservation status
- Least Concern (IUCN 3.1)

- Secure (NatureServe)

Scientific classification
- Kingdom: Animalia
- Phylum: Chordata
- Class: Amphibia
- Order: Anura
- Family: Ranidae
- Genus: Lithobates
- Species: L. sphenocephalus

Binomial name
- Lithobates sphenocephalus (Cope, 1889)

Synonyms
- Rana sphenocephala Cope, 1886; Rana halecina Holbrook, 1842; Rana halecina sphenocephala Cope, 1886; Rana utricularia sphenocephala Pace, 1974

= Southern leopard frog =

Species of amphibian

Lithobates sphenocephalus or Rana sphenocephala, commonly known as the southern leopard frog, is a medium-sized anuran in the family Ranidae (the true frogs). The southern leopard frog is one of the 36 species currently or formerly classified in the Rana genus found in North America. It is native to eastern North America from Kansas to New Jersey to Florida. It is also an introduced species in some areas.

== Description ==
This frog is up to 13 cm (5.1 in) long. Males at sexual maturity average 52.9 mm (2.08 in) snout to vent length and females average 63.8 mm (2.51 in) SVL. It is green or brown in color with a yellowish ridge along each side of the back. Rounded dark spots occur on the back and sides; a light spot is seen on each tympanum. The male has larger fore limbs than the female. The breeding male's vocal sacs are spherical when inflated. The call is described as a "ratchet-like trill", "chuckling croak", or a "squeaky balloon-like sound".

The larva is mottled, and the eyes are positioned on the top of the head. It grows to 7.6 cm (3.0 in) in length before maturing. The female lays an egg mass that is "baseball-sized" when close to hatching time, and contains up to 1,500 eggs. Some larva, eggs and embryos may be exposed to pesticides during their development causing significant mortality and developmental deformity.

It is possible to confuse this species for the similarly shaped and colored pickerel Frog (Lithobates palustris). However, pickerel frogs dark spots along their back are more rectangular, uniform, and form rows. The spot in the center of their tympanum, if present, is a dark green/brown rather than a stark white. Southern Leopard Frogs may also be confused with the Atlantic Coast Leopard Frog (Lithobates kauffeldi) in the northern portion of its range. Where both species occur, it may be impossible to confidently distinguish the two. However, Southern Leopard Frogs have a lighter femoral reticulum (inner thigh), more elongate snout, and light spot on the tympanum.

== Ecology and behavior ==
This frog lives in many types of shallow freshwater habitat and sometimes in slightly brackish water. They usually look for wetter environments that have herbaceous plant cover and low canopy. It is usually found close to water, but it can stay on dry land for long periods of time. During warmer months, it moves away from the water for most of the time, It is mostly nocturnal, but it can be active during the day and the night, especially during rainfall. It breeds in the winter and spring, and sometimes in the fall. While there is a relationship between month and breeding activity, mean daily precipitation is the main factor that determines breeding activity. They have been observed depositing eggs communally in cold weather but independently in warm weather. Breeding can occur throughout the year in southern states but typically occurs in early spring Mating takes place from February to December with a peak from April to August. with both sexes having their lowest fat storage during late-winter-spring, indicative of the commencement of breeding. The southern populations breed the longest. They can breed in a variety of aquatic habitats ranging from ephemeral to permanent. The egg mass is connected to aquatic vegetation. It typically nests communally in cooler weather, and individually in warmer weather. Communal egg deposition in cooler temperatures is thought to be an adaptation for increased egg and embryo survival, creating a thermal advantage, similar to that of the Wood frog. Eggs hatch in 4 days to nearly two weeks. It has been shown that L. sphenocephalus eggs hatch more quickly in response to the presence of predators such as crayfish. Invasive Chinese tallow also affect the survival of Leopard frog eggs due to the leaves affecting the dissolved oxygen in water, where young eggs do not survive but more developed eggs may survive. The tadpoles take 50 to 75 days to develop to adulthood. High protein diets lead to better disease resistance in tadpoles

In northern parts of its range, it is dormant during the winter, where it remains in well-oxygenated, unfrozen water bodies. The recorded highest altitude of this species is 1,000 feet.

Southern leopard frogs feed primarily on insects, crayfish, and other invertebrates. As tadpoles they are herbivores, and transition to a carnivorous diet as they age. They forage in upland areas during the summer. In other parts of their range, their diet consists mainly of spiders, beetles, and gastropods such as snails.

Studies involving southern leopard frogs found that geographically separated populations produce distinct numbers and combinations of antimicrobial peptides (AMPs) in response to growing infection rate of fungal pathogen Batrachochytrium dendrobatidis. These AMPs mature and are excreted around 12-weeks post-metamorphosis.

== Range ==
This frog is widespread across eastern North America, especially the Southeast US. It is the most common frog in Florida and several other regions. It is an introduced species in The Bahamas, in Arizona and at two locations in California. Southern leopard frogs are believed to have been introduced to the Prado Flood Control Basin via a shipment of aquatic fauna to the Chino Gun Club in 1929 or 1930; they are now common in areas of the basin undergoing urbanization. Loss of forests is a concern as it is among the leading cause of population decline. A second established population of the species in California is now suspected, following the March 2016 discovery of two females in the San Joaquin River just northwest of Fresno on the border between Madera and Fresno Counties. A third species has recently discovered in southern New York, northern New Jersey, and western Connecticut.

== Subspecies ==
The subspecies are:

- L. s. sphenocephalus – Florida leopard frog
- L. s. utricularius – Southern leopard frog

== Gallery ==
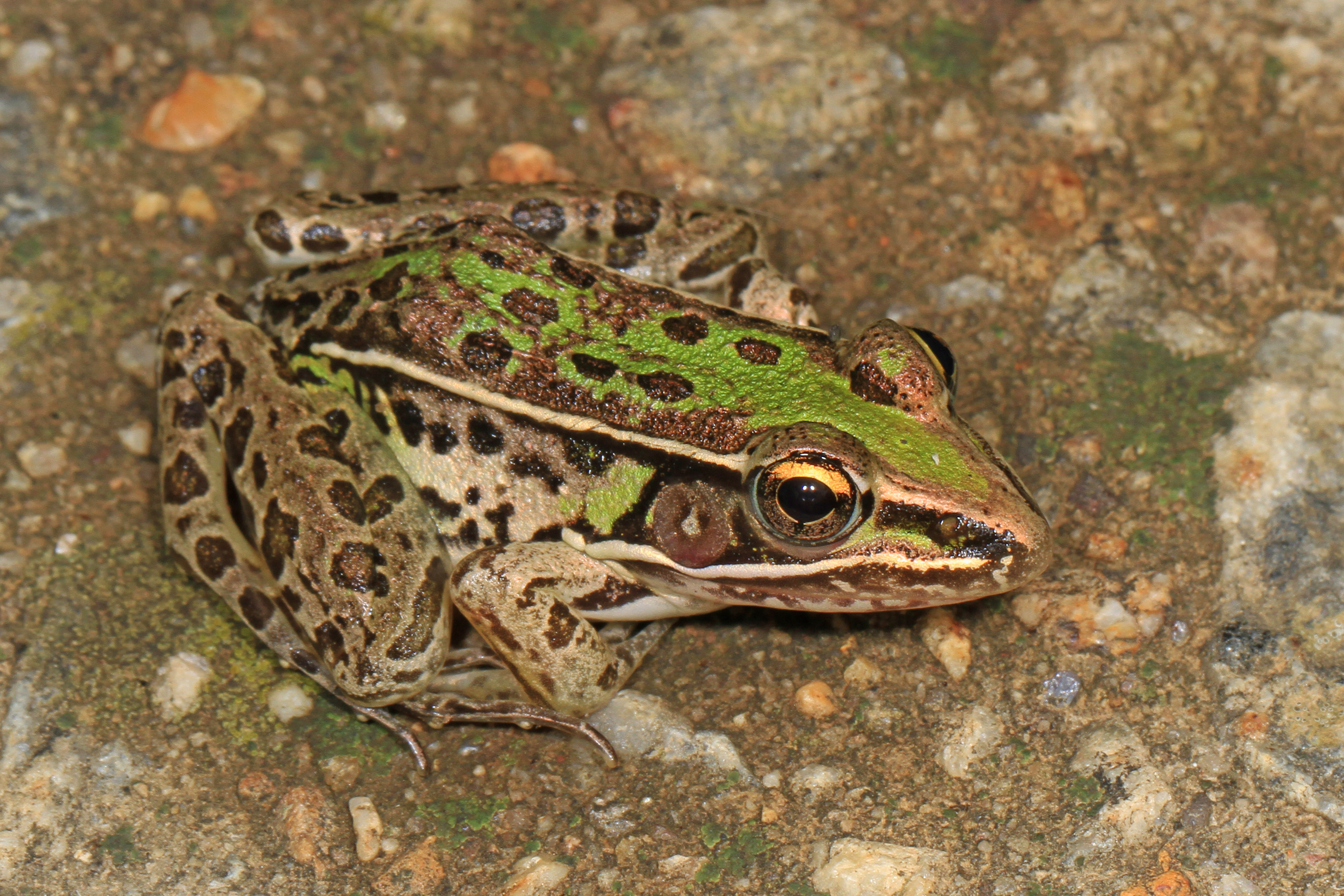
Southern Leopard Frog (Lithobates sphenocephalus), Occoquan Bay National Wildlife Refuge, Woodbridge, Virginia

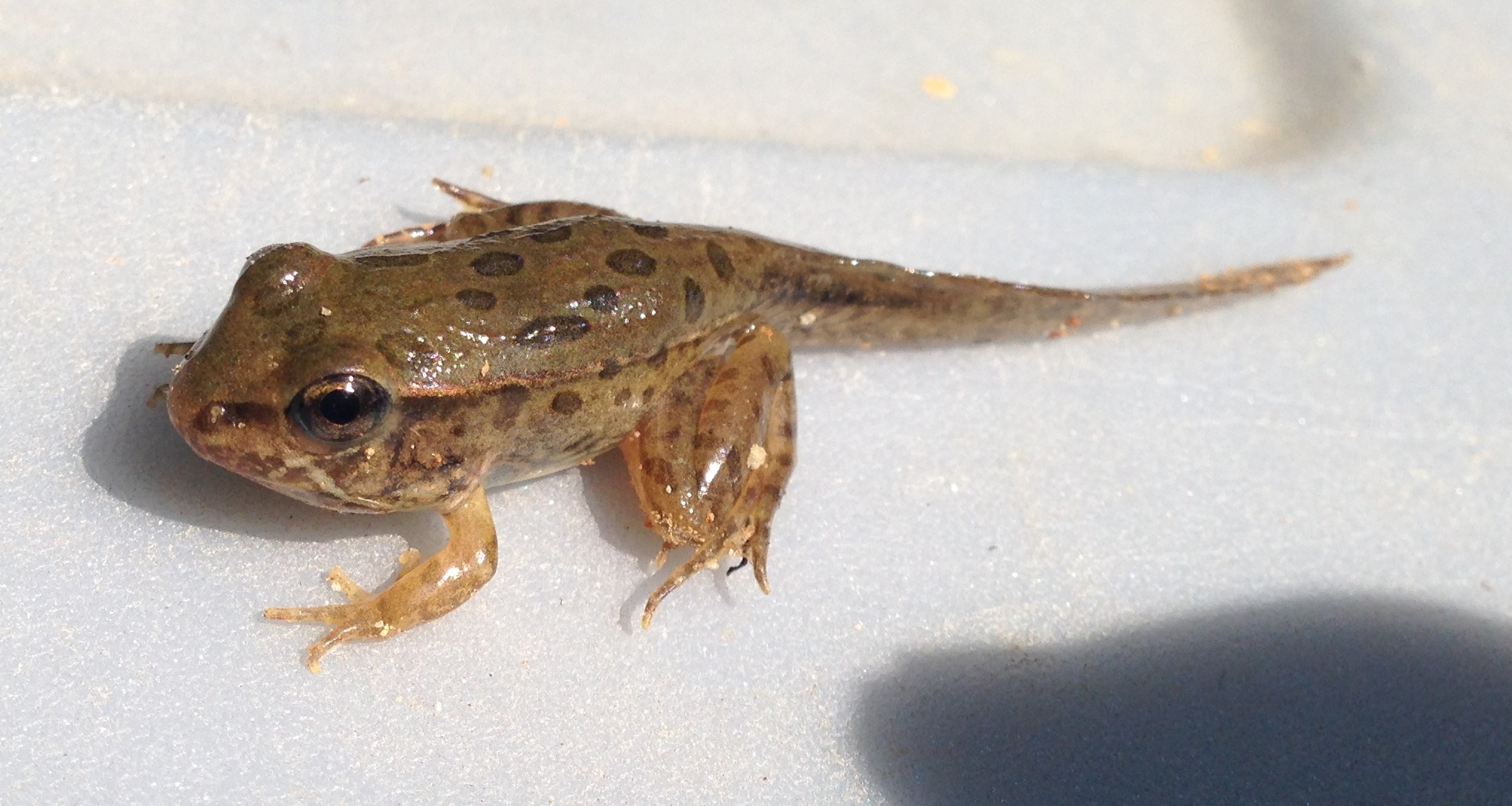
A metamorph

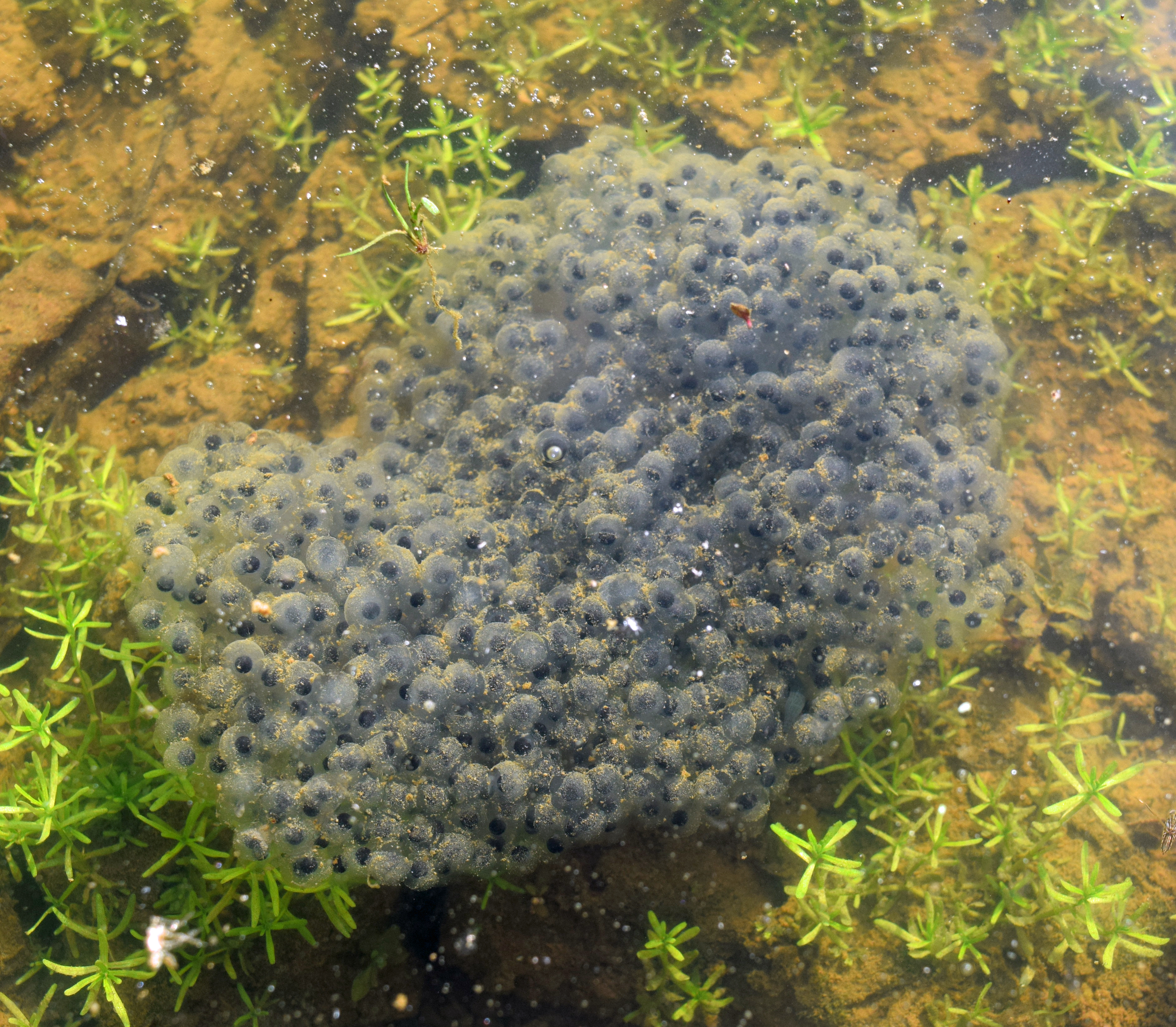
Egg mass
