= Staten Island Zoo =

Zoo in Staten Island, New York

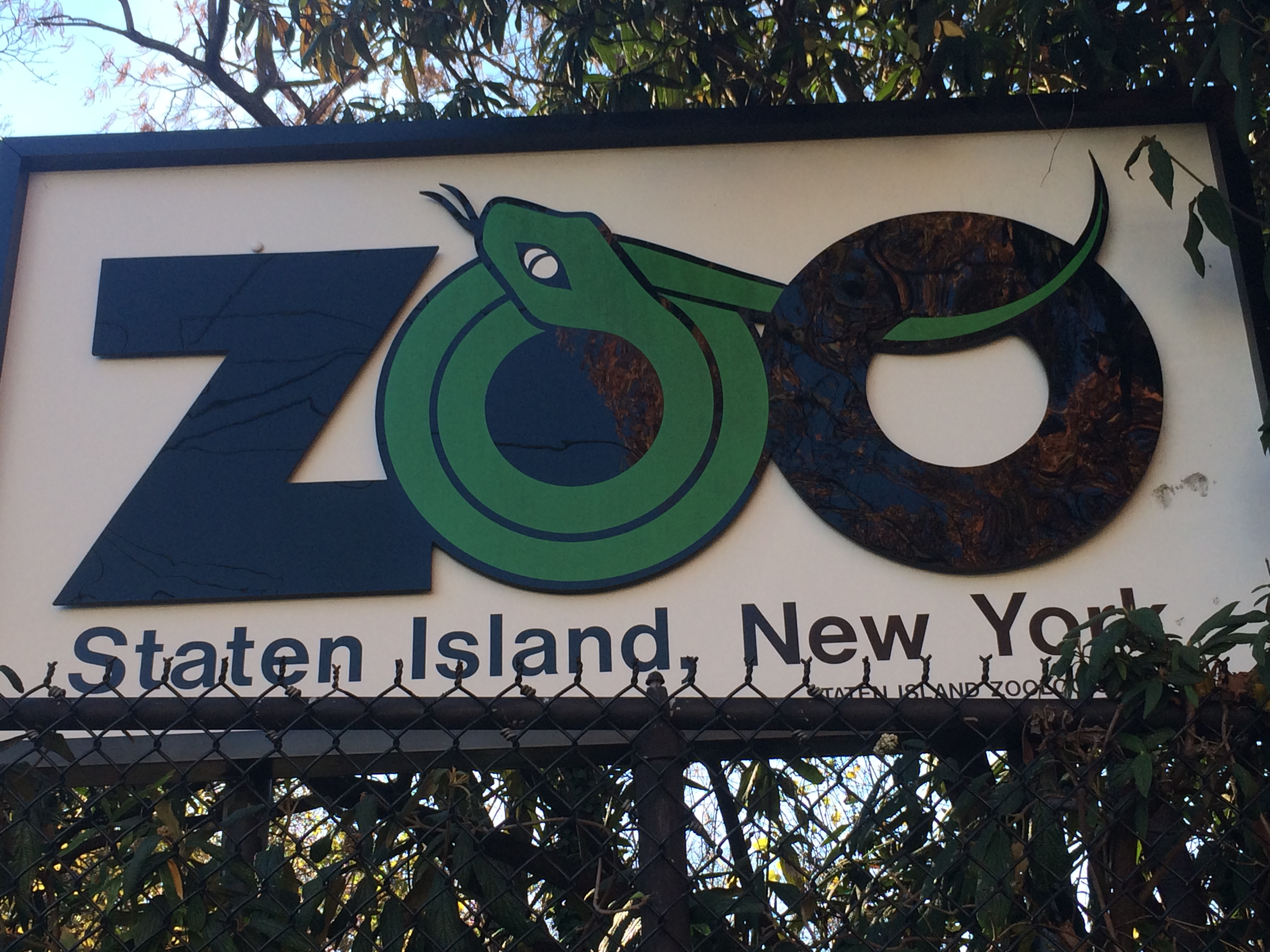
- Staten Island Zoo Logo

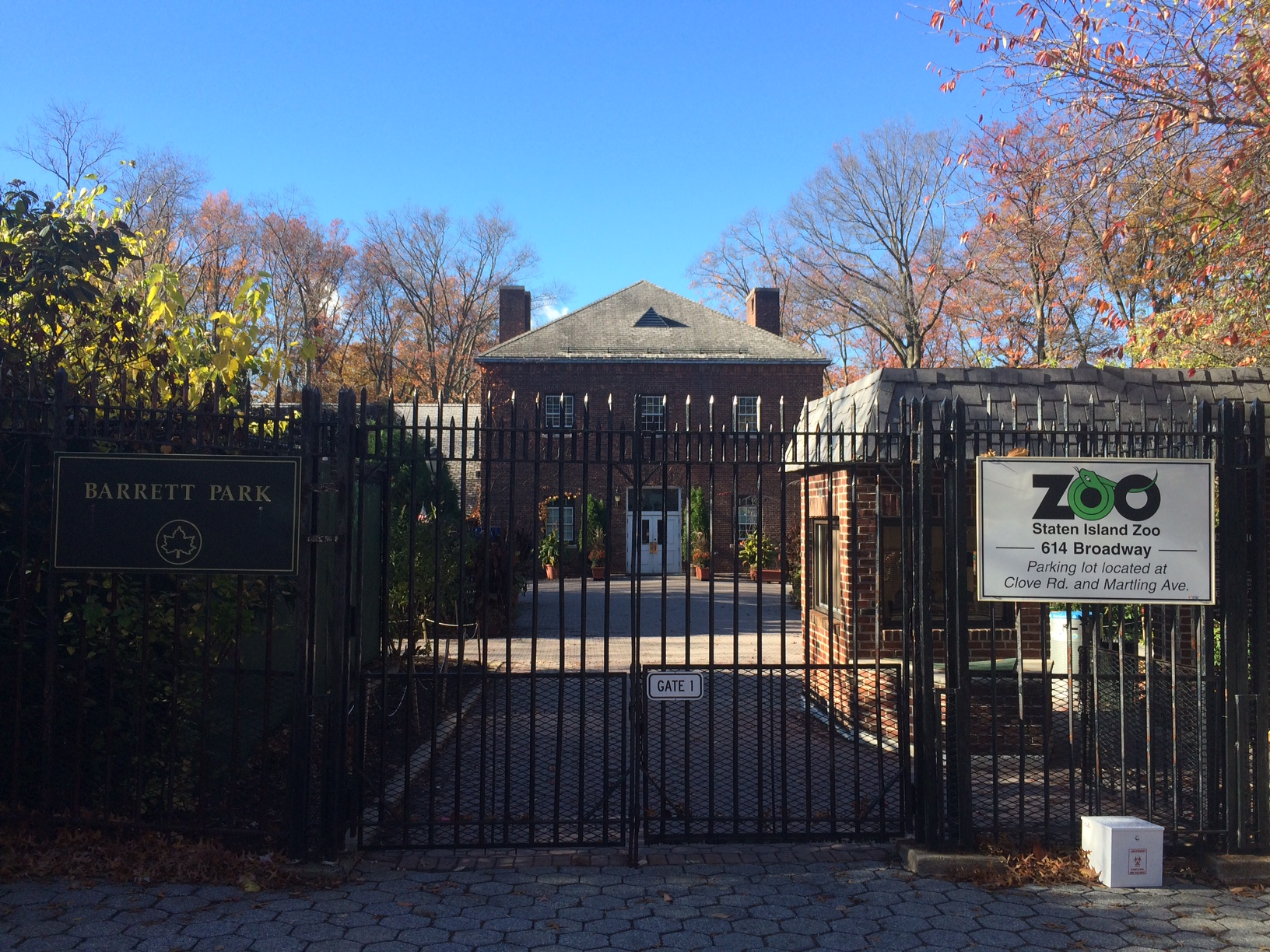
- Staten Island Zoo Entrance
- Interactive map of Staten Island Zoo
- 40.625°N 74.115°W
- Date opened: June 10, 1936
- Location: 614 Broadway, Staten Island
- Land area: 8 acres (3.2 ha)
- No. of animals: 1400
- No. of species: 320
- Memberships: Association of Zoos and Aquariums (AZA)
- Major exhibits: Africa, Tropical Forest, Reptile Wing
- Public transit: Bus: S48, S53
- Website: statenislandzoo.org

The Staten Island Zoo is an 8-acre (3.2 ha) urban zoo in West New Brighton, Staten Island, New York City. The zoo is open year-round except on Thanksgiving, Christmas, and New Year's Day. It has been accredited by the Association of Zoos and Aquariums (AZA) since 1988.

== History ==
The history of the Staten Island Zoo (Barrett Park) can be traced back to three Staten Island War heroes: Colonel Edward Harden, Colonel Richard Penn Smith, and Major Clarence Barrett. In the 1800s, Staten Island was home to many ranking military leaders including Colonel Harden and Colonel Penn Smith whose estates were located right across from each other on opposite sides of Clove Road.

The Staten Island Zoo was built on the former estate grounds of Colonel Edward Harden. Colonel Harden fought in the Spanish–American War and moved to 614 Broadway on Staten Island in 1908 with his wife Julia Harden where they resided in what was later known as the "Harden Mansion". Julia Harden willed the land to the city upon her death under three conditions: that it be named for her brother-in-law, Civil War Major Clarence Barrett, that the property not be used for a playground, and that her husband Colonel Harden be allowed to reside in the house that stood on the property. Julia Harden died in 1930 and the property was transferred to the city of New York. The mansion stands on the north side of the zoo, used for offices.

The site was (and still is) officially called "Barrett Park" in city planning records and it wasn't until the 1960s when "Staten Island Zoo" became the popular name for the site. In the first few years, the only mention of "Zoo" in the Zoo signs were in the word "Zoological" for the "Staten Island Zoological Society" which operated Barret Park.

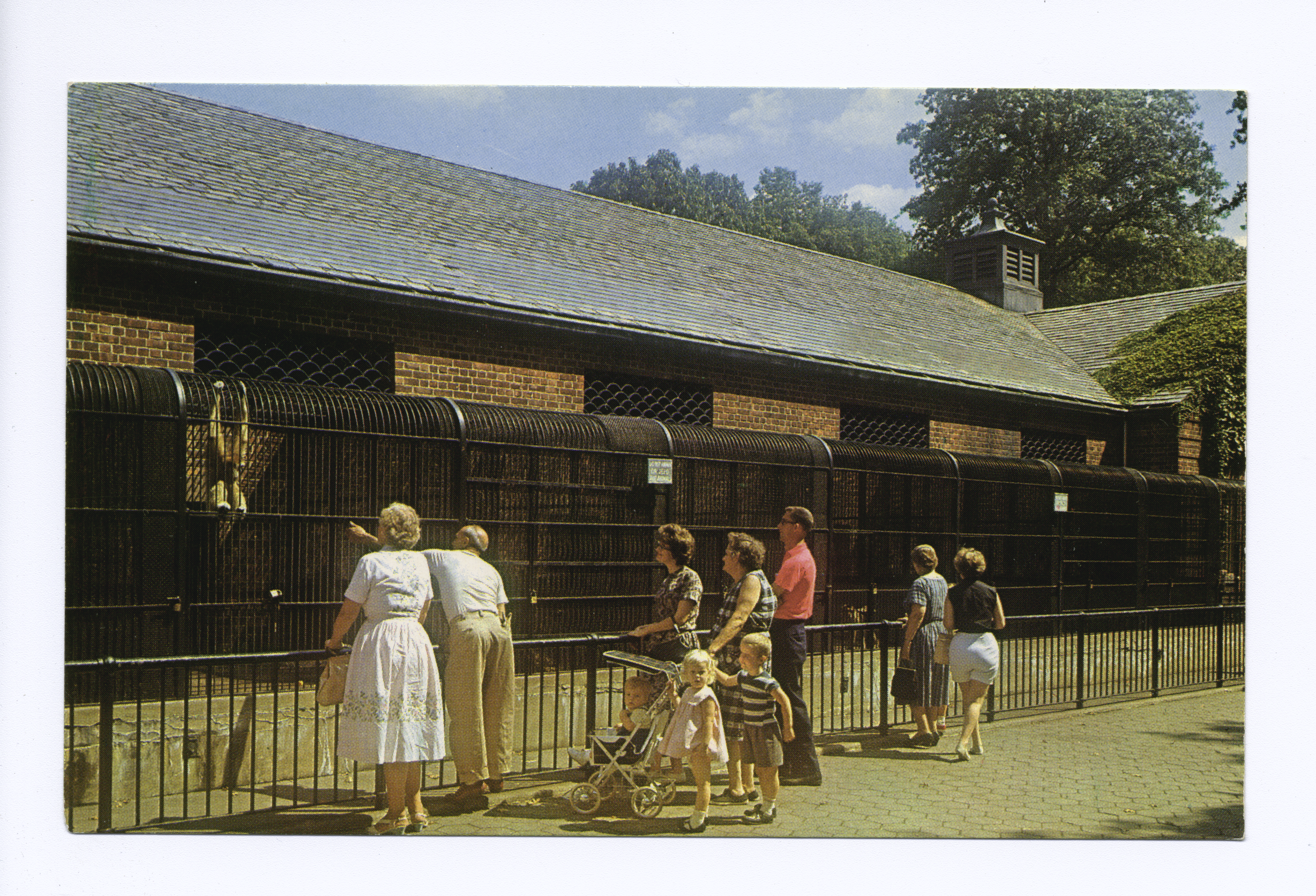
Monkey House, middle 20th century

In August 1933, the Staten Island Zoological Society was created and the park built by the Civilian Conservation Corps. On March 25, 1935, the Egbert-Robillard Bill was passed by the New York State Senate to have the city provide maintenance for the zoo. Two months later on May 7, 1935, the Governor of New York signed an agreement to allocate public funds for the zoo to cover operational and maintenance costs while the exhibits, animal care and educational programs were to be maintained by the Staten Island Zoological Society With the land now owned by the city and a Zoological Society in place to run and administer the site, zoo construction commenced in 1933 as part of the Federal Government's works program to convert the 8-acre estate into a zoo. The zoo opened to the public on June 10, 1936, and was considered the first U.S. "educational zoo".

From 1942 to 1966, Patricia O'Connor served as the chief animal caretaker at the zoo. She was reported to be "the only woman veterinarian in any zoo in the country."

In 1949 the zoo boasted a collection of over 1,200 animals, a 400-seat auditorium, and greeted 500,000 visitors per year. The zoo was reported to be "spotless, modern, and odorless."

The parking lot which was built in 1968 and was built on a plot of land across from the zoo on the corner of Clove Road and Martling Avenue, The property was originally the mansion of United States Civil War Colonel Richard Penn Smith who fought at the Battle of Gettysburg. The war hero resided in Staten Island and is buried in Staten Island's Moravian Cemetery on Richmond Road. Smith's large stately home and surrounding plot of land was later purchased by the Actors Fund which turned the home into a retreat for actors with 50 bedrooms and views of Martling Pond. In the late 1920s, the retreat was closed and the 20 acres of the estate were eventually acquired and split between the Staten Island Zoological Society for use as a parking lot and by the Saint Peter's Cemetery for expansion of burial sites.

In 1971 several animals at the zoo died from what later was found to be lead poisoning. A black leopard named Mr Leo Pard suffered severe nerve damage due to lead poisoning. It was later found that the source of the lead was from tetraethyllead an additive in gasoline. This incident contributed to the phaseout and ban of leaded gasoline in the United States.

The logo for the zoo was designed by Vincent J Mielcarek Sr, who designed many other logos around Staten Island from the 60's through the 80's.

In 2024, the city's Public Design Commission announced plans to install a decorative entrance for the zoo on Clove Road.

== Staten Island Zoological Society ==
Unlike all the other zoos in New York City, which are operated by the Wildlife Conservation Society (WCS), the Staten Island Zoo is operated by the Staten Island Zoological Society which was created in August 1933 under the organization of Harold O'Connel. Local legend maintains that the society was partially formed from the Staten Island Reptile Club which was located nearby on Britton Street and Broadway. Although no written documentation exists regarding the merger it would explain the newly formed Staten Island Zoological Society's affinity for reptiles and why the zoo was (and still is) known for its extensive reptile collection. Just short of one year after its organization on July 24, 1934, the Staten Island Zoological Society was officially incorporated. The Society included Harold O'Connel, Ellsworth Buck, Dr. James Chapin, George Allison, and Howard Worzel.

The Staten Island Zoological Society created the Zoo with the founding principle that it be an educational zoo. The Society held monthly evening lectures at the zoo, provided lessons at local schools, and provided zoo tours for school children. The zoo later expanded its education program under the zoo veterinarian, Dr. Patricia O'Conner, to include educational programs for hospital children and educational courses at the zoo for high school teachers and lectures for educators and local animal and wildlife clubs. The Staten Island Zoo still continues providing on-site and in-school lessons and special educational programs at the zoo. With a fully operational on-site veterinary clinic, the zoo has an extensive internship program for college students studying to become veterinary technicians and veterinarians. A small lecture auditorium was built in the basement level of the zoo building and a classroom and a private library are located on the second floor of the zoo building along with the administrative offices of the Zoological Society.

== Animals ==
Initially, the focus of the zoo was reptiles, in particular including the collection of snakes housed in the zoo's Serpentarium. Although the focus of the zoo has broadened, the zoo's collection of rattlesnakes is still regarded as among the largest and most complete in North America. The current collection comprises over 1,550 animals of over 360 different species. Among the zoo's current exhibits is the African Savannah at Twilight.

Many of the animals were obtained through purchases and through procurements from other zoological parks. From the 1930s to the early 1960s, animals were also acquired through annual expeditions by zoological staff such as the collection trip in 1936 by curator Carl Kauffeld for rattlesnakes and a later 1965 trip by zookeeper Bob Zappalorti and through donations such as a pair of solenodons which were donated by the Dominican Republic's Rafael Trujillo. The collection of marine fish was donated by the Staten Island Aquarium Society in the late 1950s.

A New York Times article in 1944 reported that there were "over 600" animals at the zoo, including a binturong, an ocelot, a spider monkey, a herring gull, as well as an African leopard named Tommy.

In 1949, the Times reported that the zoo held over 1,200 animals, including a concave-casqued hornbill, a white pelican, a Pel's fishing owl, a black mangabey ape, a pair of Guatemalan quetzal birds, a regal python, and "perhaps the only bushmaster snake in the country."

The zoo is also the home of Staten Island Chuck, a groundhog who is the official Groundhog Day forecaster for New York City, and Grandpa, a black-handed spider monkey who made local newspapers when he accurately "predicted" the outcome of six out of nine matches during the U.S. Open Tennis Championship.

The older "Tropical Forest" wing underwent a modular update to include improved humidity-controlled environments for the Green Anaconda and Chinese Alligator.

Other animals include:

- Spider monkeys
- Patagonian cavy
- Groundhog
- Chinese alligator
- Red kangaroo
- Tawny frogmouth
- Serval
- Highland cow
- Fennec fox
- Capybara
- Donkey
- Green anaconda
- Emu
- Ibex
- Sloth
- Ostrich
- Binturong
- Roadrunner
- Bearded dragon
- Meerkat
- Amur leopard
- Southern ground hornbill
- Pacu
- Giant Anteater
- Chacoan Peccary

== Transportation ==
The zoo is accessible by the S48 and S53 bus routes. There are no Staten Island Railway stations in the vicinity of the zoo.
