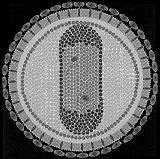

Virus classification
- (unranked): Virus
- Realm: Riboviria
- Kingdom: Pararnavirae
- Phylum: Artverviricota
- Class: Revtraviricetes
- Order: Ortervirales
- Family: Retroviridae
- Genus: Lentivirus
- Species: Lentivirus equinfane

= Equine infectious anemia =

Equine infectious anemia virus

Species of virus

Equine infectious anemia or equine infectious anaemia (EIA), also known by horsemen as swamp fever, is a horse disease caused by a retrovirus (Equine infectious anemia virus) and transmitted by bloodsucking insects. The virus (EIAV) is endemic in the Americas, parts of Europe, the Middle and Far East, Russia, and South Africa. The virus is a lentivirus, like human immunodeficiency virus (HIV). Like HIV, EIA can be transmitted through blood, milk, and body secretions. Transmission is primarily through biting flies, such as the horse-fly and deer-fly. The virus survives up to 4 hours in the vector. Contaminated surgical equipment and recycled needles and syringes, and bits can transmit the disease. Mares can transmit the disease to their foals via the placenta. The risk of transmitting the disease is greatest when an infected horse is ill, as the blood levels of the virus are then highest.

== Stages ==
Acute: The acute form is a sudden onset of the disease at full-force. Symptoms include high fever, anemia (due to the breakdown of red blood cells), weakness, swelling of the lower abdomen and legs, weak pulse, and irregular heartbeat. The horse may die suddenly.

Subacute: A slower, less severe progression of the disease. Symptoms include recurrent fever, weight loss, an enlarged spleen (felt during a rectal examination), anemia, and swelling of the lower chest, abdominal wall, penile sheath, scrotum, and legs.

Chronic: The horse tires easily and is unsuitable for work. The horse may have a recurrent fever and anemia, and may relapse to the subacute or acute form even several years after the original attack.

A horse may also not appear to have any symptoms, yet still tests positive for EIA antibodies. Such a horse can still pass on the disease. According to most veterinarians, horses diagnosed EIA positive usually do not show any sign of sickness or disease.

EIA may cause abortion in pregnant mares. This may occur at any time during the pregnancy if there is a relapse when the virus enters the blood. Most infected mares will abort, however some give birth to healthy foals. Foals are not necessarily infected.

Recent studies in Brazil on living wild horses have shown that in the Pantanal, about 30% of domesticated and about 5.5% of the wild horses are chronically infected with EIA. The Pantaneiro breed, found in the Pantanal, is tolerant to EIA but infected horses have lower productivity than uninfected ones.

== Prevention and treatment ==
A vaccine is available, called "Chinese Live Attenuated EIA vaccine", developed in China and widely used there since 1983. Another attenuated live virus vaccine is in development in the United States.

Reuse of syringes and needles is a risk factor for transfer of the disease. Currently in the United States, all horses that test positive must be reported to federal authorities by the testing laboratory. EIA-positive horses are infected for life. Options for the horse include sending the horse to a recognized research facility, branding the horse and quarantining it at least 200 yards from other horses for the rest of its life, and euthanizing the horse. Very few quarantine facilities exist, which usually leads to the option of euthanizing the horse. The Florida Research Institute for Equine Nurturing, Development and Safety (a.k.a. F.R.I.E.N.D.S.) is one of the largest such quarantine facilities and is located in south Florida. The horse industry and the veterinary industry strongly suggest that the risks posed by infected horses, even if they are not showing any clinical signs, are enough of a reason to impose such stringent rules. The precise impacts of the disease on the horse industry are unknown.

== Diagnosis ==
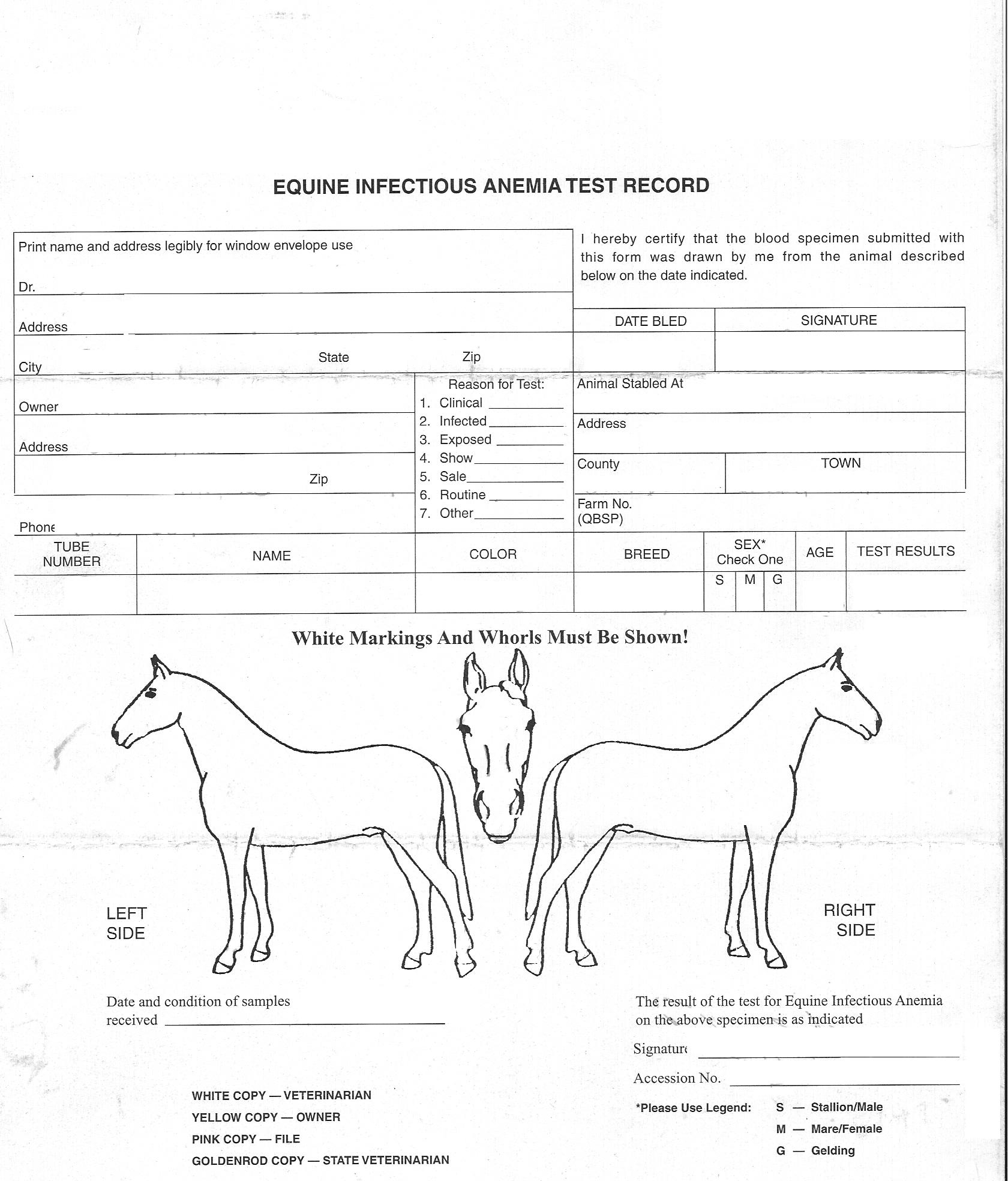
The Coggins test submission form, which requires identification of the horse's physical appearance

The Coggins test (agar immunodiffusion) is a sensitive diagnostic test for equine infectious anemia developed by Leroy Coggins in the 1970s.

Currently, the US does not have an eradication program due to the low rate of incidence. However, many states require a negative Coggins test for interstate travel. In addition, most horse shows and events require a negative Coggins test. Most countries require a negative test result before allowing an imported horse into the country.

Horse owners should verify that all the horses at a breeding farm and or boarding facility have a negative Coggins test before using the services of the facility. A Coggins test should be done on an annual basis. Tests every 6 months are recommended if there is increased traveling.
