= Bufagin =

Identifiers
| CAS Number | 102648-38-4 |

Properties
| Chemical formula | C_{24}H_{34}O_{5} |
| Molar mass | 402.531 g·mol^{−1} |
| Density | 1.240 g/cm^{3} |
| Melting point | 212-213 ˚C |
- Except where otherwise noted, data are given for materials in their standard state (at 25 °C [77 °F], 100 kPa). Infobox references

Bufagin is a toxic steroid C_{24}H_{34}O_{5} obtained from toad's milk, the poisonous secretion of a skin gland on the back of the neck of a large toad (Rhinella marina, synonym Bufo marinus, the cane toad). The toad produces this secretion when it is injured, scared or provoked. Bufagin resembles chemical substances from digitalis in physiological activity and chemical structure.

Bufagin also refers to any of several similar substances found as components of the mixture bufotoxin in secretions of other toads, as well as plants and mushrooms.

== History ==
The discovery of bufagin has taken place in the fall of 1910, where John Jacob Abel and David I. Macht are investigating the property of unknown substances from a tropical toad, Bufo agua. They collected the "milky secretion" squirted out of toad’s parotoid gland due to the control of the central nervous system while it was strongly irritated. They observed the semifluid substance is quickly dried in the air and formed a yellow and hard scales that shared a similar appearance with dried snake venom. After the experiments with the poison, John Jacob Abel and David I. Macht found there are epinephrin and a newly discovered substance exist within the secretion, which they originally gave the name of “bufagin” to this digitalis-like substance. They also quantitatively analyzed the amounts of epinephrin and bufagin in the poison, which showed that 0.734 gram of bufagin with respect to 0.1 gram of epinephrin presented.

== Chemistry ==
Gamabufagin

Bufagin and bufagins are bufadienolide derivatives. This means they are steroids with a six-membered lactone (α-pyrone) ring attached to ring D (the five-membered one). The difference to digitalis compounds is that the latter have a fix-membered lactone (α-furan) ring that has one carbon atom and one double bond less.

Bufagin is the category name of a large bufadienolide family, there are at least 86 identified bufagins. Examples of bufagins are:

- Arenobufagin, from the Argentine toad (Chaunus arenarum, synonym Bufo arenarum);
- Bufotalin, from the cane toad (Rhinella marina, synonym Bufo marinus);
- Cinobufagin, from the Chusan Island toad (Bufo gargarizans);
- Gamabufagin, from the Japanese toad (Bufo japonicus);
- Marinobufagin, from Bufo rubescens and the cane toad (Bufo marinus);
- Quercicobufagin, from the oak toad (Anaxyrus quercicus, synonym Bufo quercicus);
- Regularobufagin, from the square-marked toad (Amietophrynus regularis, synonym Bufo regularis);
- Vallicepobufagin, from the Gulf Coast toad (Incilius valliceps, synonym Bufo valliceps);
- Viridibufagin, from the European green toad (Bufo viridis)

These bufagins, and especially cinobufagin, have given rise to a large number of derivatives evaluated as potential anti-tumor drugs.

=== Synthesis ===
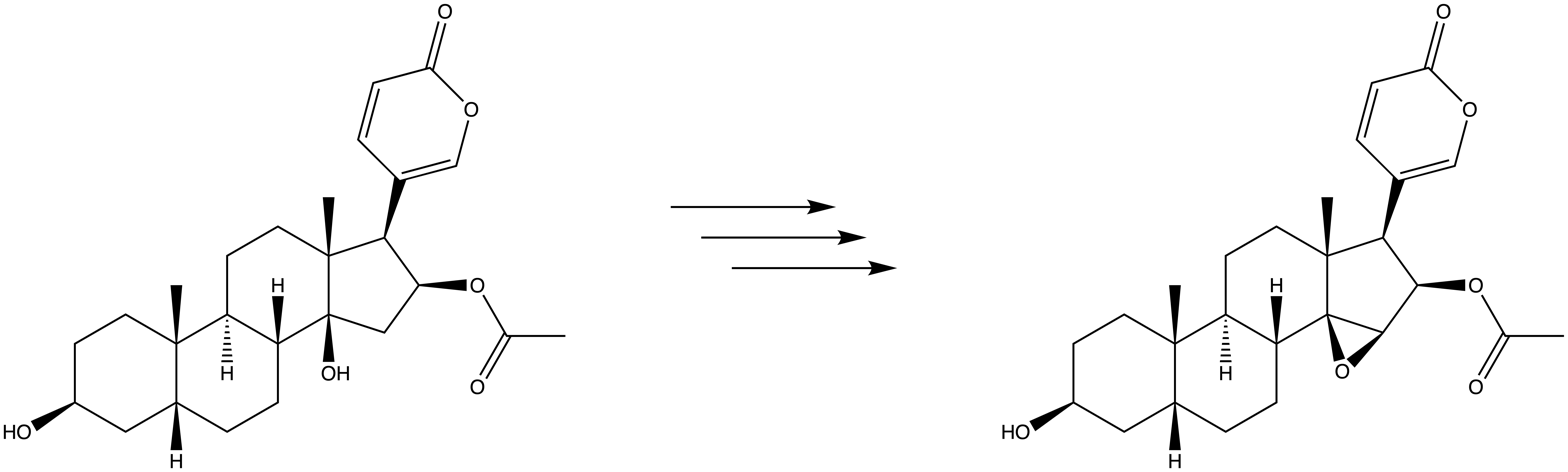
Transformation of bufotalin to cinobufagin

Two structurally similar bufagins can be utilized to develop a synthetic method, which is the transformation of bufotalin to cinobufagin. Cinobufagin is known for its potential as the precursor of many anti-tumor drugs and bufotalin is an important venom found within the cane toad. This synthesis method involves 6 steps.

== Effects of bufagins ==
Some bufagins have effects similar to poisoning by digitalis, having effects on the cardiac muscle, causing ventricular fibrillation. Some also have local anesthetic action. The analgesic effects have also been proven, by acting as Na+/K+-ATPase inhibitors on the binding sites of the cell membrane. The anti-cancer properties in leukemia and melanoma cells, and the inhibition of the proliferation of prostate cancer cells, have also been investigated in cellular models. Some of the bufagin toxins are used in low doses in traditional Chinese medicine for similar applications as digoxin is used for in Western medicine (i.e. treatment of heart conditions such as atrial fibrillation).

These bufagins, and especially cinobufagin, have given rise to a large number of derivatives evaluated as potential anti-tumor drugs.
