= Bufotoxin =

Class of chemical compounds

Bufotoxins are a family of toxic steroid lactones or substituted tryptamines of which some are toxic. They occur in the parotoid glands, skin, and poison of many toads (Bufonidae family) and other amphibians, and in some plants and mushrooms. The exact composition varies greatly with the specific source of the toxin.

== Composition ==
Chemical structure of one of the main components of bufotoxin, a conjugate of bufagin with suberylarginine. This component is itself sometimes called bufotoxin.

Bufotoxins can contain 5-MeO-DMT, bufagins, bufalin, bufotalin, bufotenin, bufothionine, dehydrobufotenine, epinephrine, norepinephrine, and serotonin. Some authors have also used the term bufotoxin to describe the conjugate of a bufagin with suberylarginine.

The toxic substances found in toads can be divided by chemical structure in two groups:

1. bufadienolides, which are cardiac glycosides (e.g., bufotalin, bufogenin), are compounds that may be fatal if consumed.
2. tryptamine-related substances (e.g., bufotenin), are sought after for entheogenic and/or recreational purposes by some individuals. However, the practice of using these substances derived from animals for spiritual experiences or responsible drug use may raise ethical concerns about the potential suffering inflicted on the animal.

== Species ==
Toads known to secrete bufotoxins.

=== Toads frequently "milked" ===
Despite being a frequent target for milking, these toads still carry cardiotoxic bufotoxins which have been linked to deaths.

- 5-HO-DMT (bufotenin)
  - Incilius alvarius (formerly Bufo alvarius)
  - Rhinella arenarum
  - Rhinella diptycha
  - Nannophryne variegata
  - Melanophryniscus moreirae
  - Rana dalmativa
- 5-MeO-DMT
  - Incilius alvarius (formerly Bufo alvarius)

=== Other toads ===
The effects of the bufotoxins in these toads are not well understood.

- Anaxyrus americanus
- Bufo bufo
- Bufo melanostictus
- Rhinella marina (formerly Bufo marinus)

== Extraction ==
Extract from the skin of certain Asian toads, such as Bufo bufo gargarizans and Bufo melanostictus, is often found in certain Chinese folk remedies. The Pharmacopoeia of the People's Republic of China (ChP) considers the two species valid sources of toad poison (Chinese: 蟾酥; pinyin: Chánsū; Latin: bufonis venenum), and requires the dry product to contain at least 6% of cinobufagin and resibufogenin combined by weight. The extract is obtained by squeezing the parotoid glands of caught, washed toads for a white venom and drying; the final dried poison is usually brown, with a chunk or flake form.

== Human poisoning ==
Poisoning from toad toxin is rare but can kill. It can occur when someone drinks toad soup, eats toad meat or toad eggs, or swallows live toads. It can also happen when someone deliberately takes commercial substances made with toad toxins. These go under names including "Kyushin", "Chan Su" (marketed as a painkiller, topical anesthetic, or cardiac treatment), "Rockhard", and "Love Stone" (marketed as aphrodisiacs).

"Chan Su" (literally "toad venom") is often adulterated with standard painkillers, such as paracetamol, promethazine, and diclofenac. It may be ingested or injected.

=== Symptoms of intoxication ===
Symptoms may vary depending on certain factors such as the size and age of the victim. Other than the first, more benign symptoms (such as a tingling or burning sensation in the eyes, mucous membranes, or in exposed wounds), the most frequently described symptoms in the medical literature are:

- paleness
- bradycardia
- cardiac arrhythmia (including ventricular and atrial fibrillation)
- bundle branch block
- hypotension
- dyspnea
- tachypnea
- hallucination
- blurred vision
- paralysis (starting at extremities)
- hypersalivation
- diarrhea
- vomiting
- anaphylactic shock
- loss of consciousness
- respiratory arrest
- cardiac arrest

One epileptic episode caused by bufotoxins was observed in a five-year-old child, minutes after they had placed a Bufo alvarius in their mouth. The child was successfully treated with diazepam and phenobarbital.

In extreme cases following ingestion of mucus or skin of the toad, death generally occurs within 6 and 24 hours. Victims surviving past 24 hours generally will recover.
