= Arenobufagin =

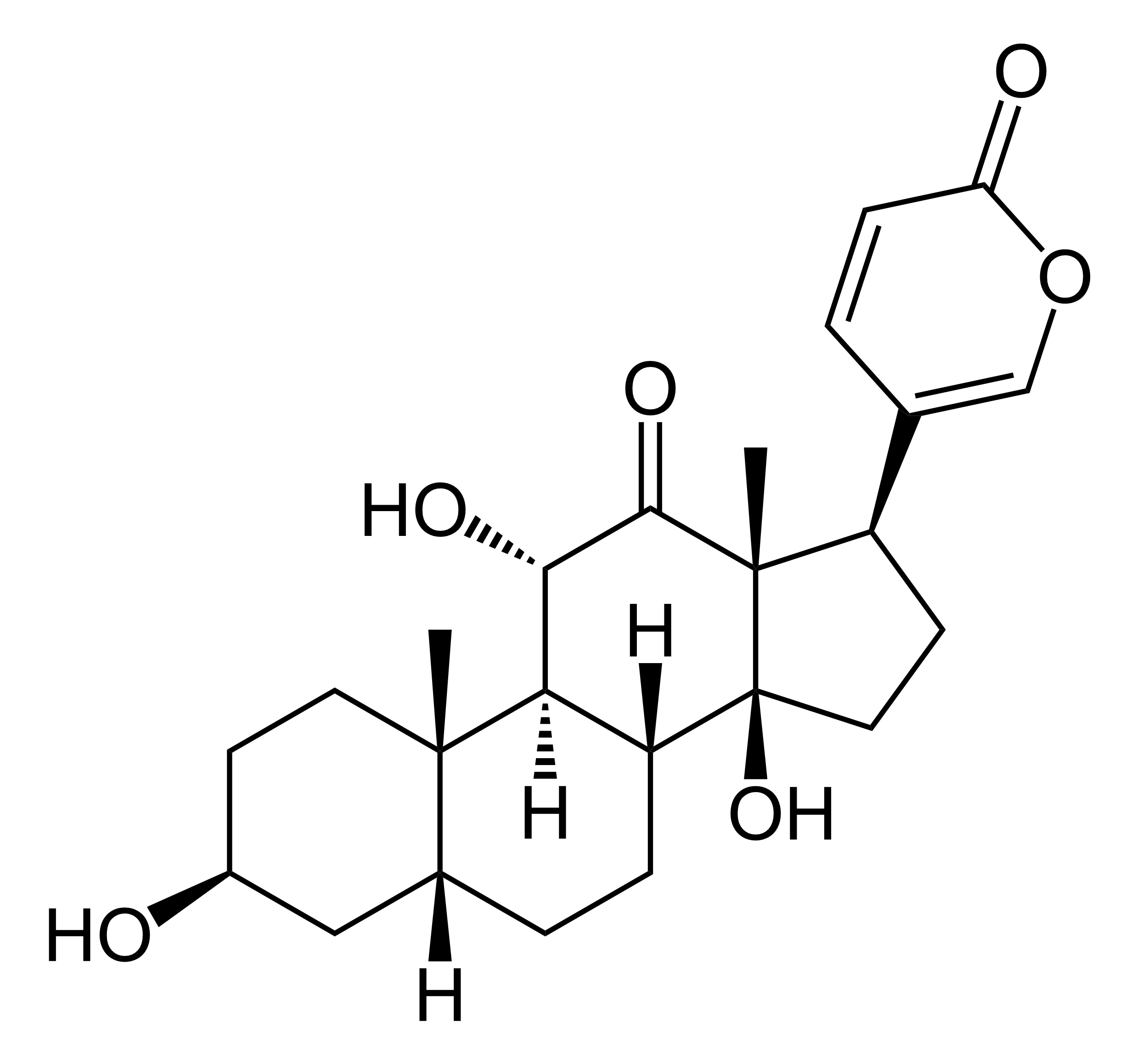

Names
- IUPAC name 5-[(3S,5R,10S,11S,13R,14S,17R)-3,11,14-trihydroxy-10,13-dimethyl-12-oxo-2,3,4,5,6,7,8,9,11,15,16,17-dodecahydro-1H-cyclopenta[a]phenanthren-17-yl]pyran-2-one
- Other names Arenobufagin

Identifiers
CAS Number	464-74-4
3D model (JSmol)	Interactive image
ChemSpider	20051196
PubChem CID	10051
UNII	27R42QLM25
CompTox Dashboard (EPA)	DTXSID00963565
- InChI: InChI=1S/C24H32O6/c1-22-9-7-15(25)11-14(22)4-5-17-19(22)20(27)21(28)23(2)16(8-10-24(17,23)29)13-3-6-18(26)30-12-13/h3,6,12,14-17,19-20,25,27,29H,4-5,7-11H2,1-2H3/t14-,15+,16-,17-,19-,20+,22+,23+,24+/m1/s1 Key: JGDCRWYOMWSTFC-AZGSIFHYSA-N
- SMILES: C[C@]12CC[C@@H](C[C@H]1CCC3C2[C@@H](C(=O)[C@]4([C@@]3(CC[C@@H]4C5=COC(=O)C=C5)O)C)O)O

Properties
Chemical formula	C_{24}H_{32}O_{6}
Molar mass	416.514 g·mol^{−1}
Appearance	liquid
Density	1.4±0.1 g/cm3
Boiling point	637.2±55.0 °C at 760 mmHg
Vapor pressure	0.0±4.3 mmHg at 25 °C
Refractive index (n_{D})	1.622

Hazards
- Occupational safety and health (OHS/OSH)
Main hazards	Cardiotoxic
- GHS labelling
Pictograms	(GHS06: Toxic)
Signal word	Danger
Flash point	219.3±25.0 °C
- Except where otherwise noted, data are given for materials in their standard state (at 25 °C [77 °F], 100 kPa). verify (what is ?) Infobox references

Arenobufagin is a cardiotoxic bufanolide steroid secreted by the Argentine toad Bufo arenarum. It has effects similar to digitalis, blocking the Na+/K+ pump in heart tissue.

== Sources ==
The compound arenobufagin is one of the major components of certain toad toxins. It is derived from the dried skin of giant toads, such as Bufo gargarizans and Bufo melanostictus Suhneider. Arenobufagin is specifically secreted by Rhinella arenarum, which is found in South America. The toxin of these toad species contains about 1.75% of arenobufagin. The other major part of the venom consists mostly of similar looking bufagins, which are all toxic steroids. Toads produce their toxin when they are scared, injured, or provoked, as a defense mechanism against being eaten by their predators.

== History ==
Arenobufagin is a component of a certain toad toxin which goes by the name of Chan’su. For centuries, this toxin has been used in Chinese traditional medicine in the treatment of liver cancer. Also, it is reported to have a stimulative effect upon the heart. It is derived from the dried skin secretions of certain toads. In a 2013 study, it was shown that arenobufagin inhibits the growth of certain liver tumor cells. In fact, this compound showed the most potent antitumor activity of fifteen bufadionolides isolated from Chan’su.

== Function in medicine ==
Arenobufagin has been widely used in traditional Chinese medicine (TCM) to attempt to treat carcinogenesis, since it inhibits cell growth in several cancer cells. It is one of the central active ingredients of toad toxin for this treatment. This happens both in purified form or in combination with other ingredients, which are mostly herbal components. Toad toxin is in fact still used in clinical practice in TCM to treat hepatocellular carcinoma (HCC). So far there is still little known about the anti-angiogenic properties of Arenobufagin. One study shows that Arenobufagin inhibits VEGF-induced endothial cell tube formation.

== Intake ==
Under normal circumstances, arenobufagin is a solid. In Chinese traditional medicine, it in ingested either orally or topically, for example to the skin. Little is known about its toxicokinetics.

== Toxicodynamics ==
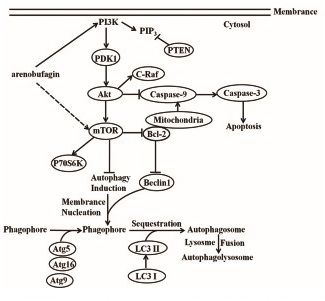
Proposed model of arenobufagin interactions

Arenobufagin is believed to play a role in the regulation of the transport of water and electrolytes across cell membranes under physiological conditions. Experimental results show that Arenobufagin inhibits the sodium-potassium adenosine triphosphatase (Na+/K+-ATPase) . It is one of the most potent blockers that are known to science, along with ouabain. It has been suggested that uncharged and non-polar amino acids may participate in the binding of arenobufagin to the extracellular surface of the ATPase. If this is the case, the steroid nucleus of arenobufagin probably also contributes to the binding. Furthermore, the presence of a sugar group in ouabain and the absence of one in arenobufagin suggests that it may me more lipophilic that ouabain and as such form a more stable complex with the Na+-K+ pump.

Besides its effects on the Na+-K+ pump, arenobufagin also has some other effects on cells, which were discovered in experiment with cancer cell lines. It causes apoptosis by tempering with mitochondria. In cells treated with it, a decreasing mitochondrial potential was detected (in a dose-dependent manner), as well as a high Bax/Bcl-2 ratio, which is associated with apoptosis, or programmed cell death. Bax translocation from cytosol to mitochondria was also found to be increased. In addition to these effects, arenobufagin also induces morphological changes in organelles, blebbing of plasma membrane, shrinkage of nuclear membrane and chromatin condensation. These observation also indicate the occurrence of apoptosis. Last but not least, specific cleavage of poly (ADP-ribose) polymerase (PARP) and a decrease in pro-caspase9 and 3 were also induced by arenobufagin treatment. PARP is mainly involved in cell repair and programmed cell death. After treatment with arenobufagin, some cells make more autophagosomes and lysosomes, whereas other cells undergo apoptosis. Arenobufagin also leads to increased expression of LC3-II, Biclin1(initial vesicle formation), Atg5 (elongation and completion), Atg9, Atg16L1 and p62/SQSTM1, all proteins which induce autophagy. Blockers of autophagy increase the cytotoxic effect of arenobufagin. Addition of 3-MA increases the proportion of cells in which there in enlarged PARP cleavage and limited caspase-9 and caspase-3 cleavage. This indicates that autophagy pathways protect the cell against apoptosis by arenobufagin. It was hypothesized that arenobufagin may inhibit the PI3K/Akt pathway in controlling cell death and differentiation in response to external stimuli. It was found that arenobufagin inhibited the proteins Akt, PDK1 and PI3K, whereas it stimulated the PHEN-protein. It does this by altering the degree of phosphorylation. All these proteins are involved in the PI3/Akt pathway. Further down the pathway, arenobufagin indirectly inhibits the mTOR-protein, which is involved in apoptosis as well as in autophagy.

The biotransformation of arenobufagin by Alternaria alternata leads to the following three metabolites: 3-oxo-arenobufagin (1a), ψ-bufarenogin (1b), and 3- oxo- ψ-bufarenogin (1c). The biotransformation processes consists of a main reaction whereas the dehydrogenation of the 3-hydroxyl group takes place. This process is followed by isomerization.

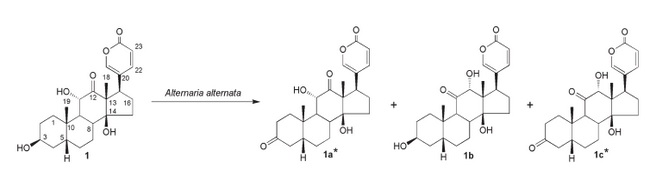

== Similar forms ==
Arenobufagin is a derivative of the so-called bufadienolides, where it also has a steroid structure. A characteristic of bufadienolides is that they all contain two double bonds in the lactone ring.

== Symptoms ==
=== Circulatory system ===
Arenobufagin works like cardiac glycosides. It inhibits the sodium-potassium pump because it stabilises the E2-P transition state, in which the pump is inactive. Second membrane transporter NCX is responsible for 3Na/Ca transport, if the Na-K-Pump does not function correctly the Ca concentration inside the cell will rise and this will cause heart failure. However, in experiments concerning the anti-cancer effects of arenobufagin in mice, no negative effects where found.

=== Digestive system ===
Arenobufagin has shown to cause appoptose in hepatocellular carcinoma cells in mice, although this method is not used to cure hepatocellular carcinoma in modern human medicine.

== Structure-activity relationships ==
There is a rather large homology in structure between arenobufagin and cardiac glycosides. Cardiac glycosides are natural compounds found in plants which cause inactivation of the sodium potassium pump like arenobufagin. The specific steroidic structure binds to the pump in a way it inhibits the process of pumping potassium into the cell and sodium out of the cell. The exact way of binding to the Na-K-Pump is not yet documented.

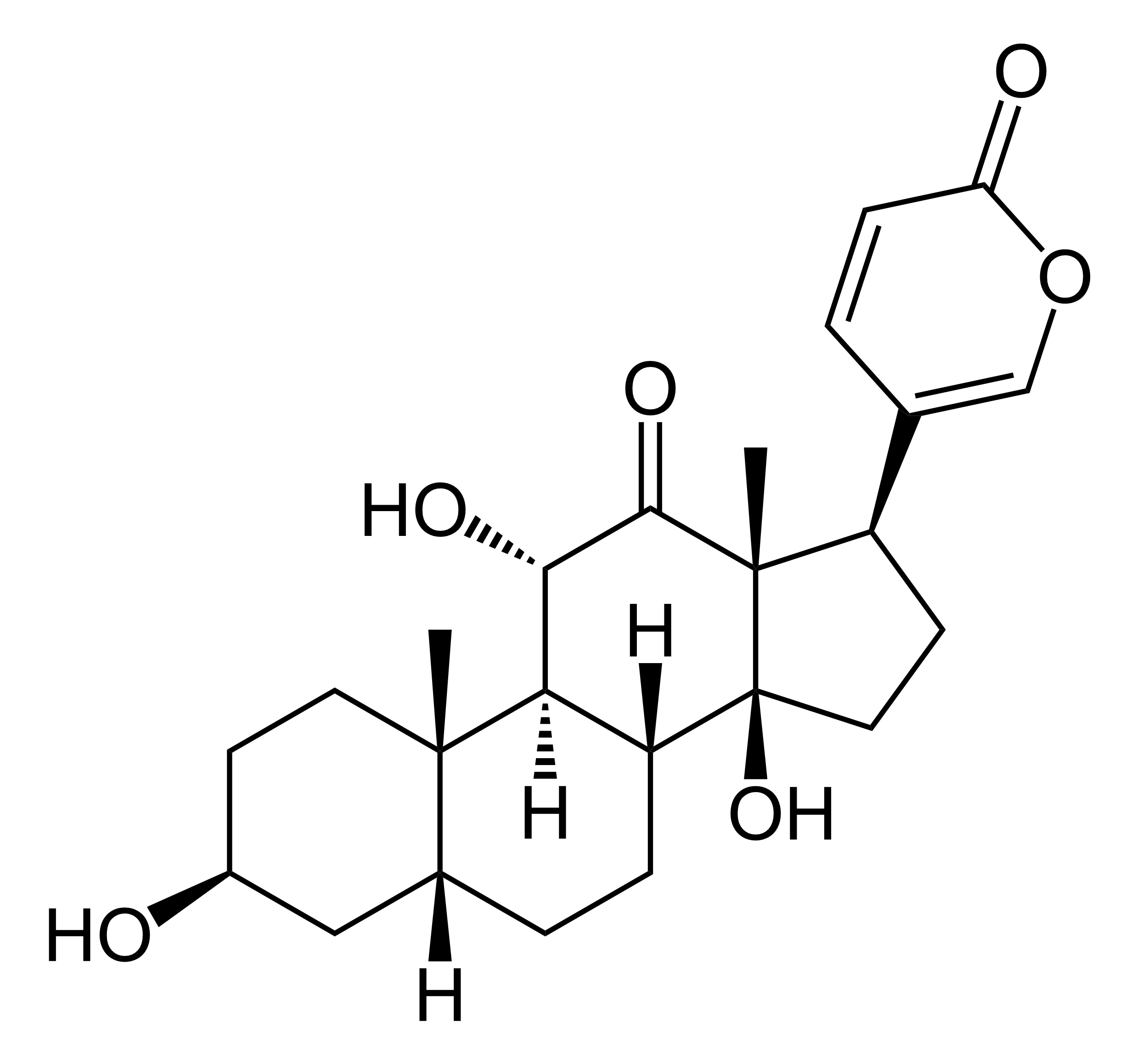
Structure of arenobufagin

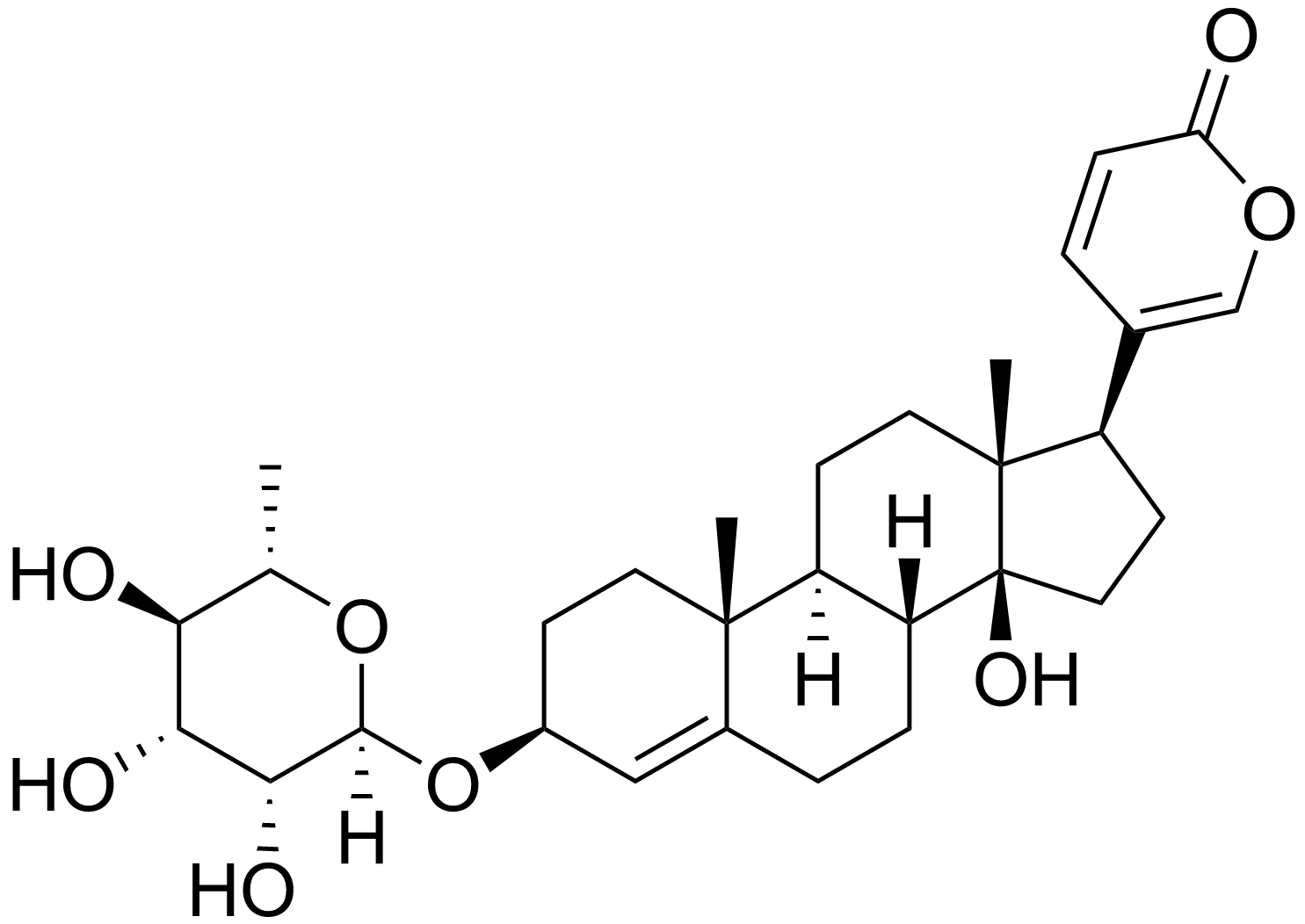
Structure of a cardiac glycoside, proscillaridin

== Toxicity ==
=== Acute toxicity ===
Although a low dosis of arenobufagin can be used as a medicine to treat heart rate problems, a high dose can lead to acute heart problems and even death. Arenobufagin is also toxic for hepatocellular carcinoma cells, which is a positive result for the body.

=== Chronic exposure ===
Toxicity because of chronic exposure was not clearly documented thus far. However it is discussed that the chronic exposure to this compound can cause the development of tumors.

== See also ==
- Bufagin
- Bufadienolide
- Cinobufagin
- Gamabufagin
- Marinobufagin
- Quercicobufagin
- Regularobufagin
- Vallicepobufagin
- Viridibufagin
- Digitalis
