= Resibufogenin =

Steroid lactone, mostly found in skin venom glands of toads

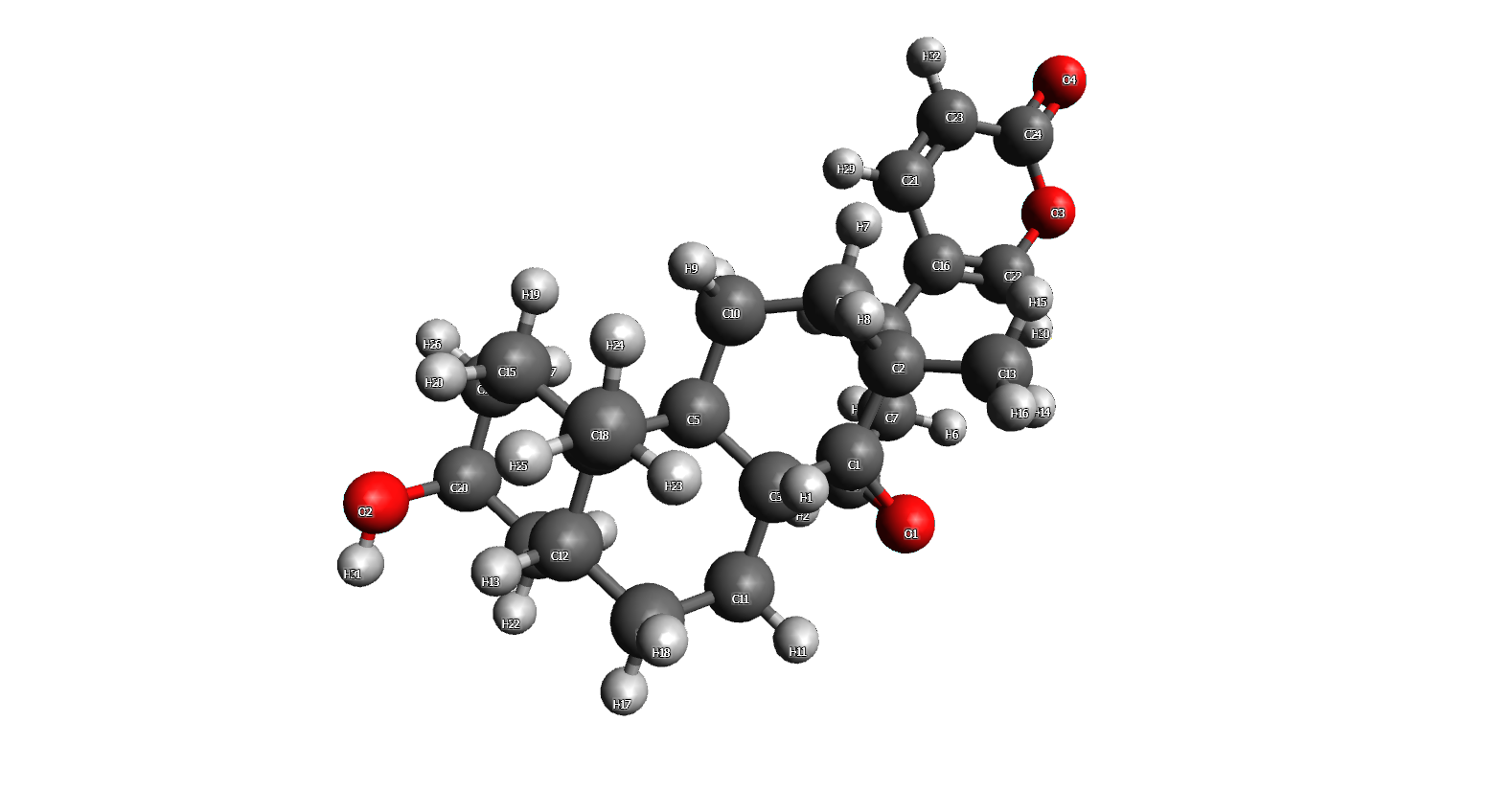

Clinical data
- Other names: Resibufogenin

Pharmacokinetic data
- Bioavailability: Low
- Metabolism: Liver
- Excretion: Biliary

Identifiers
- IUPAC name: 5-[(1R,2S,4R,6R,7R,10S,11S,14S,16R)-14-hydroxy-7,11-dimethyl-3-oxapentacyclo[8.8.0.02,4.02,7.011,16]octadecan-6-yl]pyran-2-one
- CAS Number: 465-39-4
- PubChem CID: 6917974
- ChemSpider: 5293192
- UNII: 3K654P2M4J
- KEGG: D01378
- ChEBI: CHEBI:31319
- ChEMBL: ChEMBL250172
- CompTox Dashboard (EPA): DTXSID0046808

Chemical and physical data
- Formula: C_{24}H_{32}O_{4}
- Molar mass: 384.516 g·mol^{−1}
- 3D model (JSmol): Interactive image
- SMILES: C[C@]12CC[C@@H](C[C@H]1CC[C@@H]3[C@@H]2CC[C@]4([C@]35[C@H](O5)C[C@@H]4C6=COC(=O)C=C6)C)O
- InChI: InChI=InChI=1S/C24H32O4/c1-22-9-7-16(25)11-15(22)4-5-18-17(22)8-10-23(2)19(12-20-24(18,23)28-20)14-3-6-21(26)27-13-14/h3,6,13,15-20,25H,4-5,7-12H2,1-2H3/t15-,16+,17+,18-,19-,20-,22+,23-,24-/m1/s1; Key:ATLJNLYIJOCWJE-CWMZOUAVSA-N

Resibufogenin (RBG), also known as bufogenin, is a cardiotonic (cardiac stimulant) steroid synthesized in the venom glands of certain toads, particularly those belonging to the Bufonidae family. It contains a lactone ring, and hence is classified as a bufadienolide. The cardiotonic activity of resibufogenin is attributed to its structural similarity to cardiac glycosides, such as digoxin.

For centuries, it has been used to treat diseases. Furthermore, modern studies, both experimental and clinical, support the use of toad venom for treatment of inflammatory diseases and cancer. The compound has also shown potential in oncology and respiratory medicine.

The use of resibufogenin dates back to traditional Chinese medicine. Resibufogenin is the main glycoside in the Chinese medicine Chan Su. It has been used for its cardiotonic effects and as a potential treatment for tumors and heart-related conditions. It has also been used for lighter conditions, such as sore throats, sunstroke, abdominal pain or diarrhea. The practice of using toad secretions as treatment dates back to the Tang Dynasty (618-907 BC). It is also known in Japan, under the name of Senso. Although toad venom consists of a number of different components which all have distinct functions, it is well known that bufadienolides are the main bioactive compounds in toad toxins. This is partly due to their unique steroid structure.

Many studies have examined different species of toads and their therapeutic potential. Resibufogenin has been observed in the species B. melanosticus, B. marinus, and B. viridis. Other studies also mention B. garganizans.

== Biological effects ==
=== Anticancer ===
The anticancer effects of resibufogenin were found in different types of cancer cells. RBG acts by inducing apoptosis and inhibiting cell growth and proliferation in various types of cells. It can exert cytotoxic and inhibitory effects on cancers including gastric cancer, multiple myeloma, colon cancer, glioblastoma and breast cancer.

Cell death in colorectal cancer by RBG are attributed to necroptosis.RBG can also suppress growth and metastasis of the colorectal cancer cells through receptor-interacting protein kinase 3 necroptosis (RIPK3 necroptosis). Furthermore, RBG can induce G1 phase arrest in colorectal cancer cells by degradation of cyclin D1.

In glioblastoma, RBG can induce G2/M cell cycle arrest. The induced cell cycle arrest occurs through the downregulation of CDC25C and upregulation of p21. Both of these processes are caused by the activation of the MAPK/ERK pathway and an increase in intracellular calcium (Ca2+) stores. RBG also exhibits antitumor effects by inhibiting angiogenesis without any harmful toxicity. VEGFR2 pathway is an important pathway in the process of angiogenesis and leads to the endothelial cell proliferation and migration. It was found that RBG has inhibitory effects on the proliferation, migration and tube formation of human umbilical vein endothelial cells (HUVEC) by competitively inhibiting VEGFR2, as well as its downstream protein kinases FAK and Src in endothelial cells.

=== Anti-inflammatory ===
Recent studies demonstrated that RBG can have anti-inflammatory effects. In mice with endotoxemia, single intraperitoneal dose of RBG reduces pro-inflammatory cytokines such as tumour necrosis factor (TNF), interleukin-6 (IL-6) and chemoattractant protein (MCP)-1. The underlying molecular mechanisms of the inhibiting effect of RBG on the production of inflammatory cytokines was proposed to be through NF-κB signalling, hindering the phosphorylation of IκBα and preventing the nuclear release of NF-KB. Furthermore, RBG inhibits AP-1 mediated signaling by reducing phosphorylation of JNK and ERK. On top of this, RBG has suppressive effect on the production of iNOS by LPS-stimulated macrophages, inhibiting iNOS activity and decreasing its expression.

=== Cardiotonic effects ===
RBG is considered a cardiac glycoside, increasing output of the heart by acting on the cellular sodium-potassium ATPase pump. RBG was found to exert cardiotonic effects in animal experiments. RBG was found to increase ventricular contractile force by 34% in rabbits, and 36% in cats. In dogs, RBG can enhance ventricular contraction by up to 50%. It seems that RBG can increase the contractile force of cardiac muscle in dose-dependent manner.

=== Other effects ===
There are several reports indicating different types of pharmacological effects of RBG, including respiratory effects, effects on blood pressure and antiviral effects. RBG has an anti-viral effect on infections caused by Enterovirus 71 (EV71). This pathogen can infect hands, feet and mouth, ranging from mild symptoms to possible neurological disease with severe neural complications. RBG was reported to have an inhibitory effect on MERS infection caused by the Corona virus. RBG is also an efficient respiratory stimulator. Animal experiments reported RBG to have an increasing effect on respiratory volume, tidal volume and minute volume. Moreover, RBG has effects on blood pressure, enhancing cardiac output without impairing heart rate, and acting as a vasoconstrictor, both effects that were concluded to be the underlying mechanisms for RBG's positive effect on mean systemic arterial pressure in hemorrhaged animals. RBG can correct hypertension in animals, especially rats. It can act as an antagonist to marinobufagenin (MBG) . Both MBG and RBG are inhibitors of the Na+-K+ ATPase, but RBG seems to have an antagonistic effect on the actions of MBG, preventing MBG-induced hypertension and proteinuria. The effects of RBG on reducing blood pressure were observed in deoxycorticosterone acetate-salt hypertensive rats, but they were not observed in angiotensin infused rats, suggesting that RBG has a specific mechanism of action in specific causes for hypertension.

=== In animals ===
Increased ventricular contractile force by RBG has been shown in rabbits (by 34%), cats (by 36%) and adult mongrel dogs. RBG increases contractility of cardiac muscle in a dose-dependent manner.

In male mice, RBG has been found to potentially rejuvenate aging skin. Administration to aging mice increased dermal collagen density and subcutaneous fat, resulting in a more youthful phenotype. This probably occurs through selective induction of senescent cell apoptosis.

A study in male mice with glioblastoma has demonstrated that under treatment with resibufogenin, expression of a marker of proliferation Ki-67 was lower, and the expression of ATP1A1 was higher. This suggests that RBG exerts antitumor effects in male mice, by inhibiting the growth of the tumor cells through the targeting of Na^{+}/K^{+}-ATPase. RBG also prolongs the survival of mice with tumors.

Mice and rats are less sensitive to bufadienolides that dogs and humans. However, high doses (10 mg/kg) cause hypokinesia, deepened breathing, decreased heart rate, orthotunos, and death.

=== Protein targets ===
Target	Effect
NF‐κB	Suppression=apoptosis
CYP3A4	Induction
RIPK3	Induction= necroptosis
Cyclin D1	Suppression= G1 phase arrest
CDC25C	Downregulation = cell cycle arrest
p21	Upregulation = cell cycle arrest
Focal adhesion kinase (FAK) & Steroid receptor coactivator (Src)	Suppression= inhibition of vein endothelial cells
VEGFR	Inhibition= inhibiting angiogenesis
miR-143–3p/HK2 axis	Upregulation= antitumor activity
tumour necrosis factor, interleukin-6 and monocyte chemoattractant protein	Suppression= suppresses inflammatory response
Activator protein 1	Suppression
iNOS	Suppression= suppressing LPS-stimulated macrophage iNOS activity
marinobufagenin	Antagonistic effects by resibufogenin= preventing MBG-induced hypertension and proteinuria (only in rats)
Ki-67	Suppressed= decreased proliferation (antitumor effect)
ATP1A1	Induction= dysfunction Na/K pumpà inhibiting growth (antitumor)

== Metabolism ==
Resibufogenin is metabolized in the liver microsomes. The metabolic reactions of RBG are hydroxylation, dihydroxylation, dehydrogenation and isomerization, yielding metabolites such as 3-epi-RBG, hydroxylated-RBG and dehydroxylated-RBG. The major metabolite of RBG phase I metabolism was proposed to be 5β-hydroxy-resibufogenin (5-HRB). 5-HRB, also called marinobufagenin, is a more polar and bioactive metabolite that was demonstrated to be the dominant metabolite of RBG metabolism in animals, including mice, dogs, guinea pigs, monkeys and humans. The reaction is mediated by CYP3A4.)

There seems to be interspecies differences in the preferred routes of RBG metabolism. In humans, monkeys, mouse, dogs and guinea pigs, 5 -hydroxylation is the important metabolic pathway in metabolism of RBG, whereas for rats, 3-O-epimerization is the main metabolic pathway in liver microsomes, generating a different dominant metabolite, called 3-epi-resibufogenin. Nine phase I metabolites were isolated from bile of rats, including 3-keto-resibufogenin, 3-epi-resibufogenin, 5β-hydroxy-3-epi-resibufogenin, 1α, 5β-dihydroxy- 3-epi-resibufogenin, 3α, 5β, 14α, 15β-tetrahydroxyl-bufa-20, 22-dienolide, 3α, 14α, 15β-trihydroxy-bufa-20, 22-dienolide, 3-epi-5β-hydroxy-bufalin, 12α, 16β-dihydroxy-3- epi-resibufogenin, and 5β, 16β-dihydroxy-3-epi-resibufogenin. The preferred site of hydroxylation was confirmed to be C-5. The final excretion pathway of RBG is billary, where hydroxylated metabolite of RBG is expelled. All of the metabolites were found to be less cytotoxic than the parent compound, indicating that hydroxylation, isomerization or epimerization of RBG follow a detoxication pathway in rat liver microsomes

== Side effects ==
RGB has been reported to have several side effects on the central nervous system (CNS), leading to shortness of breath, seizures, comas and cardiac arrythmia. For example, the electrophysiological effect of RBG, studied in various animal models, show that RBG induces reduction in the absolute value of resting potential and the maximum rise of the action potential. RBG also leads to shortening of the action potential duration and it decreases the amplitude of action potential, which was demonstrated both in vivo and in vitro. These mechanisms may be correlated to the side effects of Chan Su on the nervous system. It was found that at higher concentrations RBG has a toxic effect on mitral cells. It was also found that because RBG exerted the same effect on mitral cells as ouabain, the mechanism of action seems to be through ouabain-like effect, by inhibiting the Na+/K+ ATPase.

In addition, the major metabolite of RBG metabolism is known to be marinobufagenin (5-HRB). This is also one of the endogenously present metabolites of the mammalian bufadienolides. Marinobufagenin can affect the regulation of Na+/K+-ATPase activity and blood pressure, leading to arterial hypertension. There are reports about marinobufagenin being associated with increased incidence of proteinuria and preeclampsia in rats. Thus, as marinobufagenin is the major metabolite of RBG metabolism, administration of RBG to pregnant individuals may increase the risk of preeclampsia or make the condition worse. Extra care should be taken when administering RBG in the form of Chinese medicine to pregnant people or any other sensitive groups.

=== Cardiotoxicity ===
Between February 1993 and May 1995, the NYC Poison Control Center was informed about poisoning in five men, four of whom died after developing cardiac arrythmias. Reports have stated that the substance at fault contained bufodienolides, or that it was Chansu specifically. At high concentrations, RBG has been found to be toxic to the heart, by induction of delayed after depolarization and arrhythmia in cardiac fiber in vitro, and in a beating heart in vivo. With increasing doses, all parameters of action potential progressively decrease, including action potential amplitude, action potential duration at 50%, 75% and 90% of repolarization, maximum rate of rise of action potential and the resting potential. When delayed afterdepolarizations reach sufficient amplitude, they can induce extra or spontaneous action potentials, causing arrythmia.

== Chemistry ==
=== Structure and reactivity ===
Resibufogenin, a bufadienolide compound, exhibits a complex chemical structure with a molecular formula of C_{24}H_{32}O_{4} and a molecular weight of 384.5 g/mol. Its chemical structure is similar to digitoxigenin, featuring a pyran-2-one moiety within its steroid lactone framework. In terms of chemical reactivity, resibufogenin is unstable under strong acidic or alkaline conditions and undergoes rapid metabolism through processes like hydroxylation, dihydroxylation, dehydrogenation, and isomerization. The epoxide of resibufogenin is chemically reactive and likely contributes to its biological activity by influencing its interactions with cellular targets. Its metabolites, such as 5β-hydroxylated-resibufogenin, also have significant biological activity, including inhibitory effects on cell growth and induction of apoptosis. The compound can induce reactive oxygen species, apoptosis, and necroptosis.

=== Biosynthesis ===
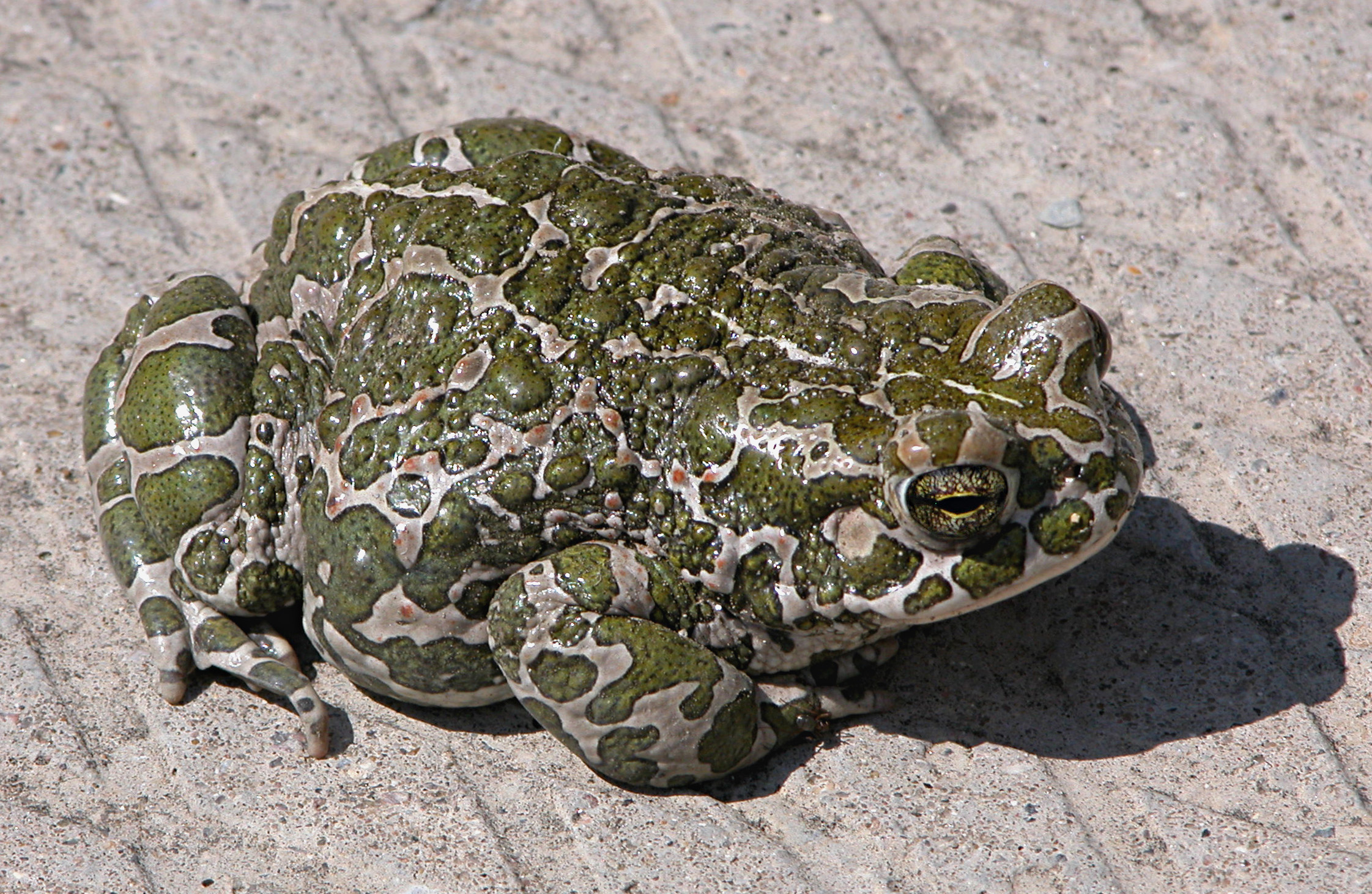
Bufo virdis toad (European Green Toad) can produce resibufogenin

Resibufogenin occurs naturally in plants and animals. It is produced in the parotid glands, skin, and poison of the Bufonidae toad family. In the toads, cholesterol is the precursor in the synthesis of resibufogenin. There is not much known about the ability of toads to synthesize these cardiotonic steroids and about the pathways and mechanisms of synthesis. Bufadienolides are transported by lipoproteins. The compound is taken up by a receptor-mediated mechanism which still remains unknown.

=== Laboratory synthesis ===
One study however has been successful in synthesizing resibufogenin from 14- dehydrobufalin which when oxidized, formed a 14a,15a-epoxide. The epoxide treated with sulfuric acid, opens the ring, introducing a hydroxyl group at the 15a-position. This step formed 15a-hydroxybufalin. The hydroxyl group was modified using methanesulfonyl chloride, facilitating an internal reaction forming a new oxygen bridge. This leads to the complete transformation into resibufogenin.
