= Zhang Tingdong =

Chinese doctor (1932–2025)

Zhang Tingdong (Chinese: 张亭栋; pinyin: Zhāng Tíngdòng; November 8, 1932 – March 21, 2025) was a Chinese medical scientist, pharmaceutical chemist, and educator at Harbin Medical University, 1st affiliated Hospital, and is best known for discovering of using arsenic trioxide to treat leukemia, which is regarded as a significant breakthrough of anti-leukemia medicine in the 20th Century and improvement in the lives of people with leukemia.

== Early life and education ==
Zhang was born November 8, 1932.

In 1950, Zhang graduated from Harbin Medical University. In 1963, he earned a doctorate degree in Traditional Chinese Medicine. Ever since, he has worked in the 1st Affiliated Hospital of Harbin Medical University, specializing in Hematology of Integrative of Chinese and Western Medicine

== Career ==
In March 1971, Han Taiyun of the 1st Affiliated Hospital started to treat cancer patients with a formula he collected from traditional Chinese medicine doctors. It was presumably an oral formula, and contained a mixture of many ingredients, including arsenic chemicals, mercury chloride, and cinobufagin venom toad. Later, Han Taiyun turned the formula into an intramuscular injection called "713" or "cancer spirit". For certain tumors, it worked and became a local hit. But Han Taiyun gave it up because the formula was too toxic for some patients, with side effects including renal toxicity and hypertension.

Zhang was a doctor of Traditional Chinese Medicine at First Clinical Hospital, affiliated with Harbin Medical University in Harbin, China.

In 1972, Zhang picked up Han Taiyun's work or started to cooperate with Han Taiyun to continue working on this formula. Instead of working on many cancers, Zhang Tingdong focused mainly on leukemia. Also, instead of using a mixture of many ingredients, Zhang Tingdong tested each individual component of the formula. He found that while the arsenic component is effective against leukemia, mercury chloride and cinobufagin venom toad were not, and caused renal toxicity and high blood pressure respectively. Their first paper was published in 1973, attributed to Zhang Ting, Pengfei Zhang, Wang Shouren, Han Taiyn at the Heilongjiang medical reports. They used "cancer injection" (also called "cancer spirit No. 1") in the treatment of 6 cases of patients with chronic myeloid leukemia. They used arsenic trioxide as the main ingredient, with some trace "pink powder (mercury chloride)". After the treatment, the 6 patients, including a chronic acute leukemia patient, experienced improved symptoms. They also mentioned that arsenic trioxide is effective in treating acute leukemia.

Zhang's results were initially published on Chinese-language literature. In the 1990s, he began to write in English, exposing this method to a broader scientific community. His work became widely known after 1996, when he co-authored a Blood article with Chen Zhu about this method.

== Death ==
Zhang died on March 21, 2025, at the age of 92.

== Awards ==
- State Science and Technology Award, 2nd grade.
- A "DuPont Science and Technology Award", according to Chinese sources.
- China Patent Award.
- An "International Patent Award", according to Chinese sources.
- 2011 Outstanding Achievement in Life Sciences (生命科学杰出成就奖). Presented by GSK China.
- 2015 Outstanding Scientist Award. Presented by Hong Kong Qiu Shi Science and Technologies Foundation.
- 2020 Future Science Prize, Life Science Prize (private organization based in China.)
- 2021 Asian Scientist 100, Asian Scientist
