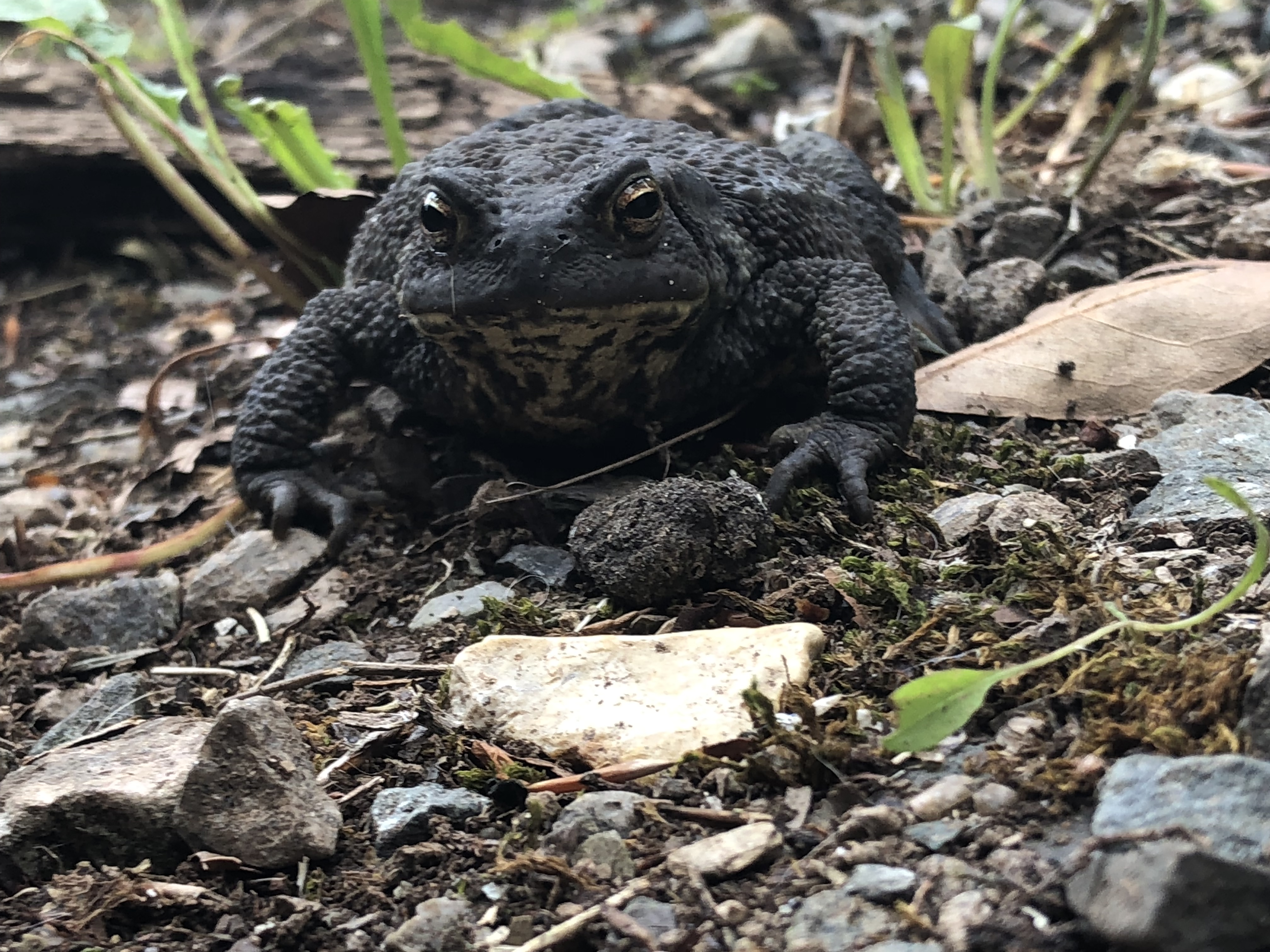

Conservation status
- Least Concern (IUCN 3.1)

Scientific classification
- Kingdom: Animalia
- Phylum: Chordata
- Class: Amphibia
- Order: Anura
- Family: Bufonidae
- Genus: Bufo
- Species: B. bufo

Binomial name
- Bufo bufo (Linnaeus, 1758)
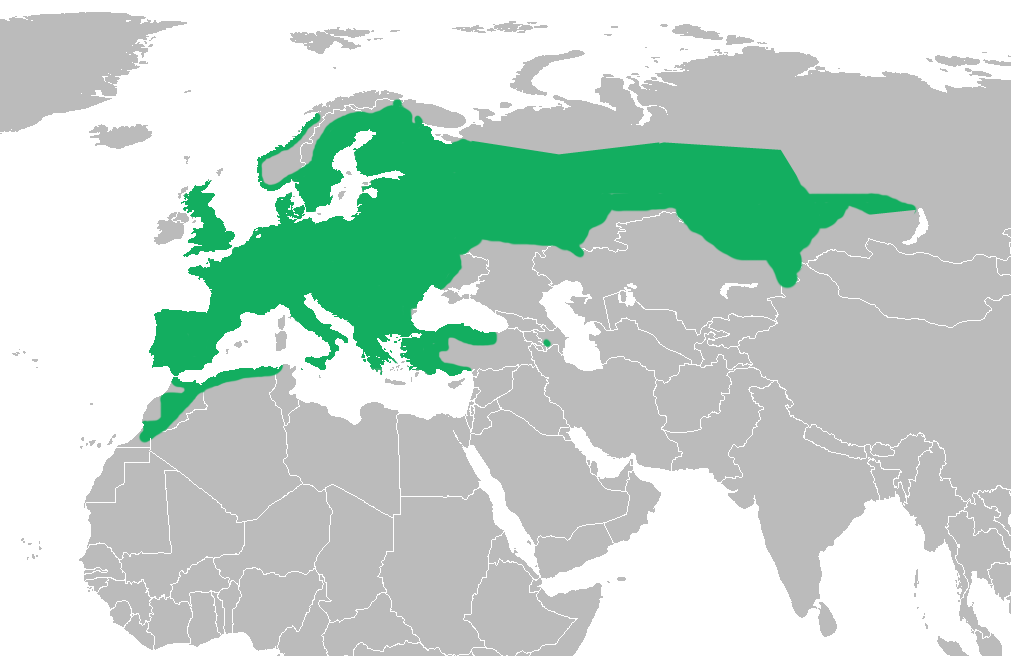
- Range map of common toad

Synonyms
- List: Bufo (Bufo) bufo Dubois and Bour, 2010; Bufo (Bufo) grediscola Dubois and Bour, 2010; Bufo Roeselii Daudin, 1802; Bufo Rouselei Latreille, 1801; Bufo alpinus Schinz, 1833; Bufo bufo bufo Poche, 1912; Bufo bufo gredosicola Müller and Hellmich, 1935; Bufo carbunculus Bonaparte, 1835; Bufo cinereus var. hybridus Koch, 1872; Bufo cinereus var. medius Koch, 1872; Bufo cinereus var. minor Koch, 1872; Bufo cinereus Schneider, 1799; Bufo communis Bruch, 1862; Bufo communis Günther, 1859; Bufo commutatus Steenstrup, 1846; Bufo ferruginosus Risso, 1826; Bufo minutus Schinz, 1833; Bufo palmarum Cuvier, 1829; Bufo rubeta var. robustior Lataste, 1880; Bufo rubeta Schneider, 1799; Bufo spelaeus Rivière, 1886; Bufo tuberculosus Risso, 1826; Bufo ventricosus Bonnaterre, 1789; Bufo ventricosus Laurenti, 1768; Bufo vinearum Lesson, 1841; Bufo vulgaris cinereus Lataste, 1880; Bufo vulgaris var. acutirostris Lessona, 1877; Bufo vulgaris var. obtusirostris Lessona, 1877; Bufo vulgaris Laurenti, 1768; Pegaeus bufo Gistel, 1868; Rana (Bufo) vulgaris Guérin-Méneville, 1838; Rana Bufo Linnaeus, 1758

Audio
- Common toad calls, recorded in Radnor, Wales

= Common toad =

Species of amphibian

The common toad, also known as European toad or simply the toad in Anglophone parts of Europe (Bufo bufo, from Latin bufo "toad"), is a toad found throughout most of Europe (excluding Iceland, Ireland, parts of Scandinavia, and some Mediterranean islands), western North Asia and a small part of Northwest Africa. It belongs to a group of closely related species descended from a common ancestral line of toads and forming a species complex. The toad is an inconspicuous animal, usually lying hidden during the day. It becomes active at dusk, hunting the invertebrates on which it feeds at night. It moves with a slow, ungainly walk or by jumping short distances, and has greyish-brown skin covered with wart-like lumps.

Although toads are usually solitary animals, large numbers of them converge on certain breeding ponds during the breeding season, where the males compete to mate with the females. The females lay their eggs in gelatinous strings in the water, which later hatch into tadpoles. After several months of growth and development, the tadpoles sprout limbs and undergo metamorphosis to become tiny toads. The juveniles then leave the water and remain largely terrestrial for the rest of their lives.

The common toad appears to be in decline in some areas, but is currently classified as being of "least concern" on the IUCN Red List of Threatened Species. It is under threat due to habitat loss, particularly the drainage of its breeding grounds, and some toads are killed on roads during their annual migrations. The toad has long been associated with witchcraft in popular culture and literature.

== Taxonomy ==
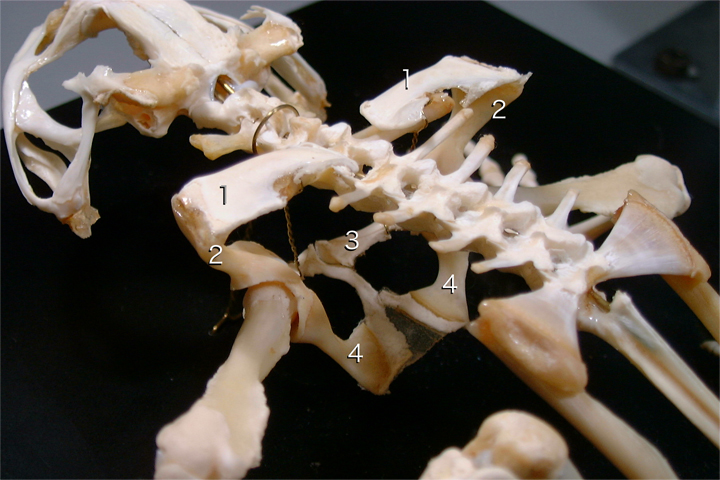
Skeleton showing shoulder girdle; 1: suprascapula, 2: scapula, 3: clavicle, 4: procoracoid

The common toad was first given the name Rana bufo by the Swedish biologist Carl Linnaeus in the 10th edition of Systema Naturae in 1758. In this work, he placed all the frogs and toads in the single genus Rana. It later became apparent that this genus should be divided, and in 1768, the Austrian naturalist Josephus Nicolaus Laurenti placed the common toad in the genus Bufo, naming it Bufo bufo. The toads in this genus are included in the family Bufonidae, the true toads.

Various subspecies of B. bufo have been recognised over the years. The Caucasian toad is found in the mountainous regions of the Caucasus and was at one time classified as B. b. verrucosissima. It has a larger genome and differs from B. bufo morphologically and is now accepted as Bufo verrucosissimus. The spiny toad was classified as B. b. spinosus. It is found in France, the Iberian Peninsula and the Maghreb and grows to a larger size and has a spinier skin than its more northern counterparts with which it intergrades. It is now accepted as Bufo spinosus. The Gredos toad, B. b. gredosicola, is restricted to the Sierra de Gredos, a mountain range in central Spain. It has exceptionally large paratoid glands and its colour tends to be blotched rather than uniform. It is now considered to be a synonym of Bufo spinosus.

B. bufo is part of a species complex, a group of closely related species that cannot be clearly demarcated. Several modern species are believed to form an ancient group of related taxa from preglacial times. These are the spiny toad (B. spinosus), the Caucasian toad (B. verrucosissimus) and the Japanese common toad (B. japonicus). The European common toad (Bufo bufo) seems to have arisen more recently. It is believed that the range of the ancestral form extended into Asia but that isolation between the eastern and western species complexes occurred as a result of the development of the Central Asian Deserts during the Middle Miocene. The exact taxonomic relationships between these species remains unclear. A serological investigation into toad populations in Turkey undertaken in 2001 examined the blood serum proteins of Bufo verrucosissimus and Bufo spinosus. It found that the differences between the two were not significant and that therefore the former should be synonymized with the latter.

A study published in 2012 examined the phylogenetic relationships between the Eurasian and North African species in the Bufo bufo group and indicated a long evolutionary history for the group. Nine to thirteen million years ago, Bufo eichwaldi, a recently described species from south Azerbaijan and Iran, split from the main lineage. Further divisions occurred with Bufo spinosus splitting off about five million years ago when the Pyrenees were being uplifted, an event which isolated the populations in the Iberian Peninsula from those in the rest of Europe. The remaining European lineage split into Bufo bufo and Bufo verrucosissimus less than three million years ago during the Pleistocene. Very occasionally the common toad hybridizes with the natterjack toad (Epidalea calamita) or the European green toad (Bufotes viridis).

== Description ==
The common toad can grow to around 15 cm (6 in) in length. Females are usually stockier than males, and southern specimens tend to be larger than northern ones. Its head is broad, with a wide mouth below the terminal snout, which has two small nostrils. There are no teeth. The bulbous, protruding eyes have yellow or copper-coloured irises and horizontal, slit-shaped pupils. Just behind the eyes are two bulging regions: the paratoid glands, which are positioned obliquely. These glands secrete a noxious substance called bufotoxin, which is used to deter potential predators. The head joins the body without a noticeable neck, and there is no external vocal sac. The broad. squat body is positioned close to the ground. The forelimbs are short, with the toes of the front feet turning inwards.

During the breeding season, the male develops nuptial pads on his first three fingers. He uses these to grasp the female during mating. Its hind legs are shorter than those of other frogs and its hind feet have long, unwebbed toes. There is no tail. The skin is dry and covered in small, wart-like lumps. It is a fairly uniform shade of brown, olive-brown or greyish-brown, and is sometimes partly blotched or banded with a darker shade. The common toad tends to be sexually dimorphic, with the females being browner and the males greyer. The underside is a dirty white speckled with grey and black patches.

Other species that could be confused with the common toad include the natterjack toad (Bufo calamita) and the European green toad (Bufo viridis). The former is usually smaller and has a yellow band running down its back, whereas the latter has a distinctive mottled pattern. The paratoid glands of both species run parallel to each other, rather than slanting as in the common toad. The common frog (Rana temporaria) is also similar in appearance but it has a less rounded snout, damp smooth skin, and usually moves by leaping.

Common toads can live for many years and have survived for fifty years in captivity. In the wild, common toads are thought to live for about ten to twelve years. Their age can be determined by counting the number of annual growth rings in the bones of their phalanges.

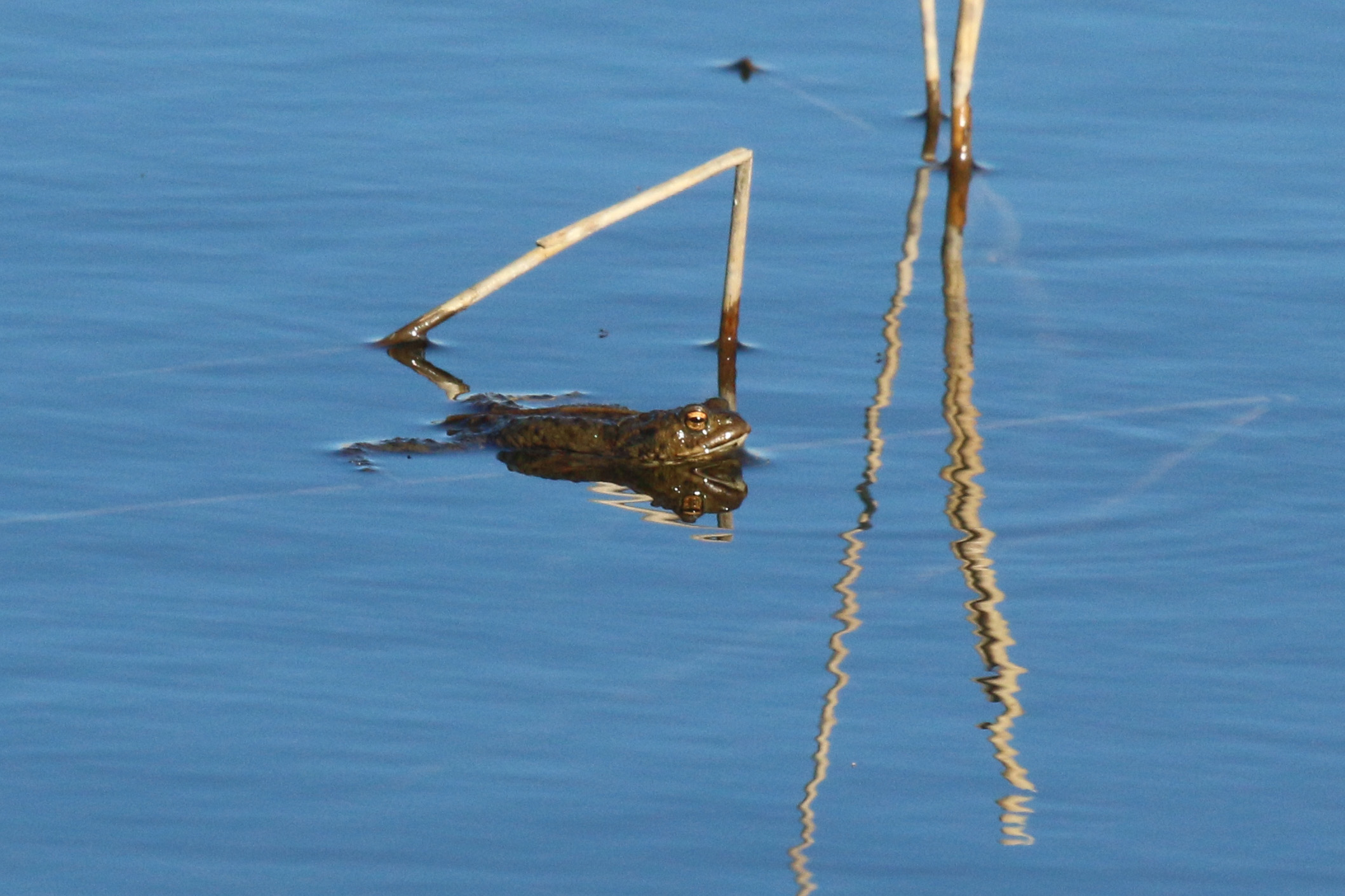
Swimming, Otmoor, Oxfordshire

In a pond Burgwald, Germany

== Distribution and habitat ==
After the common frog (Rana temporaria), the edible frog (Pelophylax esculentus) and the smooth newt (Lissotriton vulgaris), the common toad is the fourth most common amphibian in Europe. It is found throughout the continent except in Iceland, the cold northern parts of Scandinavia, and a number of Mediterranean islands. These include Malta, Crete, Corsica, Sardinia and the Balearic Islands. It has been introduced to a number of places in Ireland, and appears to be thriving. Its easterly range extends to Irkutsk in Siberia and its southerly range includes parts of northwestern Africa in the northern mountain ranges of Morocco, Algeria and Tunisia. A closely related variant lives in eastern Asia including Japan. The common toad is found at altitudes of up to 2,500 metres (8,200 ft) in the southern part of its range. It is largely found in forested areas with coniferous, deciduous and mixed woodland, especially in wet locations. It also inhabits open countryside, fields, copses, parks and gardens, and is often found in dry areas far from standing water.

== Behaviour and lifecycle ==
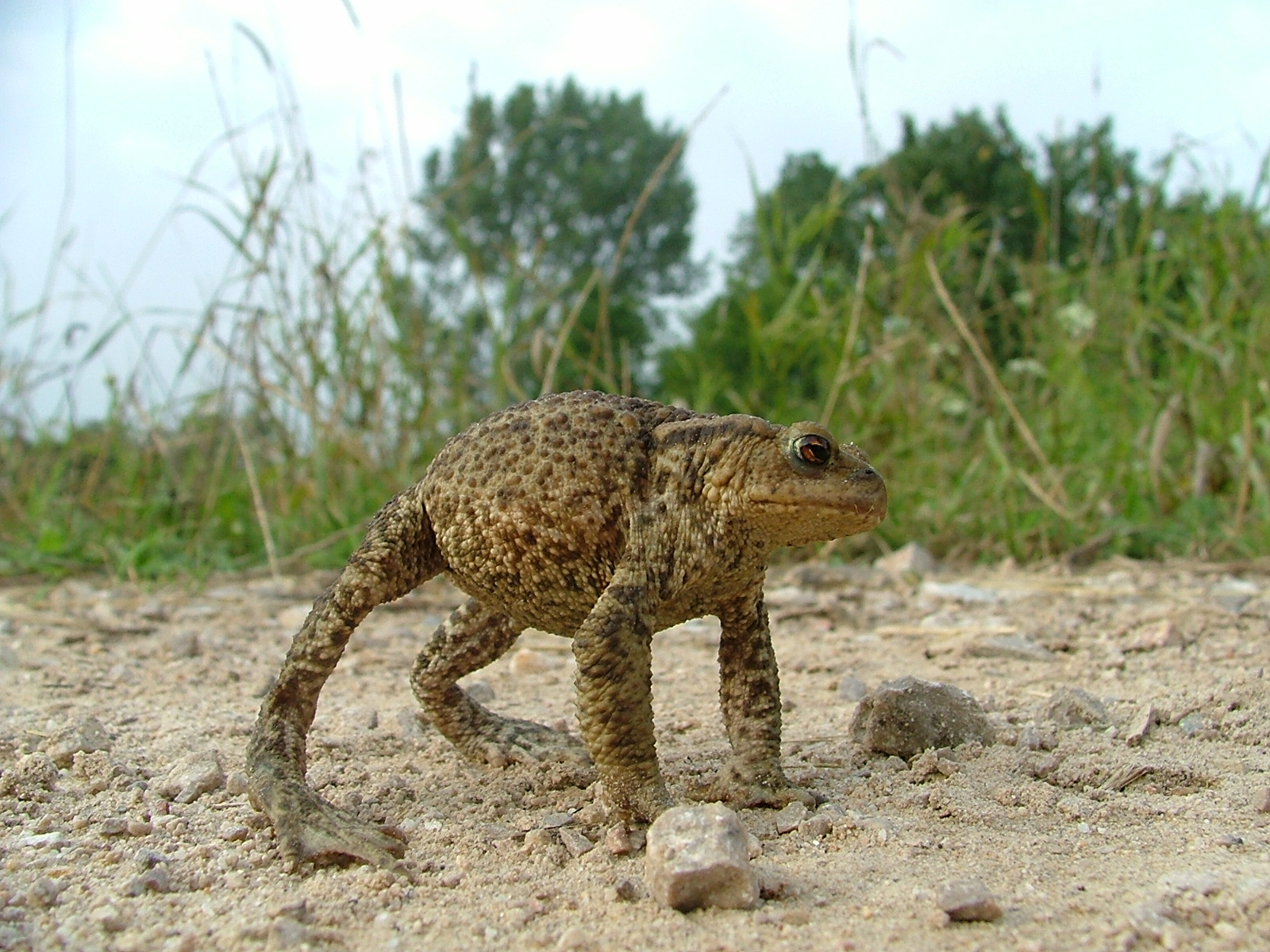
A common toad adopts a defensive stance

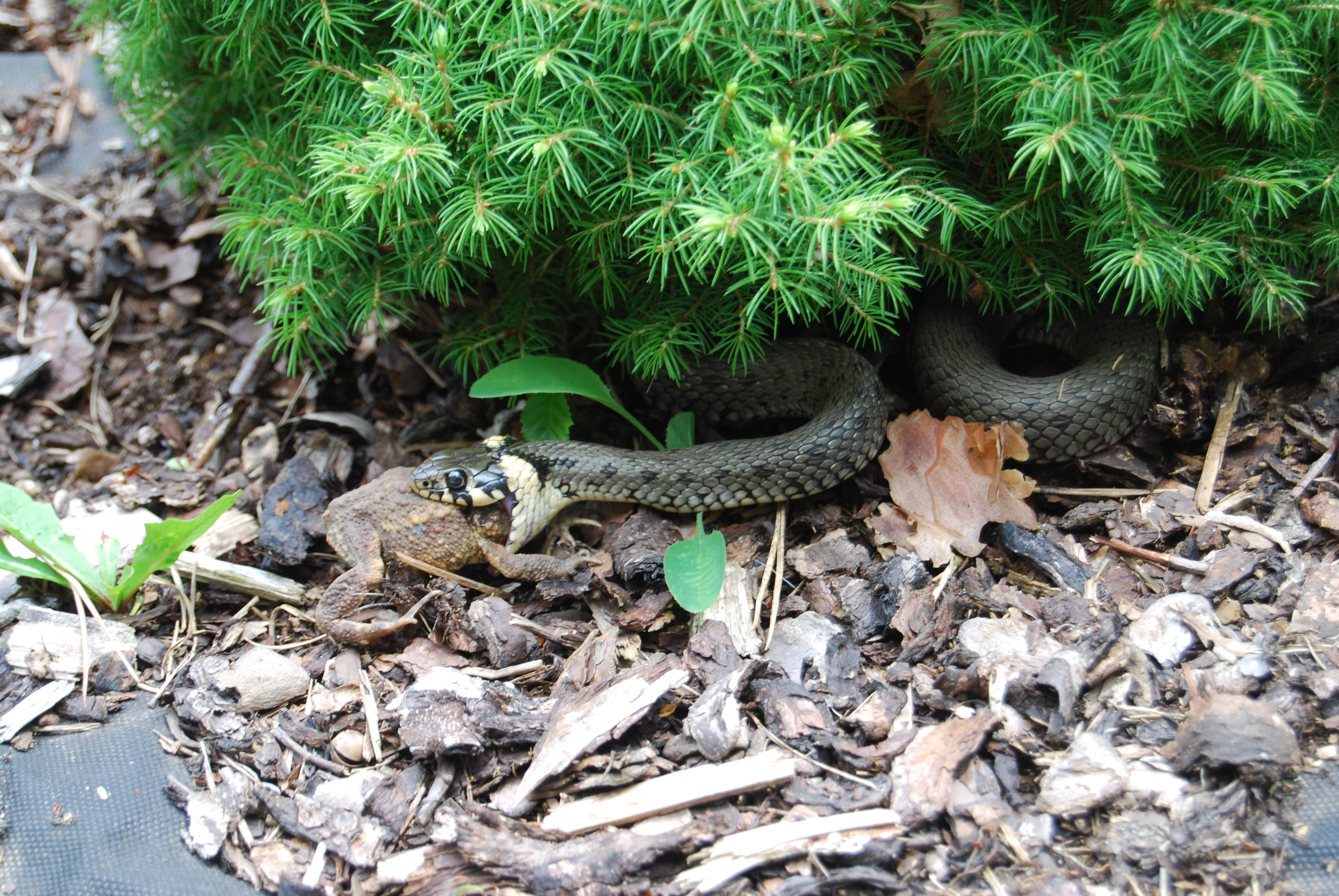
Grass snake eating adult common toad, Czech Republic

The common toad usually moves by walking rather slowly or making short shuffling jumps with all four legs. It spends the day concealed in a hollow it has made under foliage, a root or a stone, where its colouring makes it inconspicuous. It emerges at dusk and may travel some distance while hunting in the dark. It is most active in wet weather. By morning, it has returned to its lair, where it may remain for several months. It is voracious and eats woodlice, slugs, beetles, caterpillars, flies, ants, spiders, earthworms and even small mice. Small, fast-moving prey may be caught with a flick of the tongue while larger items are grabbed with the jaws. As it has no teeth, the species swallows food whole in a series of gulps. It does not recognise its prey as such, but will try to consume any small, dark-coloured, moving object it encounters at night. A research study showed that it would snap at a moving 1 cm (0.4 in) piece of black paper as if it were prey, but disregarded a larger moving piece. Toads seem to use visual cues for feeding and can see their prey at low light intensities where humans are unable to discern anything. Periodically, the common toad sheds its skin. This comes away in tattered pieces and is then consumed.

In 2007, researchers using a remotely operated underwater vehicle to survey Loch Ness in Scotland, observed a common toad moving along the lake bed at a depth of approximately 99 m (324 ft). They were surprised to find that an air-breathing animal could survive in such a location.

The annual life cycle of the common toad is divided into three periods: the winter sleep, the time of mating and feeding period.

=== Predators and parasites ===
When attacked, the common toad adopts a distinctive defensive posture, inflating its body and standing with its hindquarters raised and its head lowered. Its chief means of defence lies in the foul-tasting secretion that is produced by its paratoid glands and other glands on its skin. This secretion contains a toxin called bufagin, which is enough to deter many predators, although grass snakes seem to be unaffected by it. Other predators of adult toads include hedgehogs, rats, mink, and even domestic cats. Birds that feed on toads include herons, crows and birds of prey. Crows have been observed puncturing the skin with their beaks and pecking out the toad's liver to avoid the toxin. The tadpoles also secrete noxious substances to deter fish, but not great crested newts. Aquatic invertebrates that feed on toad tadpoles include dragonfly larvae, diving beetles and water boatmen. They usually avoid the noxious secretion by puncturing the tadpole's skin and sucking out its juices.

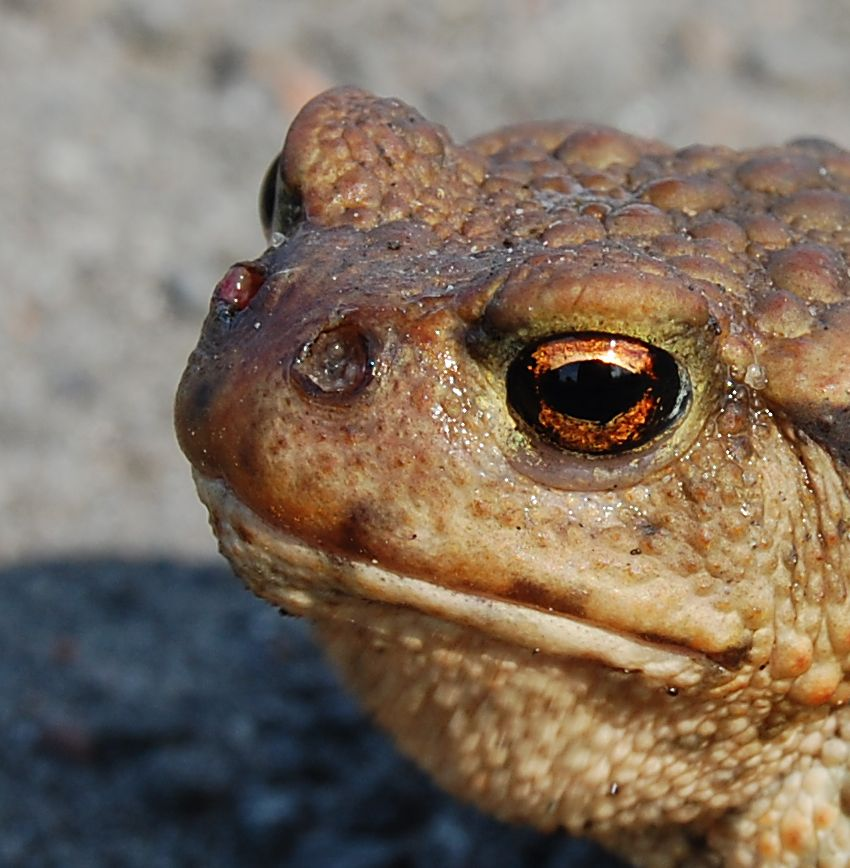
Infected with larvae of Lucilia bufonivora, Poland

A parasitic fly, Lucilia bufonivora, attacks adult common toads. The fly lays its eggs on the toad's skin, and when they hatch, the larvae crawl into the toad's nostrils and eat its flesh from inside, with lethal consequences. The European fingernail clam (Sphaerium corneum) is unusual in that it can climb up water plants and move around on its muscular foot. It sometimes clings to the toe of a common toad and this is believed to be one of the means by which it disperses to new locations.

=== Reproduction ===
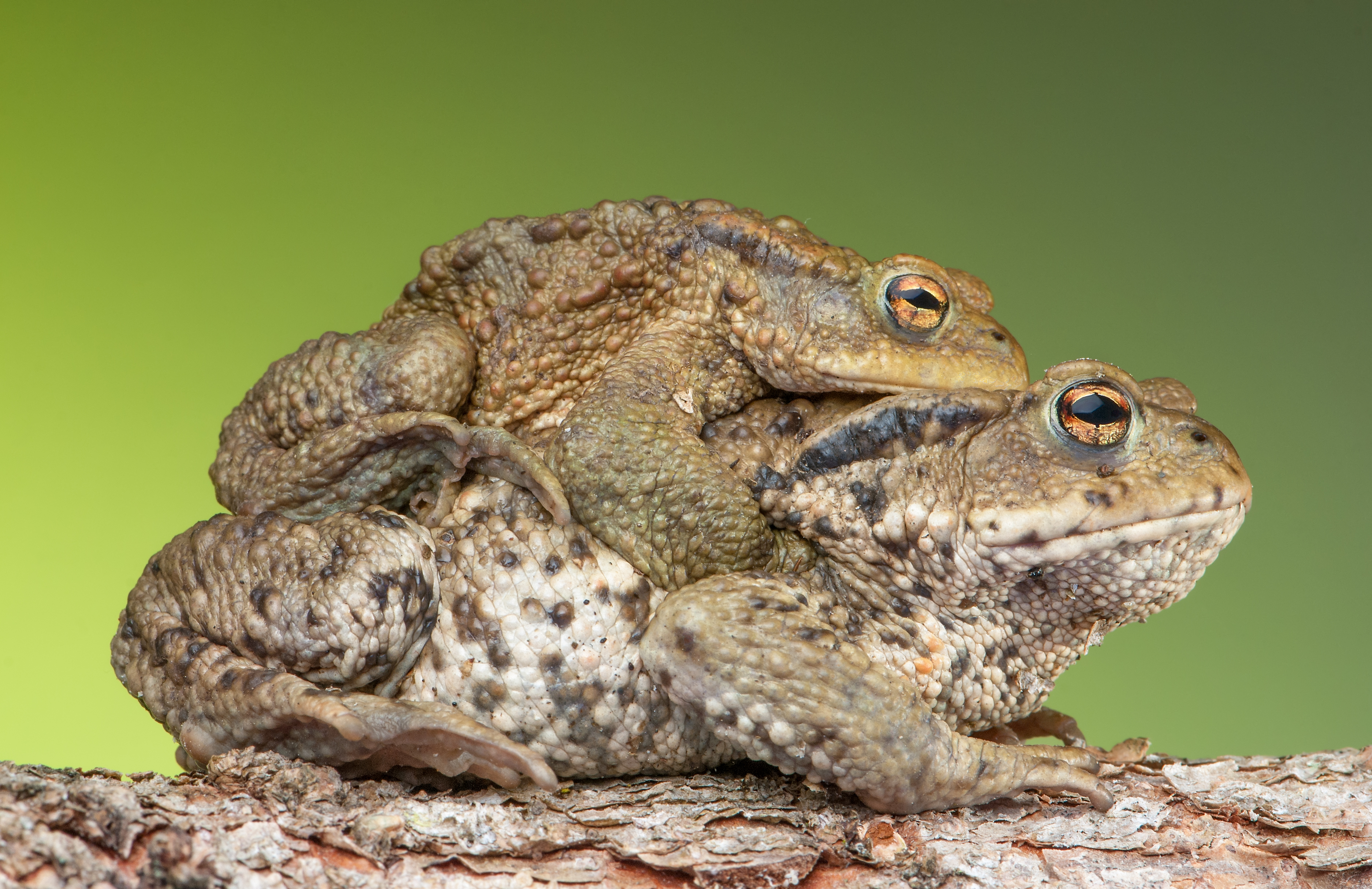
Amplexus

The common toad emerges from hibernation in spring, migrating en masse to the breeding sites. They converge on certain favoured ponds while avoiding other seemingly suitable stretches of water. Adults use the same location year after year, and over 80% of males marked as juveniles have been found to return to the pond where they were spawned. They find their way to these by using a suite of orientation cues, including olfactory and magnetic cues, but also visual cues help guide their journeys. Toads experimentally moved elsewhere and fitted with tracking devices have been found to be able to locate their chosen breeding pond when the displacement exceeded three kilometres (two miles).

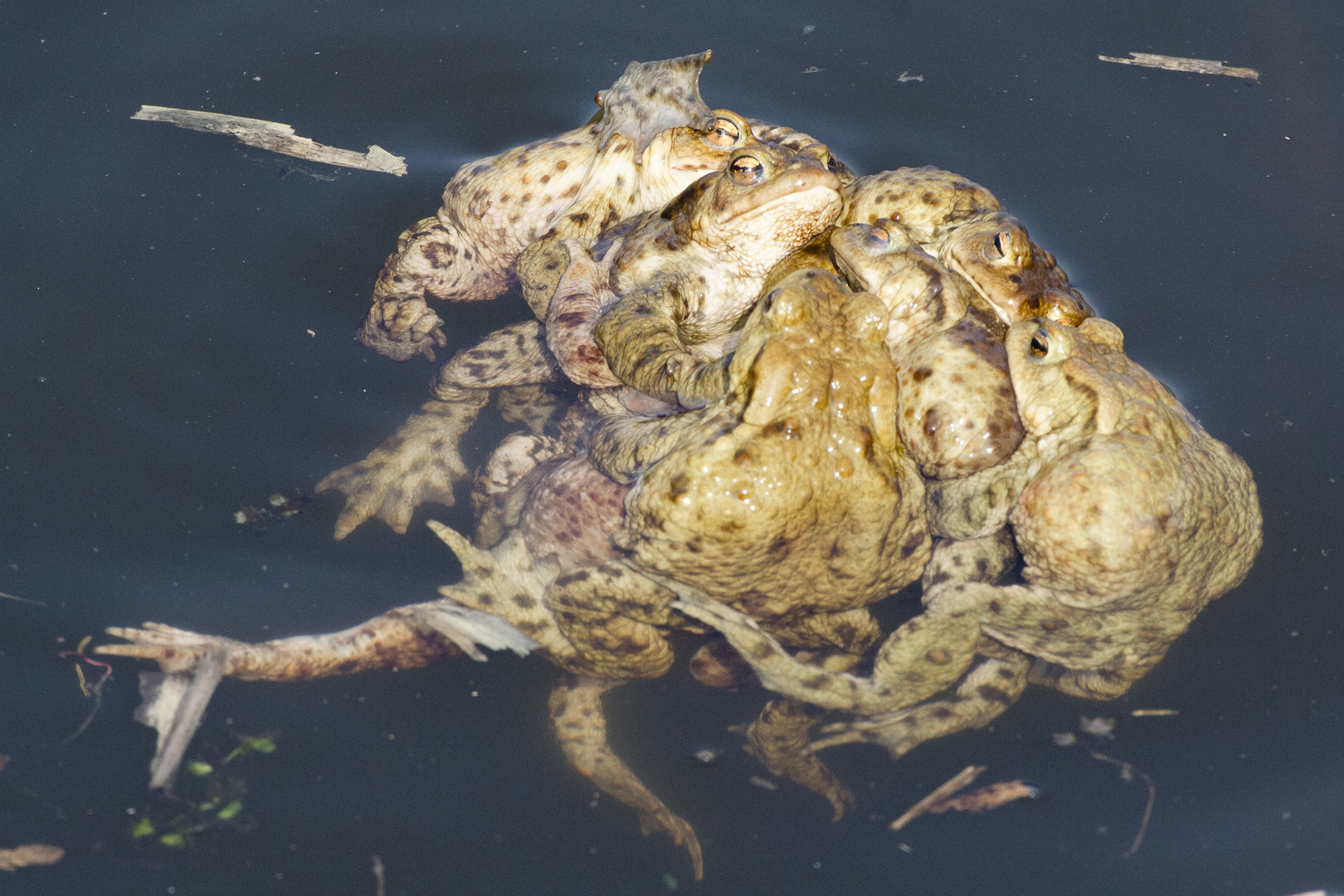
The mating ball (multiple amplexus).

The males arrive first and stay in the location for several weeks, whereas the females only stay long enough to mate and spawn. Rather than fighting for the right to mate with a female, male toads may resolve disputes through the pitch of their voice. The pitch of their croaking provides a reliable indication of body size, and therefore prowess. Nevertheless, fights do occur in some instances. A study of one pond, in which there were four to five times as many males as females, found that 38% of the males won the right to mate by defeating rivals in combat or by displacing other males that were already mounted on females. At breeding ponds, male toads generally outnumber females. A Swedish study found that female toads were more likely to die than males, with 41% not coming to the breeding pond in the spring, missing a year before reproducing again.

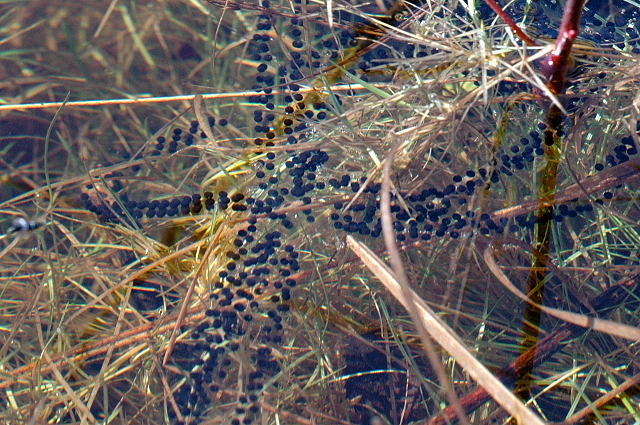
Egg strings, Belgium

Males mount the females' backs and grasp under the armpits with their forelimbs in a grip known as amplexus. Males can be very enthusiastic and will try to grasp fish or inanimate objects, as well as mounting the backs of other males. Sometimes, several toads form a heap, with each male trying to grasp the female at the base. This is a stressful period, with high mortality rates among breeding toads. A successful male will stay in amplexus for several days while the female lays a long, double string of small black eggs. He will fertilise these with his sperm as they are laid. As the pair wander around the shallow edges of the pond piggyback, the gelatinous egg strings, which may contain 1,500 to 6,000 eggs and be 3 to 4.5 metres (10 to 15 ft) in length, become entangled in plant stalks.

The strings of eggs absorb water and swell in size. Small tadpoles hatch after 10 days. At first, they cling to the remains of the strings, feeding on the jelly. They later attach themselves to the underside of the water weed leaves before becoming free-swimming. At first, the tadpole look similar to those of the common frog (Rana temporaria), but they are a darker colour, being blackish above and dark grey below. They can be distinguished from the tadpoles of other species by the fact that their mouth is the same width as the distance between their eyes, which is twice the width of the space between their nostrils. Over the course of a few weeks, their legs develop, and their tail gradually gets reabsorbed. By twelve weeks of age, they are miniature toads, measuring about 1.5 cm (0.6 in) long and ready to leave the pond.

=== Development and growth ===
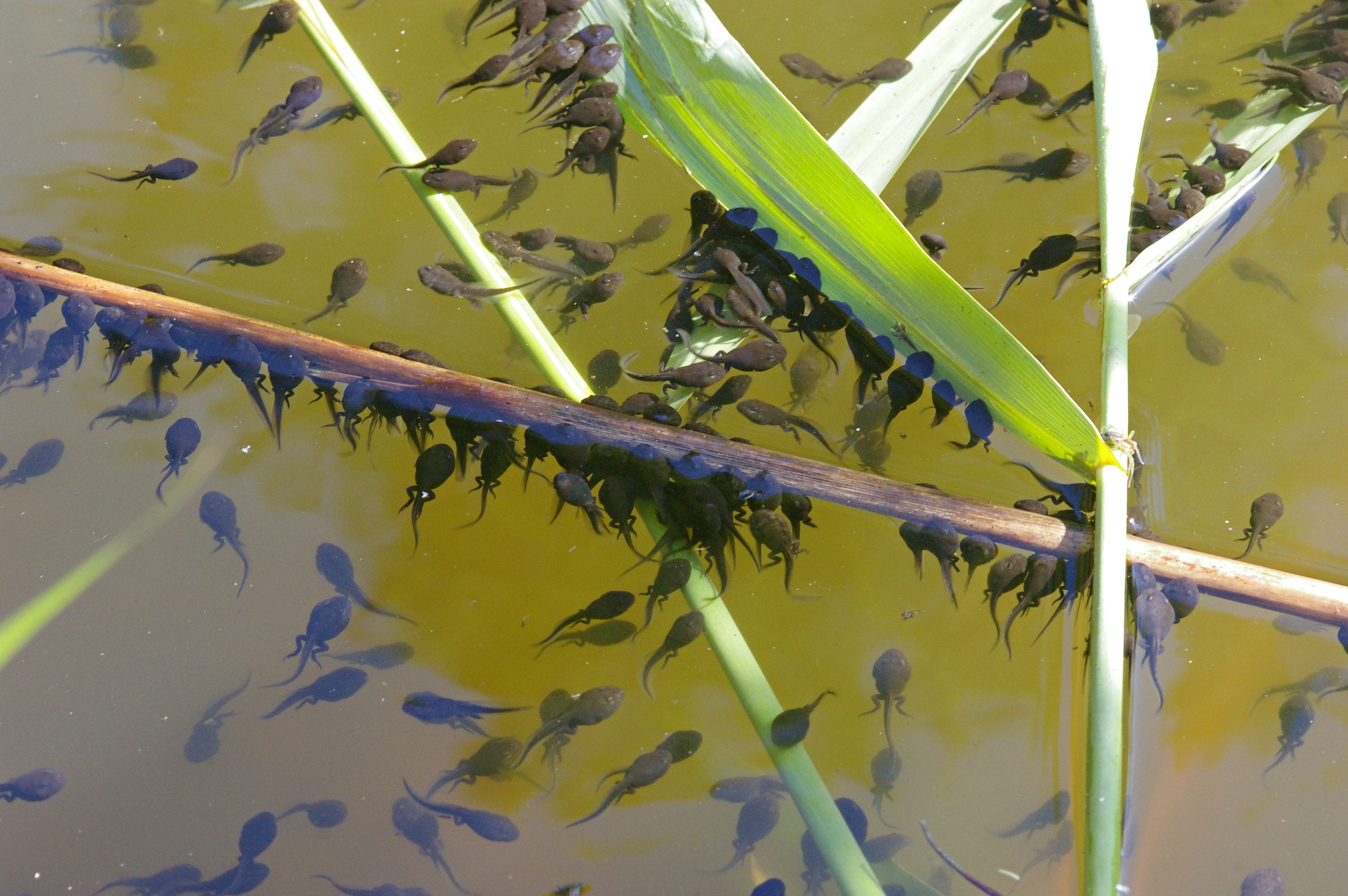
Tadpoles, some with hind legs, Germany

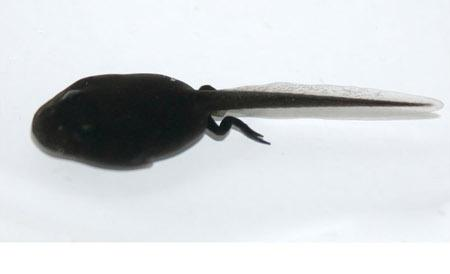
Tadpole close-up

The common toad reaches maturity at three to seven years old but there is great variability between populations. Juveniles are often parasitised by the lung nematode Rhabdias bufonis. This slows growth rates and reduces stamina and fitness. Larger juveniles at metamorphosis always outgrow smaller ones that have been reared in more crowded ponds. Even when they have heavy worm burdens, large juveniles grow faster than smaller individuals with light worm burdens. After several months of heavy worm infection, some juveniles in a study were only half as heavy as control juveniles. Their parasite-induced anorexia caused a decrease in food intake and some died. Another study investigated whether the use of nitrogenous fertilisers affects the development of common toad tadpoles. The toadlets were kept in dilute solutions of ammonium nitrate of various strengths. It was found that at certain concentrations, which were well above any normally found in the field, growth was increased and metamorphosis accelerated, but at others, there was no significant difference between the experimental tadpoles and controls. Nevertheless, certain unusual swimming patterns and a few deformities were found among the experimental animals.

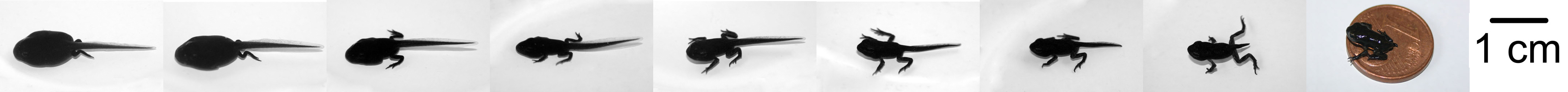
Tadpole development over a two-week period, Germany

A comparison was made between the growth rate of newly metamorphosed juveniles from different altitudes and latitudes, the specimens studied being from Norway, Germany, Switzerland, the Netherlands and France. At first the growth rates for males and females was identical. By the time they became mature their growth rate had slowed down to about 21% of the initial rate and they had reached 95% of their expected adult size. Some females that were on a biennial breeding cycle carried on growing rapidly for a longer time. Adjusting for differences in temperature and the length of the growing season, the toads grew and matured at much the same rate from the four colder localities. These juveniles reached maturity after 1.09 years for males and 1.55 years for females. However, the young toads from lowland France grew faster and longer to a much greater size taking an average 1.77 years for males and 2.49 years for females before reaching maturity.

=== Winter sleep ===
Common toads winter in various holes in the ground, sometimes in basements, often in droves with other amphibians. Rarely they spend the winter in flowing waters with the common frogs and green frogs.

=== Sperm senescence ===
The post-meiotic intra-testicular sperm of B. bufo undergoes senescence over time as measured by sperm motility. This type of sperm senescence does not occur at a genetically fixed rate, but rather is influenced by environmental conditions that include availability of mating partners and temperature.

== Conservation ==
The IUCN Red List of Threatened Species considers the common toad as being of "least concern". This is because it has a wide distribution and is, over most of its range, a common species. It is not particularly threatened by habitat loss because it is adaptable and is found in deciduous and coniferous forests, scrubland, meadows, parks and gardens. It prefers damp areas with dense foliage. The major threats it faces include loss of habitat locally, the drainage of wetlands where it breeds, agricultural activities, pollution, and mortality on roads. Chytridiomycosis, an infectious disease of amphibians, has been reported in common toads in Spain and the United Kingdom and may affect some populations.

There are parts of its range where the common toad seems to be in decline. In Spain, increased aridity and habitat loss have led to a diminution in numbers and it is regarded as "near threatened". A population in the Sierra de Gredos mountain range is facing predation by otters and increased competition from the frog Pelophylax perezi. Both otter and frog seem to be extending their ranges to higher altitudes. The common toad cannot be legally sold or traded in the United Kingdom but there is a slow decline in toad numbers and it has therefore been declared a Biodiversity Action Plan priority species. In Russia, it is considered to be a "Rare Species" in the Bashkortostan Republic, the Tatarstan Republic, the Yamalo-Nenets Autonomous Okrug, and the Irkutsk Oblast, but during the 1990s, it became more abundant in Moscow Oblast.

It has been found that urban populations of common toad occupying small areas and isolated by development show a lower level of genetic diversity and reduced fitness as compared to nearby rural populations. The researchers demonstrated this by genetic analysis and by noting the greater number of physical abnormalities among urban as against rural tadpoles when raised in a controlled environment. It was considered that long term depletion in numbers and habitat fragmentation can reduce population persistence in such urban environments.

=== Roadkill ===
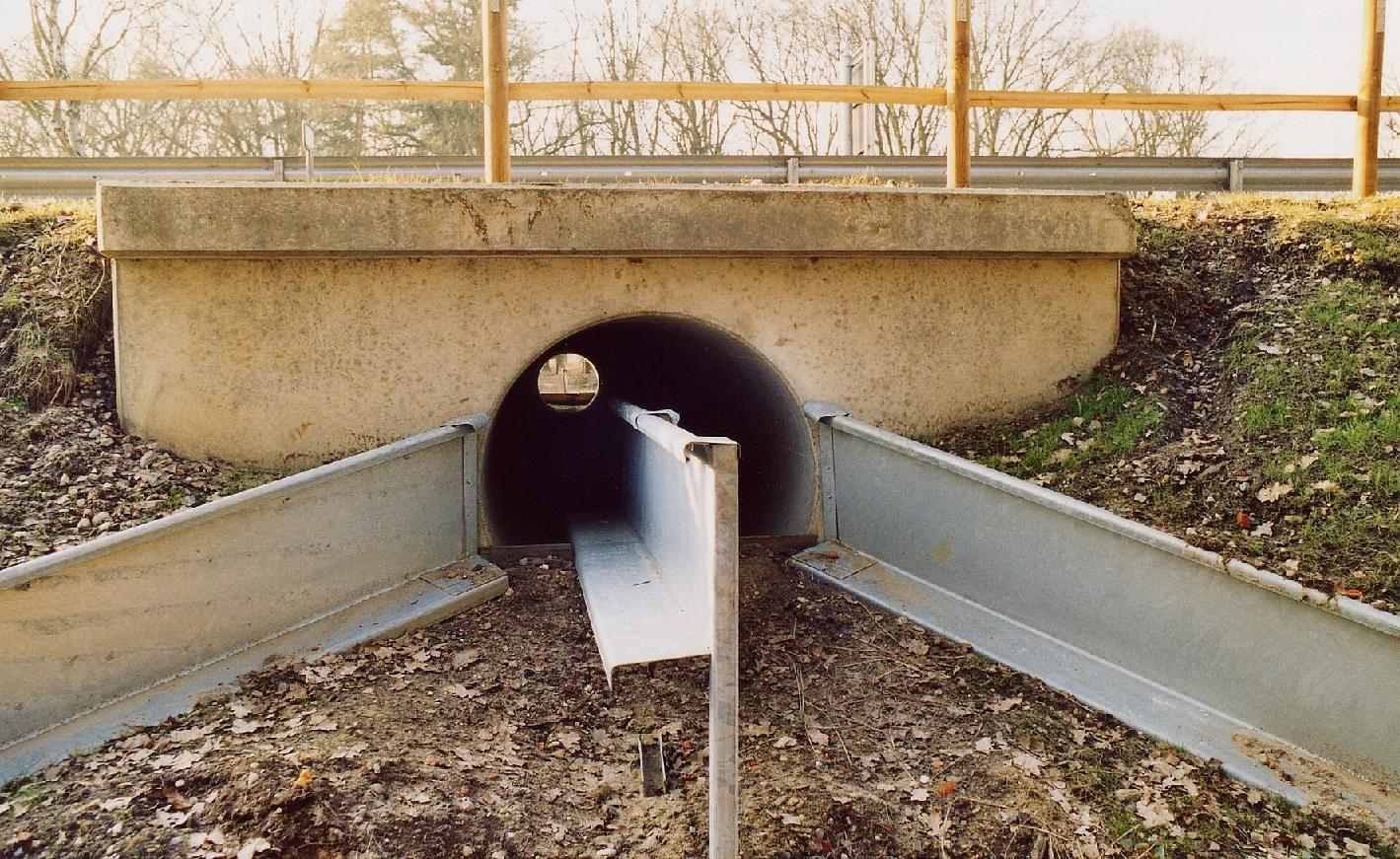
Tunnel under road for toads, Germany

Many toads are killed by traffic while migrating to their breeding grounds. They have the highest roadkill mortality rate among amphibians in Europe. Many of these deaths occur on stretches of road where streams flow underneath, demonstrating that migration routes often follow watercourses. In some places in Germany, Belgium, the Netherlands, Great Britain, Northern Italy and Poland, special tunnels have been constructed so that toads can cross under roads in safety. In other areas, local wildlife groups run "toad patrols", carrying toads across busy roads in buckets across key crossing points. The toads start moving at dusk, but they need a temperature above 5 °C (41 °F) to travel far. On a warm, wet night, they may continue moving all night, but if it cools down, they may stop earlier. An estimate was made of the significance of roadkill in toad populations in the Netherlands. The number of females killed in the spring migration on a quiet country road (ten vehicles per hour) was compared with the number of strings of eggs laid in nearby fens. A 30% mortality rate was found, with the rate for deaths among males likely to be of a similar order.

== Bufotoxin ==
The main substance found in the parotoid gland and skin of the common toad is called bufotoxin. It was first isolated by Heinrich Wieland and his colleagues in 1922, and they succeeded in identifying its structure about 20 years later. Meanwhile, other researchers succeeded in isolating the same compound (and its parent steroid, bufotalin) from the Japanese toad, Bufo japonicus.

By 1986, researchers at Arizona State University had succeeded in synthesising the toad toxin constituents bufotalin, bufalitoxin and bufotoxin. The chemical formula of bufotoxin is C_{40}H_{60}N_{4}O_{10}. Its physical effects resemble those of digoxin, which, in small doses, increases the strength with which the heart muscle contracts; synthesized from foxglove plants (Digitalis purpurea), digoxin is used in the treatment of congestive heart failure. The skin of the South American cane toad contains enough similar toxin to cause serious symptoms (or even death) in animals, including humans. Clinical effects include severe irritation and pain in the eyes, mouth, nose and throat, cardiovascular and respiratory symptoms, paralysis and seizures, increased salivation, vomiting, hyperkalemia, cyanosis and hallucinations. There is no known anti-venom. Treatment consists of supporting respiratory and cardiovascular functions, prevention of absorption and electrocardiography to monitor the condition. Atropine, phenytoin, cholestyramine and lidocaine may prove useful in its management.

== Cultural significance ==
The Devil's coat of arms

The toad has long been considered to an ominous creature or a gateway to the spirit world. This may be because it is at home both on land and in the water. its drab, wart-like skin, slow movements and emergence from dark holes may cause repugnance. In Europe in the Middle Ages, the toad was associated with the Devil, for whom a coat-of-arms was invented bearing three toads. It was known that the toad could poison people and, as the witch's familiar, it was thought to possess magical powers. Even ordinary people made use of dried toads, their bile, faeces and blood. In some areas, the finding of a toad in a house was considered evidence that a witch was present. In the Basque Country, the familiars were believed to be toads wearing elegant robes. These were herded by children who were being trained as witches. Between 1610 and 1612, the Spanish inquisitor Alonso de Salazar Frías investigated witchcraft in the region and searched the houses of suspected witches for dressed toads. He found none. These witches were reputed to use undomesticated toads as ingredients in their liniments and brews.

An English folk tale tells how an old woman, a supposed witch, cursed her landlord and all his possessions when he demanded the unpaid rent for her cottage. Soon afterwards, a large toad fell on his wife and caused her to collapse. The toad was thrown into the fire but escaped with severe burns. Meanwhile, the old witch's cottage had caught fire and she was badly burnt. By next day, both toad and witch had died, and it was found that the woman's burns exactly mirrored those of the toad.

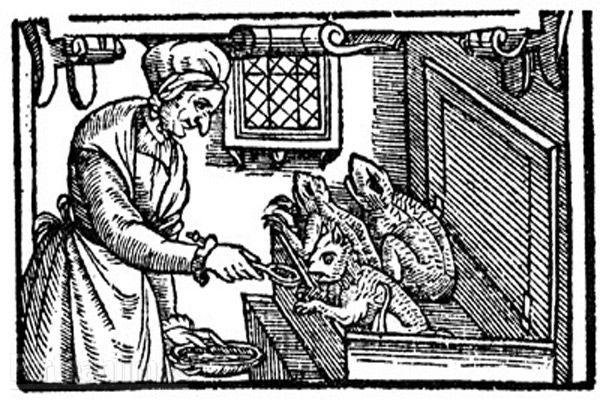
1579 woodcut showing a witch feeding her toad familiars

The saliva of the toad was considered poisonous and was known as "sweltered venom" and it was believed that it could spit or vomit poisonous fire. Toads were associated with devils and demons and in Paradise Lost, John Milton depicted Satan as a toad when he poured poison into Eve's ear. The First Witch in William Shakespeare's Macbeth gave instructions on using a toad in the concoction of spells:

Round about the cauldron go;
In the poison'd entrails throw.
Toad, that under cold stone
Days and nights has thirty-one
Swelter'd venom sleeping got,
Boil thou first i' the charmed pot.

It was also believed that there was a jewel inside a toad's head, a "toadstone", that when worn as a necklace or ring would warn the wearer of attempts to poison them. Shakespeare mentioned this in As You Like It:

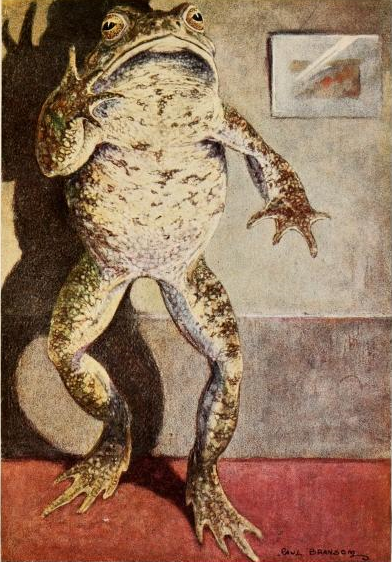
Mr. Toad as illustrated by Paul Bransom, 1913

Sweet are the uses of adversity
Which, like the toad, ugly and venomous,
Wears yet a precious jewel in his head.

Mr. Toad is one of the main characters in the children's novel The Wind in the Willows, by Kenneth Grahame. This has been dramatized by several authors including A. A. Milne who called his play Toad of Toad Hall. Mr. Toad is a conceited, anthropomorphic toad and in the book he composes a ditty in his own praise which starts like this:

The world has held great heroes,
As history books have showed;
But never a name went down to fame
Compared with that of Toad!

The clever men at Oxford
Know all there is to be knowed.
But none of them know half as much
As intelligent Mr. Toad!

George Orwell in his essay Some Thoughts on the Common Toad described the emergence of the common toad from hibernation as one of the most moving signs of spring.

== See also ==
- The spiny toad Bufo spinosus - a part of the B. bufo species complex, formerly considered to be a subspecies of the common toad).
