= C24H32O6 =

The molecular formula C_{24}H_{32}O_{6} (molar mass: 416.50 g/mol, exact mass: 416.219889) may refer to:

- Arenobufagin, a bufanolide steroid
- Deoxyschizandrin
- Desonide, a steroid hormone
- Methylprednisolone acetate, a corticosteroid
- Verrucosidin, a fungal polyketide
