= Bufotalin =

Names
- IUPAC name 3β,14-Dihydroxy-5β-bufa-20,22-dienolid-16β-yl acetate
- Systematic IUPAC name (1R,2S,3aS,3bR,5aR,7S,9aS,9bS,11aR)-3a,7-Dihydroxy-9a,11a-dimethyl-1-(1-oxo-1H-oxan-5-yl)hexadecahydro-1H-cyclopenta[a]phenanthren-2-yl acetate

Identifiers
CAS Number	471-95-4
3D model (JSmol)	Interactive image
ChEBI	CHEBI:80799
ChEMBL	ChEMBL463064
ChemSpider	16735710
KEGG	C16923
PubChem CID	10119
UNII	EGL9670I6P
CompTox Dashboard (EPA)	DTXSID60894008
- InChI: InChI=1S/C26H36O6/c1-15(27)32-21-13-26(30)20-6-5-17-12-18(28)8-10-24(17,2)19(20)9-11-25(26,3)23(21)16-4-7-22(29)31-14-16/h4,7,14,17-21,23,28,30H,5-6,8-13H2,1-3H3/t17-,18+,19+,20-,21+,23+,24+,25-,26+/m1/s1 Key: VOZHMAYHYHEWBW-NVOOAVKYSA-N; InChI=1/C26H36O6/c1-15(27)32-21-13-26(30)20-6-5-17-12-18(28)8-10-24(17,2)19(20)9-11-25(26,3)23(21)16-4-7-22(29)31-14-16/h4,7,14,17-21,23,28,30H,5-6,8-13H2,1-3H3/t17-,18+,19+,20-,21+,23+,24+,25-,26+/m1/s1 Key: VOZHMAYHYHEWBW-NVOOAVKYBX
- SMILES: CC(=O)O[C@H]1C[C@@]2(C3CC[C@@H]4C[C@H](CC[C@@]4(C3CC[C@@]2([C@H]1C5=COC(=O)C=C5)C)C)O)O

Properties
Chemical formula	C_{26}H_{36}O_{6}
Molar mass	444.568 g·mol^{−1}
Appearance	crystalline solid

Hazards
- Occupational safety and health (OHS/OSH)
Main hazards	Toxic
- Lethal dose or concentration (LD, LC)
LD_{50} (median dose)	4.13 mg·kg^{−1} (mouse, IV) 0.4 mg·kg^{−1} (mouse, SC); 0.136 mg·kg^{−1} (cat, IV)
- Except where otherwise noted, data are given for materials in their standard state (at 25 °C [77 °F], 100 kPa). verify (what is ?) Infobox references

Bufotalin is a cardiotoxic bufanolide steroid, cardiac glycoside analogue, secreted by a number of toad species. Bufotalin can be extracted from the skin parotoid glands of several types of toad.

== Sources ==
Rhinella marina (Cane toad), Rhaebo guttatus (Smooth-sided toad), Bufo melanostictus (Asian toad), and Bufo bufo (common European toad) are sources of bufotalin.

== Traditional medicine ==
Bufotalin is part of Ch'an Su, a traditional Chinese medicine used for cancer. It is also known as Venenum Bufonis or senso (Japanese).

== Toxicity ==
Specifically, in cats the lethal median dose is 0.13 mg/kg. and in dogs is 0.36 mg/kg (intravenous).

Knowing this it is advisable to monitor those functions continuously using an EKG. As there is no antidote against bufotalin all occurring symptoms need to be treated separately or if possible in combination with others. To increase the clearance theoretically, due to the similarities with digitoxin, cholestyramine, a bile salt, might help. Recent animal studies have shown that taurine restores cardiac functions.

Symptomatic measures include lignocaine, atropine and phenytoin for cardiac toxicity and intravenous potassium compounds to correct hyperkalaemia from its effect on the Na^{+}/K^{+} ATPase pump.

== Pharmacology and mechanism of action ==
After a single intravenous injection, bufotalin gets quickly distributed and eliminated from the blood plasma with a half-time of 28.6 minutes and a MRT of 14.7 min. After 30 minutes after an administration of bufotalin, the concentrations within the brain and lungs are significantly higher than those in blood and other tissues. It also increases cancer cell's susceptibility to apoptosis via TNF-α signalling by the BH3 interacting domain death agonist and STAT proteins.

Bufotalin induces apoptosis in vitro in human hepatocellular carcinoma Hep 3B cells and might involve caspases and apoptosis inducing factor (AIF). The use of bufotalin as a cancer treating compound is still in the experimental phase. It also arrests cell cycle at G(2)/M, by up- and down- regulation of several enzymes.

== Pharmacokinetics ==
The mechanism of the biotransformation of bufotalin is still unknown. Researches found, that bufotalin is biotransformed into at least 5 different compounds.

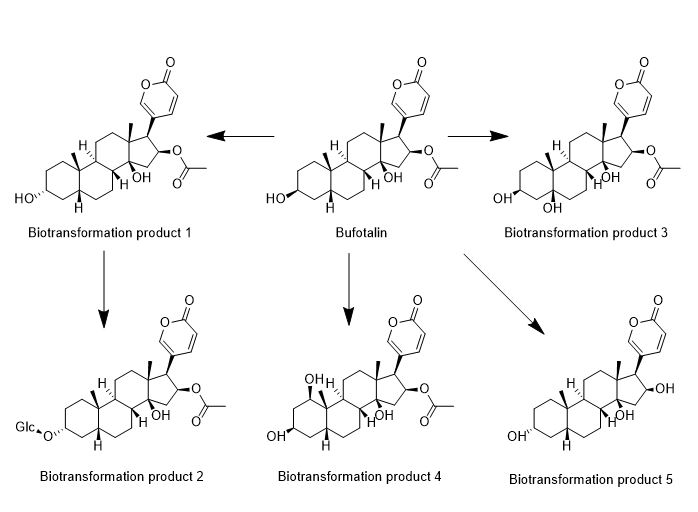
The five known biotransformation products of bufotalin.

== Chemical properties ==
If bufotalin is esterified with suberyl arginine, the bufotalin-like steroid bufotoxin is obtained.
