= ATPase, Na+/K+ transporting, alpha 1 =

Protein found in humans

ATP1A1
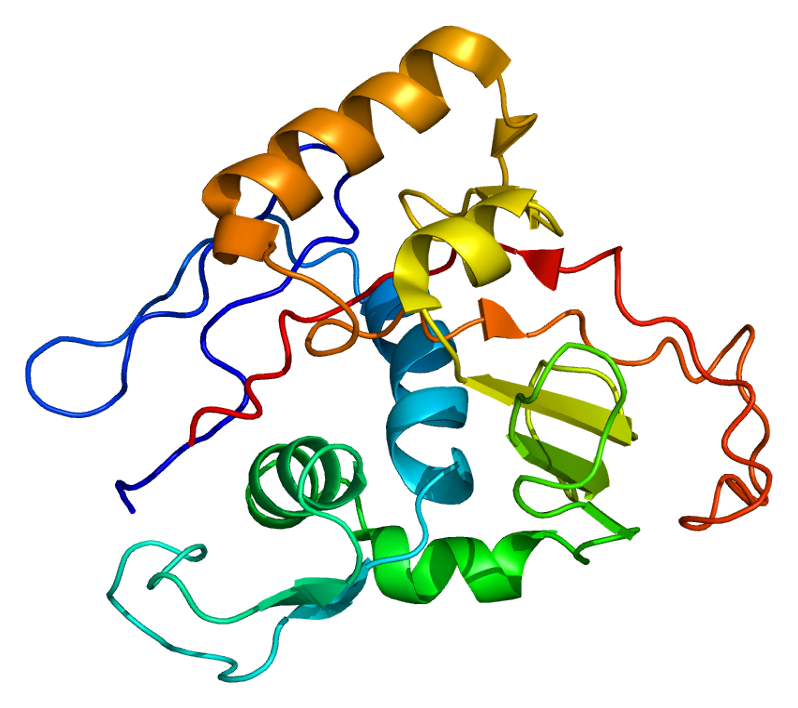

Identifiers
- Aliases: ATP1A1, ATPase, Na+/K+ transporting, alpha 1, ATPase Na+/K+ transporting subunit alpha 1, CMT2DD, HOMGSMR2
- External IDs: OMIM: 182310; MGI: 88105; GeneCards: ATP1A1
Enzyme activity
EC #	BRENDA	ExPASy	KEGG	MetaCyc
7.2.2.13	↗	↗	↗	↗

Gene location (Human)
Chr.	Chromosome 1 (human)
Band	1p13.1	Start	116,372,668 bp
Band	1p13.1	End	116,410,261 bp

Gene location (Mouse)
Chr.	Chromosome 3 (mouse)
Band	3 F2.2|3 44.3 cM	Start	101,483,535 bp
Band	3 F2.2|3 44.3 cM	End	101,512,000 bp
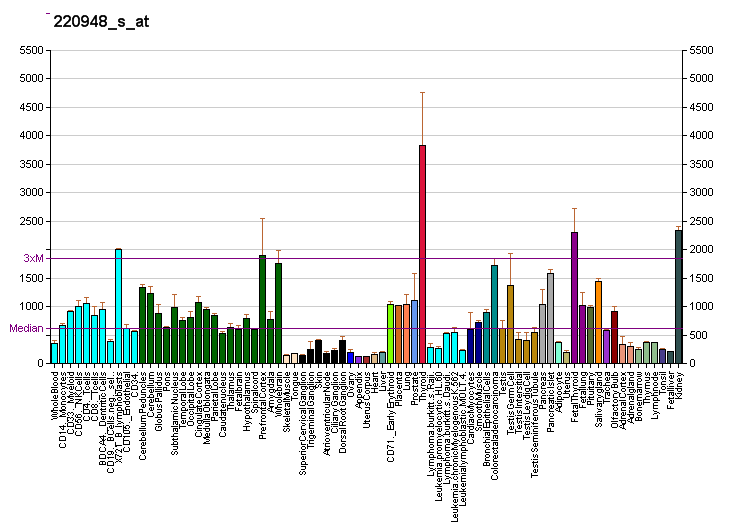
RNA expression pattern
Bgee	Human / Mouse (ortholog); Top expressed in: renal medulla; right lobe of thyroid gland; left lobe of thyroid gland; mucosa of ileum; mucosa of transverse colon; cerebellar hemisphere; right hemisphere of cerebellum; human kidney; gallbladder; islet of Langerhans / Top expressed in: vestibular membrane of cochlear duct; human kidney; submandibular gland; epithelium of lens; left colon; parotid gland; choroid plexus of fourth ventricle; transitional epithelium of urinary bladder; duodenum; stria vascularis; More reference expression data
BioGPS	More reference expression data
Gene ontology
Molecular function	steroid hormone binding; nucleotide binding; chaperone binding; protein domain specific binding; phosphatase activity; ADP binding; potassium ion binding; sodium ion binding; P-type sodium:potassium-exchanging transporter activity; metal ion binding; phosphatidylinositol 3-kinase binding; protein binding; ankyrin binding; hydrolase activity; ATP binding; protein kinase binding; P-type potassium transmembrane transporter activity
Cellular component	integral component of membrane; extracellular vesicle; endosome; Golgi apparatus; membrane; intercalated disc; T-tubule; melanosome; myelin sheath; plasma membrane; sodium:potassium-exchanging ATPase complex; basolateral plasma membrane; apical plasma membrane; endoplasmic reticulum; caveola; membrane raft; sarcolemma; extracellular exosome; postsynaptic density; protein-containing complex
Biological process	cellular response to steroid hormone stimulus; regulation of cardiac conduction; membrane hyperpolarization; regulation of sodium ion transport; regulation of the force of heart contraction; negative regulation of heart contraction; sodium ion transport; cellular sodium ion homeostasis; sodium ion export across plasma membrane; cell communication by electrical coupling involved in cardiac conduction; response to glycoside; ion transport; cellular potassium ion homeostasis; regulation of blood pressure; potassium ion transport; positive regulation of heart contraction; ion transmembrane transport; cellular response to mechanical stimulus; regulation of cardiac muscle cell contraction; membrane repolarization; positive regulation of striated muscle contraction; negative regulation of glucocorticoid biosynthetic process; membrane repolarization during cardiac muscle cell action potential; relaxation of cardiac muscle; dephosphorylation; potassium ion import across plasma membrane; establishment or maintenance of transmembrane electrochemical gradient; cardiac muscle cell action potential involved in contraction; transport
Sources:Amigo / QuickGO
Orthologs
Databases	NCBI: entry; OMA: entry
Species	Human	Mouse
Entrez	476	11928
Ensembl	ENSG00000163399	ENSMUSG00000033161
UniProt	P05023; Q5TC02	Q8VDN2
RefSeq (mRNA)	NM_000701; NM_001001586; NM_001160233; NM_001160234	NM_144900
RefSeq (protein)	NP_000692; NP_001153705; NP_001153706	NP_659149
Location (UCSC)	Chr 1: 116.37 – 116.41 Mb	Chr 3: 101.48 – 101.51 Mb
PubMed search
- Wikidata
View/Edit Human	View/Edit Mouse

Gastric H^{+}/K^{+}-ATPase, N terminal domain
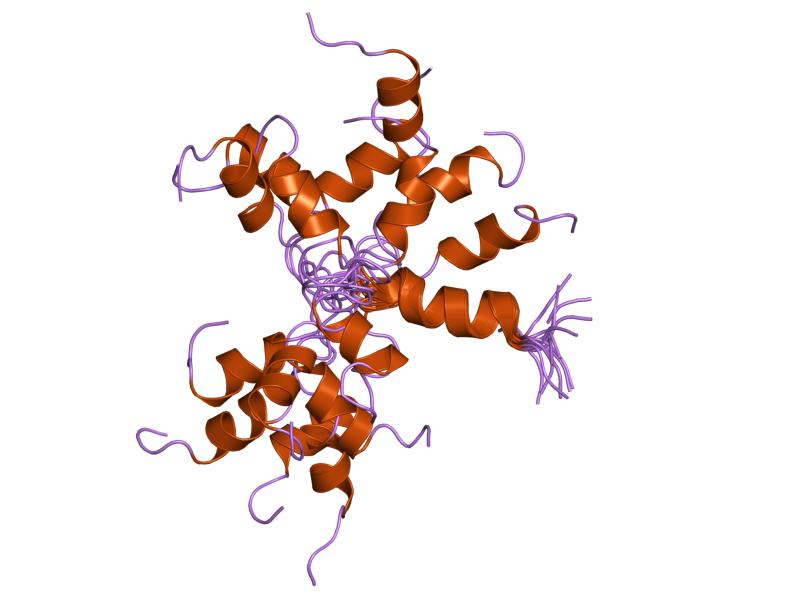
- tfe-induded structure of the n-terminal domain of pig gastric h/k-atpase

Identifiers
- Symbol: H-K_ATPase_N
- Pfam: PF09040
- InterPro: IPR015127
Available protein structures:
- PDB: IPR015127 PF09040 (ECOD; PDBsum)
- AlphaFold: IPR015127; PF09040

Sodium/potassium-transporting ATPase subunit alpha-1 is an enzyme that in humans is encoded by the ATP1A1 gene.

The protein encoded by this gene belongs to the family of P-type cation transport ATPases, and to the subfamily of Na^{+}/K^{+}-ATPases. Na^{+}/K^{+}-ATPase is an integral membrane protein responsible for establishing and maintaining the electrochemical gradients of Na and K ions across the plasma membrane. These gradients are essential for osmoregulation, for sodium-coupled transport of a variety of organic and inorganic molecules, and for electrical excitability of nerve and muscle. This enzyme is composed of two subunits, a large catalytic subunit (alpha) and a smaller glycoprotein subunit (beta). The catalytic subunit of Na^{+}/K^{+}-ATPase is encoded by multiple genes. This gene encodes an alpha 1 subunit. Alternatively spliced transcript variants encoding different isoforms have been identified.

In melanocytic cells ATP1A1 gene expression may be regulated by MITF.

== Clinical relevance ==
Mutations in this gene have been associated with aldosterone-producing adenomas and secondary hypertension.
