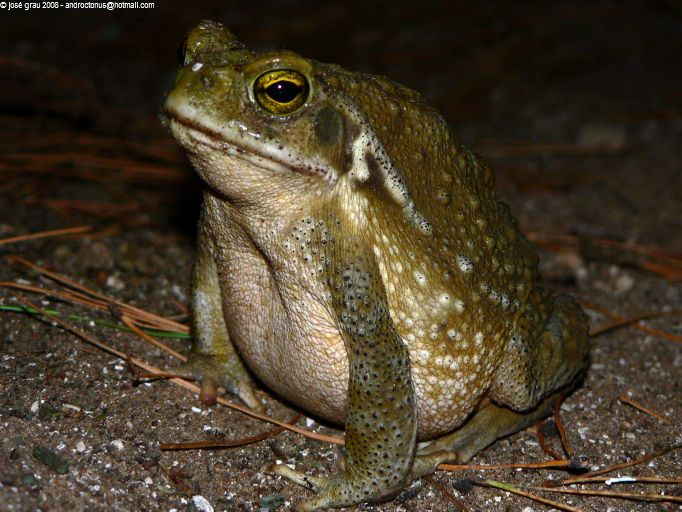
- In Argentina

Conservation status
- Least Concern (IUCN 3.1)

Scientific classification
- Kingdom: Animalia
- Phylum: Chordata
- Class: Amphibia
- Order: Anura
- Family: Bufonidae
- Genus: Rhinella
- Species: R. arenarum

Binomial name
- Rhinella arenarum (Hensel, 1867)

Synonyms
- Bufo arenarum Hensel, 1867; †Bufo pisanoi Casamiquela, 1967; Chaunus arenarum (Hensel, 1867)

= Rhinella arenarum =

Species of amphibian

Rhinella arenarum is a species of toad in the family Bufonidae that is found in southern Brazil, Uruguay, Paraguay, Argentina (Chubut Province northward) and Bolivia (east of the Andes). Rhinella arenarum inhabits small ponds or bogs with stagnant water, in dry, temperate habitats, mostly in open areas. It is locally common. While it is collected for educational and scientific uses and also suffers from road kills, it in general is not threatened. Fossils representing this species are known with certainty from the late Pliocene to the Holocene of central Argentina.
