= Marinobufagenin =

Names
- IUPAC name 3β,5-Dihydroxy-14,15-epoxy-5β,14β-bufa-20,22-dienolide
- Systematic IUPAC name 5-[(1R,2aR,3aS,3bR,5aS,7S,9aR,9bS,11aR)-5b,7-Dihydroxy-9a,11a-dimethylhexadecahydronaphtho[1′,2′:6,7]indeno[1,7a-b]oxiren-1-yl]-2H-pyran-2-one
- Other names Marinobufagin, Marinobufagenin

Identifiers
CAS Number	470-42-8
3D model (JSmol)	Interactive image
ChemSpider	10142870
PubChem CID	11969465
UNII	3KBT25GV2B
CompTox Dashboard (EPA)	DTXSID5041063
- InChI: InChI=1S/C24H32O5/c1-21-8-5-15(25)12-23(21,27)10-7-17-16(21)6-9-22(2)18(11-19-24(17,22)29-19)14-3-4-20(26)28-13-14/h3-4,13,15-19,25,27H,5-12H2,1-2H3/t15-,16-,17+,18+,19+,21+,22+,23-,24+/m0/s1 Key: JMNQTHQLNRILMH-OBBGIPBRSA-N; InChI=1/C24H32O5/c1-21-8-5-15(25)12-23(21,27)10-7-17-16(21)6-9-22(2)18(11-19-24(17,22)29-19)14-3-4-20(26)28-13-14/h3-4,13,15-19,25,27H,5-12H2,1-2H3/t15-,16-,17+,18+,19+,21+,22+,23-,24+/m0/s1 Key: JMNQTHQLNRILMH-OBBGIPBRBU
- SMILES: C[C@]12CC[C@@H](C[C@]1(CCC3C2CC[C@]4([C@]35[C@H](O5)C[C@@H]4C6=COC(=O)C=C6)C)O)O

Properties
Chemical formula	C_{24}H_{32}O_{5}
Molar mass	400.515 g·mol^{−1}

Hazards
- Occupational safety and health (OHS/OSH)
Main hazards	Toxic
- Except where otherwise noted, data are given for materials in their standard state (at 25 °C [77 °F], 100 kPa). verify (what is ?) Infobox references

Marinobufagenin (marinobufagin, MBG) is a cardiotonic bufadienolide steroid. It is secreted by the toad species such as Bufo marinus. It also can be found in the plasma and urine of human subjects with myocardial infarction, kidney failure, heart failure, and preeclampsia. MBG is a vasoconstrictor and a sodium–potassium adenosine triphosphatase (Na/K-ATPase) inhibitor with a high affinity for the alpha-1 isoform of the enzyme, the main isoform in the vascular wall and the kidney.

It is produced by adrenal cortex and placenta via CYP27a1 pathway. MBG regulates the monovalent ions balance and cell homeostasis, and by binding to the Na/K-ATPase, it affects cell growth and differentiation, apoptosis, and proliferation. A novel effect of MBG is their ability to induce intracellular signaling, leading to a loss of elasticity and vascular fibrosis.

One of the mechanisms of the pro-fibrotic effect of MBG is the inhibition of the activity of Fli1, a nuclear transcription factor and a negative regulator of collagen 1 synthesis. Fli1 competes with another transcription factor, ETS-1, to maintain a balance between stimulation and repression of the collagen-1 gene. The Na/K ATPase/Src/EGFR complex emerges as a signal cascade, which activates phospholipase C, resulting in the phosphorylation of PKCδ and its translocation to the nucleus. In the nucleus, PKCδ phosphorylates Fli1, which withdraws the Fli1-induced inhibition of the collagen-1 promoter and increases procollagen expression and collagen production.

The antagonism of the pressor and profibrotic effects of MBG by monoclonal anti-MBG antibodies may lead to the prevention of vascular fibrosis in patients with end-stage renal disease and preeclampsia.
