= Cinobufagin =

Names
- IUPAC name 3β-Hydroxy-14,15β-epoxy-5β-bufa-20,22-dienolid-16β-yl acetate
- Systematic IUPAC name (1R,2R,2aR,3aS,3bR,5aR,7S,9aS,9bS,11aR)-7-Hydroxy-9a,11a-dimethyl-1-(2-oxo-2H-pyran-5-yl)hexadecahydronaphtho[1′,2′:6,7]indeno[1,7a-b]oxiran-2-yl acetate
- Other names Cinobufagin

Identifiers
CAS Number	470-37-1
3D model (JSmol)	Interactive image
ChEBI	CHEBI:80805
ChEMBL	ChEMBL250785
ChemSpider	10142947
ECHA InfoCard	100.164.680
EC Number	636-927-8
KEGG	C16931
PubChem CID	11969542
UNII	T9PSN4R8IR
CompTox Dashboard (EPA)	DTXSID701026953
- InChI: InChI=1S/C26H34O6/c1-14(27)31-22-21(15-4-7-20(29)30-13-15)25(3)11-9-18-19(26(25)23(22)32-26)6-5-16-12-17(28)8-10-24(16,18)2/h4,7,13,16-19,21-23,28H,5-6,8-12H2,1-3H3/t16-,17+,18+,19-,21+,22-,23-,24+,25-,26-/m1/s1 Key: SCULJPGYOQQXTK-OLRINKBESA-N; InChI=1/C26H34O6/c1-14(27)31-22-21(15-4-7-20(29)30-13-15)25(3)11-9-18-19(26(25)23(22)32-26)6-5-16-12-17(28)8-10-24(16,18)2/h4,7,13,16-19,21-23,28H,5-6,8-12H2,1-3H3/t16-,17+,18+,19-,21+,22-,23-,24+,25-,26-/m1/s1 Key: SCULJPGYOQQXTK-OLRINKBEBZ
- SMILES: O=C\1O\C=C(/C=C/1)[C@@H]4[C@@]6(C)CC[C@H]3[C@@H](CC[C@@H]2C[C@@H](O)CC[C@@]23C)[C@]65O[C@@H]5[C@@H]4OC(=O)C

Properties
Chemical formula	C_{26}H_{34}O_{6}
Molar mass	442.552 g·mol^{−1}

Hazards
- Occupational safety and health (OHS/OSH)
Main hazards	Toxic
- GHS labelling
Pictograms	(GHS06: Toxic)
Signal word	Danger
Hazard statements	H300, H310, H330
Precautionary statements	P260, P262, P264, P270, P271, P280, P284, P301+P310, P302+P350, P304+P340, P310, P320, P321, P330, P361, P363, P403+P233, P405, P501
- Except where otherwise noted, data are given for materials in their standard state (at 25 °C [77 °F], 100 kPa). verify (what is ?) Infobox references

Cinobufagin is a cardiotoxic bufanolide steroid secreted by the Asiatic toad Bufo gargarizans. It has similar effects to digitalis and is used in traditional Chinese medicine.

== Isolation and purification ==
Cinobufagin, as well as other bufadienolides, can be isolated from the traditional Chinese medicine called ChanSu. ChanSu is made from a multitude of chemicals present in Bufo gargarizans secretions. Resibufogenin can be eluted out with silica gel column chromatography, using a 5:1 ratio of cyclohexane to acetone for the solvent in the mobile phase. Subsequently, cinobufagin and bufalin can be separated and purified using an HPLC column with a 72:28 methanol to water solvent. Yang et al. confirmed this method of isolation for cinobufagin with proton NMR.

== Clinical significance ==
Cinobufagin has been shown to have clinical applications in cancer treatment as well as immunomodulatory and analgesic properties.

In human adrenocortical cells, cinobufagin inhibits the secretion of aldosterone and cortisol. Cinobufagin is able to inhibit the expression of the StAR protein as well as bind the transcription factor SF-1, which normally binds to the promoter for the StAR gene. This results in less StAR protein product and decreased levels of aldosterone and cortisol synthesis. Cinobufagin first binds to a Ca^{2+}/K^{+} plasma membrane ATPase, subsequently inducing the phosphorylation of extracellular signal-regulated kinases (ERK). Phosphorylated ERK then blocks the SF-1 transcription factor from binding to the promoter region of the StAR gene.

Thus, cinobufagin plays important roles in regulation of steroid synthesis and gene expression. It is speculated that cinobufagin may have therapeutic roles in treatment of Cushing's syndrome and heart failure.

=== Immunology ===
In vitro, cinobufagin can stimulate the proliferation of immune cells including splenocytes, peritoneal macrophages, T helper cells and cytotoxic T cells. Additionally cinobufagin can modulate levels of cytokines produced by immune cells. Exposure to cinobufagin increases levels of interferon gamma and tumor necrosis factor alpha while decreasing overall levels of interleukin 4 and interleukin 10.

=== Analgesic properties ===
Cinobufagin has been shown to increase pain threshold levels in mice to thermal and mechanical stimuli. It is thought to trigger increased synthesis of β-END and the up-regulation of the mu opioid receptor in mouse tumor tissue thereby leading to pain relief. β-END binds the mu opioid receptor to cause the analgesic effect.

=== Interaction with cancer cells and related biochemical pathways ===
C. elegans can catabolize cinobufagin into five distinct metabolites, each of which has been shown to have cytotoxic effects to HeLa cancer cells.

Cinobufagin can induce cell cycle arrest at the G2 and M phases as well as induce apoptosis in osteosarcoma cells. Potentially, cinobufagin could be used to stop proliferation of osteosarcoma cells as well as to induce apoptosis them. At the protein level, cinobufagin treated osteosarcoma cells showed an increase in the Bax and cleaved-PARP apoptotic proteins, while inhibiting the GSK-3β/NF-κB signaling pathway.

With regards to the induction of apoptosis, cinobufagin has been shown to selectively bind K^{+}/Na^{+} ATPases in canine kidney cells to trigger a signaling cascade which leads to caspase dependent pathways for apoptosis. It is through the activation of caspases that Cinobufagin can cause apoptosis.
