= Bufanolide =

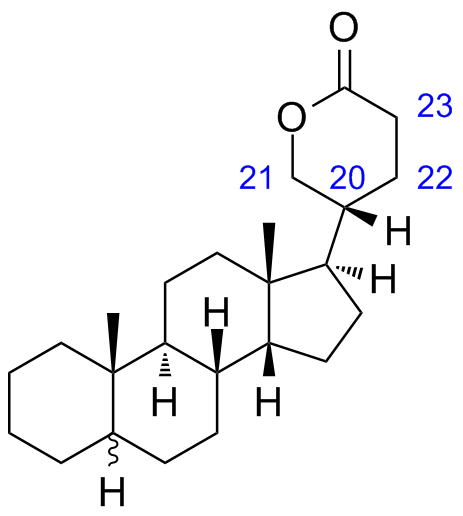

Names
- IUPAC name 5ξ-Bufanolide
- Systematic IUPAC name (5R)-5-[(1R,3aR,3bR,5aΞ,9aS,9bS,11aS)-9a,11a-Dimethylhexadecahydro-1H-cyclopenta[a]phenanthren-1-yl]oxan-2-one

Identifiers
CAS Number	29565-35-3
3D model (JSmol)	Interactive image; Interactive image
ChemSpider	102963
PubChem CID	115047
CompTox Dashboard (EPA)	DTXSID70276154
- InChI: InChI=1S/C24H38O2/c1-23-13-4-3-5-17(23)7-8-18-20-10-9-19(16-6-11-22(25)26-15-16)24(20,2)14-12-21(18)23/h16-21H,3-15H2,1-2H3/t16-,17?,18-,19+,20+,21-,23-,24+/m0/s1 Key: PXOHOSHERMSUCD-YQMMVUDVSA-N
- SMILES: CC12CCCCC1CCC3C2CCC4(C3CCC4C5CCC(=O)OC5)C; C[C@]12CC[C@H]3[C@H]([C@H]1CC[C@@H]2[C@H]4CCC(=O)OC4)CCC5[C@@]3(CCCC5)C

Properties
Chemical formula	C_{24}H_{38}O_{2}
Molar mass	358.28718
- Except where otherwise noted, data are given for materials in their standard state (at 25 °C [77 °F], 100 kPa). Infobox references

Bufanolide is a C24 steroid and, indirectly, a parent structure of bufadienolide. Its derivatives was found in Bufo and Scilla, as an aglycone of cardiac glycosides and is usually toxic.
