= Cane toads in Australia =

Invasive species of toad

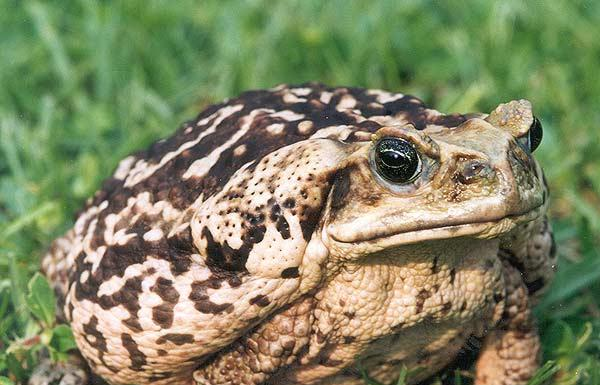
A light-coloured cane toad

The cane toad (Rhinella marina, formerly Bufo marinus) in Australia is regarded as an exemplary case of an invasive species. Australia's relative isolation prior to European colonisation and the Industrial Revolution, both of which dramatically increased traffic and import of novel species, allowed development of a complex, interdepending system of ecology, but one which provided no natural predators for many of the species subsequently introduced. The sudden inundation of foreign species has led to severe breakdowns in Australian ecology, after overwhelming proliferation of a number of introduced species, for which the continent has no efficient natural predators or parasites, and which displace native species; in some cases, these species are physically destructive to habitat, as well. Cane toads have been very successful as an invasive species, having become established in more than 15 countries within the past 150 years. In the Environment Protection and Biodiversity Conservation Act 1999, the Australian government listed the impacts of the cane toad as a "key threatening process".

== History ==
=== Introduction and spread ===
Native to South and mainland Middle America, imported cane toads had been used in Puerto Rico to control sugar cane pests since 1920, and an influential 1932 research paper by Raquel Dexter showed that they largely ate beetle larvae that in turn ate sugar cane. Based on her findings, they were introduced to Hawaii by Cyril Pemberton in the early 1930s, and then introduced to Australia from Hawaii in June 1935 by the Bureau of Sugar Experiment Stations, now Sugar Research Australia, in an attempt to control the native grey-backed cane beetle (Dermolepida albohirtum) and French's beetle (Lepidiota frenchi). Those beetles are native to Australia and they are detrimental to sugarcane crops, which are a major source of income for Australia. Adult cane beetles eat the leaves of the crop, but the main problem is the larvae, which feed on the roots. Adult cane beetles have a heavy exoskeleton and their eggs and larvae are often buried underground, making them difficult to exterminate. Furthermore, conventional methods of pest control, such as pesticide use, would have undesirable effects like eradicating harmless species of insects as well. Cane toads were to replace the use of pesticides, such as arsenic, pitch, and copper. The success of using the moth Cactoblastis cactorum in controlling prickly pears in Australia led to the hope that the cane toad would perform a similar function.

In June 1935, 102 cane toads were imported to Gordonvale from Hawaii, with one dying in transit due to dehydration. By March 1937, some 62,000 toadlets were bred in captivity and then released in areas around Cairns, Gordonvale, and Innisfail in northern Queensland. More toads were released around Ingham, Ayr, Mackay, and Bundaberg. Releases were temporarily limited because of environmental concerns, but resumed in other areas after September 1936.

Since their release, toads have rapidly multiplied. By 2011 they were estimated to number over 200 million and have been known to spread diseases, thereby affecting local biodiversity. Not only has the introduction of the toads caused significant environmental detriment, but there is no evidence that they have affected the number of cane beetles which they were introduced to prey upon.

The spread of cane toads was slow at first but, by 1959, they had colonized most of Queensland's east coast. In 1964, they appeared in the Gulf of Carpentaria. By 1978, they had reached the border of New South Wales, and by 1984 they had reached the Queensland/Northern Territory border. In March 2001, the invasion front entered the wetlands of the heritage-listed Kakadu National Park and by 2009 the toads were close to the Northern Territory/Western Australian border. By 2011 they had become established in irrigation areas around Kununurra, in WA's north.

They have also spread south into northern New South Wales, with one isolated community in Port Macquarie. An isolated colony found in 2010 in the south of Sydney, at Taren Point, was later eradicated. By 2019, they had become a pest in the Torres Strait Islands, probably carried there by boat. By 2022 cane toads had been sighted as far south as Bankstown, southwest of Sydney. In 2023 cane toads were found in Dural, northwest of Sydney.

The toads on the western frontier of their advance have evolved larger legs, which is thought to be related to their ability to travel farther. As a consequence of their longer legs, larger bodies, and faster movement, about 10% of the leading-edge cane toads have also developed arthritis. The toads were estimated to be advancing the frontier at a rate if 40 km (25 mi) per year in 1994, and in 2014 the rate of advance was estimated to have risen to 60 km (37 mi) per year on the western front.

In 2023, rangers discovered a female cane toad in Conway National Park in north Queensland which, recorded unofficially at 25 cm and 2.7 kg and dubbed 'Toadzilla', may be the largest ever seen. This specimen has been preserved for display at the Queensland Museum.

== Ecological effects ==
The spread of the cane toads in Australia from 1940 to 1980 in five-year intervals

The long-term effects of toads on the Australian environment are difficult to determine, but some effects include "the depletion of native species that die eating cane toads; the poisoning of pets and humans; depletion of native fauna preyed on by cane toads; and reduced prey populations for native insectivores, such as skinks."

Precipitous declines in populations of the northern quoll, Mertens' water monitor, and Mitchell's water monitor have been observed after toads have invaded an area, causing them to become endangered. A number of cases of declines in goanna and snake populations have been reported after the arrival of toads. For example, local populations of yellow-spotted monitor dropped by up to 90% when their habitat was invaded by cane toads. The preliminary risk assessment of cane toads in Kakadu National Park stated that the predation of the cane toad by native wildlife is the greatest risk to biodiversity. Other factors, such as competition with native wildlife for resources, and the predation of the cane toad on native wildlife, were considered much lower risk factors, but requiring further study. In the Northern Territory, goanna deaths resulting from poisoning after predation on cane toads has been linked to a rise in the number of undamaged saltwater crocodile eggs. Cane toads were present within a few days of the crocodiles hatching in April 2007.

Numerous native species have been reported as successfully preying on toads. Some birds, such as the black kite (Milvus migrans), have learned to attack the toad's belly, avoiding the poison-producing glands on the back of the head. There are numerous reports of Ibis picking up cane toads in their beaks, flicking them about, washing them and then eating them. Anecdotal reports in the Northern Territory suggest that a native frog, Dahl's aquatic frog (Litoria dahlii), is able to eat the tadpoles and live young of the toad without being affected by the poison that often kills other predators. This may account for slower than expected infestations of toads in certain areas of the Northern Territory, although later research carried out jointly by several Australian Universities casts doubt on these reports. Some snake species have been reported to have adapted smaller jaws so that they are unable to swallow large cane toads, which have large quantities of poison.

Another study, however, notes that the cane toad is adapting to a wider environmental range and may in the future be spreading into habitats currently not available.

In 2009, the native meat ant was found to be immune to the toad's poison and can successfully prey upon young cane toads. Whereas native frogs and toads have natural reflexes to avoid the meat ants, the cane toads do not tend to try to escape the ants, rather standing still when attacked waiting for the toxin to kill the attacker.

New research has indicated that cane toads prey on dung beetles by nestling in cow pats and waiting for the beetles, eating up to 150 in one meal. In areas where cane toads have free access to water in dams, the dung beetles have been decimated. This indicates that the cane toad has the potential to economically affect the cattle industry through increased disease in cattle.

=== Predator effects ===
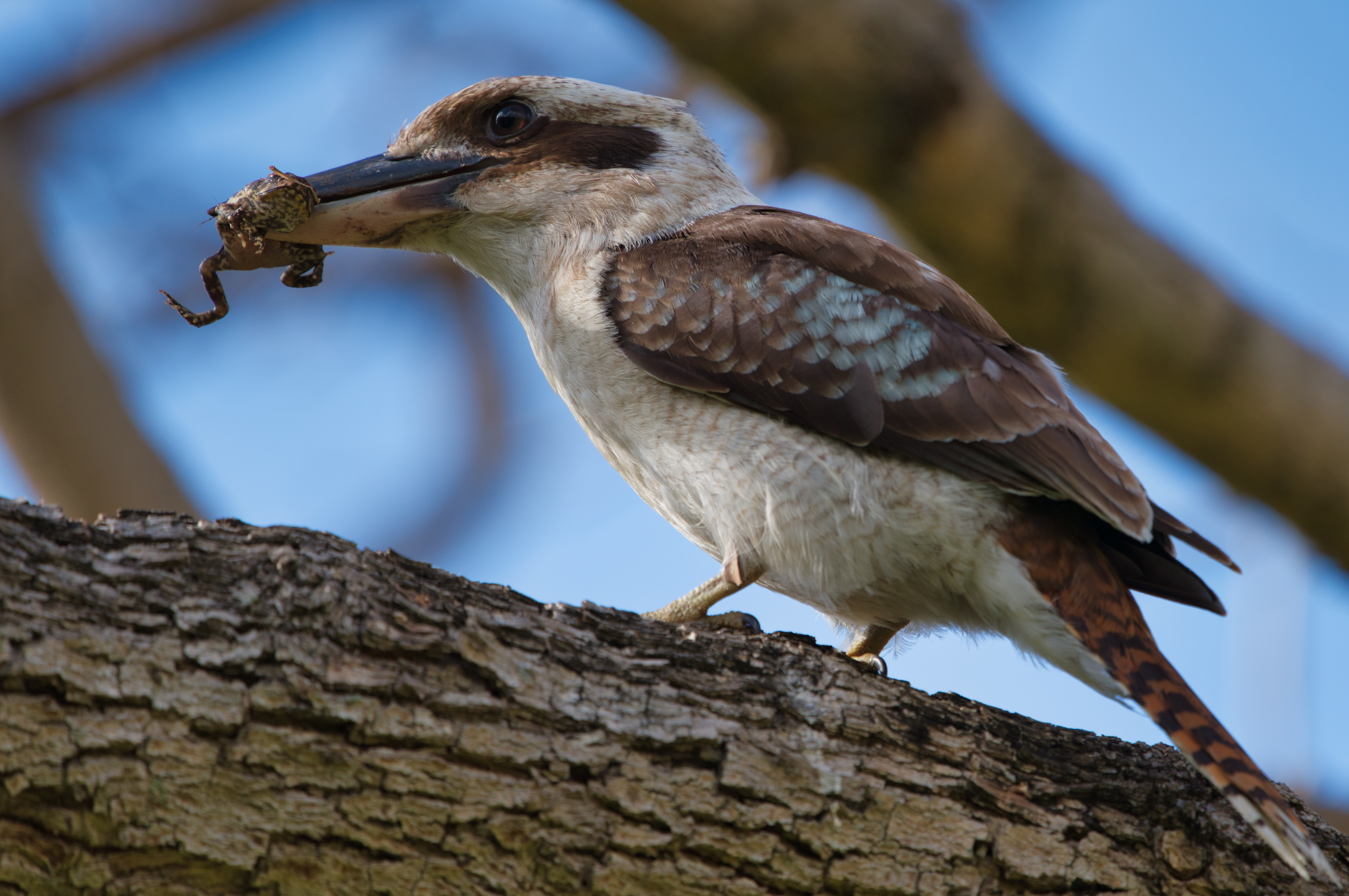
Laughing kookaburra with a juvenile cane toad.

Predators in Australia are not adapted to the cane toad's toxin, which is its main defense mechanism. Because of this, toads do not tend to hide and are usually targeted by predators, which then expose themselves to the toxic effects. One study suggests Australian reptiles are greatly threatened by invasion of the cane toad, more so than any other group. Two species of crocodiles and around 70 species of freshwater turtles were found to be at risk of invasion, and all species studied were found capable of eating a toad large enough to kill them. All freshwater turtles and crocodiles are predicted to share part of their future distribution with the invasive species by 2030. Australia's varanids and agamids are also at a great risk.

One native freshwater turtle species, Myuchelys latisternum (saw-shelled turtle), which ranges along rivers and streams from Cape York Peninsula to northern New South Wales, is reported to be one of the few native animals that is a successful predator of cane toads. The larger the animal, or predator, is the better chance it has of survival, as its body weight effectively dilutes the concentration of the toxin in its body. There are reports of one native species, the Torresian crow, eating cane toads without ingesting the poison by flipping it onto its back and eating its non-toxic innards via its underside. In 2014, researchers found evidence that the Australian freshwater crocodile (Crocodylus johnstoni) had learned to eat just the hind legs of cane toads. One research study concluded that in less than 75 years, the red-bellied black snake had evolved in toad-inhabited regions of Australia to have increased resistance to toad toxin and decreased preference for toads as prey.

Evidence exists for native predator species adapting to the presence of the cane toad, through learning or evolutionary selection, but the initial drop in population is often steep and can reduce biodiversity on a population level. One proposed solution is to use "teacher toads", or smaller toads that are less likely to kill predators. These toads would allow predators to learn not to eat the toads while mitigating mortality. Some have even proposed adding some chemical to make the toads distasteful to further discourage predation. These efforts have shown some promising results so far.

A study to be published in the Ecology journal states that the invasion of cane toads in a case study area caused a trophic cascade over a period of five years. The resident predators, the monitor lizards, ate the cane toads and died, which resulted in a boom in the population of the lizards' typical prey, crimson finches.

Richard Shine is using behavioural conditioning techniques to teach the northern quoll to avoid cane toads.

In 2019, the native rakali or Australian water rats (Hydromys chrysogaster) were found to have learned to make an incision to eat the cane toads' hearts and livers, while avoiding their lethal skin and glands. The water rats were able to adapt the hunting strategies within two years of the cane toads' introduction into their territory.

It has been found that in Australia, cane toad tadpoles eat cane toad eggs.

=== Methods to control spread of cane toads in Australia ===
Currently, most attempts to decrease the invasion of cane toads have been unsuccessful. Many of these strategies involve the physical trapping of toads, but these methods also capture unintended native species. Since the largest selective pressure on cane toads currently is intraspecies competition, these physical removals often only improve the conditions for untrapped toads. Also, since migration is high, any area purged of toads would most likely be reinvaded quickly.

Many new ideas have been proposed to control the cane toad population. Some have suggested introducing a native viral or bacterial pest of the toads, but this has potential to once again invade native species. Two similar strategies have been proposed, both of which focus on fecundity. One involves the release of sterile males into the population. These males would compete for resources with other males, while themselves not being able to reproduce. A second strategy would be to insert a gene in female toads, which would allow them to only create male offspring. In theory, this would limit the reproductive rates and control the population. Determining the efficacy and dangers of these approaches is difficult, as these methods have never been attempted, especially on a large scale.

On 13 June 2012, news reports cited a new research breakthrough regarding cane toad control. Cane toad tadpoles are attracted to the toxin produced by adults and spawn as they are believed to cannibalize toad spawn as a food source. Researchers used cane toad toxin to successfully lure cane toad tadpoles, implying that in controlled areas, tadpoles could be captured and eradicated.

As of 2024, commercially available cane toad tadpole traps are being produced, with a bait using a lure consisting of a small airstone coated with pheromone extracted from the parotoid gland of the toads, which attracts cane toad tadpoles but not other tadpole species. The traps are placed in the shallow edges of bodies of water, and are able to catch thousands of cane toad tadpoles within hours. Some local and state government bodies have been promoting the usage of such traps by residents to curtail spread of toads without impacting on the tadpoles of other frogs.

In semiarid areas where water is scarce, the construction of toad-proof fences around dams can severely affect toad survival rates by denying them access to water.

The RSPCA has guidelines for the humane culling of cane toads. Inhumane ways are illegal in most states and territories. Due to concerns over potential harm to other Australian wildlife species, the use of Dettol as pest control was banned in Western Australia by the Department of Environment and Conservation in 2011.

Large predators, such as the yellow-spotted monitors and sand goannas, are being fed young, small, cane toads by researchers to create a "food poisoning"-like experience for the predators, in the hope that they will avoid eating adult toads, which might kill them.

Poisonous sausages containing toad meat are being trialed in the Kimberley (Western Australia) to try to protect native animals from cane toads' deadly impact. The Western Australian Department of Environment and Conservation has been working with the University of Sydney to develop baits to train native animals not to eat the toads. By blending bits of toad with a nausea-inducing chemical, the baits train the animals to stay away from the amphibians. Researcher David Pearson says trials run in laboratories and in remote parts of the Kimberley region of WA are looking promising, although the baits will not solve the cane-toad problem altogether. By 2023, field research indicated that the taste aversion project had not been effective in reducing toad-induced northern quoll decline in the Kimberley. In 2025, Colossal Bioscience, as part of their thylacine project, announced a three-year plan to edit genes in the northern quoll that would result in offspring that were highly resistant to cane toad poison, with the end goal being to both protect the species and potentially reduce the number of cane toads.

== Novel uses ==
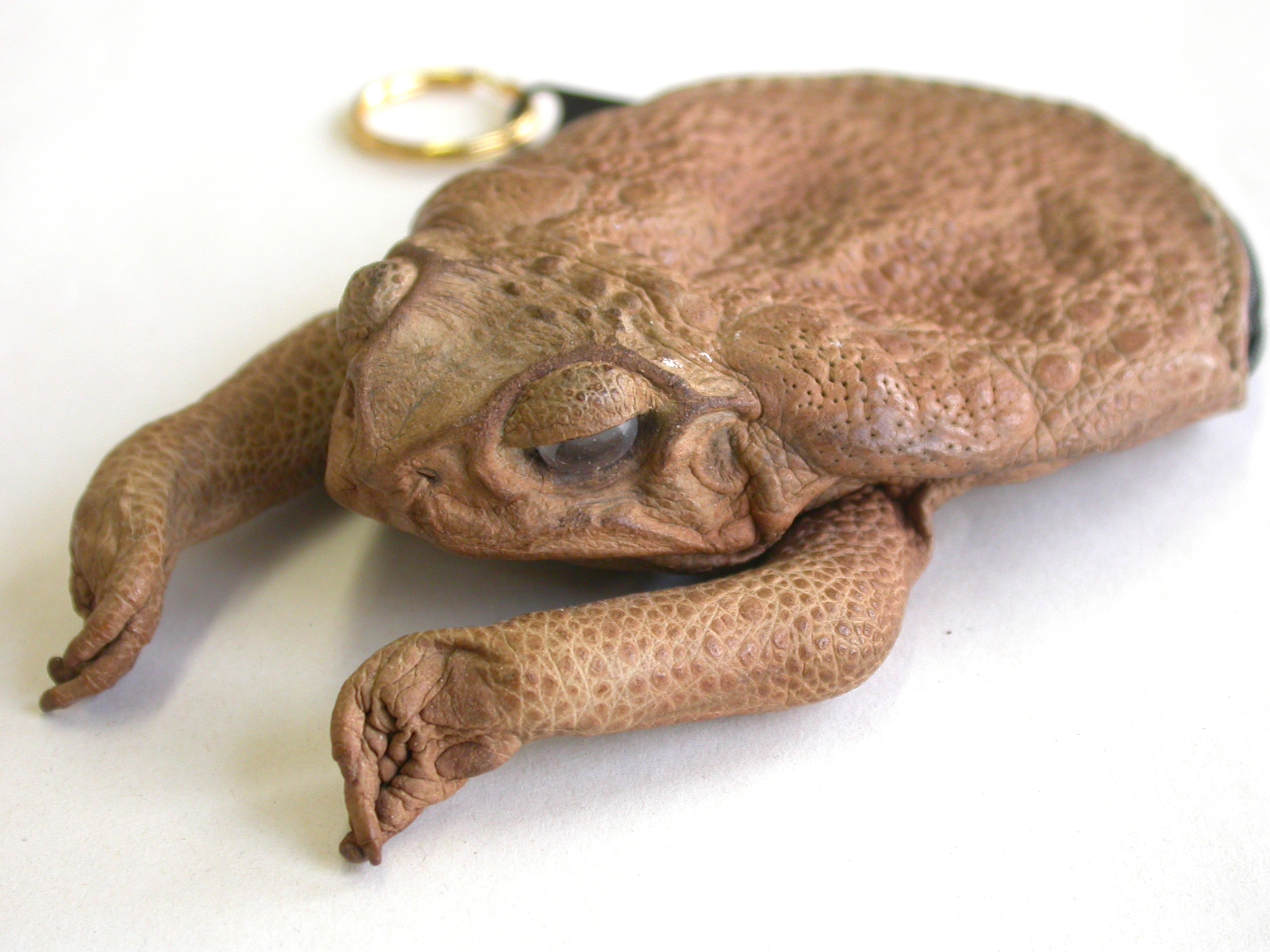
A purse made from a cane toad

Attempts have been made to make use of dead cane toads, which can number in the thousands and cause hygiene problems. This includes processing the carcasses into liquid fertilisers.

Their skin can be made into leather, and novelty cane-toad purses made of the fore body and abdomen have been made. In the Torres Strait Islands, where the toads arrived around 2014, one entrepreneur is tanning the hides to create a durable leather, and creating luxury fashion handbags from the skins.

== In popular culture ==
The cane toad has been listed by the National Trust of Queensland as a state icon of Queensland, alongside the Great Barrier Reef, and past icons, the Royal Flying Doctor Service and the backyard mango tree (also an introduced species).

"Cane toad" is also a colloquial term for an inhabitant of Queensland, particularly the state's State of Origin rugby league team members and supporters.

In Australian states where the cane toad is common, some "sports" have developed, such as cane-toad golf and cane-toad cricket, where cane toads are used as balls. In April 2005, Dave Tollner, a Northern Territory Member of Parliament, called for legalisation of attacks on cane toads. This was criticised by many animal and conservation groups, who claim freezing is a more humane way to kill cane toads than hitting them with cricket bats. Townsville holds an annual "Toad Day Out", where the community learn about and catch cane toads, with prizes for the largest toad caught, and the heaviest weight of toads caught. In 2015, 143.6 kg (317 lb) of toads were caught. In 2016, a drier year, 92 kg (203 lb) of toads were caught. Cane toad races are popular in some towns and pubs. Toads are given humorous names and punters can bid or buy a toad or bet on them as in horse racing. Entrants or the winners commonly have to kiss their toads.

The introduction and subsequent migration of the cane toad in Australia was popularised by the film Cane Toads: An Unnatural History (1988), which tells the tale with a humorous edge and is often shown in environmental science courses. Don Spencer, a popular children's entertainer, sang the song "Warts 'n' All", which was used in the documentary. A longer sequel, Cane Toads: The Conquest, by the same filmmaker, was made in 2010.

The short film Cane Toad – What happened to Baz? displays an Australian attitude towards the cane toad. This film won the "Best Comedy" award at the 2003 St Kilda Film Festival.

A controversial commercial for Tooheys beer company showed people from New South Wales standing at the New South Wales-Queensland border with golf clubs and lights, attracting cane toads just so they could hit them back across the border with the golf clubs.

The Cane Toad Times was a satirical humour magazine based in Brisbane, Queensland.

The invasive nature of cane toads was referenced in The Simpsons episode "Bart vs. Australia". It was also parodied in the episode "Bart the Mother" in which an invasive lizard is dealt with by introducing other species.

In the 2004 video game Ty the Tasmanian Tiger 2: Bush Rescue, created by Australian developer Krome Studios and taking place in a fictional, rural part of the Australian outback called Southern Rivers, one level called "The Wetlands" features large, brutish cane toads as enemies. They make a brief return in the game's 2005 sequel Ty the Tasmanian Tiger 3: Night of the Quinkan in a similarly swampy-themed level.

== See also ==
- Conservation in Australia
- Toad Rage
