= Toad Day Out =

Australian pest control campaign

Toad Day Out is a pest control event which takes place in Queensland, Australia on the 29 March of each year. Its focus is to reduce the population of the invasive cane toad. The toads are caught live and unharmed. The day was originally advocated by politician Shane Knuth. Toads are captured and taken to be humanely destroyed. Prizes are awarded for children who find the heaviest toads, and schools which capture the most toads (by weight). Before they are destroyed, the toads are inspected, weighed and bagged. They are euthanized via exposure to carbon dioxide gas, ensuring a quick and painless death. Most end up being turned into fertilizer, some are used for research, and a few have been stuffed by taxidermists.

The cane toad has been a pest since it was introduced to Australia in 1935 by farmers who hoped the toad would control the spread of the cane beetle. As of 2018, no national eradication program has been implemented due to a lack of resources and technology.

Toad Day Out has been held since 2009. The event was inspired by an episode of The Simpsons called "Whacking Day".

== See also ==
- Conservation in Australia
- Invasive species in Australia
- Cane toads in Australia
