= Water goanna =

Water goanna may refer to:

- Mertens' water monitor, an endangered lizard species in Australia
- Mitchell's water monitor, a critically endangered lizard species in Australia

== See also ==
- Water monitor (disambiguation)
- Asian water monitor, a lizard species in South and Southeast Asia
- Nile monitor, a lizard species in Africa
