= Dermolepida lixi =

Scientific classification
- Kingdom: Animalia
- Phylum: Arthropoda
- Clade: Pancrustacea
- Class: Insecta
- Order: Coleoptera
- Suborder: Polyphaga
- Infraorder: Scarabaeiformia
- Family: Scarabaeidae
- Tribe: Melolonthini
- Genus: Dermolepida
- Species: D. lixi

Binomial name
- Dermolepida lixi (Nonfried, 1894)

Synonyms
- Lepidoderma lixi Nonfried, 1894; Lepidioderma glaber Brenske, 1894

Species of beetle

Dermolepida lixi is a species of beetle of the family Scarabaeidae. It is found in Papua New Guinea and Australia (Queensland).

== Description ==
Adults reach a length of about 28–31 mm (1.1–1.2 in). They are similar to Dermolepida albohirtum, but may be distinguished by the sparseness of white scales on the pronotum and elytra.
