= Raquel Dexter =

Puerto Rican entomologist

Raquel R. Dexter was an entomologist at the University of Puerto Rico known for her influential research on the insect diet of cane toads.

Cane toads had been imported from Barbados to Puerto Rico in 1920, in an attempt to control native beetle larvae (white grubs) that had been devastating the local sugar cane crop. This was largely successful, and in 1932 Dexter presented research showing that the diet of the toads largely consisted of these beetles. Her research became the basis for the large-scale importation of cane toads to Queensland, Australia, where the grubs of a different form of native cane beetle had been devastating sugar crops. However, cane toads in Australia became an ecological catastrophe, as the cane-dwelling Australian beetles were inaccessible to the ground-dwelling toads, and the toads ate other insect species and poisoned other local animals.

Dexter was elected as a Fellow of the American Association for the Advancement of Science in 1954.
