= Water monitor (disambiguation) =

Water monitor is a common name for the Asian water monitor, a lizard species in South and Southeast Asia.

Water monitor may also refer to:

- All monitor lizard species of the subgenus Soterosaurus, with the exception of the black rough-necked monitor.
- Nile monitor, a lizard species in Africa
- Water monitor or fire monitor, alternative names for deluge gun, a large firefighting device
- Mertens' water monitor, lizard species in Australia
- Mitchell's water monitor, lizard species in Australia
