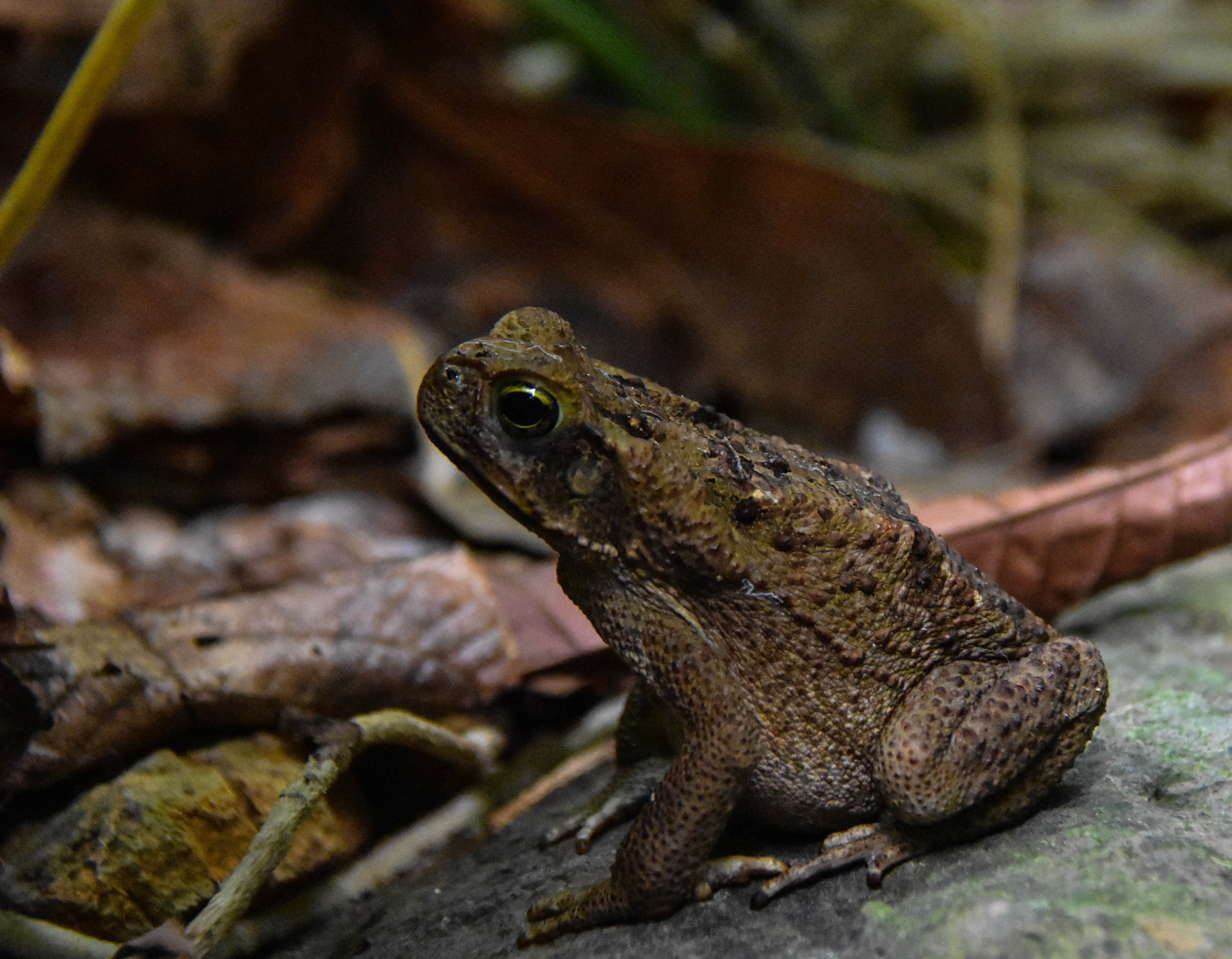

Conservation status
- Least Concern (IUCN 3.1)

Scientific classification
- Kingdom: Animalia
- Phylum: Chordata
- Class: Amphibia
- Order: Anura
- Family: Bufonidae
- Genus: Rhinella
- Species: R. horribilis

Binomial name
- Rhinella horribilis (Wiegmann, 1833)

= Rhinella horribilis =

Species of amphibian

Rhinella horribilis is the scientific name used for populations of the cane toad or giant toad located in Mesoamerica and north-western South America when they are considered to be a separate species from Rhinella marina, a name which is then mostly restricted to Amazon basin populations. R. horribilis was originally described from Mexico as Bufo horribilis before later being considered a synonym of Bufo marina and later Rhinella marina. The specific epithet horribilis has now been revived after a 2016 study argued that these populations make up two separate species.
