= Adaptations of Australian animals to cane toads =

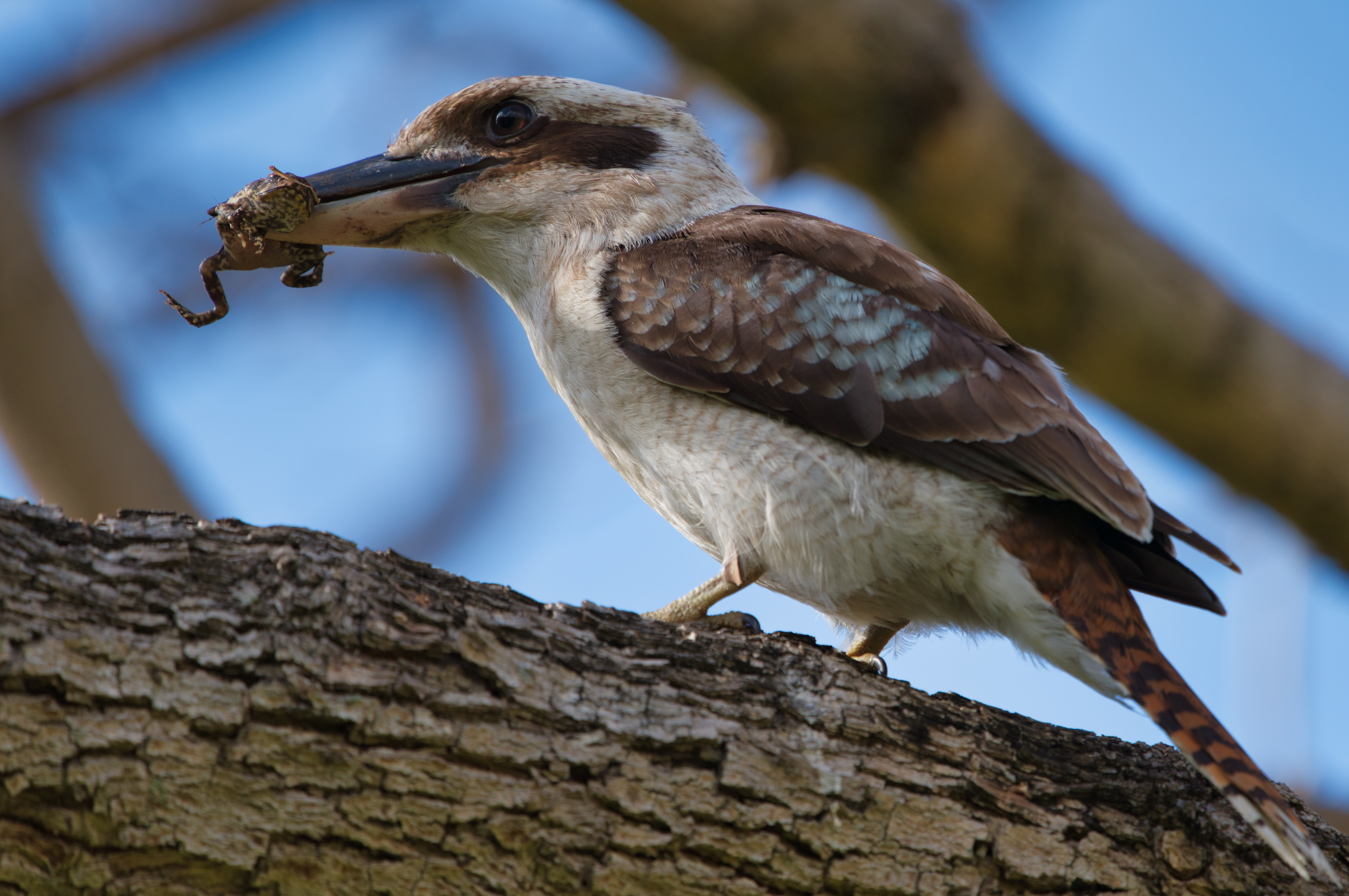
Laughing kookaburra with a juvenile cane toad.

Native to both South and Central America, Cane toads were introduced to Australia in the 1930s and have since become an invasive species and a threat to the continent's native predators and scavengers.

The primary mechanism of impact cane toads have on Australian ecosystems is through poisoning of native species. The parotoid gland on either side of the head of a cane toad secretes a bufotoxin (a mixture of bufadienolides) that is toxic to most animals. This poison does not exist in any native Australian toad or frog; consequently, many Australian native animals that prey on frogs and toads experienced significant population decline immediately following the introduction of this toad species to Australia.

Whilst the invasion of cane toads has had devastating impacts on the populations of native predators in many Australian ecosystems in which the species has spread, it is unlikely that cane toads are solely responsible for the extinction of any native species. Furthermore, many of the populations that initially experienced a decline following the cane toad invasion have subsequently been observed to recover. The persistence of these populations suggests that over time, native predator species have adapted to the presence of the cane toad. Native predators may have adjusted to the ubiquity of these toxic anurans either individually through learning from a survived toad poisoning, or collectively as a result of selective pressure applied by the invader, killing off those individuals prone to incautiously consuming cane toads, before those predators produce offspring with similar inclinations.

== Adaptation through learning ==
One way in which Australian animals have adjusted to the presence of the cane toad is through learned behavioural adaptations. These phenotypically plastic behavioural modifications are usually induced by conditioned taste aversion.

This form of learning has been observed to occur in native toad- and frog-eating ("anurophagous") predators when surviving ill-effects caused by consuming a cane toad result in the predator subsequently intentionally avoiding the poisonous species. Conditioned taste aversion is most effective if the predator is severely, but non-fatally affected from consuming a cane toad. However, in many predatory species the taste of toxins from mouthing a cane toad is sufficiently repulsive to induce subsequent cane toad avoidance: In a learned response to such a noxious experience, the predator will refrain from attacking objects that display the same visual or chemical cues as the poisonous toad.

Rather than avoiding cane toads, some inventive native species have developed new foraging techniques that enable them to exploit cane toads as a food source. This learned behaviour has been observed in predators that have some natural resistance to the cane toad's toxins, including birds and rodents.

=== Taste aversion learning in carnivorous marsupials ===
The planigale is a small carnivorous dasyurid marsupial native to Australia. Similarly to other dasyurids, including quolls and planigales, that have no anciently shared evolutionary history with cane toads, and are highly susceptible to cane toads' toxins. Studies have shown that planigales naïve to the toxic cane toads readily attack cane toads but most often survive the encounter, due to the particular predation techniques typically employed by the small marsupial: Planigales will usually immediately reject a cane toad after capture, or consume only the snout of the toad, such that the poisonous parotoid glands remain untouched. Laboratory tests have shown that planigales learn to avoid cane toads after only one or two encounters. Furthermore, planigales were observed to even reject palatable, non-toxic frog species following an encounter with a cane toad, and also avoided attacking any prey item on which the scent of cane toad had been applied. These findings demonstrate the strength of taste aversion learning in planigales with regards to cane toad.

Whilst aversion learning may initially be important to the survival of naïve planigales, studies have shown that planigales in northern Queensland, having lived sympatrically with cane toads since their introduction over 60 years ago, may have evolved to tolerate cane toad toxins (see below).

=== Avoidance of cane toad tadpoles by predatory fish ===
The highly toxic tadpoles of cane toads represent a threat to native predatory fish. However, some Australian native fish species, which live in sympatry with cane toads and their larvae, have adapted their foraging tactics in response to the presence of cane toad tadpoles: barramundi and the northern gudgeon trout have been observed to selectively choose their prey items and differentiate between toxic cane toad tadpoles and non-toxic tadpoles of other species.

The toxins present in cane toad tadpoles are concentrated in the skin. Therefore, mouthing of a tadpole is sufficient for most predators to detect its toxicity. In laboratory tests, barramundi and northern trout gudgeon rejected cane toad tadpoles immediately after capture. After rejection of the cane toad tadpoles, the fish were observed to shake their heads vigorously. This behaviour was not observed when the fish were fed food pellets or tadpoles of non-toxic species, indicating that the unpalatability of cane toad tadpoles most likely leads to their rejection by predatory fish. The two fish species learned not to prey on cane toad tadpoles after a small number of encounters. Furthermore, most of the fish were able to recognise and avoid the toxic tadpoles, either by visual or chemical cues, several days after their first encounter. With long-term exposure to toad tadpoles and a selection of native tadpoles, northern gudgeon were able to differentiate between the tadpoles of cane toads and native species.

=== Avoidance learning in frogs ===
Native Australian frogs have a low tolerance to cane toad toxins. Whilst the relatively small body size of native frog species compared to adult cane toads prevents native toad-eating species from consuming larger toads, most species will readily prey on toad tadpoles and early juveniles (late-stage metamorphs). At this early stage of development, the young cane toads contain the lowest concentration of toxins. Nonetheless, consumption of recently metamorphosed toads by native frogs is often fatal to the predator. Therefore, the invasion of cane toads constitutes a major threat to native frog and toad populations, especially ground-dwelling species which are most likely to encounter the toxic toads.

Australian marbled frogs have been found to exhibit rapid aversion learning, avoiding predation on edible-sized cane toads subsequently to a previous encounter with the toxic species. Toad-experienced native frogs most likely use both visual and olfactory cues to detect and avoid the toxic species.

In particular, native Australian frog species have been found to avoid the scent of adult cane toad urine. This behaviour is hypothesised to reduce the rate of potentially dangerous encounters with large, more toxic toads. However, similar avoidance behaviour in frogs naïve to cane toads at the toad invasion front, suggests that frogs may simply seek shelter sites free of unfamiliar scents, rather than learning to act to avoid cane toads from olfactory cues.

=== Foraging tactics in birds ===
Australian birds appear to generally be more resistant to cane toad toxins than either reptiles or amphibians. (Note: The common Sunda toad, Duttaphrynus melanostictus, also secretes bufotoxins and is native to southeast Asia. In particular, the also-toxic Sundra toad is native to some Indonesian islands near Australia. Any bird species found in Australia that also have populations native to nearby Sundra toad habitat outside of Australia will have had adequate time to naturally evolve genetic adaptations to the Sundra toad and its toxins. For example, Torresian crows, Corvus orru, are native both to all of northern Australia, and are also found in nearby parts of Indonesia. The toad-adapted non-Australian populations of any Australian species can reliably pass on and sustain genetic adaptations they have developed to their Australian conspecifics with only rare occasional interbreeding between the two subpopulations, requiring only minimal, infrequent sea crossings over the straits that separate the breeding population in Australia from non-Australian population of the same species. It is therefore unsurprising that any Australian species that are also found in Sunda toad habitat would show some pre-adaptation to the similar bufotoxins secreted by the cane toad, Rhinella marina – acquired from the birds' geographically nearby but generationally distant toad-adapted cousins.) As a result, birds are unlikely to be at risk of fatal poisoning from eating cane toads. Cane toads may therefore represent a novel prey type for scavenging or predatory birds, rather than a significant ecological threat.

Moreover, native raptors and some corvid species have been observed to eat cane toads using learned foraging techniques that result in consuming only the toads’ less toxic body parts. This behaviour is most likely caused by the toads’ toxins tasting bad to the birds.

The most notable case of cane toad consumption by birds involves the scavenging of dead ‘road-kill’ toads by raptors, including the black kite and the whistling kite. These birds have learned to eat only the tongue of the toad, leaving the rest of the carcass behind; in this way, the raptors minimise the quantity of toxins ingested. This scavenging behaviour is most common during the dry season, when prey becomes scarcer. In a test conducted by Beckmann & Shine (2010), kites were found to be twice as likely to scavenge dead cane toads in the dry season than in the wet season. Furthermore, the kites preferred frogs to cane toads, and favoured smaller juvenile toads over larger adult toads.

There has been some anecdotal evidence for culturally transmitted predation techniques of cane toads in Torresian crows. Torresian crows appear to have developed a technique to kill and eat cane toads by flipping the toads on their backs and consuming only the internal organs and part of the thighs of the toxic anuran. It is possible that this predation behaviour is culturally transmitted. Torresian crows may learn how to perform the technique by imitating and replicating the behaviour of conspecifics.

Predation on cane toads does not appear to be as common in wading birds, which are reluctant to prey on the toxic species in any of its life stages. Wading birds, including the Nankeen night heron, purple swamphen, pied heron, and little egret, have been shown to avoid consuming cane toads, most likely as a result their bad taste.

=== Consumption of cane toads by native rodent species ===
Rodents are physiologically adapted to handle many plant and animal toxins. Whilst rodents are capable of taste aversion learning, studies have shown that the introduced black rat as well as native rodent species including the dusky rat, pale field rat, grassland melomys, and water rat appear to tolerate cane toad toxins well and therefore readily prey on the invasive species. Laboratory tests showed that even when provided with a non-toxic alternative prey item, the dusky rat and the grassland melomys will still eat cane toads. However, these rodent species are more likely to consume small cane toad tadpoles, rather than the larger juveniles or adults. This selection reflects growth-related change in cane toads' toxicity, whereby cane toad tadpoles have the lowest toxin concentration.

== Adaptation through evolutionary selection ==
Cane toads were introduced into northern Queensland between 1935 and 1937. The population rapidly expanded and the species spread westwards at an initial rate of approximately 15 km per year. Currently, cane toads continue to extend their geographic range across tropical northern Australia, moving increasingly further west at an accelerated rate of 55 km per year.

At the invasion front, interactions occur between the introduced toad and individual native animals which have no ancient evolutionary history shared with the toad. Naive species are more likely react to a first-time encounter in a way detrimental to their fitness, therefore the initial inexperience of native species – with regards to the toxicity of cane toads – makes them particularly susceptible to the potential ecological threat posed by the invasive toads.

However, with time, the evolutionary selective pressures exerted on the native species due to the presence of the cane toad in their shared environment, can induce genetic adaptive shifts. Over many generations, native species may evolve to be able to tolerate ingesting higher concentrations of toad toxins, or develop an innate ability to avoid consuming cane toad toxins. Some snake species have also physically adapted to minimise the likelihood of ingesting lethal quantities of toxin.

Evolutionary selective adaptations are most likely to occur in native species having lived sympatrically with cane toads over longer periods of time. More importantly, this period of sharing the same environment must correspond to many generations in the native species for natural selection to have a substantial effect on population genetics. Consequently, animals with higher reproductive rates and shorter lifespans are more likely to quickly adapt to cane toads through evolutionary selection.

=== Morphological, behavioural, and physiological adaptations in Australian snakes ===
Cane toads are highly toxic to snakes. Since the arrival of cane toads, the populations of many native snake species have dramatically declined (up to 89% for the death adder). For some native snakes an attack on a cane toad is fatal in as many as 50% of encounters.

Snakes have strong negative allometry for head size, meaning that head size is inversely related to body length. Since the maximum gape size of a snake is proportion to the size of its head, larger snakes tend to have reduced gape sizes. Gape size limits the maximum ingestible prey size. Therefore, large snakes with small heads are less likely to consume large cane toads with potentially lethal concentrations of toxin.

Due to the high toxicity of cane toads to snakes, the physical ability to attack toads represents a significant detriment to the snakes' fitness, if coupled with instinctive impulsive attack behavior without any protective avoidance of the fatally toxic prey. Therefore, intraspecific variance in the size of the snake's mouth gape, and hence in their ability to consume a lethal dose of toxin, induces a strong selective pressure for snakes with smaller gape sizes.

Data collected over 80 years from red-bellied black snakes and common tree snakes, shows that the body length of these toad-vulnerable species increases with the time since first exposure to the toxic toads; mouth gape size decreases correspondingly with increasing body length. Conversely, some species at a lower risk from cane toads, such as the marsh snake and the keelback snake, show no significant variation in body proportions over time.

The arrival of cane toads has also exerted selection pressures on the feeding behaviour and toxin tolerance of snakes: Red-bellied black snakes from regions where cane toads are long-established have developed increased resistance to toad toxins. Furthermore, the presence of cane toads has induced genetically based behavioural adaptations in this snake species: Individuals from toad-exposed regions show an innate disinclination to prey on cane toads. These adaptive responses appear likely to have occurred in less than 23 black snake generations, demonstrating the strong selection pressures brought by the cane toad.

=== Increased tolerance of cane toad toxins in planigales ===
Studies have shown the aversion-learning by planigales (small shrew-like carnivorous marsupials), who avoid cane toads as prey upon initial contact with the toxic species. In the longer term, planigale populations exposed to cane toads over many generations have been able to physiologically adapt to prey on cane toads, exhibiting a higher tolerance to the toad's toxins.

=== Cane toads as a novel food source for predatory arthropods ===
Unlike native frog species which have co‑evolved alongside their Australian toad-eating predators over millions of years, some of the traits of the relatively recently introduced cane toad are poorly adapted for avoiding predation from Australian predators.

Cane toads are especially susceptible to native arthropods, which do not appear to experience any adverse effects from ingesting cane toad toxins. Cane toad land-adapted late-stage tadpoles (metamorphs) are particularly vulnerable to attack by meat ants, which have been observed to kill many small toads around water bodies in tropical northern Australia. Toads are at an increased risk of encountering meat ants, compared to native frogs because they are diurnal – rather than nocturnal like most native frogs – and cane toads' preference for open spaces where the predatory ants are most common. Furthermore, toads fail to effectively recognize and evade meat ants, principally due to a maladaptive trait whereby toads adopt an ineffective "freeze" defence mechanism when attacked. The immobility of cane toads when attacked is futile response to the meat ants, which proceed to consume the toads alive. A study by Ward-Fear, Brown & Shine (2010) found that meat ants could severely injure toad metamorphs within 5 seconds, and that more than 80% of ant attacks were fatal.

A phylogenetically diverse range of other native arthropods including fishing spiders, water beetles, water scorpions and dragonfly nymphs have also been observed to prey on cane toads metamorphs. In particular, dragonfly nymphs and fishing spiders selectively attack toads over native frog species.
