= Dermolepida =

Scientific classification
- Kingdom: Animalia
- Phylum: Arthropoda
- Clade: Pancrustacea
- Class: Insecta
- Order: Coleoptera
- Suborder: Polyphaga
- Infraorder: Scarabaeiformia
- Family: Scarabaeidae
- Subfamily: Melolonthinae
- Tribe: Melolonthini
- Genus: Dermolepida; Arrow, 1941

Synonyms
- Lepidoderma Waterhouse, 1875

Genus of beetles

Dermolepida is a genus of beetles belonging to the family Scarabaeidae.

== Species ==
- Dermolepida albohirtum (Waterhouse, 1875)
- Dermolepida annulitarse (Heller, 1914)
- Dermolepida cyclops Britton, 1957
- Dermolepida lixi (Nonfried, 1894)
- Dermolepida meeki Britton, 1957
- Dermolepida nigrum (Nonfried, 1894)
- Dermolepida noxium Britton, 1957
- Dermolepida papuanum (Brenske, 1895)
- Dermolepida pica (Arrow, 1916)
- Dermolepida uniforme (Fairmaire, 1879)
