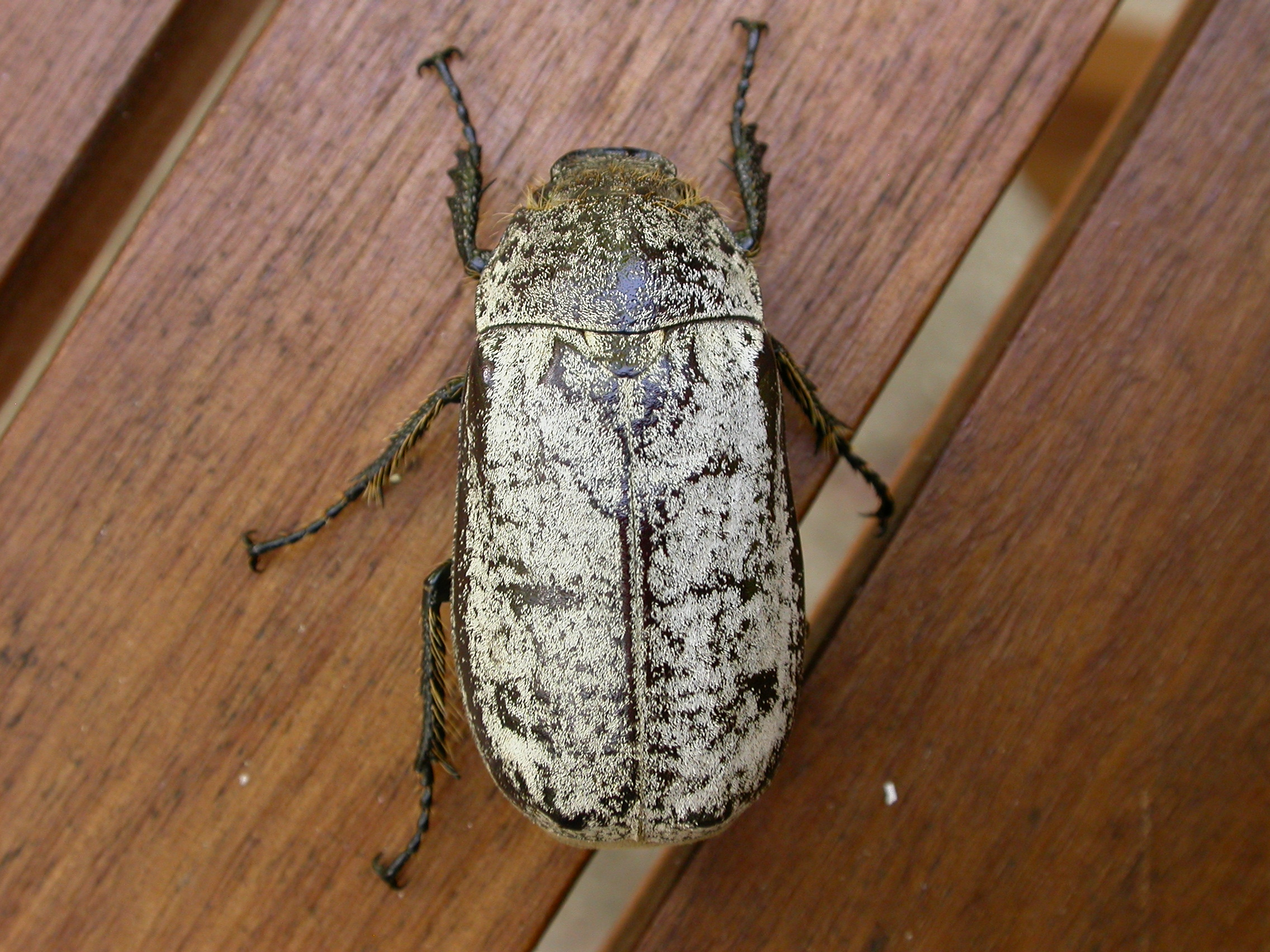

Scientific classification
- Kingdom: Animalia
- Phylum: Arthropoda
- Clade: Pancrustacea
- Class: Insecta
- Order: Coleoptera
- Suborder: Polyphaga
- Infraorder: Scarabaeiformia
- Family: Scarabaeidae
- Tribe: Melolonthini
- Genus: Dermolepida
- Species: D. albohirtum

Binomial name
- Dermolepida albohirtum (C.O.Waterhouse, 1875)

Synonyms
- Lepidoderma albohirtum Waterhouse, 1875; Lepidioderma lansbergei Brenske, 1894; Lepidioderma waterhousei Brenske, 1894; Rhopaea aruensis Lansberge, 1879

= Dermolepida albohirtum =

Cane beetle, Australia native pest

Dermolepida albohirtum, the cane beetle, is a native Australian beetle and a pest of sugarcane. Adult beetles eat the leaves of sugarcane, but greater damage is done by their larvae hatching underground and eating the roots, which either kills or stunts the growth of the plant. The beetles can also be found in the Philippines and are known there by the local name salagubang.

== Lifecycle ==
Adult cane beetles are white with speckles of black. Female cane beetles lay their eggs in the soil of sugarcane about 20 to 45 cm (8 to 18 in) deep, generally choosing the base of the tallest cane. A female beetle can lay up to three clutches with 20–30 eggs per clutch. Larvae, which are known as "greyback cane grubs", are small and white.

The cane beetle grub feeds on the roots of the sugarcane during all three stages of its life. The crucial stage occurs during February to May, when it aggressively feeds on the sugarcane's roots, causing the most damage to the plant. Once it is fully fed, after 3–4 months, the grub burrows down to turn into a pupa. The pupa develops into an adult within a month, but does not emerge from the soil until the weather conditions are adequate.

== Pest control efforts ==
Methods of control include applications of Metarhizium anisopliae, along with other biocontrol strategies, but pest control against cane beetles also damages a large variety of other insects and invertebrates that can be beneficial to the ecosystem, thus preventing their use. The introduction of the cane toad to Australia was a biocontrol attempt.

=== Cane toad introduction ===
The greyback cane beetle was, along with the Frenchi cane beetle, Lepidiota frenchi, the reason that the cane toad (Rhinella marina) was introduced to Australia. The toad was brought in as a biological control to protect sugarcane crops. While introduced cane toads did eat cane beetles, the toads preferred other insects, and R. marina itself became a major pest.

The toad population rose exponentially. Native predators such as quolls (Dasyurus, "marsupial cat") neither possess resistance to its toxins nor have learned avoidance; thus, these predators became locally extinct upon arrival of toads and suffered overall population declines – up to 97% for the northern quoll.
