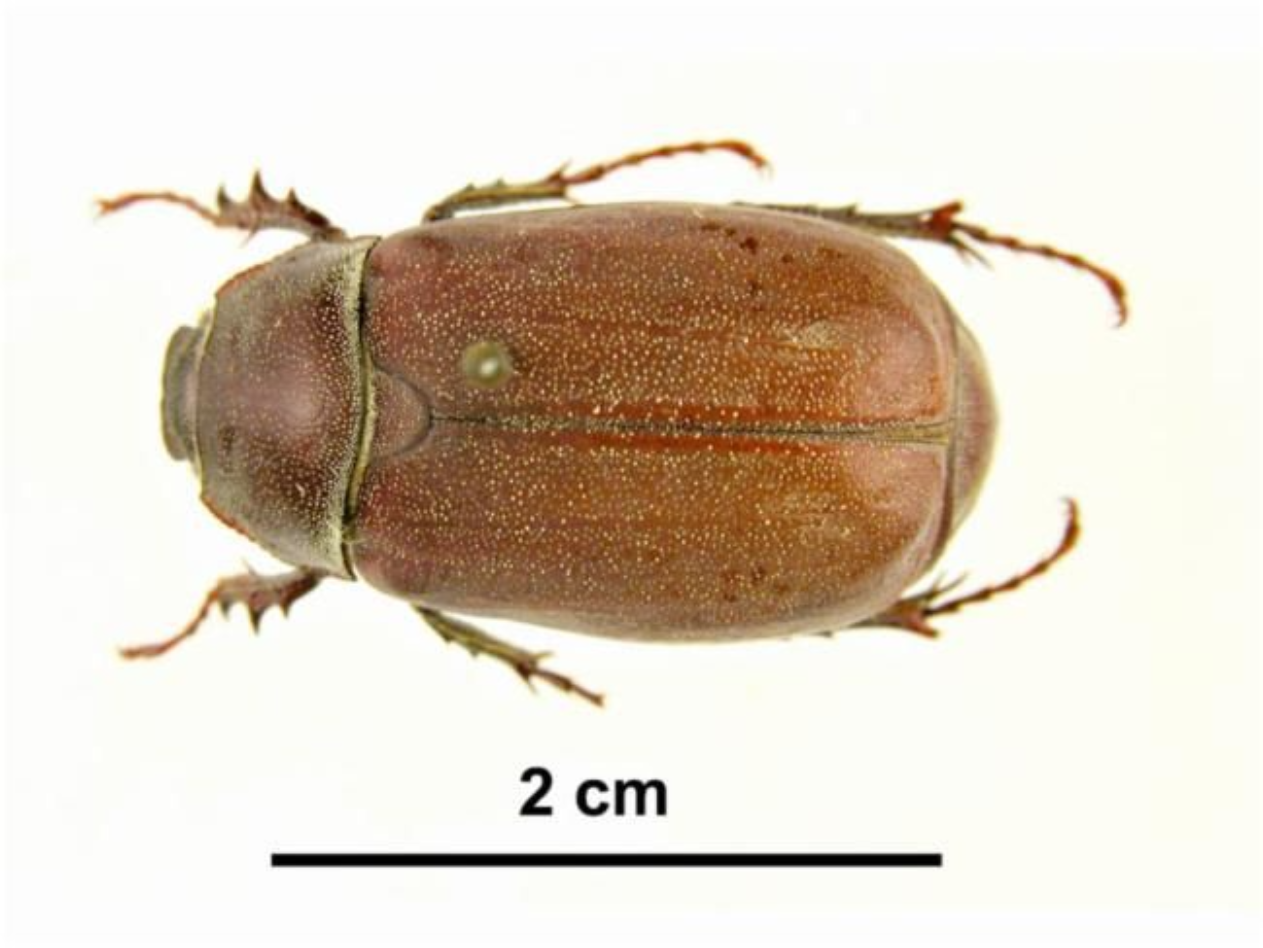

Scientific classification
- Kingdom: Animalia
- Phylum: Arthropoda
- Clade: Pancrustacea
- Class: Insecta
- Order: Coleoptera
- Suborder: Polyphaga
- Infraorder: Scarabaeiformia
- Family: Scarabaeidae
- Genus: Lepidiota
- Species: L. frenchi

Binomial name
- Lepidiota frenchi Blackburn, 1912

= Lepidiota frenchi =

Species of beetle

Lepidiota frenchi, French's canegrub, is a species of beetle of the family Scarabaeidae. It is found in Australia (coastal Queensland and the Torres Strait Islands).

== Description ==
Adults reach a length of about 22–29 mm (0.87–1.14 in). The body is reddish brown with white scales. The scales on the disc of the pronotum are mostly sparse, but dense along the posterior margin and along the lateral margins. The elytra have round white scales.

== Life history ==
They are considered a major pest of sugar cane.
