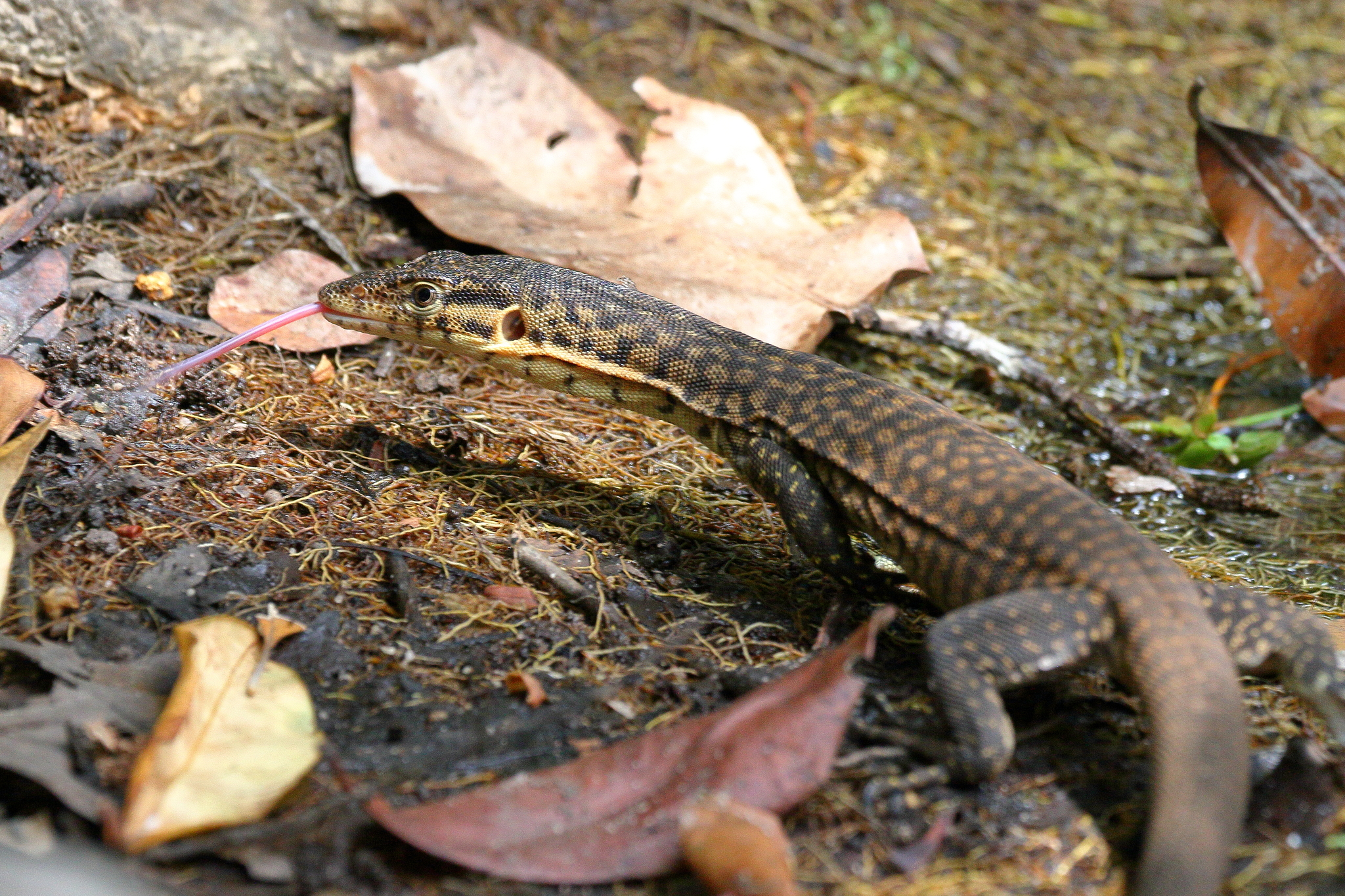

Conservation status
- Critically Endangered (IUCN 3.1)

Scientific classification
- Kingdom: Animalia
- Phylum: Chordata
- Order: Squamata
- Suborder: Anguimorpha
- Family: Varanidae
- Genus: Varanus
- Subgenus: Odatria
- Species: V. mitchelli

Binomial name
- Varanus mitchelli Mertens, 1958
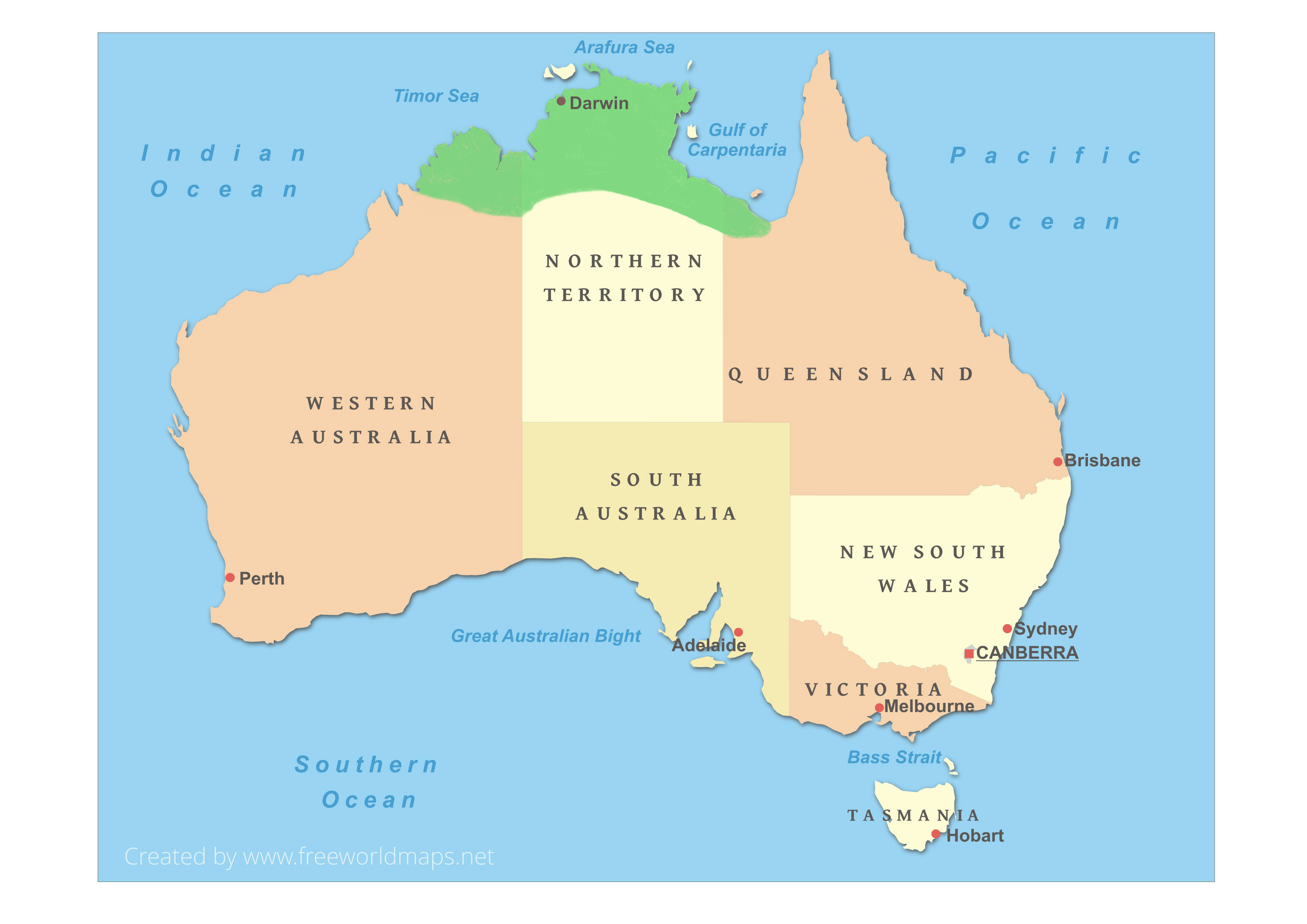
- Range in green

= Mitchell's water monitor =

Species of lizard

Mitchell's water monitor (Varanus mitchelli) is a semiaquatic species of monitor lizard in the family Varanidae. The species is native to Australia, where it is found in the northern regions. It is on the IUCN Red List as a "Critically Endangered" species. It can be distinguished by the orange or yellow stripes along its neck and dark spots along its back. It is mainly carnivorous and eats small prey such as lizard, birds, and insects.

== Etymology ==
The specific name, mitchelli, as well as the common name, Mitchell's water monitor, are in honor of Australian herpetologist Francis John Mitchell (1929–1970) of the South Australian Museum. The generic name, Varanus, is a Latinization of the Arabic word for monitor lizard, waran. The species (along with other Australian monitor lizard species) is colloquially referred to as a goanna in Australia, a name which likely came from the word iguana as the lizards looked like the iguanas of South America to the first European settlers of Australia.

== Description ==
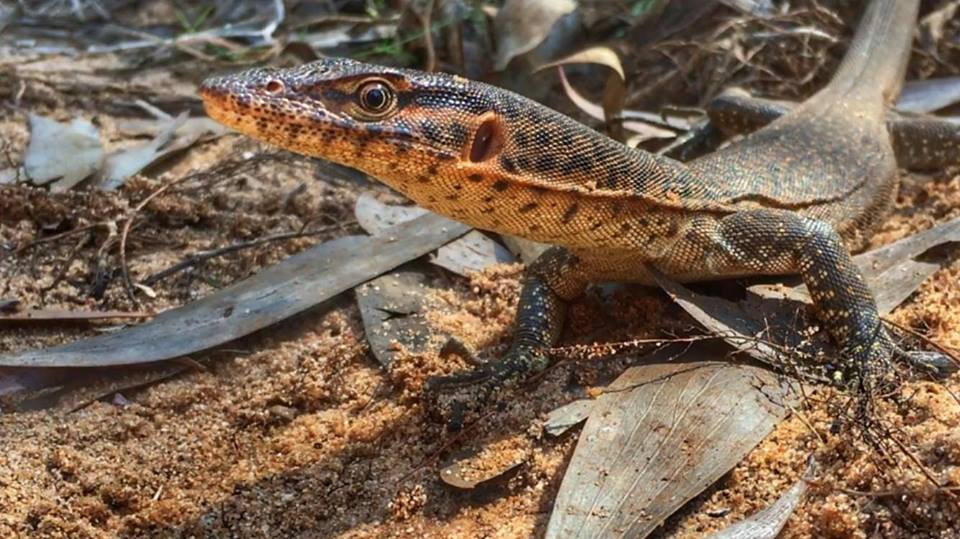
Mitchell's water monitor has yellow and orange stripes down its sides and neck.

Mitchell's water monitor reaches a total length (tail included) of up to 70 cm (28 in). It has a long, slender neck and a pointed head. It is generally dark brown or black and has small yellow and white spots covering the limbs and head, and ocelli with dark centers as well as yellow stripes along its side. The skin is rough, with many wrinkles. Its underside is a light cream color.

Monitor lizards (including Mitchell's water monitor) have excellent eyesight, but are "night blind" in the dark. The lizards' retinas do not have rods, the receptor cells for night vision.

== Geographic range ==
Mitchell's water monitor lives along all northern river systems in the Kimberly Region of Western Australia and the Northern Territory. There is no data to suggest that it lives on any islands surrounding Australia.

== Habitat ==
Mitchell's water monitor inhabits swamps, lagoons, inland rivers, and other bodies of water and is often found on trees near the water. It prefers to climb trees to shelter in tree hollows or under bark. If disturbed, it will head to the water. Varanus mitchelli frequently basks on rocks near the water.

== Reproduction ==
Mitchell's water monitor is oviparous. It breeds during the dry season, with the females laying eggs between April and June. Clutch sizes have been recorded from 3 to 12. Breeding behaviors are found to be similar to those of other species of monitor lizards. Varanus mitchelli lives around 10 years.

== In captivity ==
Mitchell's water monitor is reported to be nervous and shy. It is rarely kept in captivity. Average clutch sizes for Varanus mitchelli are between 3 and 11 eggs, though it can lay up to 20 in captivity. It is found to be easily bred in captivity.

Mitchell's water monitor grows to over 2 feet (60 cm) in total length (tail included) and requires a large bioactive enclosure. Recommendations of 8x4x4 ft (2.4x1.2x1.2 m) are not uncommon, especially if attempting to breed. Providing a seasonal environment and food to mimic natural behaviors is said to be the best onset for breeding. However, these requirements can be difficult to achieve and reduce its appearance in captivity.

== Diet ==
Mitchell's water monitor preys on smaller animals of both terrestrial and aquatic origin. Its prey includes smaller lizards, small mammals, nestling birds, reptile eggs, and terrestrial invertebrates (orthopterans, arachnids, beetles, etc.). Aquatic prey include fish, crabs and frogs. Its diet changes seasonally according to flooding during the wet season.

== Conservation ==
=== Threats ===
The current most significant threat to Mitchell's water monitor is the spread of cane toads across the Northern Territory in Australia. Though toads and frogs are a part of their diet, cane toads are poisonous to Mitchell's water monitor and many other water monitor species. Cane toads have become an invasive species in Australia since their introduction to the area in 1935; because of that, Australia is said to be currently facing an overpopulation of cane toads, which presents a problem for monitor lizards that mistake the poisonous amphibians for endemic toads native to Australia that make up the lizards' usual diet. The geographic range of cane toads completely overlaps the geographic range of Mitchell's water monitor. Not all cane toads are entirely lethal as the smaller ones have non-lethal doses of poison compared to the larger toads; despite this, Mitchell's water monitor and other monitors will go after the larger toads that contain lethal doses.

Other threats to Mitchell's water monitor include habitat loss due to land clearing, habitat degradation and change due to climate change and deaths occurring from contact with humans (such as death on roads). Mitchell's water monitor have also been reported to be exported live to be sold in global markets.

=== Status ===
According to the IUCN Red List, Mitchell's water monitor is currently classified as critically endangered. Its population is decreasing. The decrease of Mitchell's water monitor following the introduction of cane toads to Australia has been estimated to be as high as 97% after only three years. At Kakadu National Park, almost the entire population of Mitchell's water monitor was taken out by the arrival of cane toads; however, a 2020 survey of the area found some individuals of the species. Despite this, the species has persisted at many habitat spots; however, as sightings are rare, there is no current estimate on the number of individuals in each population of Mitchell's water monitor.

=== Efforts ===
Researches are trying to find ways to make monitor lizards avoid cane toads. One current strategy is called Conditioned Taste Aversion Therapy, or CTA. It is a strategy where an animal associates a certain food with illness; said animal will avoid that food in the future because of the association. Researchers at the University of Sydney offered small cane toads with a non-lethal amount of poison to monitors in an area where the toads haven't reached yet, and found that the monitors who ate the small toads avoided them in the future. These small toads (or "teacher toads") only make the lizards sick, but it is enough to dissuade them from eating the toads again. Other reports of successful CTA include the use of non-living bait. In order for this prevention strategy to work, scientists would have to identify areas of concentrated biodiversity in order for the results to balance out the cost of the bait. As the invasive cane toad population expands throughout Australia, scientists believe that releasing smaller toads ahead of the larger ones will increase CTA in lizards and prevent them from eating the toads that contain a lethal amount of poison.

Other efforts are aimed at protecting the current populations of Mitchell's water monitor at sites already occupied by cane toads as it will be extremely difficult to stop the spread of these invasive toads.

The Northern Territory Government has set up the Island Arks program to help the conservation of species affected by the cane toads.
