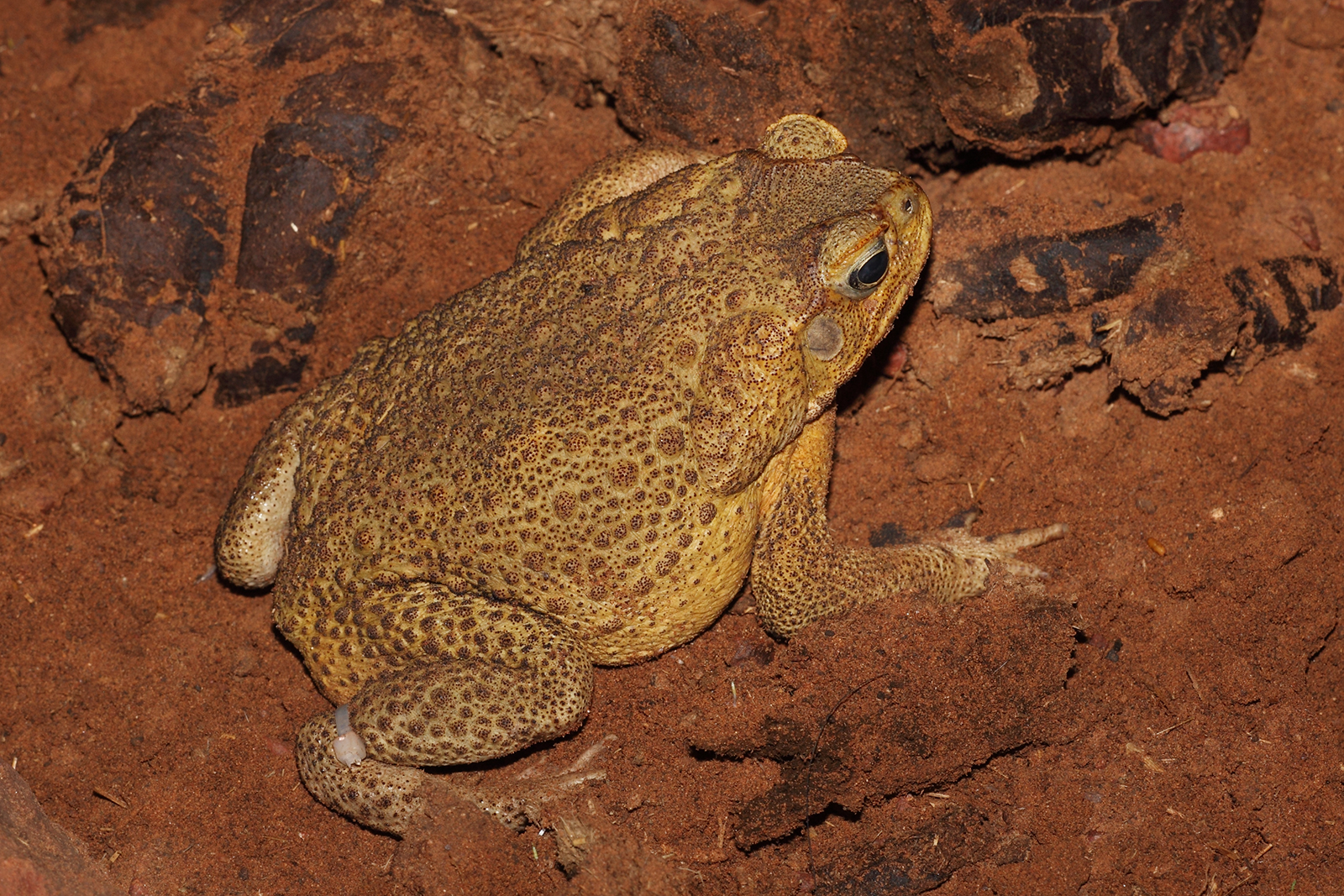
- Adult male
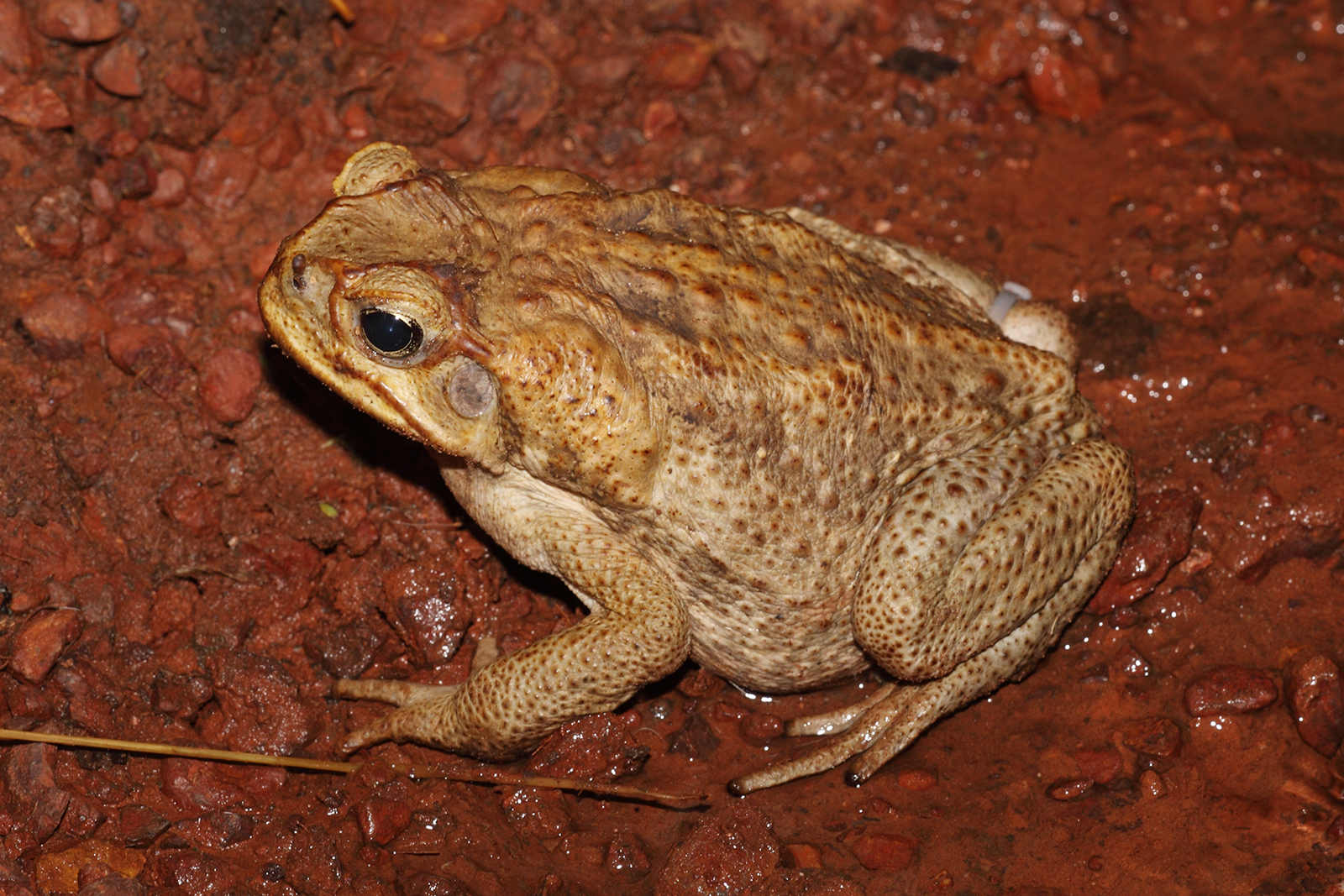
- Adult female

Conservation status
- Least Concern (IUCN 3.1)

Scientific classification
- Kingdom: Animalia
- Phylum: Chordata
- Class: Amphibia
- Order: Anura
- Family: Bufonidae
- Genus: Rhinella
- Species: R. marina

Binomial name
- Rhinella marina (Linnaeus, 1758)
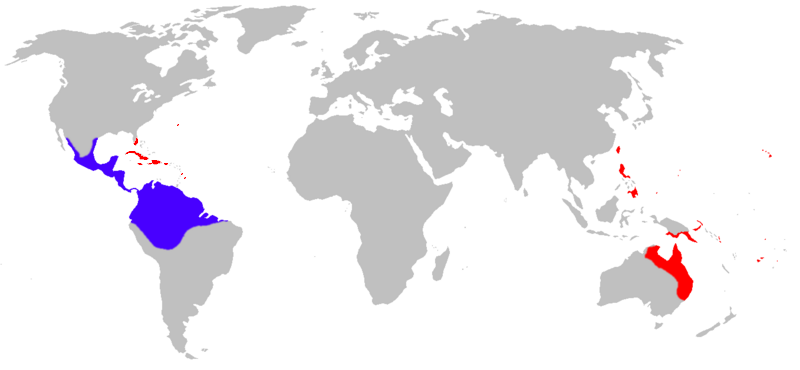
- Distribution of the cane toad, native distribution in blue, introduced in red

Synonyms
- Rana marina Linnaeus, 1758; Bufo marinus (Linnaeus, 1758); Rhinella marinus (subsequent erroneous spelling); Chaunus marinus (Linnaeus, 1758)

= Cane toad =

Cane toad Temporal range: 13.8–0 Ma

World's largest true toad

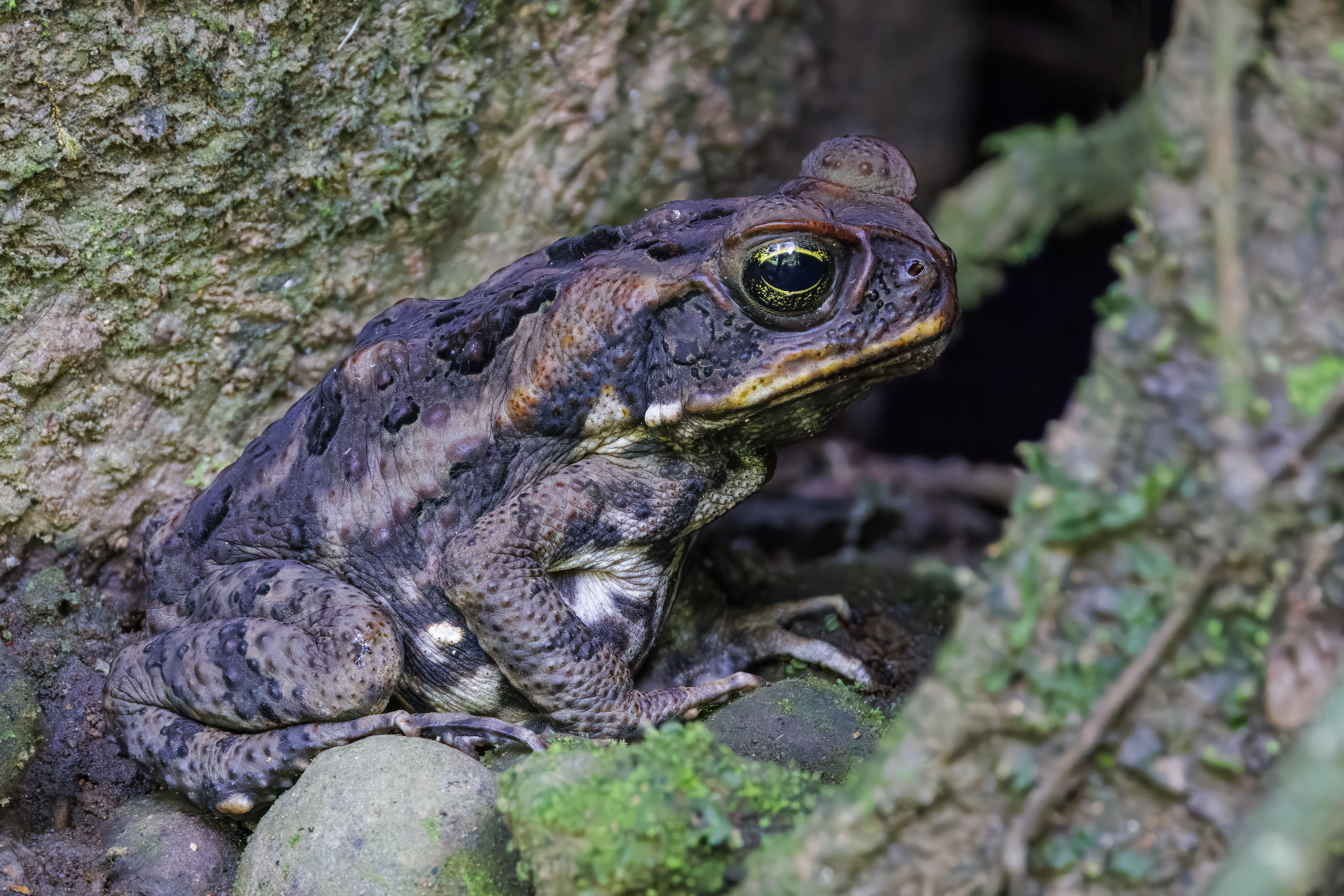
on Taveuni, Fiji

The cane toad (Rhinella marina), also known as the giant neotropical toad or marine toad, is a large, terrestrial true toad native to South and mainland Central America, but which has been introduced to various islands throughout Oceania and the Caribbean, as well as Northern Australia. It is included as a member of the genus Rhinella, which includes many true toad species found throughout Central and South America, but until 2007 it was assigned to the genus Bufo.

A fossil toad (specimen UCMP 41159) from the La Venta fauna of the late Miocene in Colombia is morphologically indistinguishable from modern cane toads from northern South America. It was discovered in a floodplain deposit, which suggests the R. marina habitat preferences have long been for open areas. The cane toad is a prolific breeder; females lay single-clump spawns with thousands of eggs. Its reproductive success is partly because of opportunistic feeding: it has a diet, unusual among anurans, of both dead and living matter. Adults average 10–15 cm (4–6 in) in length; the largest recorded specimen had a snout–vent length of 24 cm (9.4 in).

The cane toad has poison glands, and the tadpoles are highly toxic to most animals if ingested. Its toxic skin can kill many animals, both wild and domesticated, and cane toads are particularly dangerous to dogs. Because of its voracious appetite, the cane toad has been introduced to many regions of the Pacific and the Caribbean islands as a method of agricultural pest control. The common name of the species is derived from its use against the cane beetle (Dermolepida albohirtum), which damages sugar cane. The cane toad is now considered a pest and an invasive species in many of its introduced regions. The 1988 film Cane Toads: An Unnatural History documented the trials and tribulations of the introduction of cane toads in Australia.

== Taxonomy ==
The species was named Rana marina by Carl Linnaeus in the 10th edition of his Systema naturae (1758). Linnaeus based the name on an illustration by Dutch zoologist Albertus Seba, who mistakenly believed the cane toad to inhabit both terrestrial and marine environments. The species was placed in the genus Bufo by Johann Gottlob Schneider in 1799.

The genus Rhinella is considered to constitute a distinct genus of its own, thus changing the scientific name of the cane toad, as was done by implication by Juan Carlos Chaparro, Jennifer B. Pramuk and Andrew Gallagher Gluesenkamp in 2007. In this case, the specific name marinus (masculine) changes to marina (feminine) to conform with the rules of gender agreement as set out by the International Code of Zoological Nomenclature, changing the binomial name from Bufo marinus to Rhinella marina; the binomial Rhinella marinus was subsequently introduced as a synonym through misspelling by Pramuk, Robertson, Sites, and Noonan (2008). Though controversial (with many traditional herpetologists still using Bufo marinus) the binomial Rhinella marina is gaining in acceptance with such bodies as the IUCN, and Amphibian Species of the World and increasing numbers of scientific publications adopting its usage.

Historically, the cane toad was used to eradicate pests from sugarcane, giving rise to its common name. The cane toad has many other common names, including "giant toad" and "marine toad"; the former refers to its size, and the latter to the binomial name, R. marina. Other common names include "giant neotropical toad", "Dominican toad", "giant marine toad", and "South American cane toad". In Trinidadian English, they are commonly called crapaud, the French word for toad.

Since 2016, cane toad populations native to Mesoamerica and northwestern South America are sometimes considered to be a separate species, Rhinella horribilis.

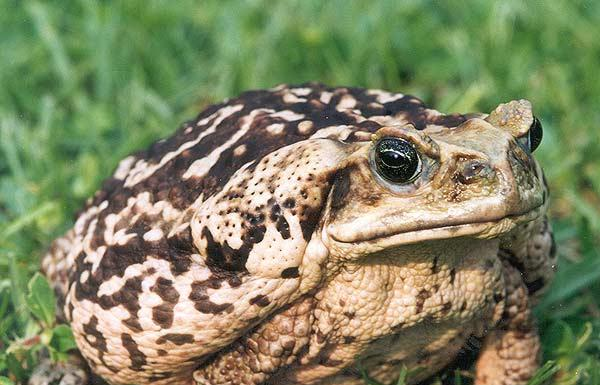
Light-coloured cane toad

In Australia, the adults may be confused with large native frogs from the genera Limnodynastes, Cyclorana, and Mixophyes. These species can be distinguished from the cane toad by the absence of large parotoid glands behind their eyes and the lack of a ridge between the nostril and the eye. Cane toads have been confused with the giant burrowing frog (Heleioporus australiacus), because both are large and warty in appearance; however, the latter can be readily distinguished from the former by its vertical pupils and its silver-grey (as opposed to gold) irises. Juvenile cane toads may be confused with species of the genus Uperoleia, but their adult colleagues can be distinguished by the lack of bright colouring on the groin and thighs.

In the United States, the cane toad closely resembles many bufonid species. In particular, it could be confused with the southern toad (Anaxyrus terrestris), which can be distinguished by the presence of two bulbs in front of the parotoid glands.

=== Taxonomy and evolution ===
The cane toad genome has been sequenced and certain Australian academics believe this will help in understanding how the toad can quickly evolve to adapt to new environments, the workings of its infamous toxin, and hopefully provide new options for halting this species' march across Australia and other places it has spread as an invasive pest.

Studies of the genome confirm its evolutionary origins in northern South America and its close genetic relation to Rhinella diptycha and other similar species of the genus. Recent studies suggest that R. marina diverged between 2.75 and 9.40 million years ago.

A recent split in the species into further subspecies may have occurred approximately 2.7 million years ago following the isolation of population groups by the rising Venezuelan Andes.

== Description ==
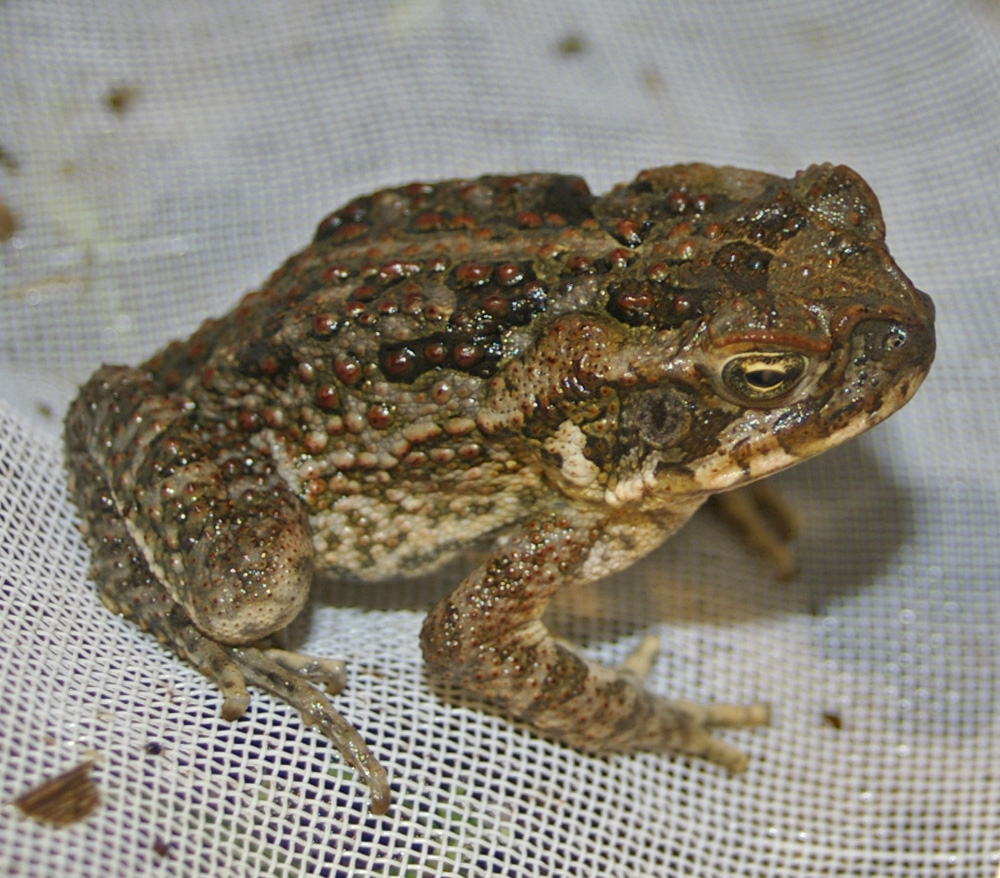
Young cane toad

Considered the largest species in the Bufonidae, the cane toad is very large; the females are significantly longer than males, reaching a typical length of 10–15 cm (4–6 in), with a maximum of 24 cm (9.4 in). Larger toads tend to be found in areas of lower population density. They have a life expectancy of 10 to 15 years in the wild, and can live considerably longer in captivity, with one specimen reportedly surviving for 35 years.

The skin of the cane toad is dry and warty. Distinct ridges above the eyes run down the snout. Individual cane toads can be grey, yellowish, red-brown, or olive-brown, with varying patterns. A large parotoid gland lies behind each eye. The ventral surface is cream-coloured and may have blotches in shades of black or brown. The pupils are horizontal and the irises golden. The toes have a fleshy webbing at their base, and the fingers are free of webbing.

Typically, juvenile cane toads have smooth, dark skin, although some specimens have a red wash. Juveniles lack the adults' large parotoid glands, so they are usually less poisonous. The tadpoles are small and uniformly black, and are bottom-dwellers, tending to form schools. Tadpoles range from 10 to 25 mm (0.4 to 1.0 in) in length.

== Ecology, behaviour and life history ==
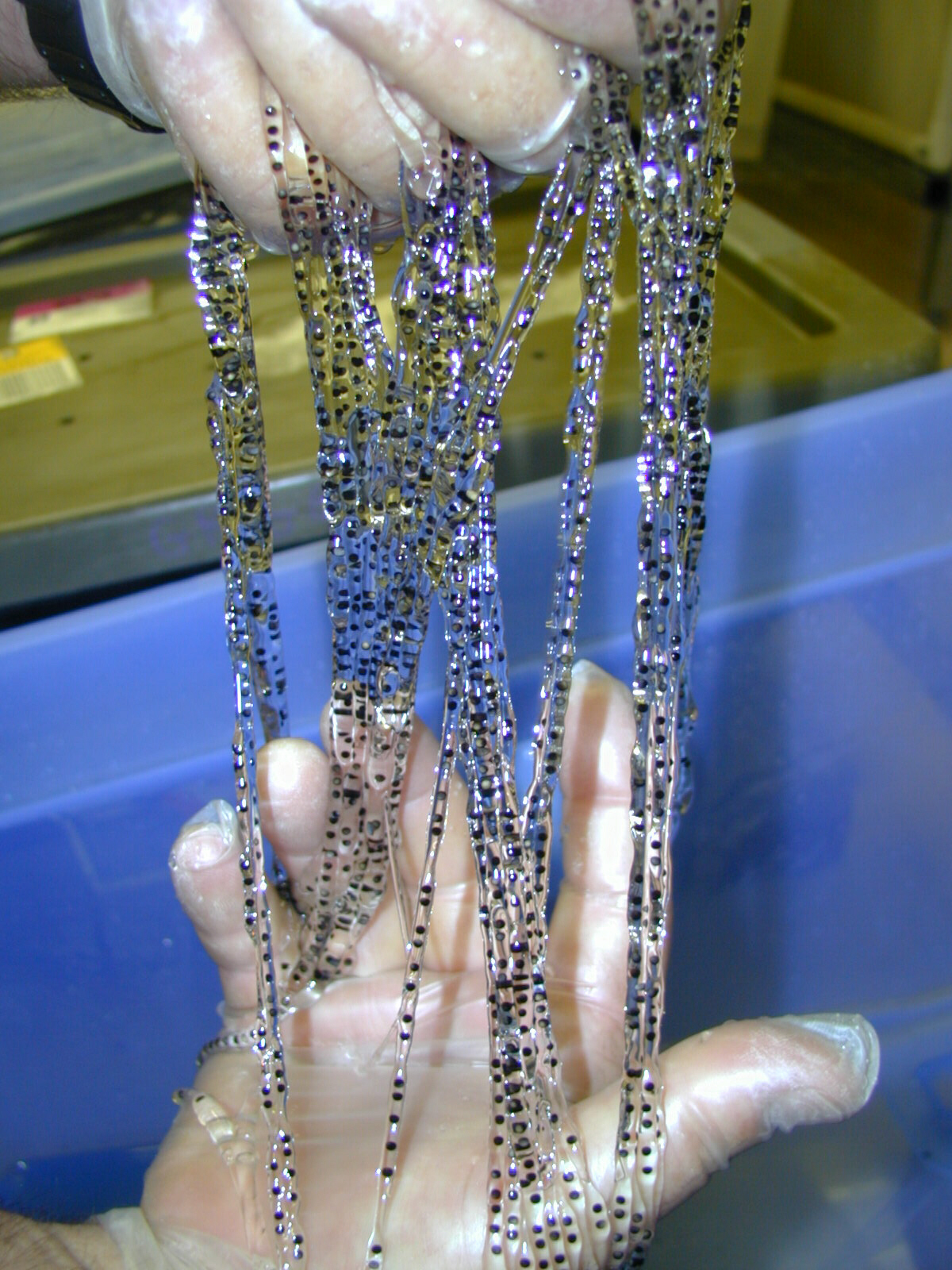
Cane toad spawn

The common name "marine toad" and the scientific name Rhinella marina suggest a link to marine life, but cane toads do not live in the sea. However, laboratory experiments suggest that tadpoles can tolerate salt concentrations equivalent to 15% of seawater (~5.4‰), and recent field observations found living tadpoles and toadlets at salinities of 27.5‰ on Coiba Island, Panama. The cane toad inhabits open grassland and woodland, and has displayed a "distinct preference" for areas modified by humans, such as gardens and drainage ditches. In their native habitats, the toads can be found in subtropical forests, although dense foliage tends to limit their dispersal.

The cane toad begins life as an egg, which is laid as part of long strings of jelly in water. A female lays 8,000–25,000 eggs at once and the strings can stretch up to 20 m (66 ft) in length. The black eggs are covered by a membrane and their diameter is about 1.7–2.0 mm (0.067–0.079 in). The rate at which an egg grows into a tadpole increases with temperature. Tadpoles typically hatch within 48 hours, but the period can vary from 14 hours to almost a week. This process usually involves thousands of tadpoles—which are small, black, and have short tails—forming into groups. Between 12 and 60 days are needed for the tadpoles to develop into juveniles, with four weeks being typical. Similarly to their adult counterparts, eggs and tadpoles are toxic to many animals.

When they emerge, toadlets typically are about 10–11 mm (0.39–0.43 in) in length, and grow rapidly. While the rate of growth varies by region, time of year, and sex, an average initial growth rate of 0.647 mm (0.0255 in) per day is seen, followed by an average rate of 0.373 mm (0.0147 in) per day. Growth typically slows once the toads reach sexual maturity. This rapid growth is important for their survival; in the period between metamorphosis and subadulthood, the young toads lose the toxicity that protected them as eggs and tadpoles, but have yet to fully develop the parotoid glands that produce bufotoxin. Only an estimated 0.5% of cane toads reach adulthood, in part because they lack this key defense—but also due to tadpole cannibalism. Although cannibalism does occur in the native population in South America, the rapid evolution occurring in the unnaturally large population in Australia has produced tadpoles 30x more likely to be interested in cannibalising their siblings, and 2.6x more likely to actually do so. They have also evolved to shorten their tadpole phase in response to the presence of older tadpoles. These changes are likely genetic, although no genetic basis has been determined.

As with rates of growth, the point at which the toads become sexually mature varies across different regions. In New Guinea, sexual maturity is reached by female toads with a snout–vent length between 70 and 80 mm (2.8 and 3.1 in), while toads in Panama achieve maturity when they are between 90 and 100 mm (3.5 and 3.9 in) in length. In tropical regions, such as their native habitats, breeding occurs throughout the year, but in subtropical areas, breeding occurs only during warmer periods that coincide with the onset of the wet season.

The cane toad is estimated to have a critical thermal maximum of 40–42 °C (104–108 °F) and a minimum of around 10–15 °C (50–59 °F). The ranges can change due to adaptation to the local environment. Cane toads from some populations can adjust their thermal tolerance within a few hours of encountering low temperatures. The toad is able to rapidly acclimate to the cold using physiological plasticity, though there is also evidence that more northerly populations of cane toads in the United States are better cold-adapted than more southerly populations. These adaptations have allowed the cane toad to establish invasive populations across the world. The toad's ability to rapidly acclimate to thermal changes suggests that current models may underestimate the potential range of habitats that the toad can populate. The cane toad has a high tolerance to water loss; some can withstand a 52.6% loss of body water, allowing them to survive outside tropical environments.

=== Diet ===
Most frogs identify prey by movement, and vision appears to be the primary method by which the cane toad detects prey; however, it can also locate food using its sense of smell. They eat a wide range of material; in addition to the normal prey of small rodents, other small mammals, reptiles, other amphibians, birds, and even bats (such as velvety free-tailed bats and other unidentified bats) and a range of invertebrates (such as ants, beetles, earwigs, dragonflies, grasshoppers, true bugs, crustaceans, and gastropods), they also eat plants, dog food, cat food, feces, and household refuse.

=== Defences ===
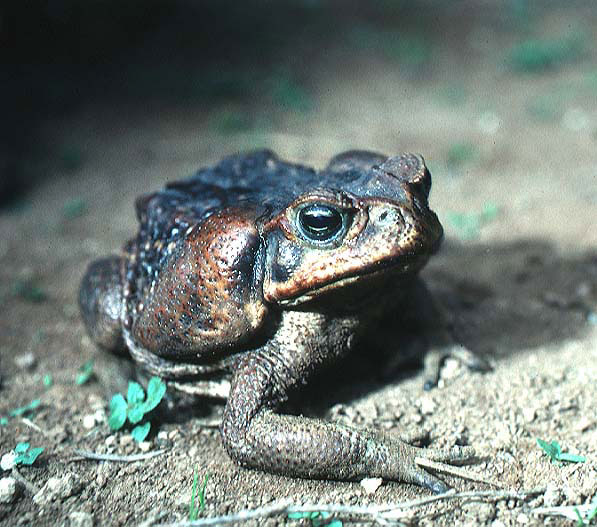
Specimen from El Salvador: The large parotoid glands are visible behind the eyes.

The skin of the adult cane toad is toxic, as well as the enlarged parotoid glands behind the eyes, and other glands across its back. When the toad is threatened, its glands secrete a milky-white fluid known as bufotoxin. Components of bufotoxin are toxic to many animals; even human deaths have been recorded due to the consumption of cane toads. Dogs are especially prone to be poisoned by licking or biting toads. Pets showing excessive drooling, extremely red gums, head-shaking, crying, loss of coordination, and/or convulsions require immediate veterinary attention.

Bufotenin, one of the chemicals excreted by the cane toad, is classified as a schedule 9 drug under Australian law, alongside heroin and LSD. The effects of bufotenin are thought to be similar to those of mild poisoning; the stimulation, which includes mild hallucinations, lasts less than an hour. As the cane toad excretes bufotenin in small amounts, and other toxins in relatively large quantities, toad licking could result in serious illness or death.

In addition to releasing toxin, the cane toad is capable of inflating its lungs, puffing up, and lifting its body off the ground to appear taller and larger to a potential predator.

Since 2011, experimenters in the Kimberley region of Western Australia have used poisonous sausages containing toad meat in an attempt to protect native animals from cane toads' deadly impact. The Western Australian Department of Environment and Conservation, along with the University of Sydney, developed these sausage-shaped baits as a tool in order to train native animals not to eat the toads. By blending bits of toad with a nausea-inducing chemical, the baits train the animals to stay away from the amphibians.

Young cane toads that aren't lethal upon ingestion have also been used to teach native predators avoidance, namely yellow-spotted monitors. 200,000 metamorphs, tadpoles, and eggs in total were released in areas ahead of inevitable invasion fronts. Following invasion by wild cane toads, yellow-spotted monitors in control areas bereft of the "teacher toads" were virtually wiped out, but experimental areas still contained substantial populations of yellow-spotted monitors.

=== Predators ===
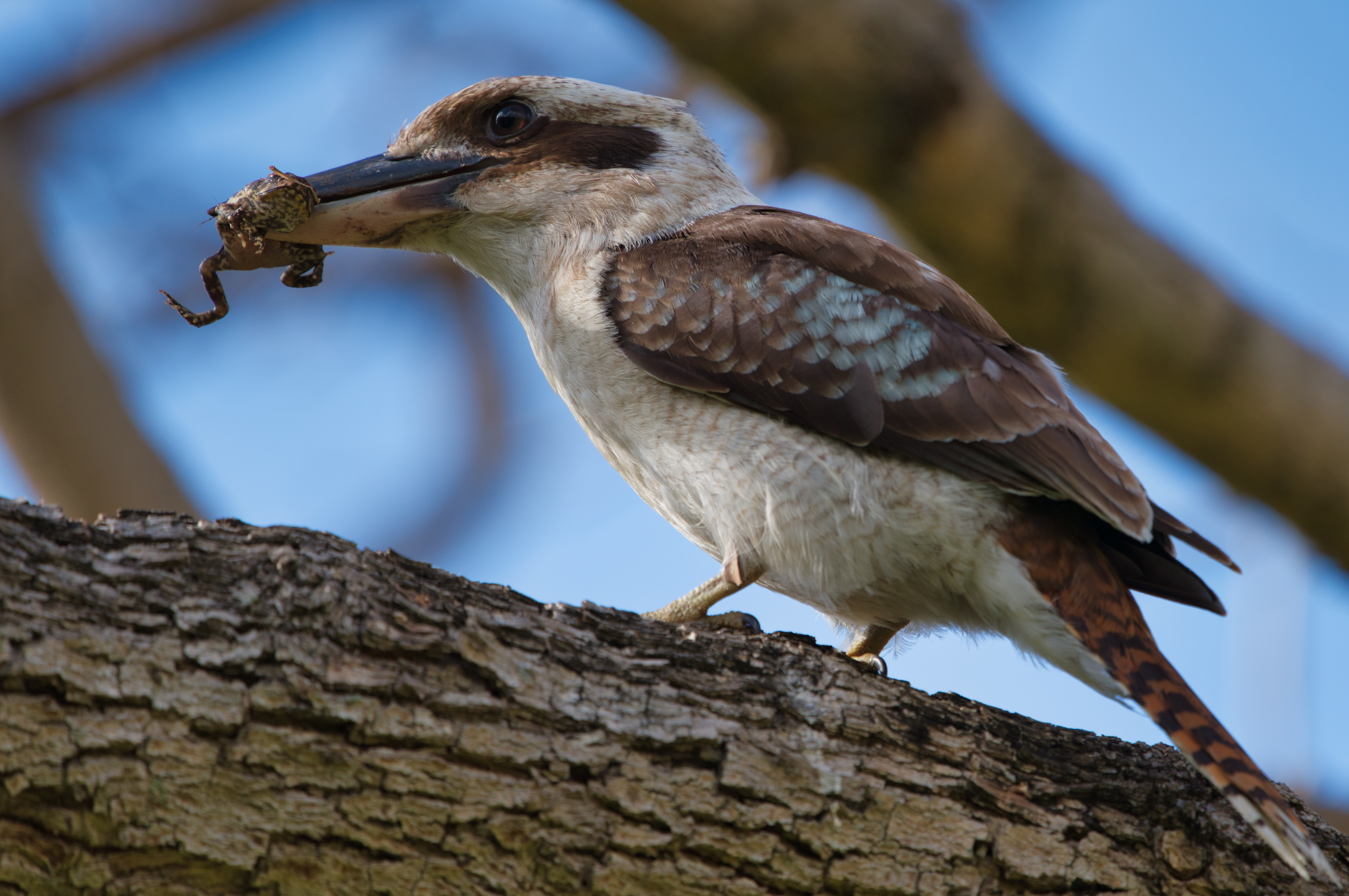
Laughing kookaburra (Dacelo novaeguineae) preying on a juvenile cane toad

Many species prey on the cane toad and its tadpoles in its native habitat, including the broad-snouted caiman (Caiman latirostris), the banded cat-eyed snake (Leptodeira annulata), eels (family Anguillidae), various species of killifish, and Paraponera clavata (bullet ants).

Predators outside the cane toad's native range include the rock flagtail (Kuhlia rupestris), some species of catfish (order Siluriformes), some species of ibis (subfamily Threskiornithinae), the whistling kite (Haliastur sphenurus), the rakali (Hydromys chrysogaster), the black rat (Rattus rattus) and the water monitor (Varanus salvator). The tawny frogmouth (Podargus strigoides) and the Papuan frogmouth (Podargus papuensis) have been reported as feeding on cane toads; some Australian crows (Corvus spp.) have also learned strategies allowing them to feed on cane toads, such as using their beak to flip toads onto their backs. Kookaburras also prey on the amphibians.

Opossums of the genus Didelphis likely can eat cane toads with impunity. Meat ants are unaffected by the cane toads' toxins, so are able to kill them without reaction. The cane toad's normal response to attack is to stand still and let its toxin kill or repel the attacker, which allows the ants to attack and eat the toad. Saw-shelled turtles have also been seen successfully and safely eating cane toads.

In Australia, rakali (Australian water rats) learnt in two years how to eat cane toads safely. They select the largest toads, turn them over, remove the poisonous gallbladder, and eat the heart and other organs with "surgical precision". They remove the toxic skin and eat the thigh muscle. Other animals such as crows and kites turn cane toads inside out and eat non-poisonous organs, also thus avoiding the skin.

== Distribution ==
The cane toad is native to the Americas, and its range stretches from the Rio Grande Valley in South Texas to the central Amazon and southeastern Peru, and some of the continental islands near Venezuela (such as Trinidad and Tobago). This area encompasses both tropical and semiarid environments. The density of the cane toad is significantly lower within its native distribution than in places where it has been introduced. In South America, the density was recorded to be 20 adults per 100 m (110 yd) of shoreline, 1 to 2% of the density in Australia.

=== As an introduced species ===
The cane toad has been introduced to many regions of the world—particularly the Pacific—for the biological control of agricultural pests. These introductions have generally been well documented, and the cane toad may be one of the most studied of any introduced species.

Before the early 1840s, the cane toad had been introduced into Martinique and Barbados, from French Guiana and Guyana. An introduction to Jamaica was made in 1844 in an attempt to reduce the rat population. Despite its failure to control the rodents, the cane toad was introduced to Puerto Rico in the early 20th century in the hope that it would counter a beetle infestation ravaging the sugarcane plantations. The Puerto Rican scheme was successful and halted the economic damage caused by the beetles, prompting scientists in the 1930s to promote it as an ideal solution to agricultural pests.

As a result, many countries in the Pacific region emulated the lead of Puerto Rico and introduced the toad in the 1930s. Introduced populations are in Australia; Florida; Papua New Guinea; the Philippines; Ishigaki Island, the Ogasawara, and the Daitō Islands of Japan; Taiwan's Caotun; most Caribbean islands; and Fiji and many other Pacific islands, including Hawaiʻi. Since then, the cane toad has become a pest in many host countries, and poses a serious threat to native animals.

=== Australia ===
Following the apparent success of the cane toad in eating the beetles threatening the sugarcane plantations of Puerto Rico, and the fruitful introductions into Hawaiʻi and the Philippines, a strong push was made for the cane toad to be released in Australia to negate the pests ravaging the Queensland cane fields. As a result, 102 toads were collected from Hawaiʻi and brought to Australia. Queensland's sugar scientists released the toad into cane fields in August 1935. After this initial release, the Commonwealth Department of Health decided to ban future introductions until a study was conducted into the feeding habits of the toad. The study was completed in 1936 and the ban lifted, and large-scale releases were undertaken; by March 1937, 62,000 toadlets had been released into the wild. The toads became firmly established in Queensland, increasing exponentially in number and extending their range into the Northern Territory and New South Wales. In 2010, one was found on the far western coast in Broome, Western Australia.

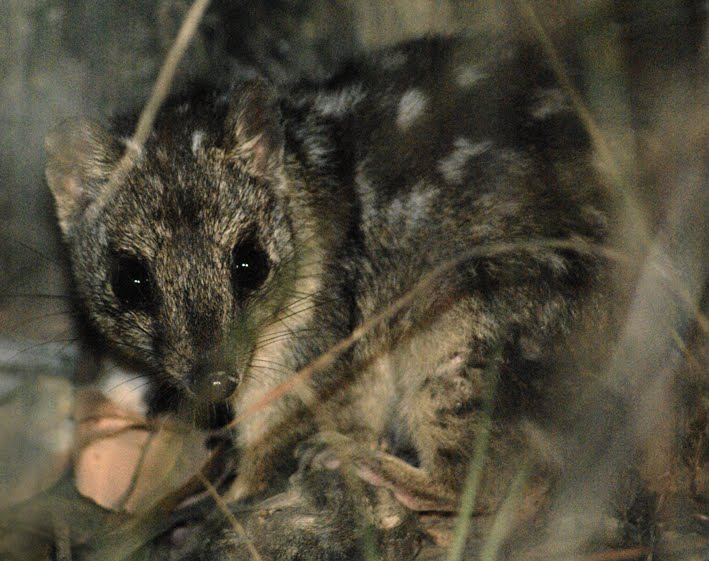
The cane toad has been linked to the to decreases in northern quolls in some parts of Australia

However, the toad was generally unsuccessful in reducing the targeted grey-backed cane beetles (Dermolepida albohirtum), in part because the cane fields provided insufficient shelter for the predators during the day, and in part because the beetles live at the tops of sugar cane—and cane toads are not good climbers. Since its original introduction, the cane toad has had a particularly marked effect on Australian biodiversity. The population of a number of native predatory reptiles has declined, such as the varanid lizards Varanus mertensi, V. mitchelli, and V. panoptes; the land snakes Pseudechis australis and Acanthophis antarcticus; and the freshwater crocodile species Crocodylus johnstoni. In contrast, the population of the agamid lizard Lophognathus gilberti—known to be a prey item of V. panoptes—has increased. Meat ants, however, are able to kill cane toads. The cane toad has also been linked to decreases in northern quolls in the southern region of Kakadu National Park and even their local extinction.

=== Caribbean ===
The cane toad was introduced to various Caribbean islands to counter a number of pests infesting local crops. While it was able to establish itself on some islands, such as Barbados, Jamaica, Hispaniola, and Puerto Rico, other introductions, such as in Cuba before 1900 and in 1946, and on the islands of Dominica and Grand Cayman, were unsuccessful.

The earliest recorded introductions were to Barbados and Martinique. The Barbados introductions were focused on the biological control of pests damaging the sugarcane crops, and while the toads became abundant, they have done even less to control the pests than in Australia. The toad was introduced to Martinique from French Guiana before 1944 and became established. Today, they reduce the mosquito and mole cricket populations. A third introduction to the region occurred in 1884, when toads appeared in Jamaica, reportedly imported from Barbados to help control the rodent population. While they had no significant effect on the rats, they nevertheless became well established. Other introductions include the release on Antigua—possibly before 1916, although this initial population may have died out by 1934 and been reintroduced at a later date—and Montserrat, which had an introduction before 1879 that led to the establishment of a solid population, which was apparently sufficient to survive the Soufrière Hills volcano eruption in 1995.

In 1920, the cane toad was introduced into Puerto Rico to control the populations of white grub (Phyllophaga spp.), a sugarcane pest. Before this, the pests were manually collected by humans, so the introduction of the toad eliminated labor costs. A second group of toads was imported in 1923, and by 1932, the cane toad was well established. The population of white grubs dramatically decreased, and this was attributed to the cane toad at the annual meeting of the International Sugar Cane Technologists in Puerto Rico. However, there may have been other factors. The six-year period after 1931—when the cane toad was most prolific, and the white grub had a dramatic decline—had the highest-ever rainfall for Puerto Rico. Nevertheless, the cane toad was assumed to have controlled the white grub; this view was reinforced by a Nature article titled "Toads save sugar crop", and this led to large-scale introductions throughout many parts of the Pacific.

The cane toad has been spotted in Carriacou and Dominica, the latter appearance occurring in spite of the failure of the earlier introductions. On September 8, 2013, the cane toad was also discovered on the island of New Providence in the Bahamas.

=== The Philippines ===
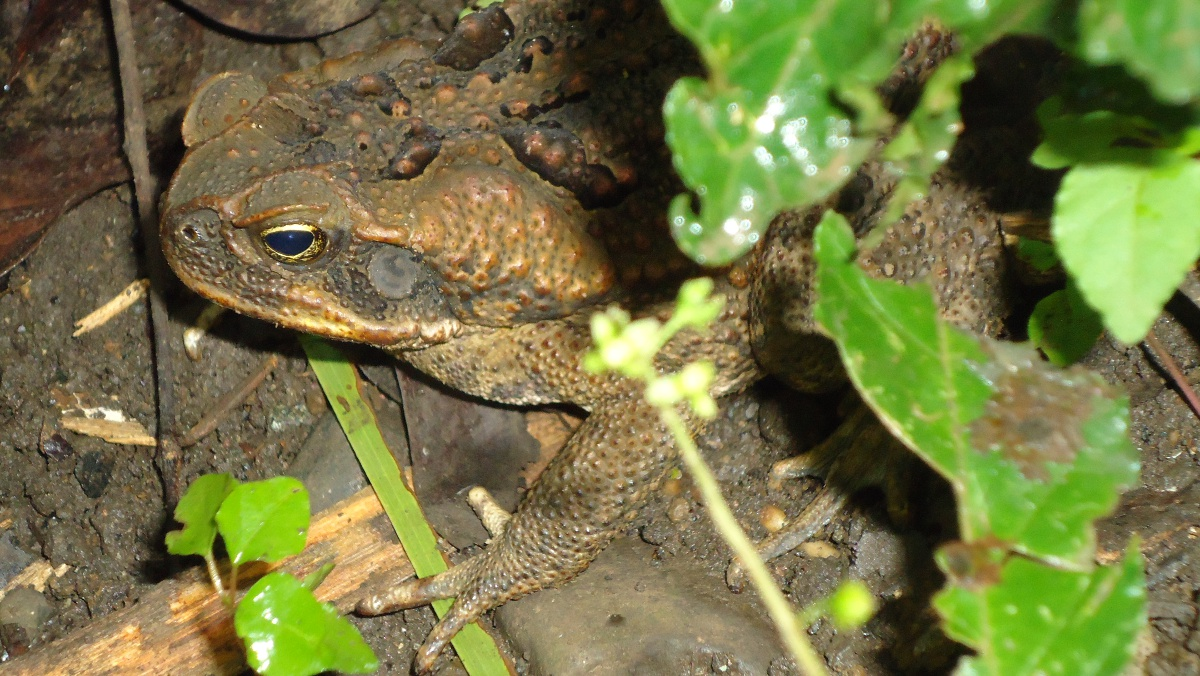
R. marina in the Philippines are referred to as kamprag, a corruption of 'American frog'.

The cane toad was first introduced deliberately into the Philippines in 1930 as a biological control agent of pests in sugarcane plantations, after the success of the experimental introductions into Puerto Rico. It subsequently became the most ubiquitous amphibian in the islands. It still retains the common name of bakî or kamprag in the Visayan languages, a corruption of 'American frog', referring to its origins. It is also commonly known as "bullfrog" in Philippine English.

=== Fiji ===
The cane toad was introduced into Fiji to combat insects that infested sugarcane plantations. The introduction of the cane toad to the region was first suggested in 1933, following the successes in Puerto Rico and Hawaiʻi. After considering the possible side effects, the national government of Fiji decided to release the toad in 1953, and 67 specimens were subsequently imported from Hawaiʻi. Once the toads were established, a 1963 study concluded, as the toad's diet included both harmful and beneficial invertebrates, it was considered "economically neutral". Today, the cane toad can be found on all major islands in Fiji, although they tend to be smaller than their counterparts in other regions.

=== New Guinea ===
The cane toad was introduced into New Guinea to control the hawk moth larvae eating sweet potato crops. The first release occurred in 1937 using toads imported from Hawaiʻi, with a second release the same year using specimens from the Australian mainland. Evidence suggests a third release in 1938, consisting of toads being used for human pregnancy tests—many species of toad were found to be effective for this task, and were employed for about 20 years after the discovery was announced in 1948. Initial reports argued the toads were effective in reducing the levels of cutworms and sweet potato yields were thought to be improving. As a result, these first releases were followed by further distributions across much of the region, although their effectiveness on other crops, such as cabbages, has been questioned; when the toads were released at Wau, the cabbages provided insufficient shelter and the toads rapidly left the immediate area for the superior shelter offered by the forest. A similar situation had previously arisen in the Australian cane fields, but this experience was either unknown or ignored in New Guinea. The cane toad has since become abundant in rural and urban areas.

=== United States ===
The cane toad naturally exists in South Texas, but attempts (both deliberate and accidental) have been made to introduce the species to other parts of the country. These include introductions to Florida and to Hawaiʻi, as well as largely unsuccessful introductions to Louisiana.

Initial releases into Florida failed. Attempted introductions before 1936 and 1944, intended to control sugarcane pests, were unsuccessful as the toads failed to proliferate. Later attempts failed in the same way. However, the toad gained a foothold in the state after an accidental release by an importer at Miami International Airport in 1957, and deliberate releases by animal dealers in 1963 and 1964 established the toad in other parts of Florida. Today, the cane toad is well established in the state, from the Keys to north of Tampa, and they are gradually extending further northward. In Florida, the toad is regarded as a threat to native species and pets. The Florida Fish and Wildlife Conservation Commission recommends residents to kill them.

Around 150 cane toads were introduced to Oʻahu in Hawaiʻi in 1932, and the population swelled to 105,517 after 17 months. The toads were sent to the other islands, and more than 100,000 toads were distributed by July 1934; eventually over 600,000 were transported.

== Uses ==
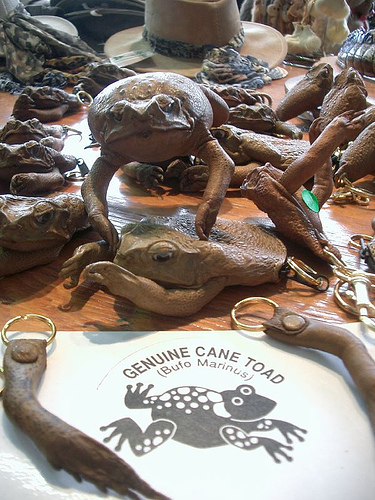
Cane toad merchandise

Other than the use as a biological control for pests, the cane toad has been employed in a number of commercial and noncommercial applications. Traditionally, within the toad's natural range in South America, the Embera-Wounaan would "milk" the toads for their toxin, which was then employed as an arrow poison. The toxins may have been used as an entheogen by the Olmec people. The toad has been hunted as a food source in parts of Peru, and eaten after the careful removal of the skin and parotoid glands. When properly prepared, the meat of the toad is considered healthy and as a source of omega-3 fatty acids. More recently, the toad's toxins have been used in a number of new ways: bufotenin has been used in Japan as an aphrodisiac and a hair restorer, and in cardiac surgery in China to lower the heart rates of patients. New research has suggested that the cane toad's poison may have some applications in treating prostate cancer.

Other modern applications of the cane toad include pregnancy testing, as pets, laboratory research, and the production of leather goods. Pregnancy testing was conducted in the mid-20th century by injecting urine from a woman into a male toad's lymph sacs, and if spermatozoa appeared in the toad's urine, the patient was deemed to be pregnant. The tests using toads were faster than those employing mammals; the toads were easier to raise, and, although the initial 1948 discovery employed Bufo arenarum for the tests, it soon became clear that a variety of anuran species were suitable, including the cane toad. As a result, toads were employed in this task for around 20 years. As a laboratory animal, the cane toad has numerous advantages: they are plentiful, and easy and inexpensive to maintain and handle. The use of the cane toad in experiments started in the 1950s, and by the end of the 1960s, large numbers were being collected and exported to high schools and universities. Since then, a number of Australian states have introduced or tightened importation regulations.

There are several commercial uses for dead cane toads. Cane toad skin is made into leather and novelty items. Stuffed cane toads, posed and accessorised, are merchandised at souvenir shops for tourists. Attempts have been made to produce fertiliser from toad carcasses.
