= Southern tree frog =

Southern tree frog may refer to:

- Southern brown tree frog, a frog native to Australia
- Southern foam-nest tree frog, a frog found in Africa
- Southern gray tree frog, a frog found in the United States
- Southern highland tree frog, a frog endemic to Mexico
- Southern laughing tree frog, a frog native to Australia
- Southern leaf green tree frog, a frog native to Australia
- Southern New Guinea tree frog, a frog endemic to Papua New Guinea
