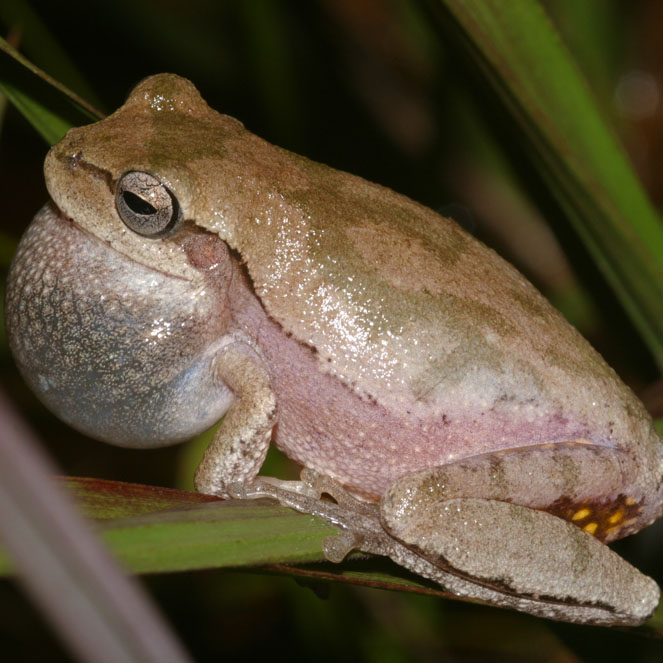

Conservation status
- Least Concern (IUCN 3.1)

Scientific classification
- Kingdom: Animalia
- Phylum: Chordata
- Class: Amphibia
- Order: Anura
- Family: Hylidae
- Genus: Dryophytes
- Species: D. femoralis

Binomial name
- Dryophytes femoralis (Daudin, 1800)

Synonyms
- Hyla femoralis Bosc, 1800

= Pine woods tree frog =

Species of amphibian

The pine woods tree frog (Dryophytes femoralis) is a species of frog in the family Hylidae, endemic to the southeastern United States.

== Description ==
=== Tadpole ===
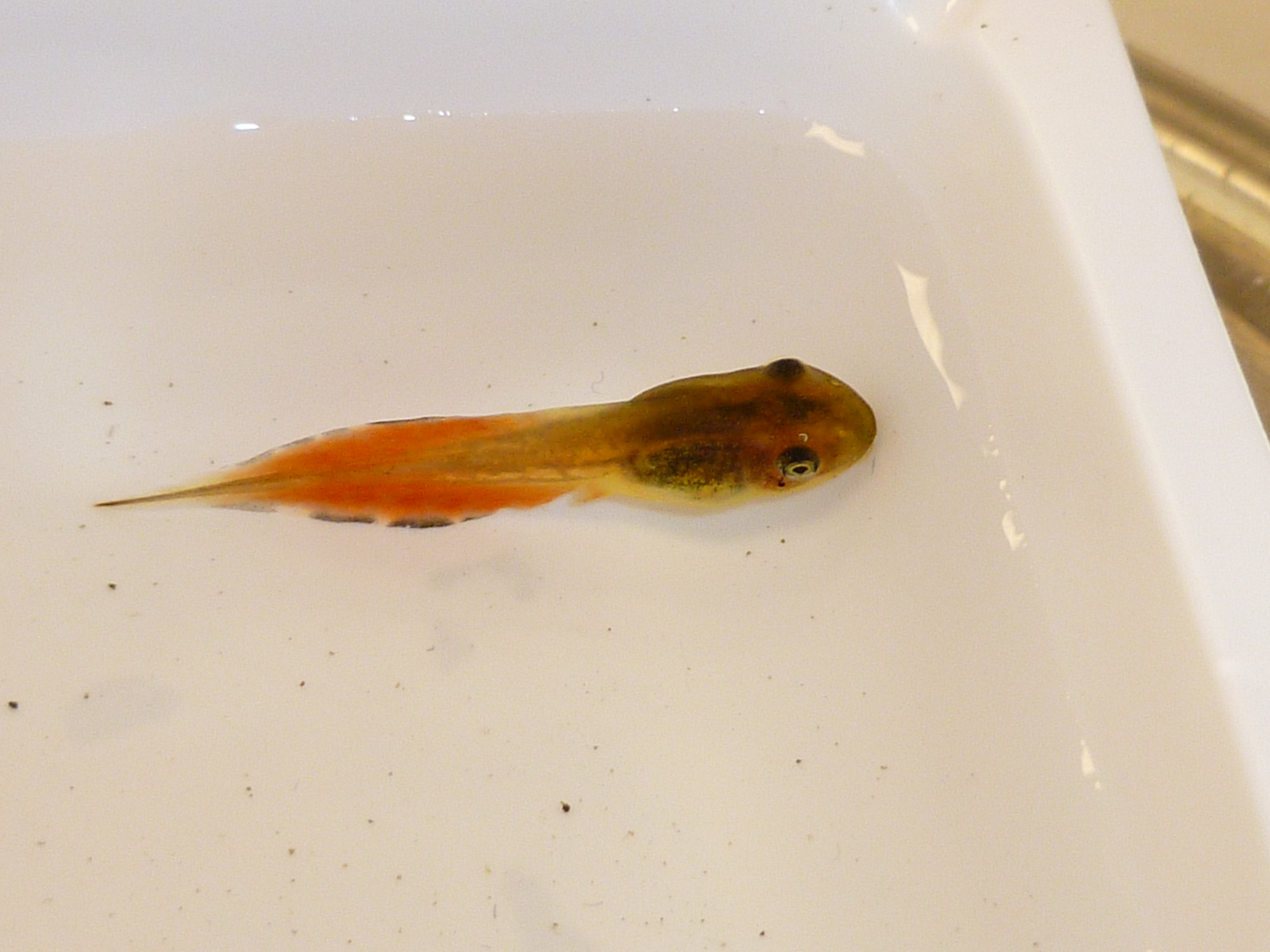
Pinewoods tree frog tadpole with red tail induced by the presence of predators (dragonfly larvae).

Pine woods tree frogs lay eggs in ephemeral water bodies. Eggs generally hatch within 24 hours, and tadpoles metamorphose into baby froglets after 50–75 days at 11–15 mm in length. Tadpoles are remarkably variable; similar to the squirrel tree frog (Dryophytes squirellus), the presence or absence of dragonfly larvae (a predator) induces a dramatic, red-colored tail. Research has shown that chemical cues released by predators and injured tadpoles are enough to trigger these color and body-shape changes, even if there is no direct contact with a predator.

Like many amphibian species' tadpoles, those of the pinewoods tree frog are susceptible to parasitic infection by trematode flatworms. However, tadpoles swim in a manner that does not necessarily reduce the intensity of infection, but reduces the likelihood of these parasites infecting in the head and body region; instead, their swimming behavior shunts parasites to the tail area, where infection by parasites causes fewer harmful effects.

=== Adult ===
The pine woods tree frog is a very small species, growing to a length of 25 to 38 mm (0.98 to 1.50 in). The color varies, sometimes being mottled brownish-gray, deep reddish-brown, gray, or grayish-green, usually with dark markings on its back. Sexual dimorphism is present where females are typically slightly larger than males. The body is slender, the legs are long, with the heel extending to the level of the eye. It is very similar in appearance to the squirrel tree frog but it can be distinguished from that species by the series of yellow, orange, or white dots that can be seen on the back of the thigh when the hind leg is extended. The toes have large toe pads but little webbing. Their distinctive call can be heard between April and October; it is a series of staccato sounds, giving it the nickname of "Morse code frog". D. femoralis is unique in that the advertisement signals of individuals are highly plastic.

== Distribution and habitat ==
The pine woods tree frog is found in the southeastern United States on the plains of the Atlantic and Gulf Coasts, its range extending from Virginia to Louisiana as well as south through peninsular Florida to Naples and Fort Lauderdale (but not in the Everglades). Disjunct inland populations occur in central Alabama and east-central Mississippi. It climbs high in trees, but also sometimes descends to ground level and favors pine woods, savannahs, mixed pine and turkey oak woodlands, and cypress swamps. During droughts or cold weather, it hides in or under rotten logs or in moist crevices in trees.

== Biology ==
The pine woods tree frog mainly eats insects. Breeding takes place at any time between March and October. The male calls, especially at dusk, from locations close to water, such as trees, bushes, and inside clumps of vegetation. The female lays 800 to 2,000 eggs in clusters of 100 eggs no more than 2–3 centimetres (0.79–1.18 in) below the water, which may be a ditch or temporary pool. The tadpoles are fully developed and ready to undergo metamorphosis at about two months old. There is evidence that suggests they can produce a second clutch in the same reproductive season allowing for two sets of eggs. Pine woods treefrog tadpoles may exhibit predator-induced phenotypic plasticity. Tadpoles exposed to predators develop deeper and shorter bodies and tails, smaller overall body size, and increased orange fin coloration and black tail outline. However, low food resources may inhibit the development of this induced morphology as it is energetically costly. The development of these predator-induced defenses slows tadpole growth and development, suggesting that anti-predator adaptations carry energetic costs even when food resources are abundant. Is able to hybridize with other Dryophytes genus frogs, such as D. chrysoscelis.

== Behavior ==
The species has a distinct call, characterized by long trains of pulses repeating at a highly irregular rate of 6 to 12 pulses per second. This call has been described as having a "rivet-hammer" quality and consists of a long series of closely spaced harmonics which separates the call from other treefrog species.

== Status ==
The pine woods tree frog is listed as being of "Least Concern" in the IUCN Red List of Threatened Species. Its large population is believed to be stable, and it is common over much of its wide range. Although this species is listed as least concern, respecting and protecting its habitat is still a priority. This idea is relevant because research suggests that Dryophytes femoralis is more sensitive to environmental and habitat change than other species of tree frogs. Therefore, environmental changes significantly affect the ability of this species to remain successful.
