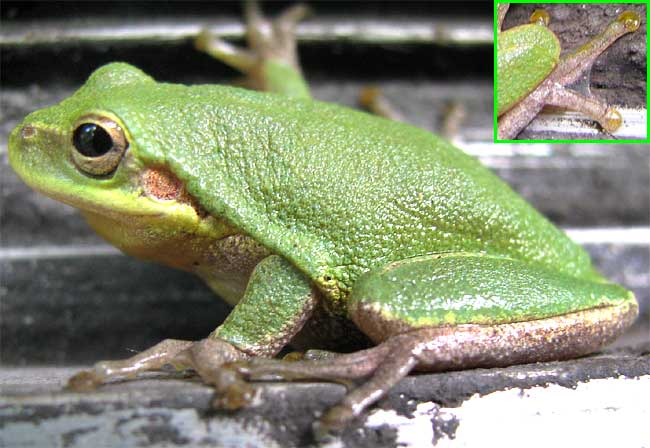

Conservation status
- Least Concern (IUCN 3.1)

Scientific classification
- Kingdom: Animalia
- Phylum: Chordata
- Class: Amphibia
- Order: Anura
- Family: Hylidae
- Genus: Dryophytes
- Species: D. squirellus

Binomial name
- Dryophytes squirellus (Daudin, 1800)

Synonyms
- Calamita squirella Merrem, 1820; Hyla delitescens LeConte, 1825; Auletris squirella Wagler, 1830; Dendrohyas squirella Tschudi, 1838; Hyla squirella Bosc, 1800

= Squirrel tree frog =

Species of amphibian

The squirrel tree frog (Dryophytes squirellus) is a small species of tree frog found in the southeastern United States, from Texas to Virginia. It is an introduced species to the Bahamas. Squirrel tree frogs are small frogs, about 1.5 inches in length as adults. There are several color variations, but most commonly they are green and look very much like the American green tree frog. They can also be varying shades of yellow or brown, sometimes with white or brown blotching. Males may also possess a relatively large, conspicuous lateral body stripe, with thicker stripes being more attractive to female frogs.

== Predation ==
As a tadpole, the squirrel tree frog is preyed upon by dragonfly nymphs, giant water bugs, predatory fish and newts. Once the tadpoles metamorphose, the predators of the frogs change to small mammals, other frogs, snakes, and birds.

To reduce the danger of being eaten as tadpoles, they use dense vegetation as cover. However, they do not appear to reduce activity within this cover. It has been suggested that the drying of the ponds is a more significant threat to the frogs than predation. As adults, they use their diminutive size and color-changing ability to avoid predation. Males may also conceal their lateral stripe with their fore- and hindlimbs when in daytime retreats or in water conservation posture to reduce detection. When not feeding, the frog reduces activity and hides in a retreat; frogs feed within 28 meters of this retreat site.

== Diet ==
The tadpoles are suspension feeders that scrape organic and inorganic matter from rocks, plants and log substrates. Adult squirrel tree frogs are very aggressive predators on insects and other invertebrates. They have been observed visiting porch lights in the evening to catch the bugs drawn in by the lights and circling piles of fresh cow-dung to devour the midges that were attracted to the cow-dung. They have also been observed to see prey in ambient light (6 × 10^{−5} to 1 × 10^{−3} lx), when normally they are active during the night (10^{−6} to 10^{−1} lx). An examination of tree frog stomachs found that nine were empty; four contained beetles; two contained only plant debris; and the rest contained a mixture of crayfish, spiders, crickets, and ants. Tree frogs' eating habits are affected by geographic location, weather, and developmental stage. Additionally, the recent feeding history of male frogs may influence the pigmentation of males' yellow lateral body stripes, but the exact mechanism controlling stripe size or saturation is still unknown.

== Distribution and reproduction ==
Squirrel tree frogs are found in the southeastern United States, from Virginia to Eastern Texas to the Florida Keys. The species is prominent throughout the Coastal Plain regions of South Carolina and Georgia. They have recently been introduced to the Bahamas, on Grand Bahama Island and Little Bahama Bank. They very rarely are found as far north as Mississippi. They occupy a wide range of habitats including fields; urbanized areas; swamps; pine and oak groves; opened wooded areas; the sides of buildings and almost anywhere that food, moisture and shelter can be found. They return to wetlands to breed, typically in locations such as ephemeral pools, roadside ditches or canopy pools where they are safe from predatory fish. Breeding is tied strongly to rain events. The females are oviparous, and the eggs are laid singly or in pairs, typically less than or equal to one thousand in number. Males have a special breeding call that can be heard from March to August, even extending into autumn in some parts of the country. Females have been found to prefer medium or low-frequency calls, as well as for faster, more energetically costly call rates. Visual information, such as a large stripe, have also been found to play a role in mate selection by these nocturnal frogs. They breed in large groups during the summer months.

== Conservation ==
Squirrel tree frogs are active foragers, even when insect predators are present. They can be found in both open- and heavily-forested wetlands, but they have higher rates of survival in bodies of water with a higher density vegetation. Due to their high levels of activity, squirrel tree frogs tadpoles are vulnerable to predation by multiple species of fish, and the adults are vulnerable to predation by the non-native Cuban tree frog. Additionally, in areas where predation rates are relatively high, females may utilize visual cues to quickly localize males, but the costs of visual signaling as compared to acoustic signaling need to be explored further.

Because of their rapid growth and development, the tadpoles are more likely to survive insect predators than fish predators. There are multiple species of fish, including Gambusia holbrooki, that are capable of hunting and consuming squirrel tree frog tadpoles within higher density vegetation. They are a highly active species that forages throughout the water column, and as a result the tadpoles are vulnerable to many species of fish.

The Cuban tree frog is known to eat smaller native frogs including the squirrel tree frog. As the population of the Cuban tree frog has increased in Florida, the native squirrel tree frog population has decreased. When they are reared alongside Cuban tree frogs, squirrel tree frogs have a lower survival rate than when they are reared alone; however, the Cuban tree frog does not appear to be a threat to the squirrel tree frog tadpoles.

Although the squirrel tree frog population has decreased in some urbanized areas, they are abundant in some areas of Augusta, Georgia, and Tampa, Florida. The squirrel tree frog crosses roads at night after rains, but the overall effect of traffic on the population is unknown. The squirrel tree frog has a large population and an ability to adapt to disturbed habitats; as a result, there are few concerns about its conservation status. Compared to Dryophytes femoralis and Dryophytes gratiosus, Dryophytes cinereus is less sensitive to environmental change. Although there are few concerns about its conservation status, the squirrel tree frog reproductive cycle could be impacted by climate change. Climate change is leading to long periods of hydrological drought and declining the number of ephemeral wetlands that these frogs rely on for breeding.

== Gallery ==
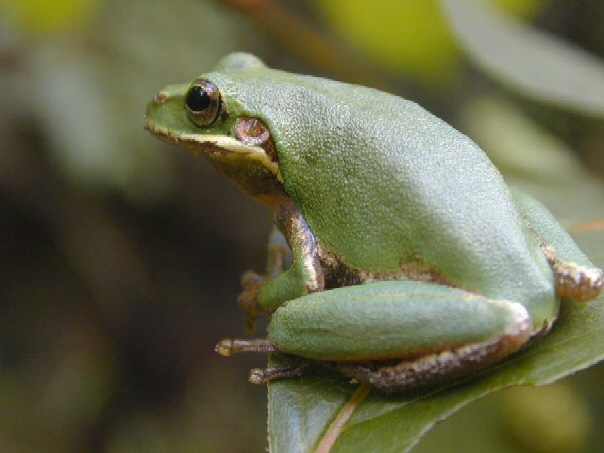
USGS photograph

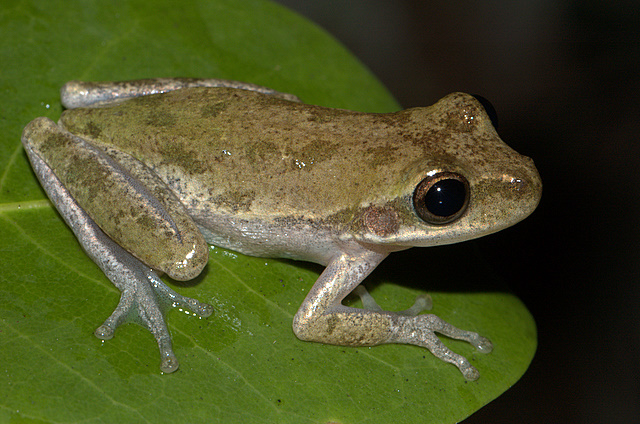
A juvenile

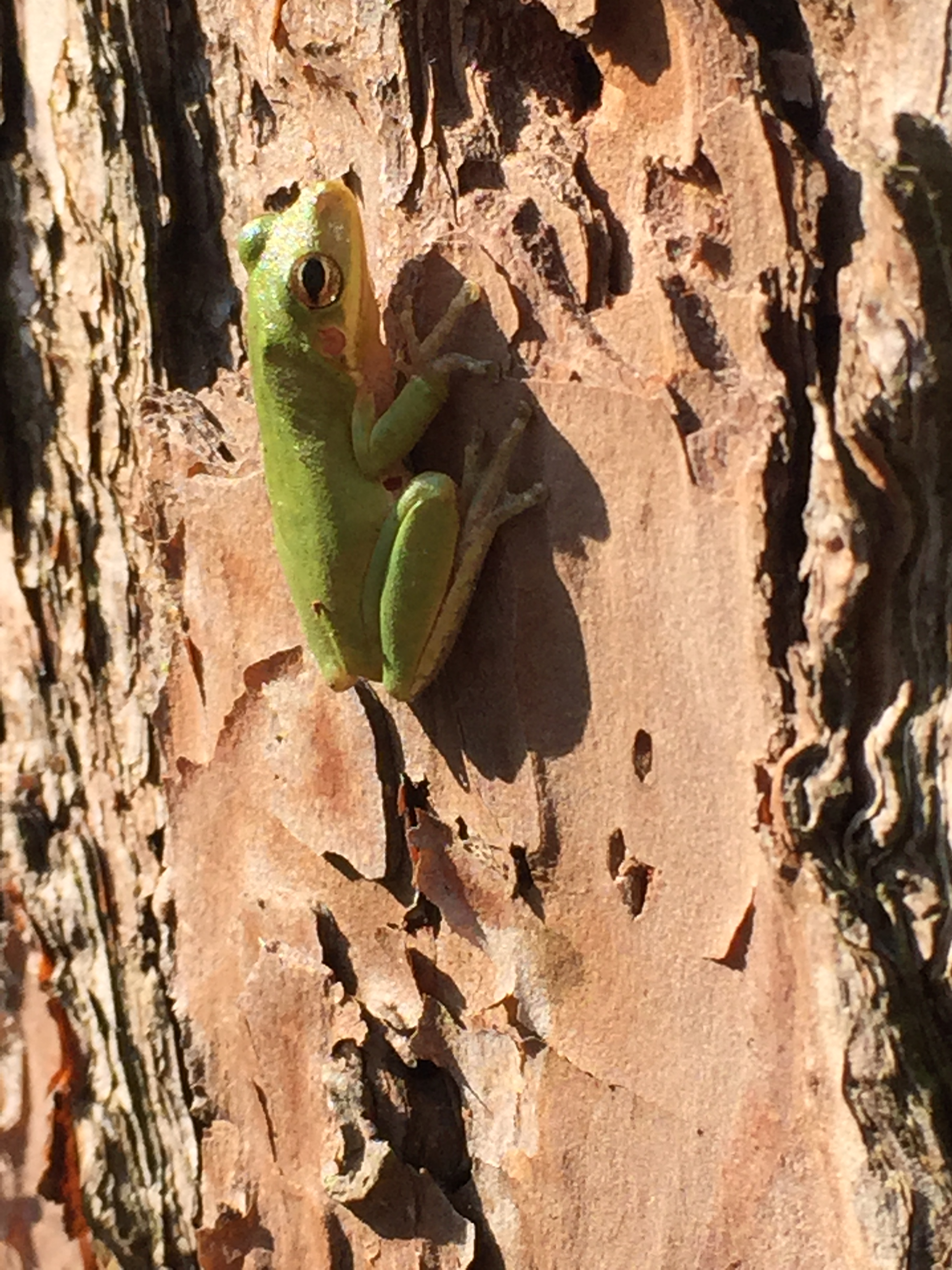
Squirrel tree frog on tree in Osceola National Forest, Florida

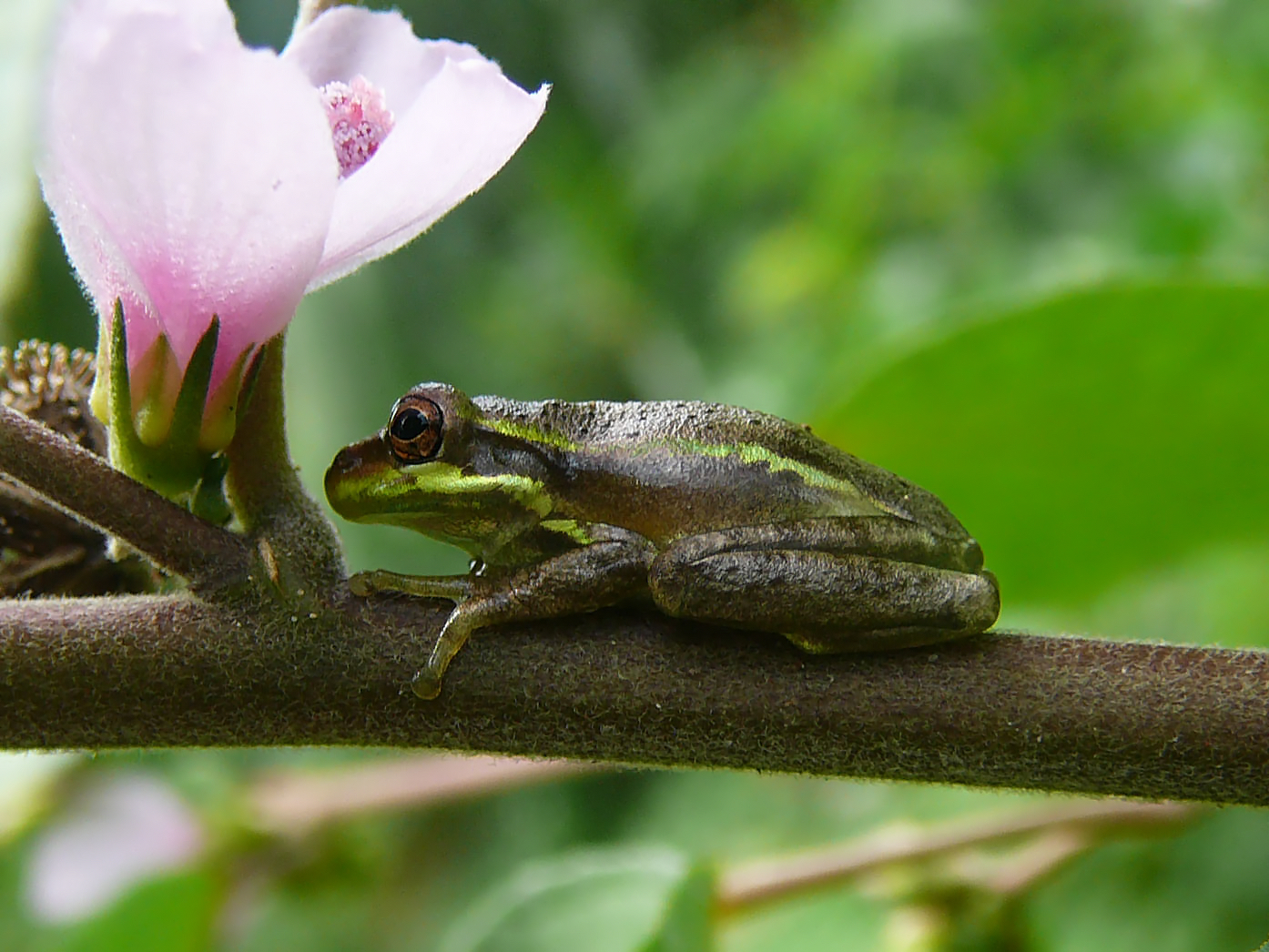
At the Fern Forest nature center in Coconut Creek Florida
