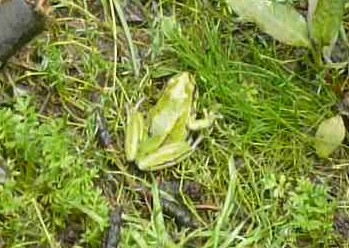

Conservation status
- Least Concern (IUCN 3.1)

Scientific classification
- Kingdom: Animalia
- Phylum: Chordata
- Class: Amphibia
- Order: Anura
- Family: Hylidae
- Genus: Dryophytes
- Species: D. plicatus

Binomial name
- Dryophytes plicatus (Brocchi, 1877)

Synonyms
- Hyla plicata Brocchi, 1877

= Ridged tree frog =

Species of amphibian

The ridged tree frog (Dryophytes plicatus) is a species of frog in the family Hylidae endemic to Mexico. Its natural habitats include mountainous pine-fir forests in high elevations. In lower elevations it is known to inhabit moderate and low-lying streams and ponds where it is believed to breed.

It is also found in subtropical or tropical moist montane forests, subtropical or tropical seasonally wet or flooded lowland grassland, rivers, intermittent freshwater marshes, rural gardens, heavily degraded former forests, and ponds.
