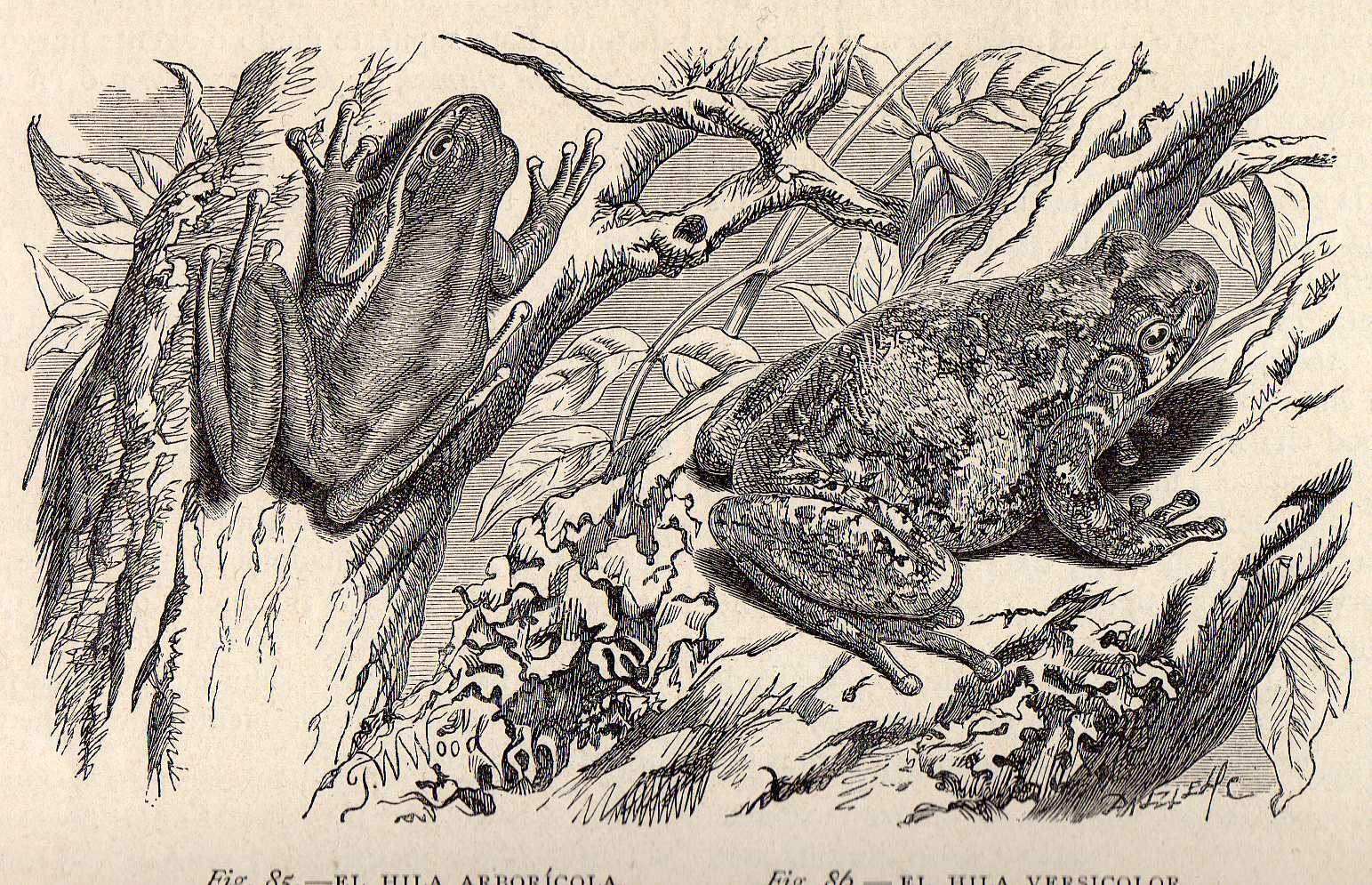
- Illustration of D. arboricola (left) with D. versicolor (right)

Conservation status
- Vulnerable (IUCN 3.1)

Scientific classification
- Kingdom: Animalia
- Phylum: Chordata
- Class: Amphibia
- Order: Anura
- Family: Hylidae
- Genus: Dryophytes
- Species: D. arboricola

Binomial name
- Dryophytes arboricola (Taylor, 1941)

Synonyms
- Hyla arboricola Taylor, 1941

= Dryophytes arboricola =

Species of amphibian

Dryophytes arboricola, commonly known as the arboreal treefrog, is a species of frog in the family Hylidae endemic to the Sierra Madre del Sur in Guerrero state, Mexico.

Dryophytes arboricola is a poorly known frog. It is assumed to be a montane forest species that breeds in temporary pools. It is probably impacted by habitat loss.
