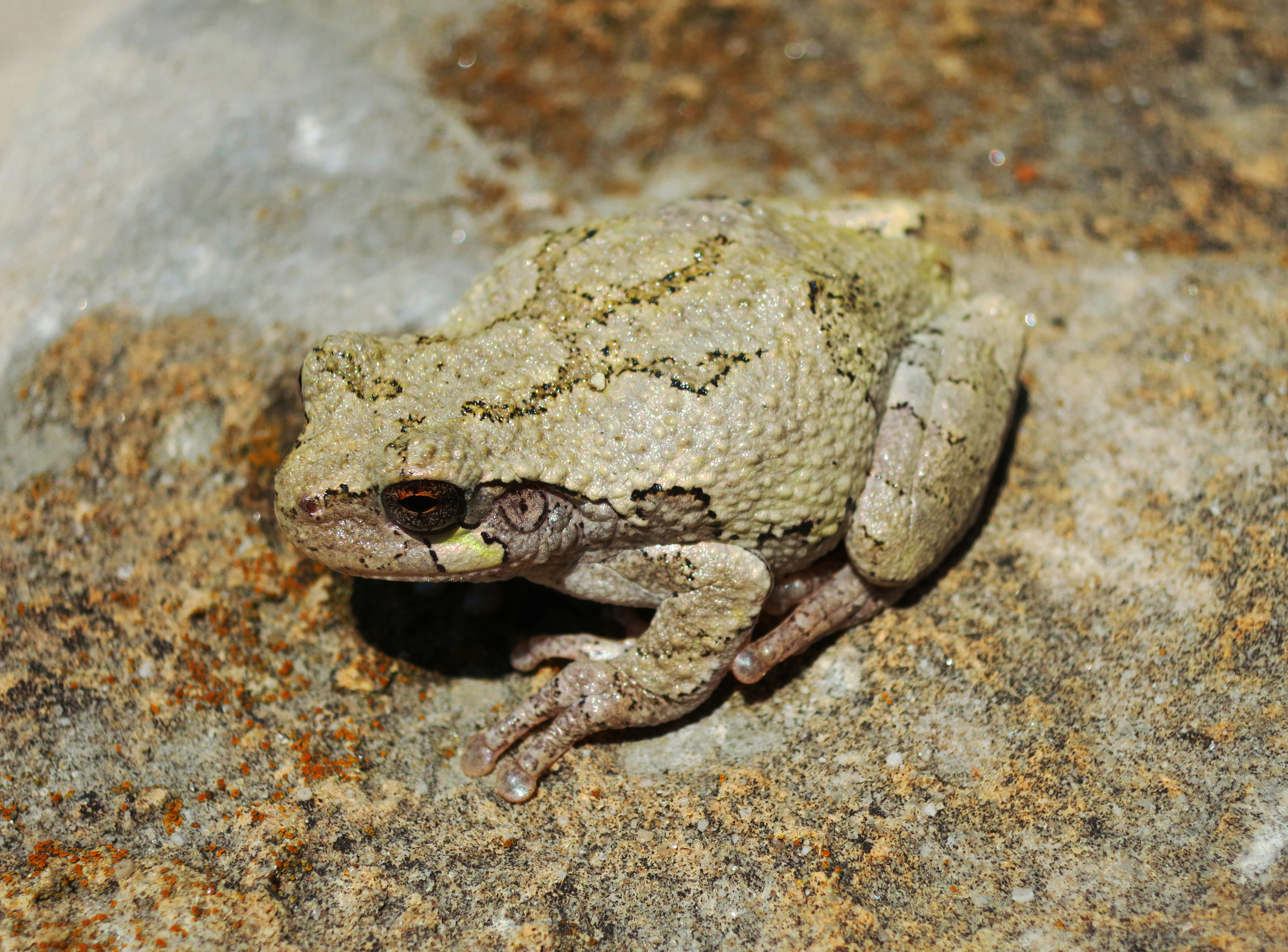
- Gray tree frog (Dryophytes versicolor)

Scientific classification
- Kingdom: Animalia
- Phylum: Chordata
- Class: Amphibia
- Order: Anura
- Family: Hylidae
- Subfamily: Hylinae
- Genus: Dryophytes; Fitzinger, 1843

Species
- See text

= Dryophytes =

Genus of amphibians

Dryophytes is a genus of Ameroasian tree frogs in the family Hylidae. Species of the genus are found mostly in North America, but the genus also includes five species found in eastern Asia.

== Description ==
Dryophytes consists of small tree-dwelling frogs, usually green or gray in color. They have digits ending with expanded discs which help them to stick to surfaces like trees.

== Habitat ==
Tree frogs of the genus Dryophytes are found in wetlands throughout their range, as well as in temperate forests both on the ground and in trees.

== Taxonomy ==
The genus Dryophytes was first described by Fitzinger in 1843. Later it was placed into the genus Hyla, the true tree frogs, by Boulenger in 1882. Fouquette and Dubois 2014, treated Dryophytes as a subgenus of Hyla. Dryophytes was finally resurrected as an independent genus by Duellman et al. in 2016.

Only geographical, rather than morphological, differences separate Dryophytes from the genus Hyla. Hyla is found only in the Old World, whereas Dryophytes is distributed in the New World and Asia. Most members occur in North America, but five species are found in eastern temperate Asia; D. flaviventris, D. immaculatus, D. japonicus, D. leopardus, and D. suweonensis.

== Species ==
The genus Dryophytes contains 21 species.

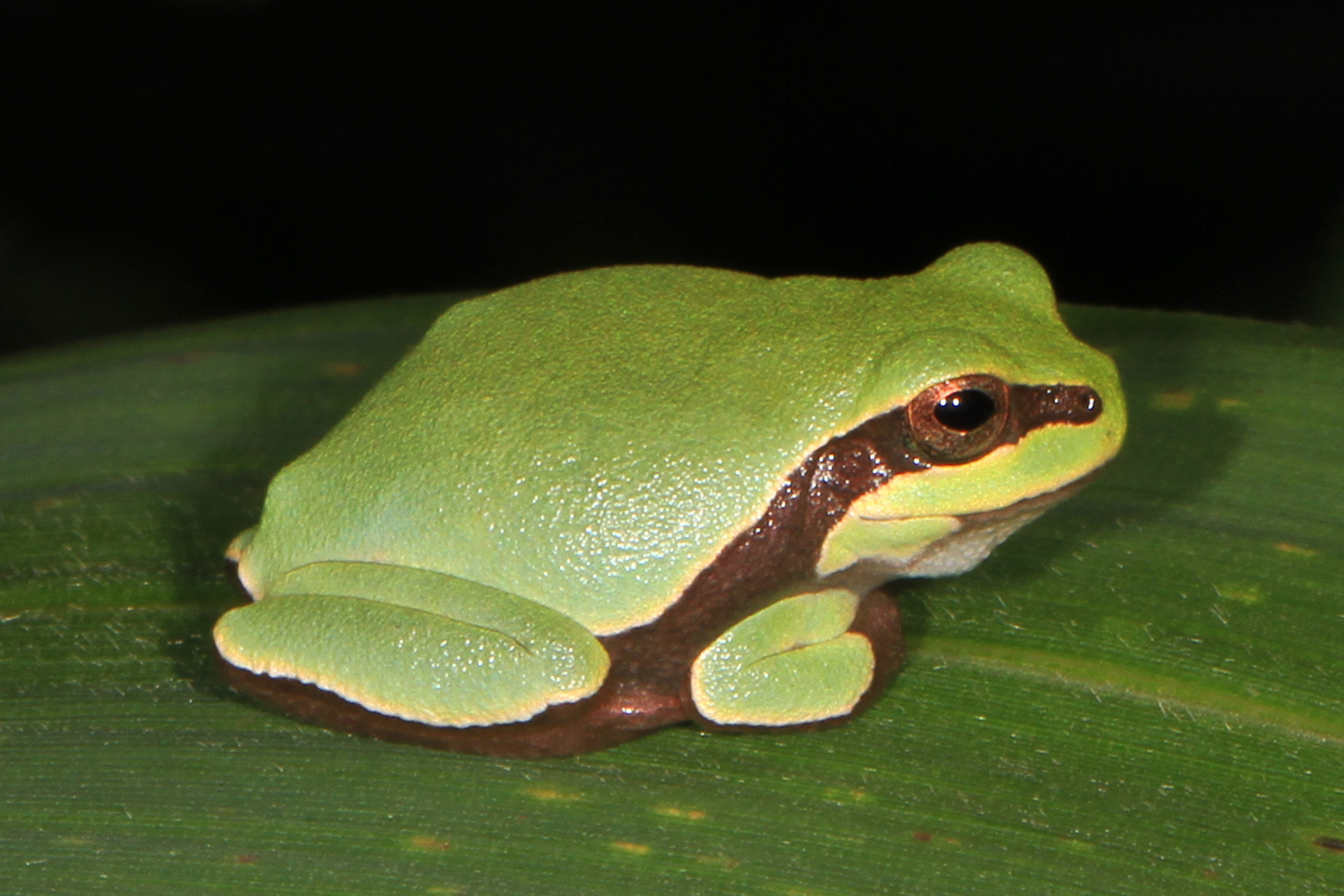
Pine Barrens treefrog (Dryophytes andersonii)

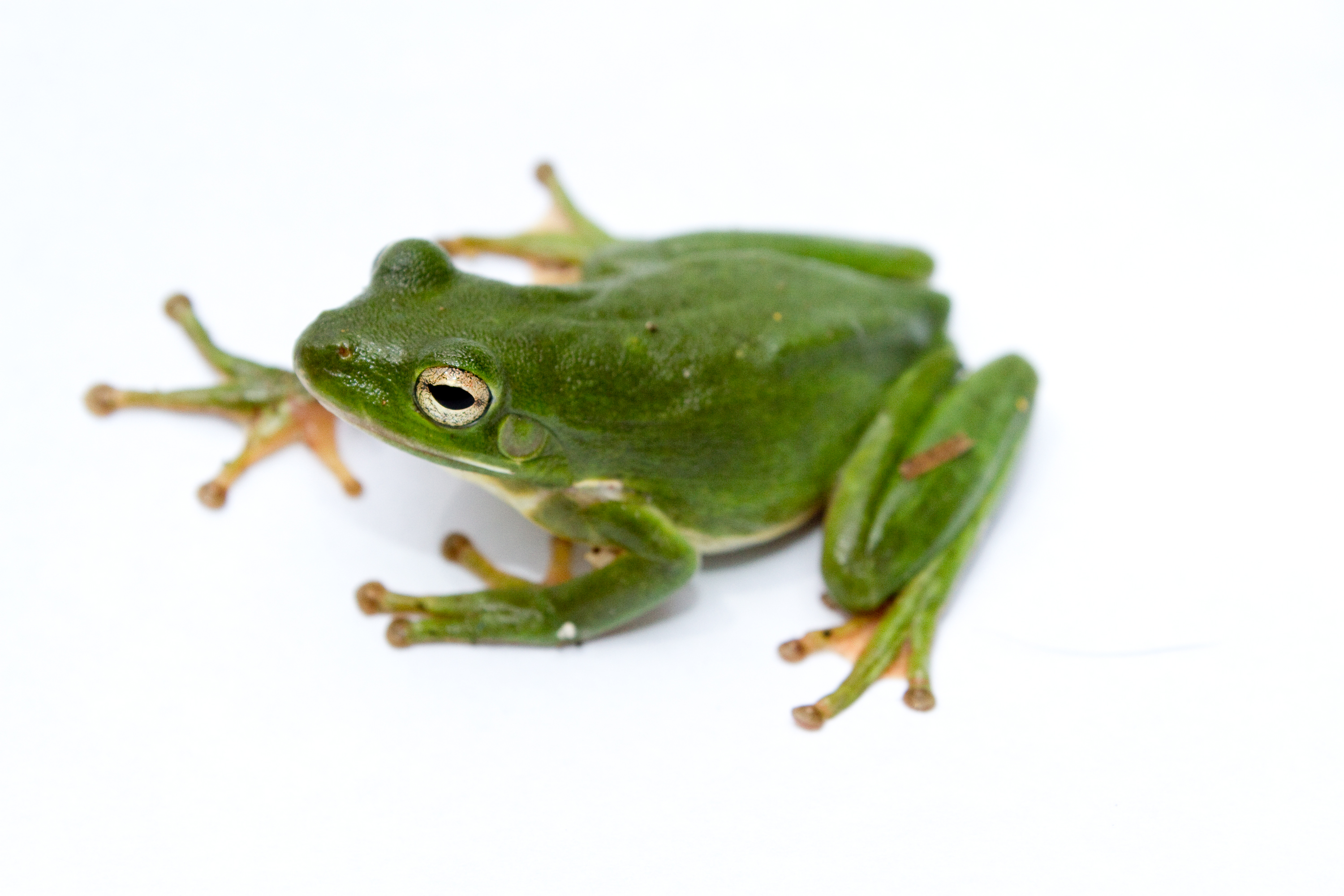
American green treefrog (Dryophytes cinereus)

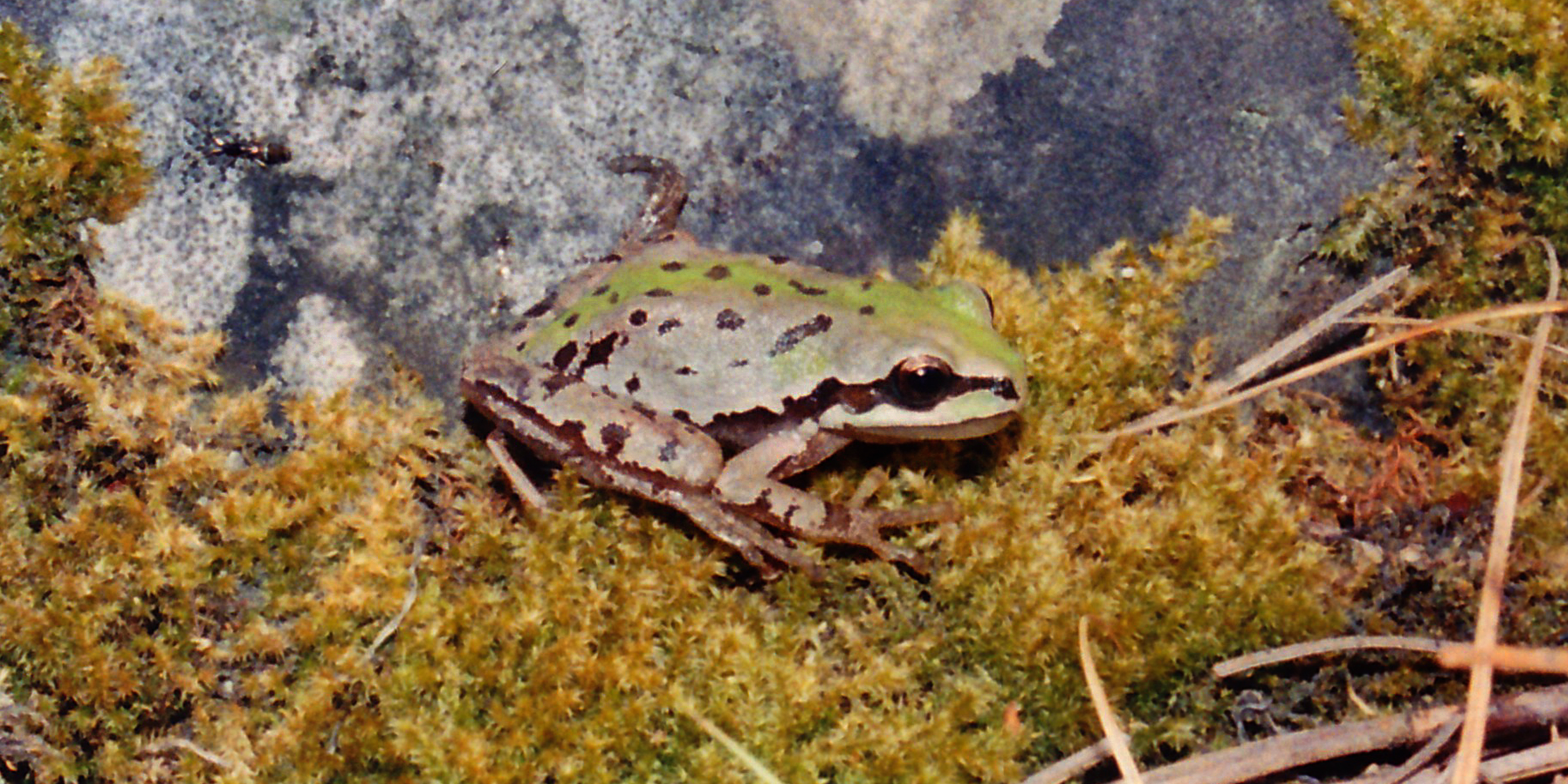
Mountain treefrog, (Dryophytes eximius), Municipality of Gómez Farías, Tamaulipas, Mexico (27 May 2005).

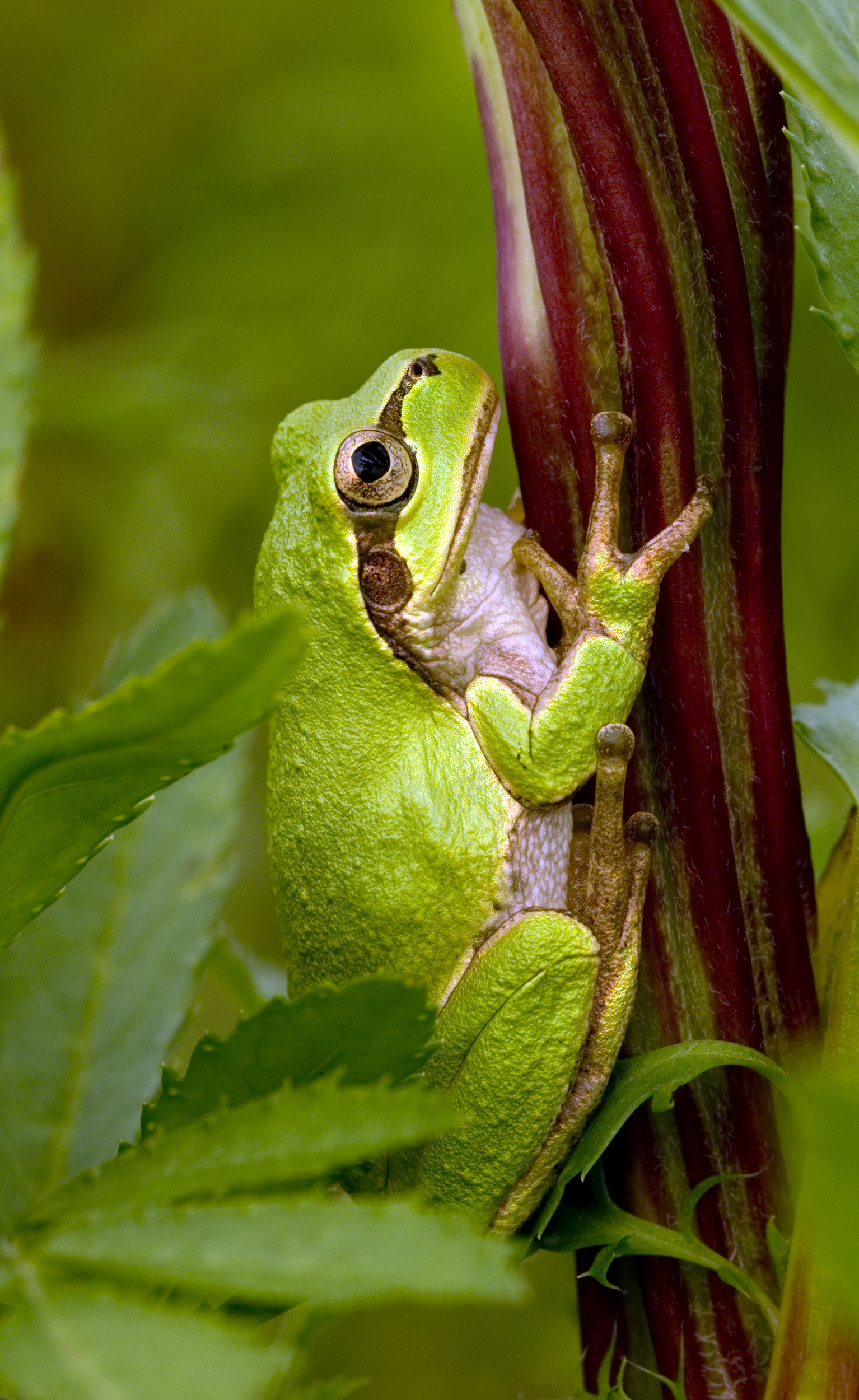
Eastern Japanese treefrog(Dryophytes leopardus)

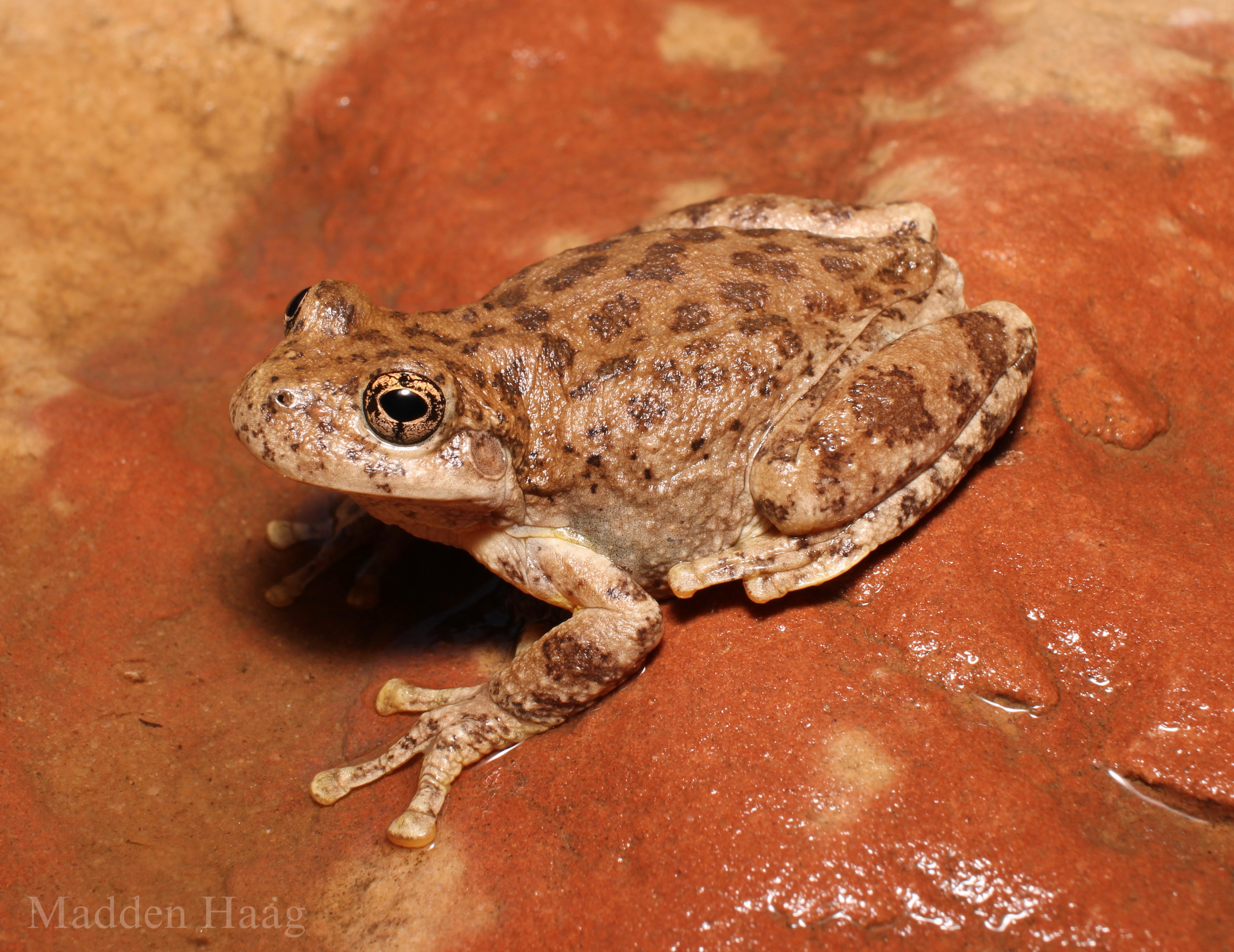
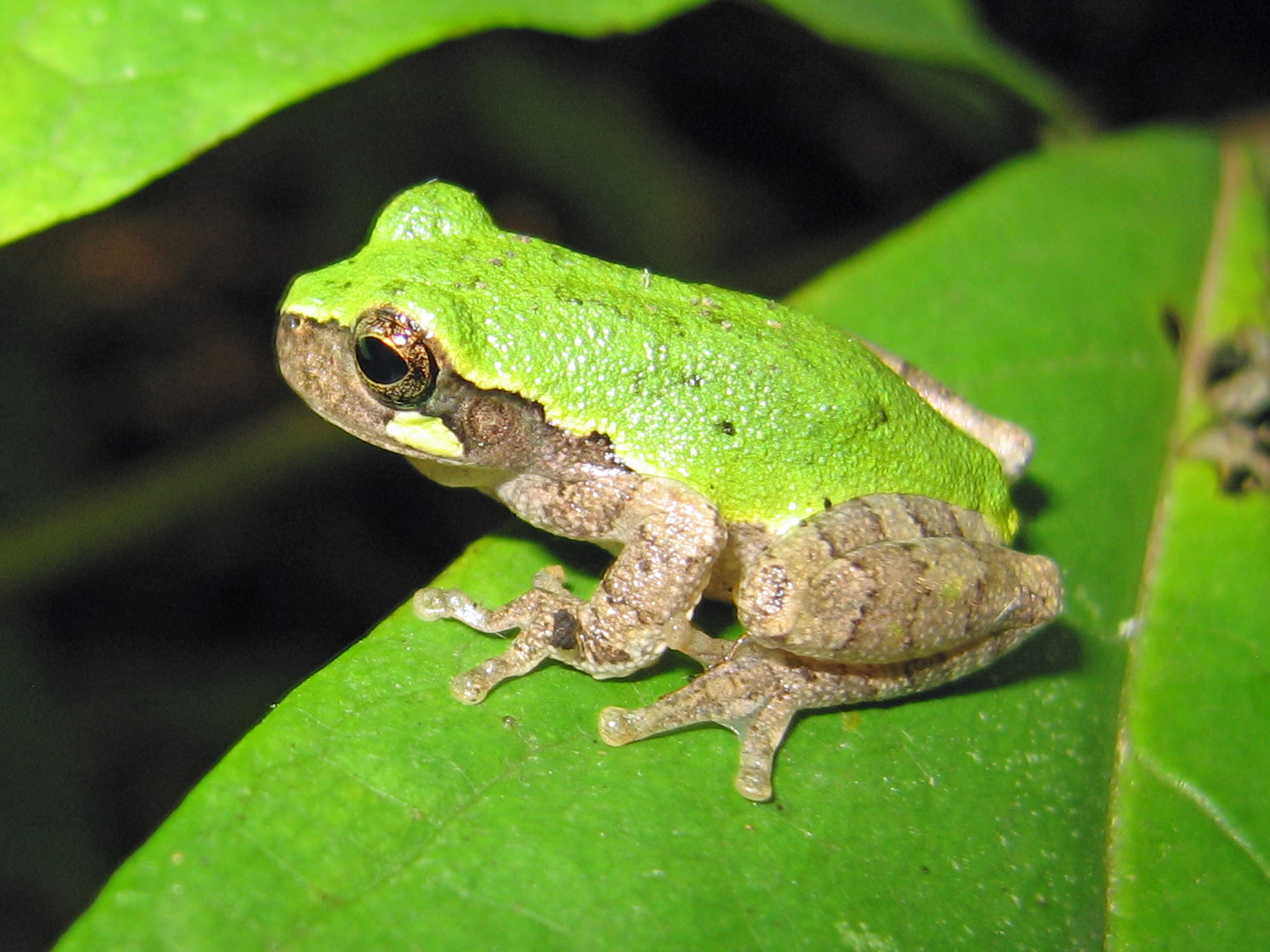
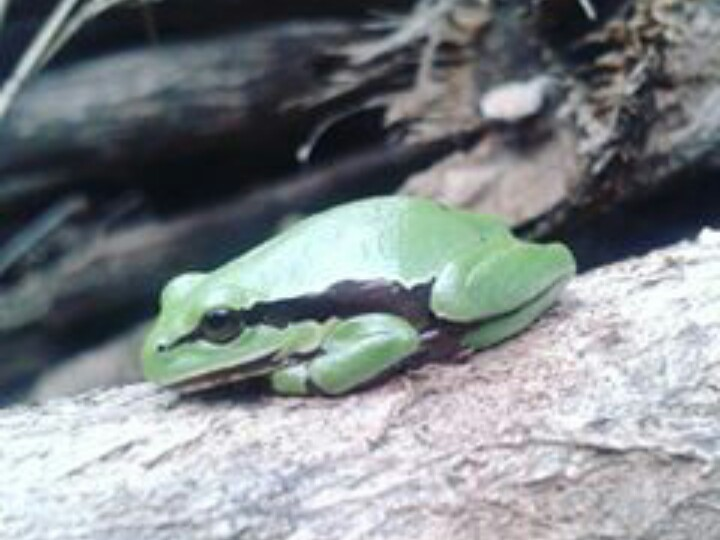
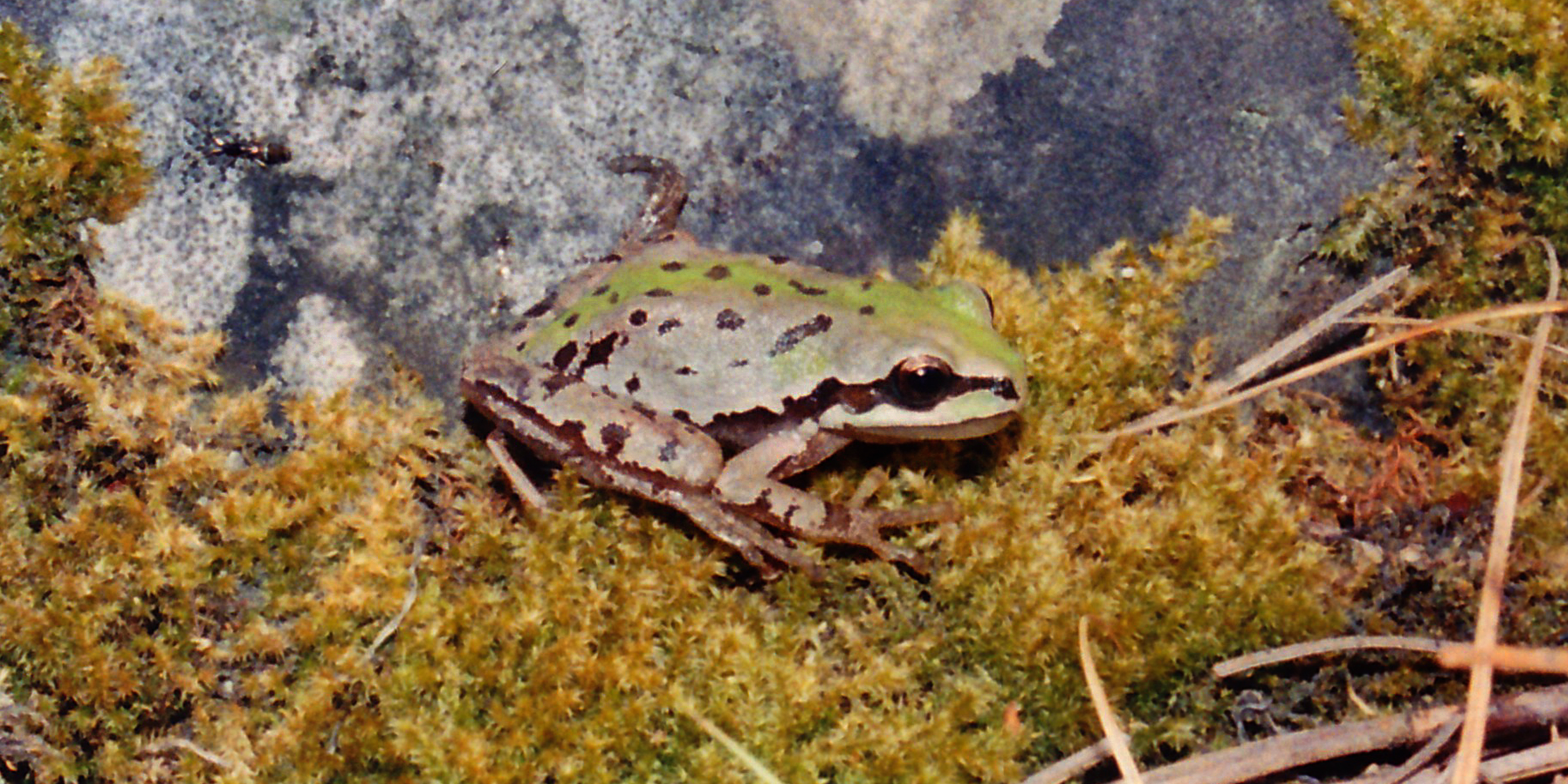
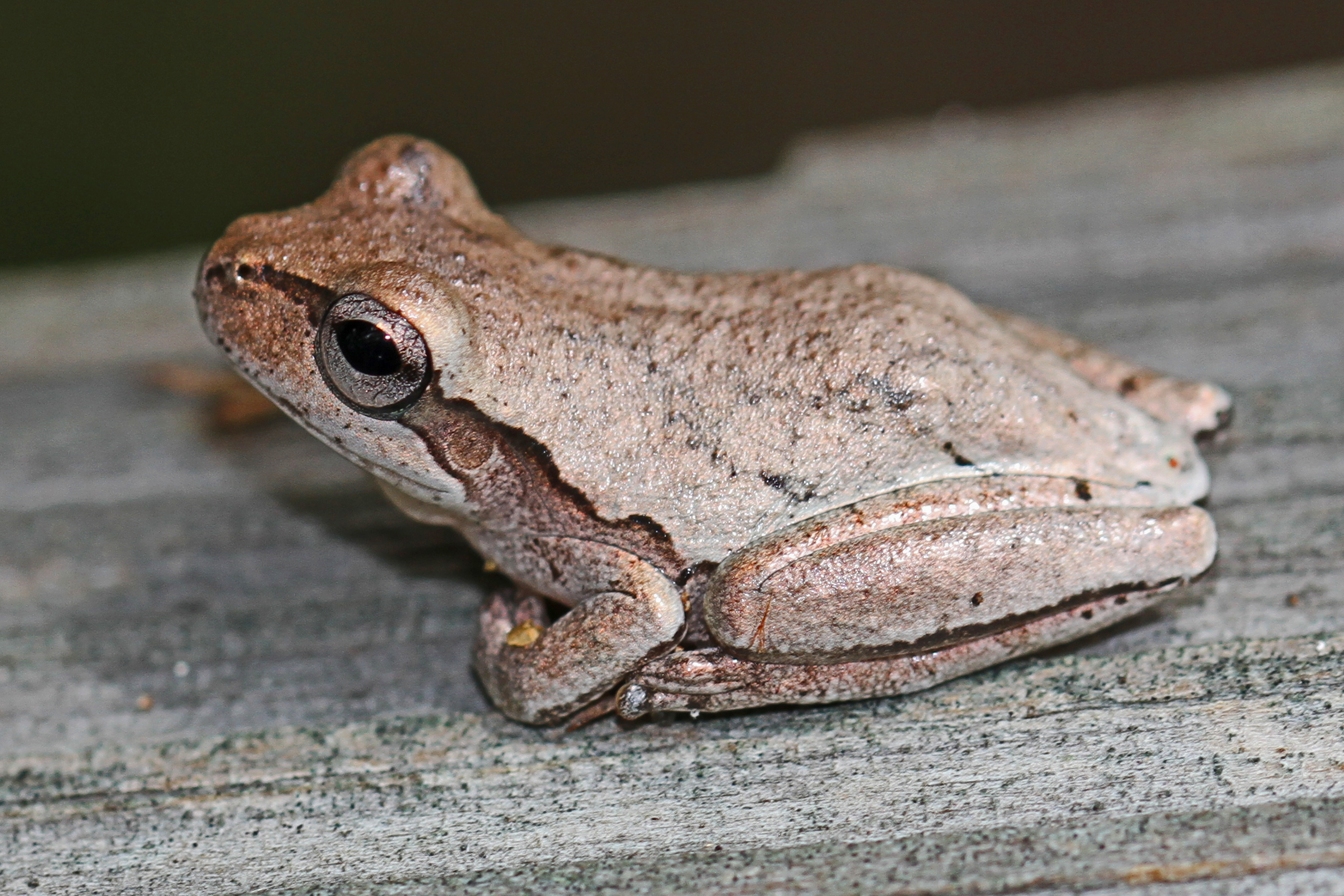
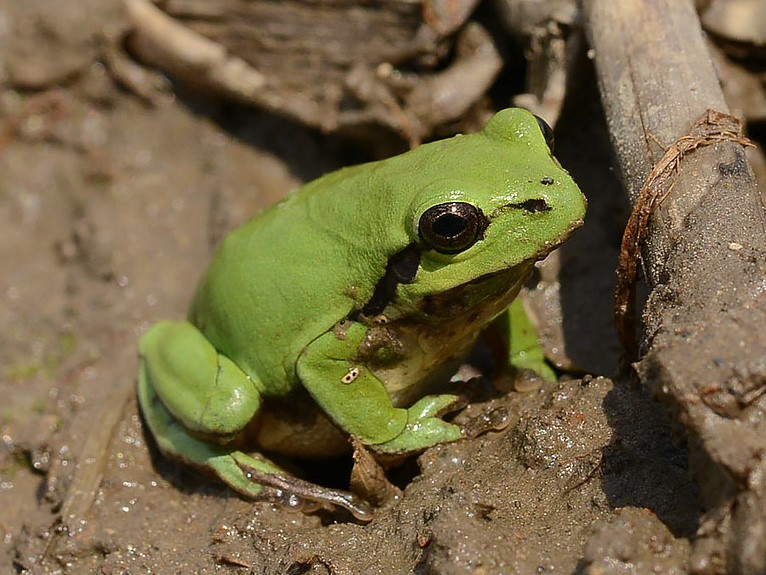
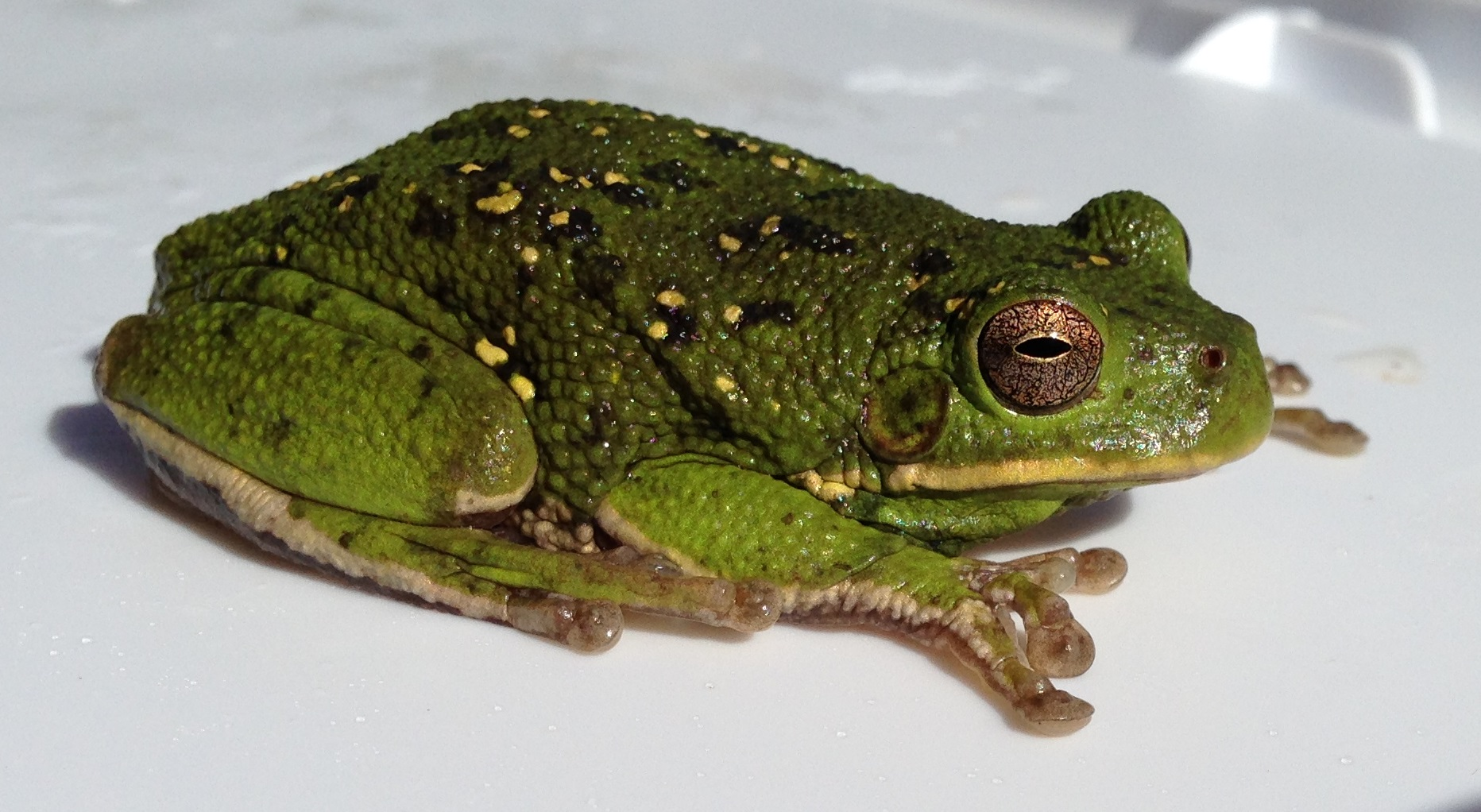
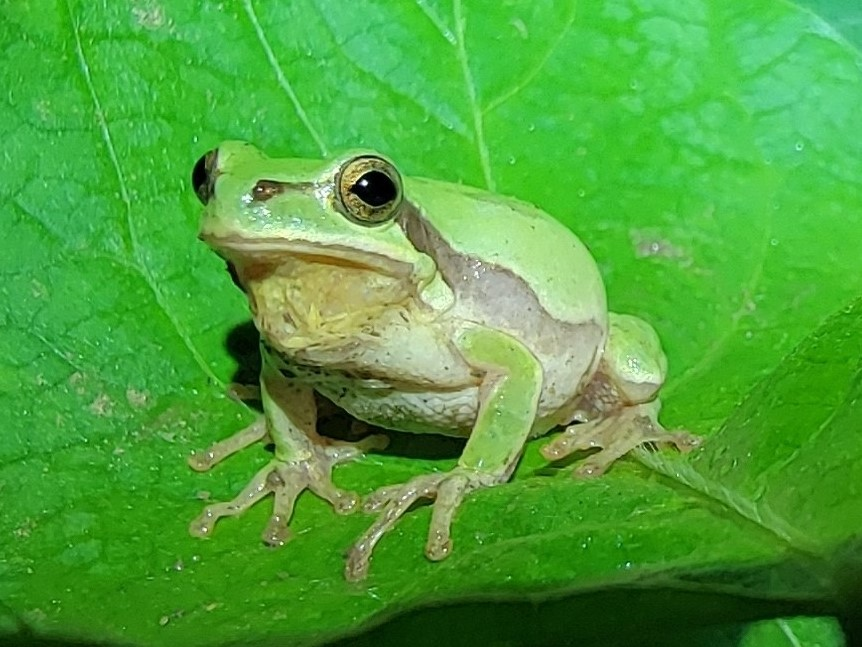
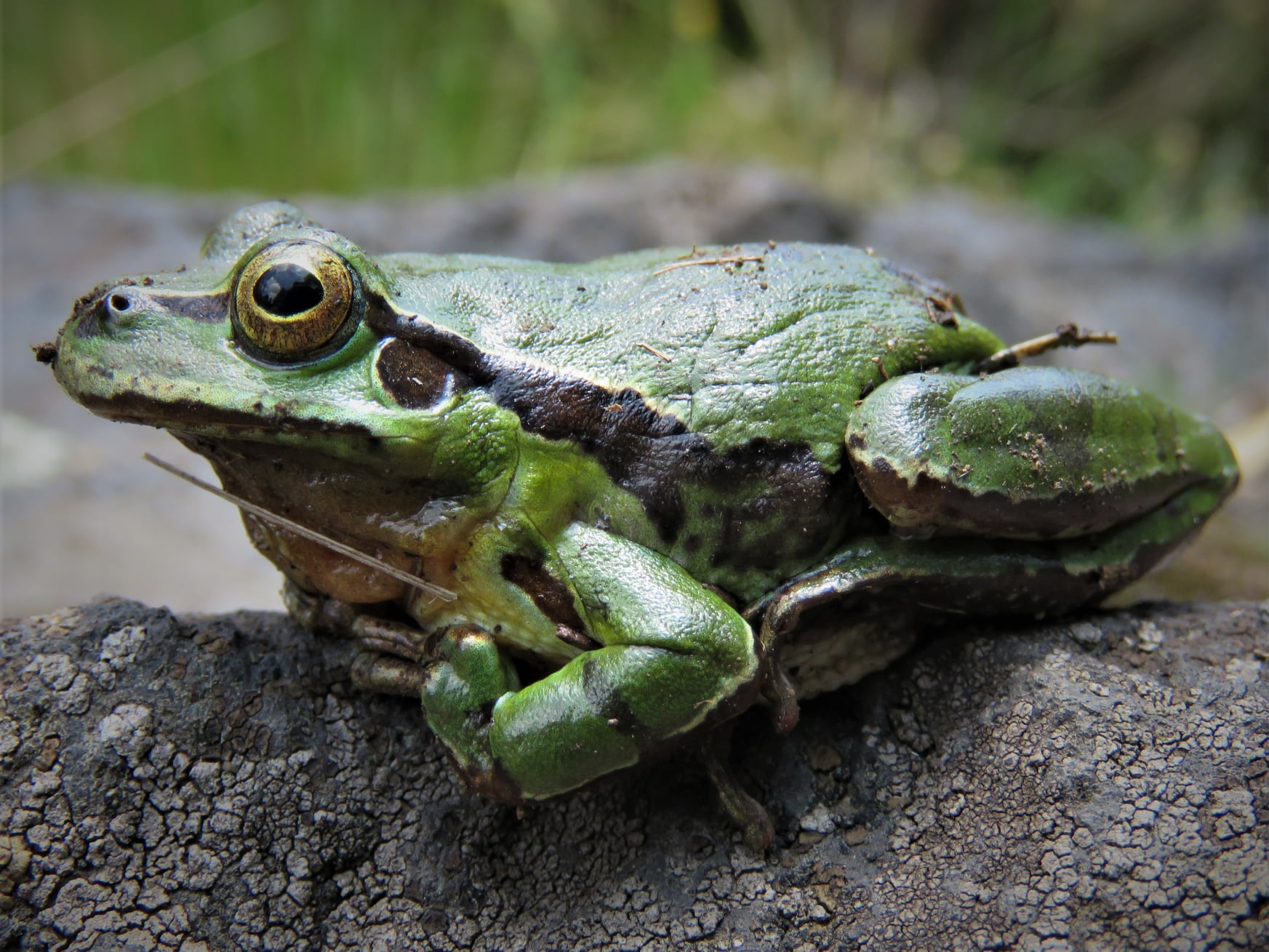
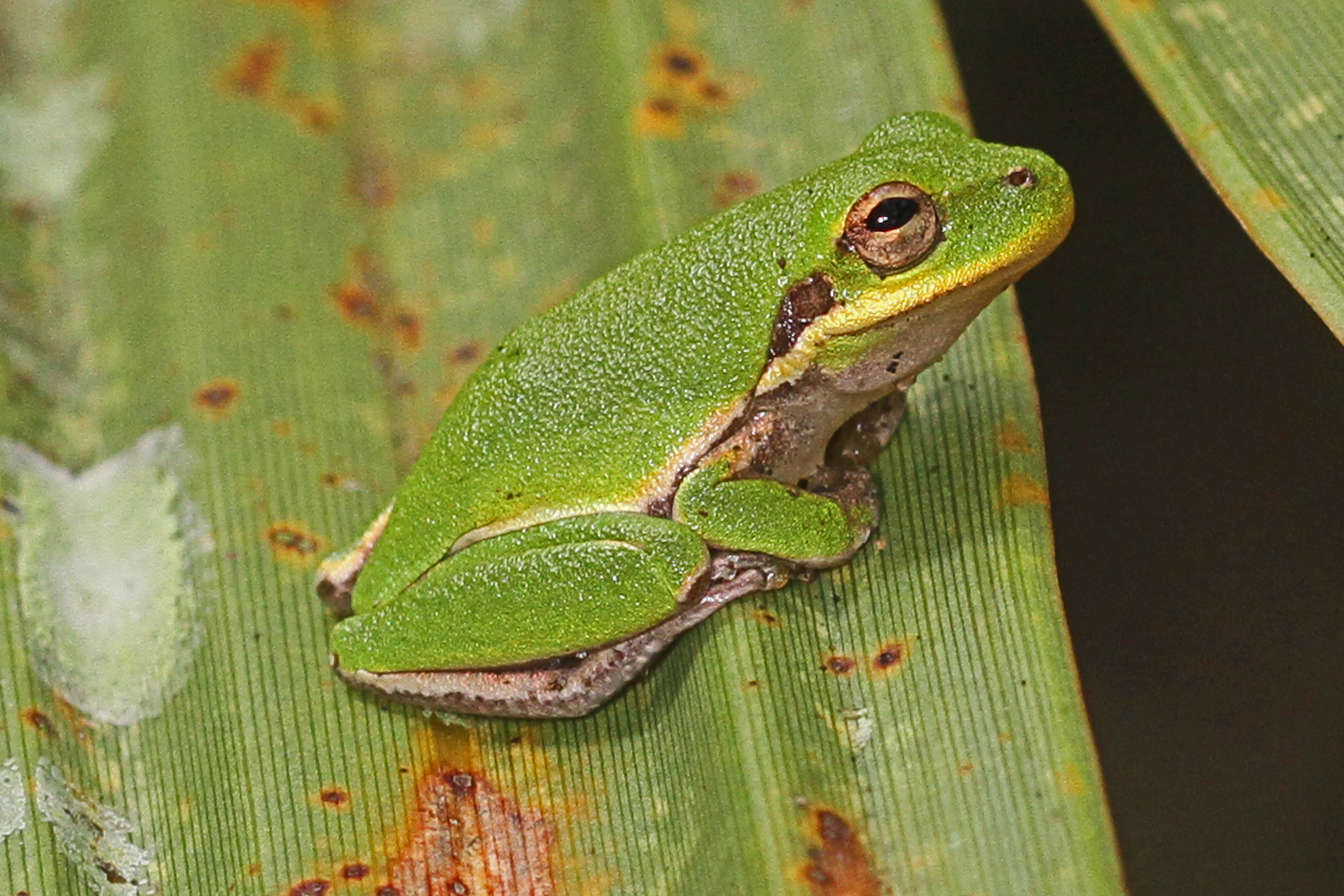
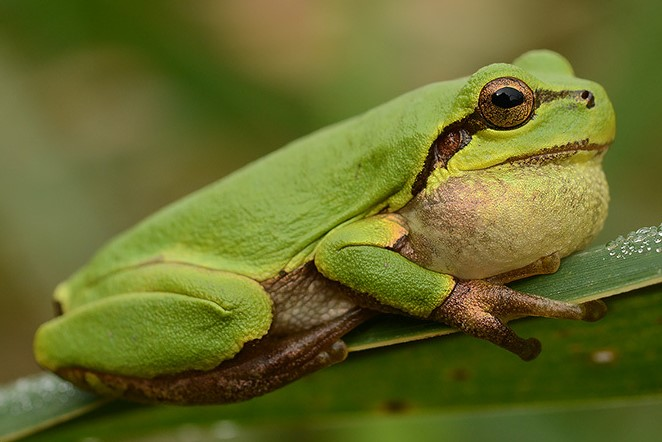
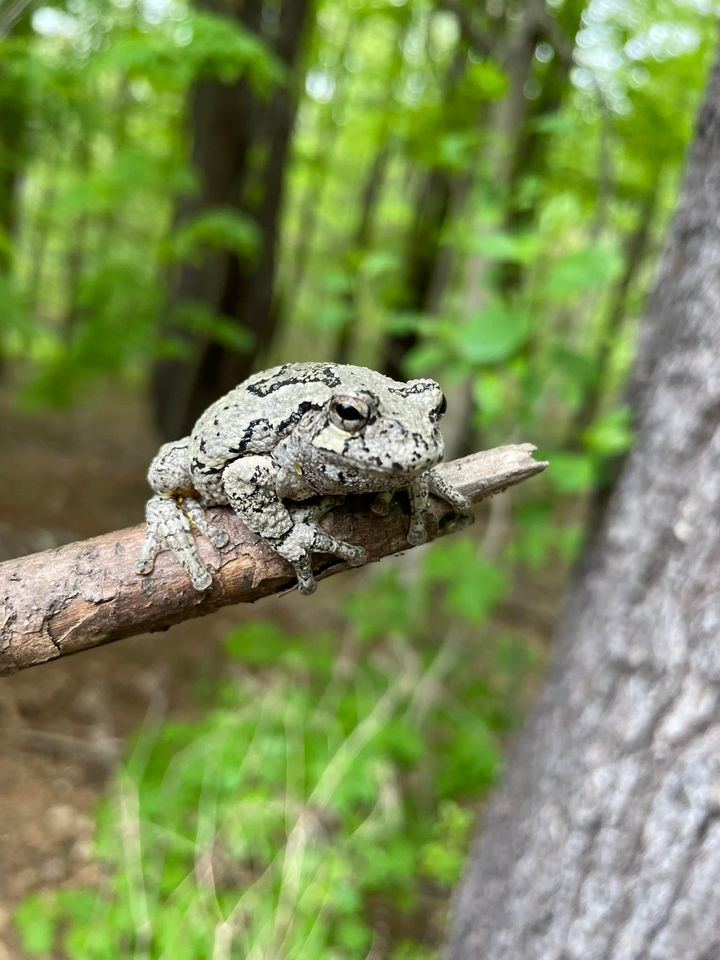
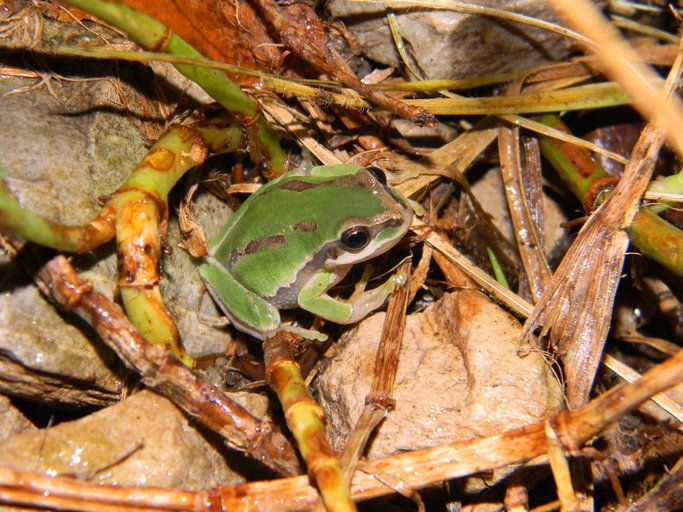
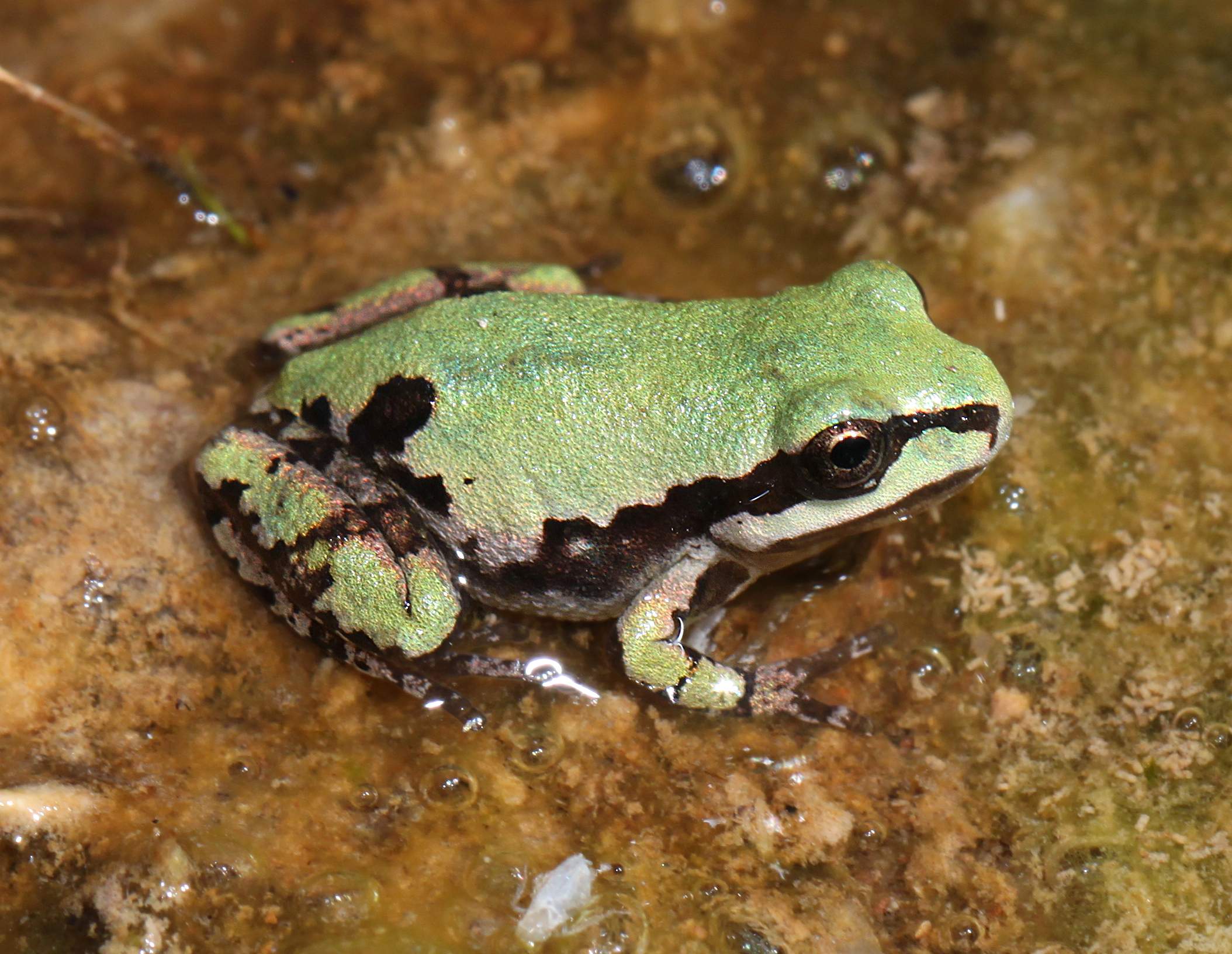
Image	Binomial name and author	Common name
	Dryophytes andersonii (Baird, 1854)	Pine Barrens treefrog
	Dryophytes aboricola (Taylor, 1941)	arboreal treefrog
	Dryophytes arenicolor (Cope, 1866)	canyon tree frog
	Dryophytes avivocus (Viosca, 1928)	bird-voiced treefrog
	Dryophytes bocourti (Mocquard, 1899)	Bocourt's tree frog
	Dryophytes chrysoscelis (Cope, 1880)	Cope's gray treefrog
	Dryophytes cinereus (Schneider, 1799)	American green tree frog
	Dryophytes euphorbiaceus (Günther, 1858)	southern highland tree frog
	Dryophytes eximius (Baird, 1854)	mountain treefrog
	Dryophytes femoralis (Daudin, 1800)	pine woods treefrog
	Dryophytes flaviventris (Borzée & Min, 2019)	yellow-bellied treefrog
	Dryophytes gratiosus (Le Conte, 1856)	barking treefrog
	Dryophytes immaculatus (Boettger, 1888)	spotless tree toad
	Dryophytes japonicus (Günther, 1859)	Japanese treefrog
	Dryophytes leopardus Shimada & Matsui, 2025	Eastern Japanese treefrog
	Dryophytes plicatus (Brocchi, 1877)	ridged tree frog
	Dryophytes squirellus (Daudin, 1800)	squirrel treefrog
	Dryophytes suweonensis (Kuramoto, 1980)	Suweon treefrog
	Dryophytes versicolor (LeConte, 1825)	gray treefrog
	Dryophytes walkeri (Stuart, 1954)	Walker's tree frog
	Dryophytes wrightorum (Taylor, 1939)	Wright's mountain tree frog
