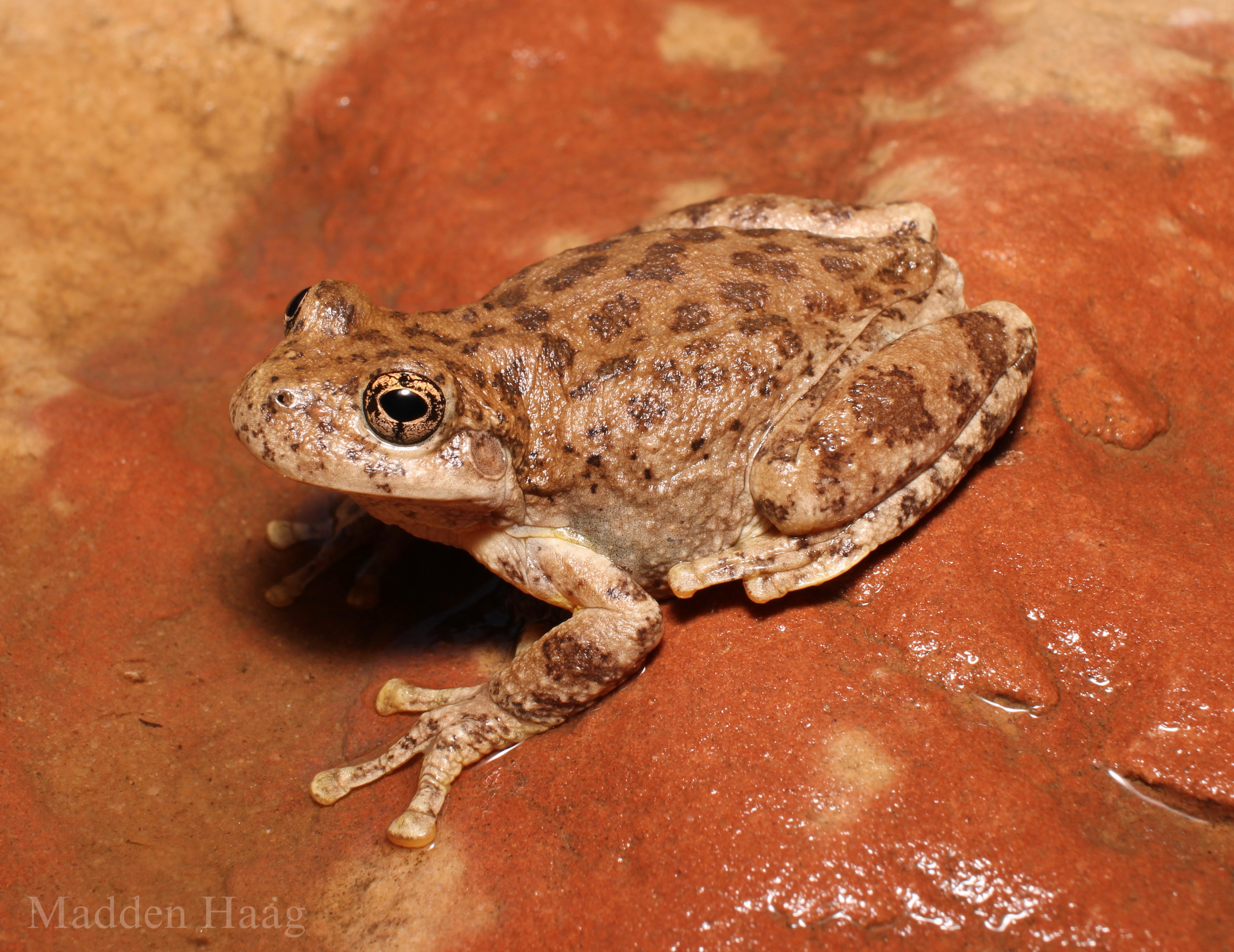
- In Zion National Park, Utah

Conservation status
- Least Concern (IUCN 3.1)

Scientific classification
- Kingdom: Animalia
- Phylum: Chordata
- Class: Amphibia
- Order: Anura
- Family: Hylidae
- Genus: Dryophytes
- Species: D. arenicolor

Binomial name
- Dryophytes arenicolor (Cope, 1866)

Synonyms
- Hyla copii Boulenger, 1887; Hyla affinis Baird, 1854; Hyliola digueti Mocquard, 1899; Hylarana fusca Baird, 1859; Hyla arenicolor Cope, 1866

= Canyon tree frog =

Species of amphibian

The canyon tree frog (Dryophytes arenicolor) is a species of tree frog native to the rocky plateau areas of southern United States, primarily in New Mexico and Arizona, but it also ranges to Utah, Texas, and Colorado, and as far south as the Mexican states of Michoacán, México, Guanajuato, Guerrero, and Oaxaca.

== Description ==
Canyon tree frogs grow to 5.0–5.5 cm (2.0–2.2 in) in length, and are typically brown, grey-brown, or grey-green in color, often with darker-colored blotching. They can vary considerably, but usually match the soil or rock coloration of their native habitats to serve as camouflage. Those from limestone habitats are lighter colored, and those from regions composed mostly of granite can even be pink in coloration. Most have bright yellow in their groin regions, and faded banding on their legs.

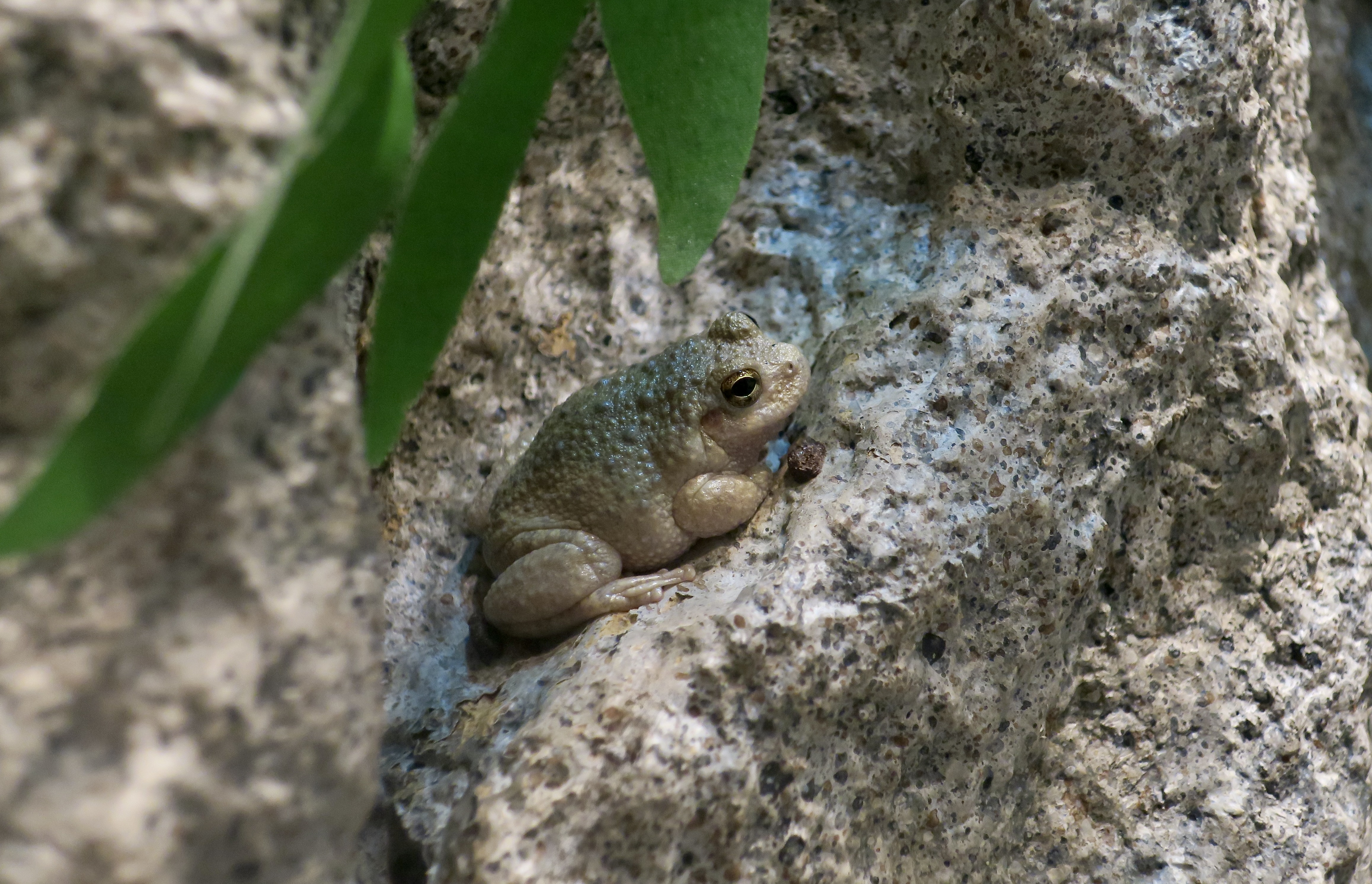
At Arizona-Sonora Desert Museum.

== Behavior ==
Canyon tree frogs are mostly nocturnal and carnivorous. They are typically found in semiarid, rocky habitats near a permanent water source. Breeding occurs during the spring rains, and large, floating egg masses of 100 or more eggs are laid on the water. During periods of low rainfall, the frogs will take refuge in rock/bolder crevices.
