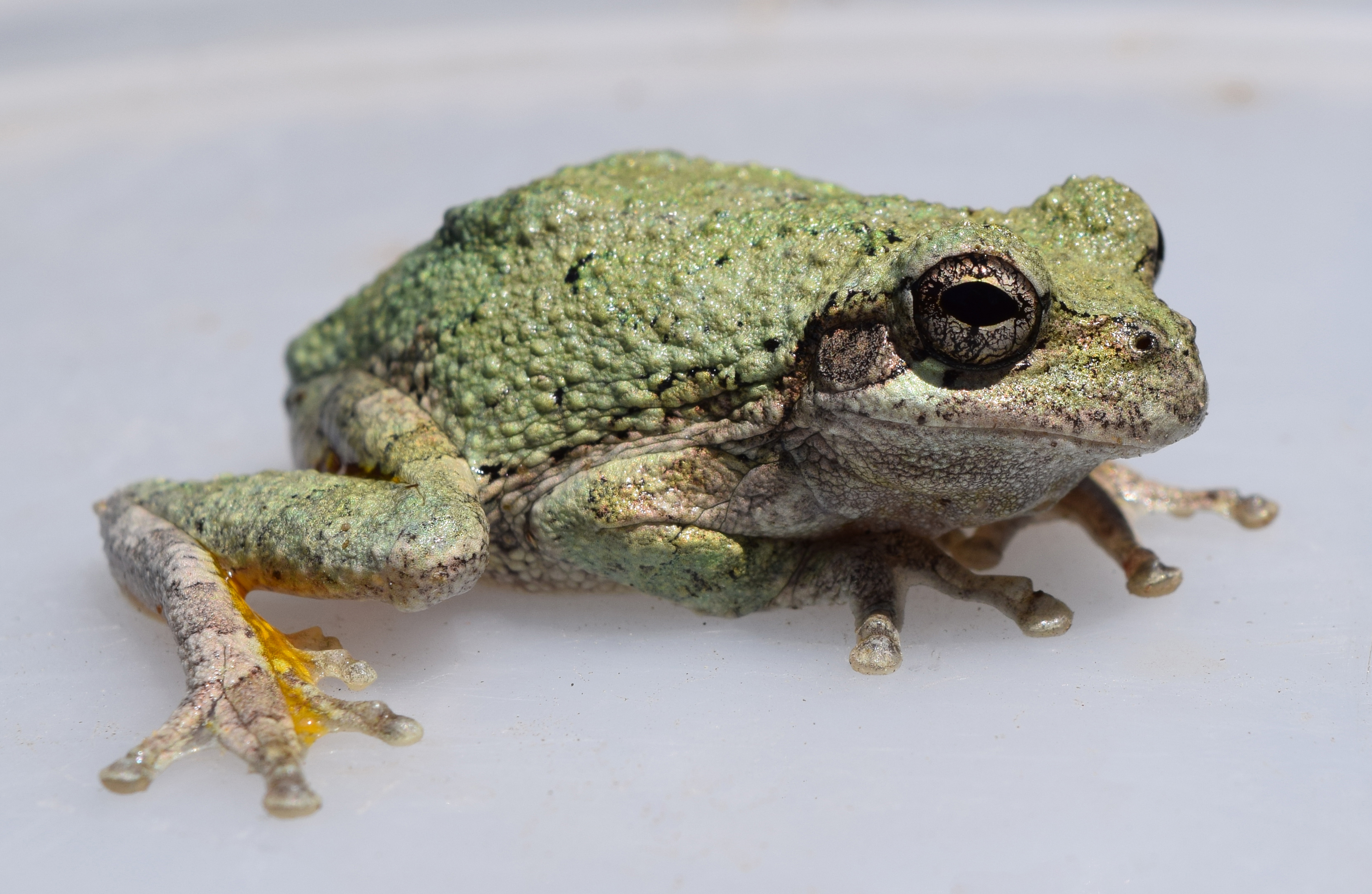

Conservation status
- Least Concern (IUCN 3.1)

Scientific classification
- Kingdom: Animalia
- Phylum: Chordata
- Class: Amphibia
- Order: Anura
- Family: Hylidae
- Genus: Dryophytes
- Species: D. chrysoscelis

Binomial name
- Dryophytes chrysoscelis (Cope, 1880)

Synonyms
- Hyla chrysoscelis Cope, 1880

Audio

= Cope's gray treefrog =

Species of amphibian

Cope's gray treefrog (Dryophytes chrysoscelis) is a species of treefrog found in the United States and Canada. It is almost indistinguishable from the gray treefrog (Dryophytes versicolor), and shares much of its geographic range. Both species are variable in color, mottled gray to gray-green, resembling the bark of trees. These are treefrogs of woodland habitats, though they will sometimes travel into more open areas to reach a breeding pond. The only readily noticeable difference between the two species is the mating call — Cope's has a faster-paced and slightly higher-pitched call than D. versicolor. In addition, D. chrysoscelis is reported to be slightly smaller, more arboreal, and more tolerant of dry conditions than D. versicolor.

== Taxonomy ==
Edward Drinker Cope described the species in 1880. The specific name, chrysoscelis, is from Greek chrysos, gold, and scelis, leg.

Microscopic inspection of the chromosomes of D. chrysoscelis and D. versicolor reveals differences in chromosome number. D. chrysoscelis is diploid, having two complete sets of chromosomes, the usual condition in vertebrates. D. versicolor is tetraploid, having double the usual number of chromosomes. Generally, D. versicolor is believed to have evolved from D. chrysoscelis in the last major ice age, when areas of extremely low temperatures divided populations. Despite currently sharing habitat, the two species generally do not interbreed.

D. chrysoscelis is known to be largely intersterile with D. versicolor but there may be a limited amount of interfertility in sympatry. To enforce speciation there may be unknown mechanisms of reinforcement deployed between these species and further research may be fruitful.

== Description ==
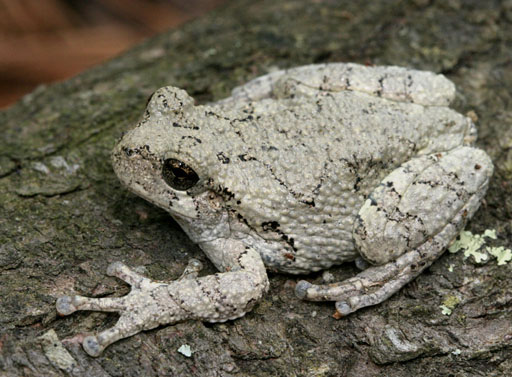
Showing variation in color

D. chrysoscelis (Cope's gray treefrog) is almost indistinguishable from D. versicolor (the gray treefrog). Both species vary in color from mottled gray to gray-green, resembling the bark of trees. Also, both have black-marked bright orange to yellow patches on their hind legs, which distinguishes them from similar-looking species such as the bird-voiced treefrog (D. avivoca). D. avivoca is also smaller, at 2.5–5 cm (0.98–1.97 in) in length, vs 3.2–5.1 cm (1.3–2.0 in) for D. chrysoscelis and 3.2–6.2 cm (1.3–2.4 in) for D. versicolor. The bright-yellow leg pattern is normally hidden, but exposed when the frog leaps. This "flash pattern" likely serves to startle a predator as the frog makes its escape. The pattern and color variations of skin for this species will change depending on the environment they are found in. Similar hidden bright patterns are common in various Lepidoptera, for instance moths of the genus Catocala. Both species of gray treefrogs are slightly sexually dimorphic. Males have black or gray throats in the breeding season, while the throats of the females are lighter. Usually, the younger frogs in this species will often be seen more with the greenish color throughout the breeding seasons. As they age they will lose the greenish color and move towards the distinct gray color.

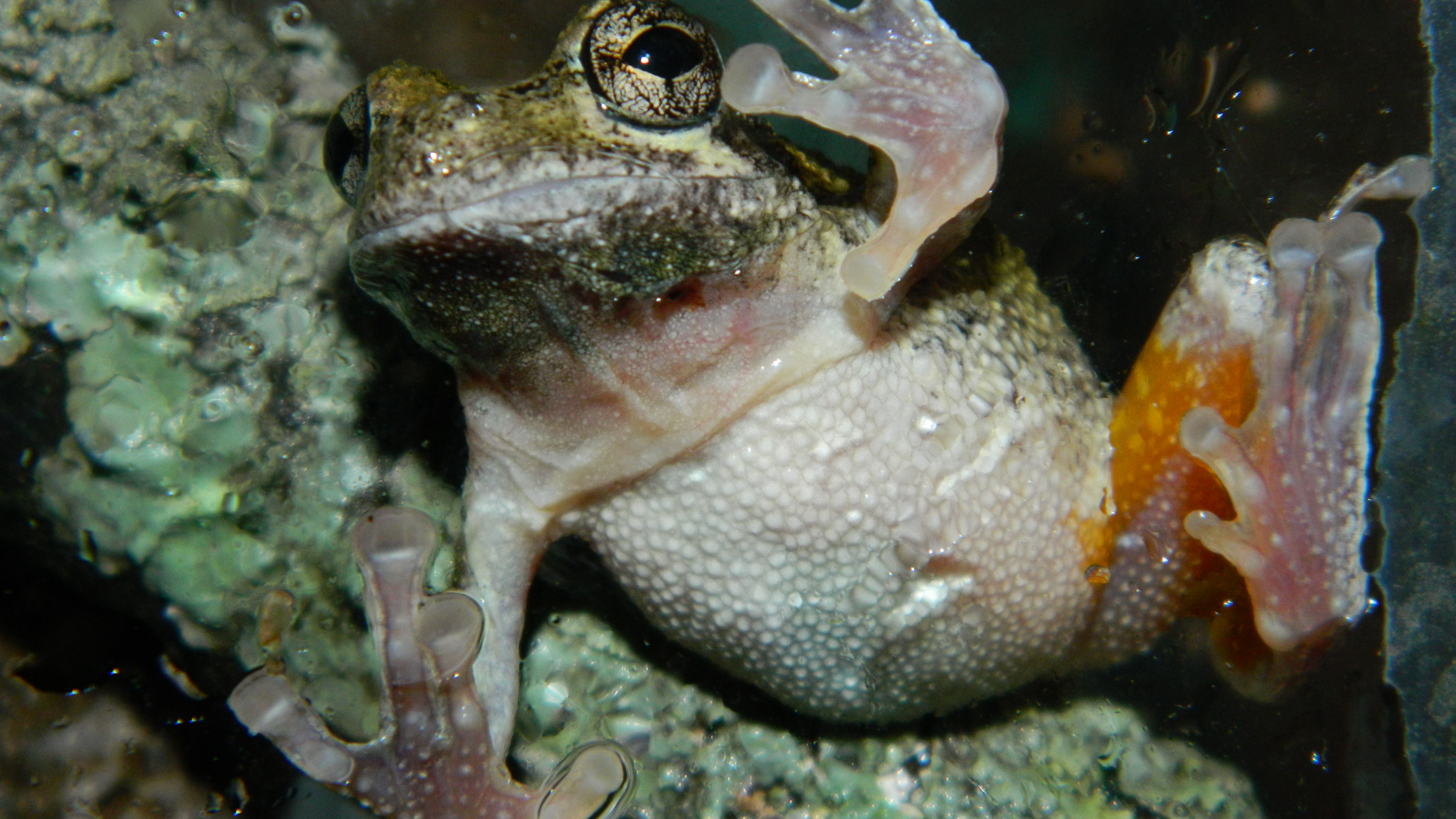
D. chrysoscelis male showing black throat

Skin secretions from this species may be irritating or toxic to mouth, eyes, other mucous membranes.

== Distribution and habitat ==
The range of D. chrysoscelis is more southerly; it is apparently the species found in the lower elevation Piedmont and Coastal Plain of Virginia and the Carolinas. In those areas, D. versicolor may be present only in the Appalachians. While this species is most abundant in the southeast, it can be found as far north as Manitoba. D. chrysoscelis has also been observed to practice freeze tolerance in a lab setting, which could help it survive in cold climates. These frogs are one of the very few that can mobilize glycerol as a cryoprotectant. Glycerol production is low when the temperature is warmer, but when it gets colder, the glycerol in the body is rapidly produced. When studying ice concentration of overwintering frogs, 40-50% of total body water was frozen. Studies have revealed that Cope's gray treefrog could be more resilient to climate change in the long-term, though populations may suffer short-term drawbacks. Either way, distribution will hopefully change little in the long-term because of this. They prefer to perch on pipes located along the edges of wetlands and close to trees, which suggests that the terrestrial habitat surrounding wetlands is an important component of the species habitat.

== Behavior ==
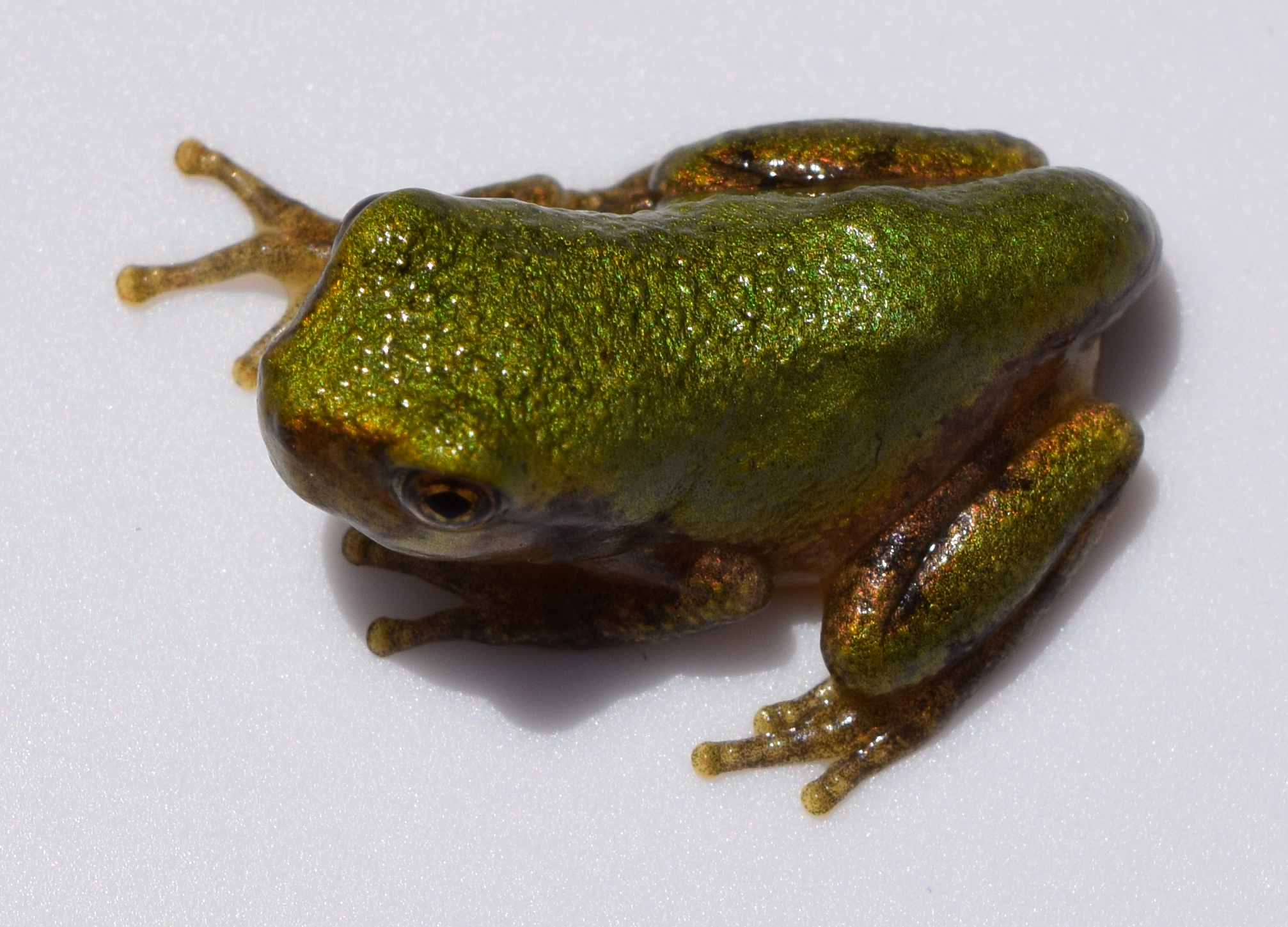
Metamorphs are typically green

Male calling.

In the Southeastern United States, Cope's gray treefrog breeds and calls from May to August. Isolated males start calling from woodland areas during warm weather a week or more before migrating to temporary ponds to breed. There they form aggregations (choruses) and call together. Chorusing is most frequent at night, but individuals often call during daytime in response to thunder or other loud noises. These individual calls are produced at high sound pressure levels (SPLs) reaching 85 to 90 dB and sustained noise levels in choruses commonly range between 70 and 80 dB SPL. Female treefrogs have been found to be able to differentiate calls at scales of up to a few decibels. Females prefer calls with average frequencies over calls with frequencies that were 2 or 3 semitones lower than the population mean. Calls higher than the average semitones do not face behavioral discrimination like the lower calls do. Eggs are laid in batches of 10 to 40 on the surfaces of shallow ponds and other small bodies of water. These temporary bodies of water usually lack fish, and females preferentially lay their eggs in water bodies that lack fish or other predatory vertebrates and have lower desiccation risk. Eggs hatch in about five days and metamorphosis takes place at about 45–65 days.

The diet of Cope's gray treefrog primarily consists of arthropods such as moths, mites, spiders, plant lice, and harvestmen. Snails have also been observed as a food source. Like most frogs, Dryophytes chrysocelis is an opportunistic feeder and may also eat smaller frogs, including other treefrogs. Once the breeding season is over, Cope's gray treefrogs will forage continuously until winter.

Cope's gray treefrog exhibits freeze tolerance. Dryophytes chrysoscelis is capable of surviving temperatures as low as −8 °C (18 °F). They can withstand the physiological challenges of corporeal freezing, by accumulating cryoprotective compounds of hepatic origin, including glycerol, urea, and glucose. During this period of cold acclimation, individuals cease eating, lower their heart rate, decrease body mass, and their righting response and toe pinch reflexes become much slower. It is one of a few freeze tolerant frogs that use glycerol as a cryoprotectant.
