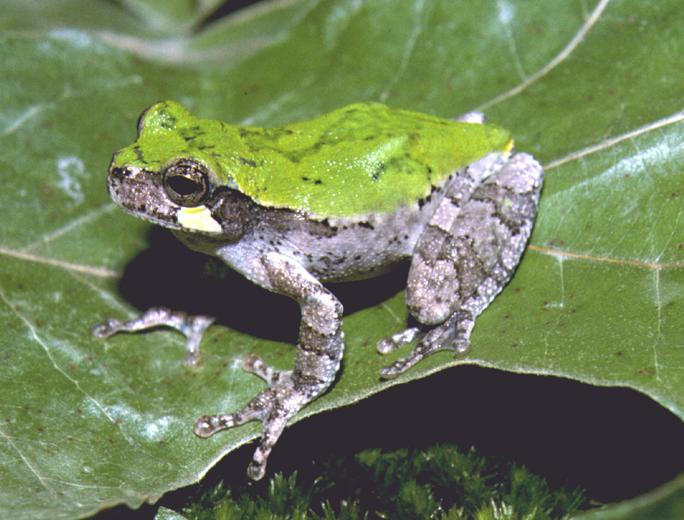

Conservation status
- Least Concern (IUCN 3.1)

Scientific classification
- Kingdom: Animalia
- Phylum: Chordata
- Class: Amphibia
- Order: Anura
- Family: Hylidae
- Genus: Dryophytes
- Species: D. avivoca

Binomial name
- Dryophytes avivoca (Viosca, 1928)

Synonyms
- Hyla avivoca Viosca, 1928

Audio
- Adult male calling

= Bird-voiced tree frog =

Species of amphibian

The bird-voiced tree frog (Dryophytes avivoca) is a species of frog in the family Hylidae, endemic to the United States. Its natural habitats are temperate forests, shrub-dominated wetlands, and swamps.

== Description ==
The bird-voiced tree frog is a small species growing to about 5 cm (2.0 in) long. It is usually a dappled, pale grey or brown on its dorsal surface, but its color changes with the temperature and its level of activity, and may be more or less pale green. It often has a dark brown cross-shaped mark on its back and further dark areas on its limbs. Its belly is grey with flashes of yellow on the underside of its hind legs. The male has a dark throat. This frog is very similar to the larger gray tree frog (Dryophytes versicolor), but that species has an orange flash on its hind legs. Both have a whitish square region just underneath the eyes. The bird-voiced tree frog is easily distinguishable during the spring and summer when it gives its characteristic call.

== Distribution and habitat ==
The bird-voiced tree frog is found over much of the southeastern United States, including Kentucky, Louisiana, Florida, Alabama, Mississippi, Georgia, South Carolina, Tennessee, Oklahoma, and Arkansas. Its favored habitat is wooded swamps near streams and rivers where the dominant species include cypress, birch, tupelo, and buttonbush.

== Behavior ==
The bird-voiced tree frog normally lives in trees, seldom descending to the ground except to breed. It is nocturnal and emerges at dusk to forage for insects and other small invertebrates. Breeding takes place in late spring and early summer, usually after heavy rains. The male calls from bushes and low vegetation close to the edge of temporary pools or ponds. The sound is a rapid, repetitive "wit-wit-wit-wit". The female lays a number of batches of six to fifteen eggs in shallow water. The tadpole stage lasts for about a month and the newly metamorphosed juvenile frogs are often seen in bushes or dispersing to other localities in wet weather.

== Status ==
The bird-voiced tree frog is listed as being of "Least Concern" in the IUCN Red List of Threatened Species. It seems to have large populations in the areas in which it occurs and there seems to be no noticeable decline in numbers. Clearing or draining the swamps in which it lives would be deleterious, but is not happening to any great extent.
