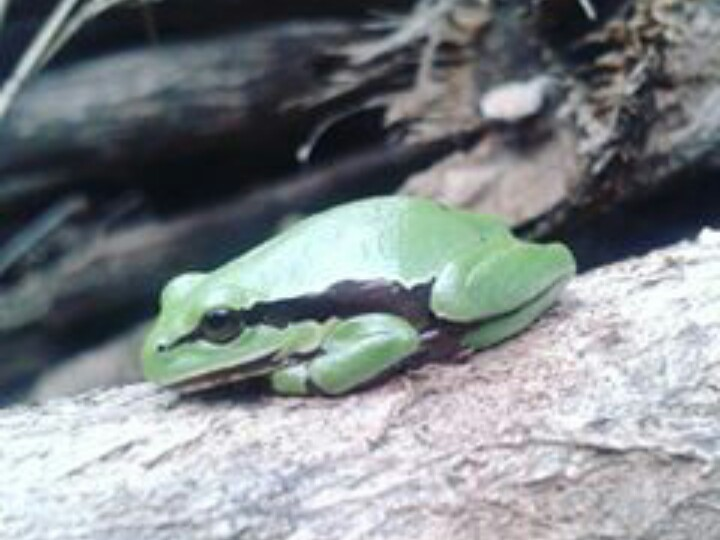

Conservation status
- Least Concern (IUCN 3.1)

Scientific classification
- Kingdom: Animalia
- Phylum: Chordata
- Class: Amphibia
- Order: Anura
- Family: Hylidae
- Genus: Dryophytes
- Species: D. euphorbiaceus

Binomial name
- Dryophytes euphorbiaceus (Günther, 1858)

Synonyms
- Hyla euphorbiacea Günther, 1858

= Southern highland tree frog =

Species of amphibian

The southern highland tree frog (Dryophytes euphorbiaceus) is a species of frog in the family Hylidae endemic to Mexico. Its natural habitats are subtropical or tropical moist montane forests, subtropical or tropical high-altitude grassland, intermittent rivers, and intermittent freshwater marshes. It is threatened by habitat loss.
