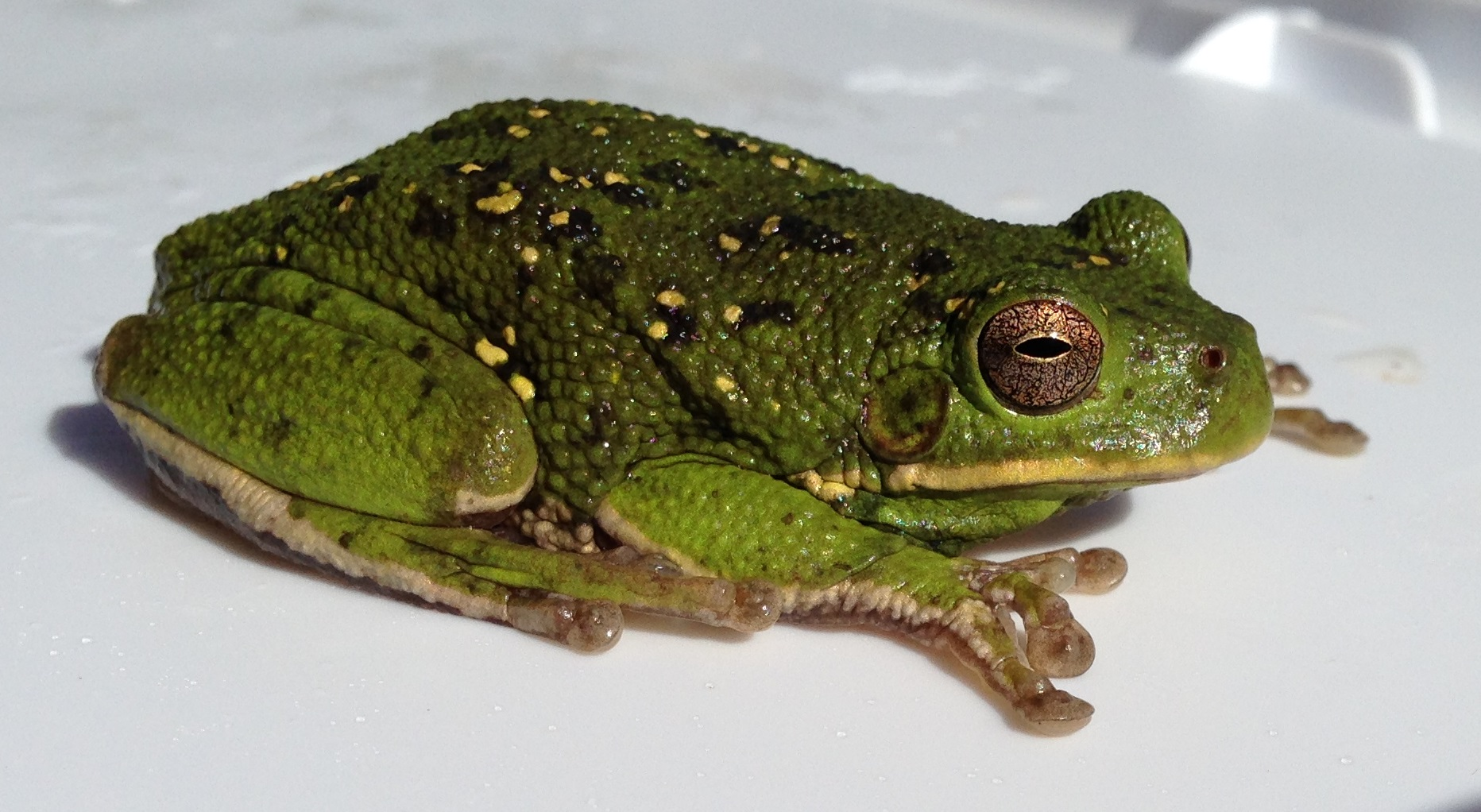

Conservation status
- Least Concern (IUCN 3.1)

- Secure (NatureServe)

Scientific classification
- Kingdom: Animalia
- Phylum: Chordata
- Class: Amphibia
- Order: Anura
- Family: Hylidae
- Genus: Dryophytes
- Species: D. gratiosus

Binomial name
- Dryophytes gratiosus (Le Conte, 1856)

Synonyms
- Hyla gratiosa LeConte, 1856

= Dryophytes gratiosus =

Barking tree frog

Species of amphibian

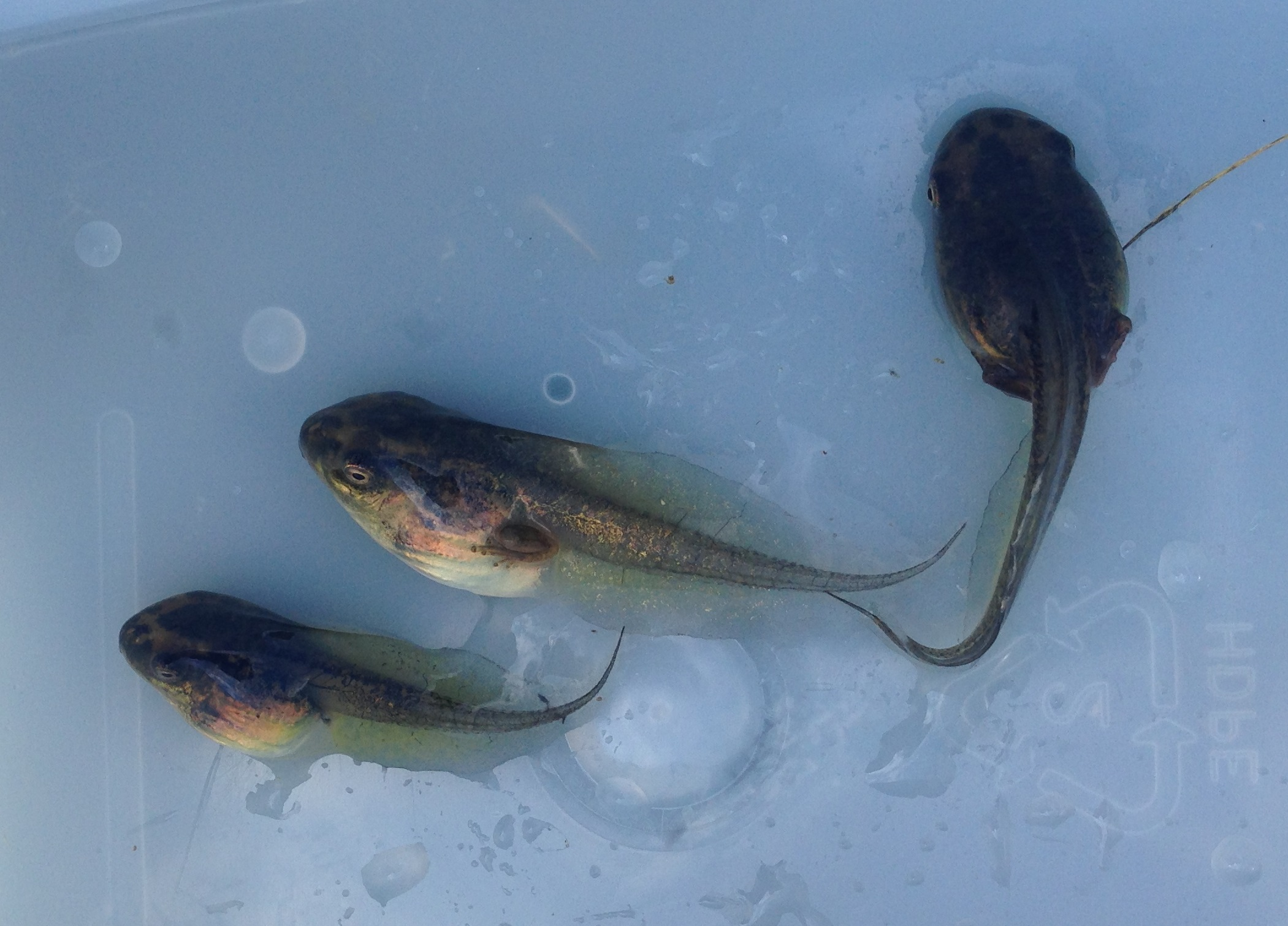
Tadpoles at around 50 days old

Dryophytes gratiosus, commonly known as the barking tree frog, is a species of tree frog endemic to the south-eastern United States. Formerly known as Hyla gratiosa.

== Geographic range ==
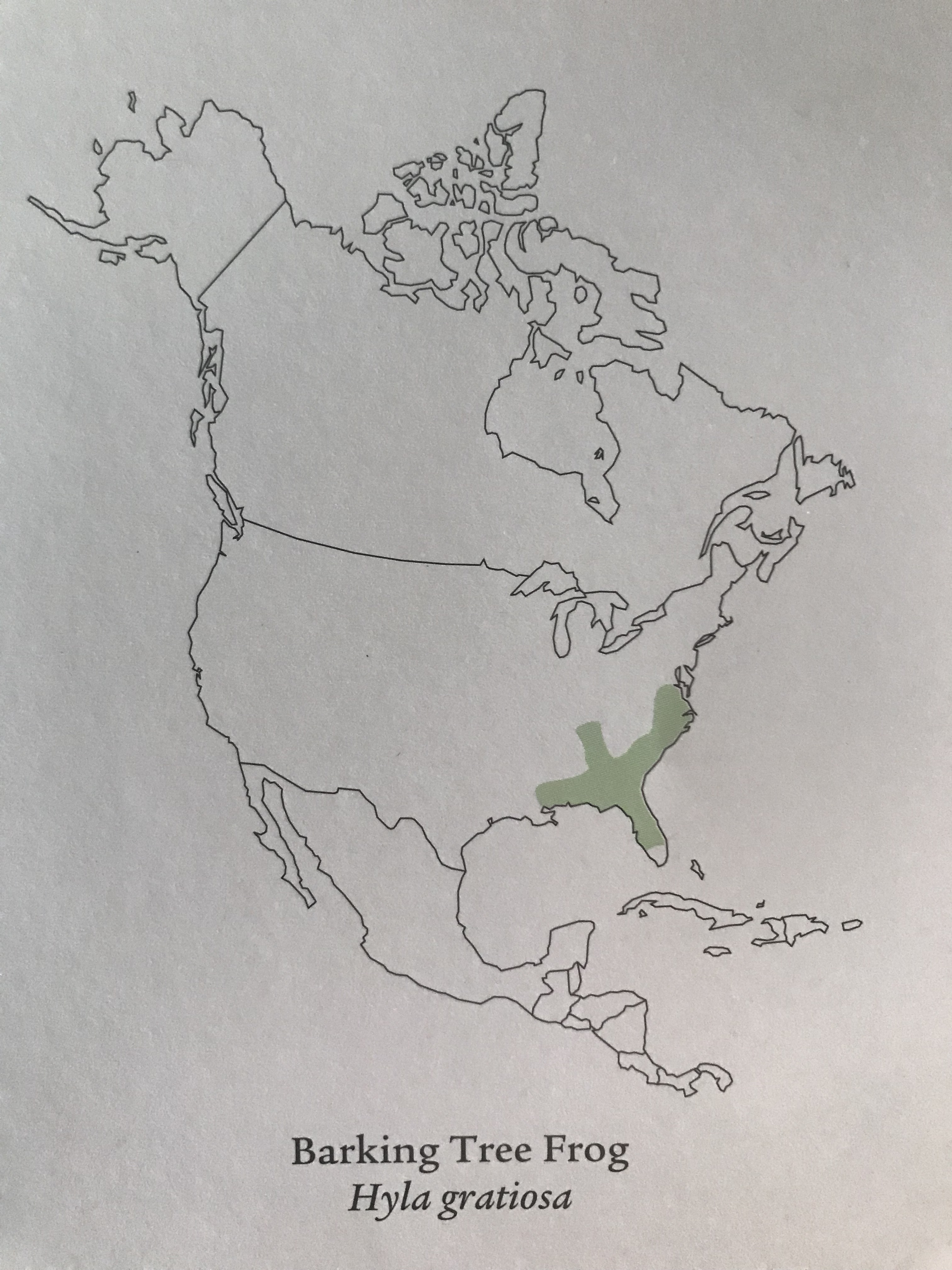

It is found from Delaware to southern Florida and eastern Louisiana, usually in coastal areas. There are also some isolated colonies in Maryland, Kentucky, and Tennessee. A temporary population was found in New Jersey in 1957.

== Description ==
Dryophytes gratiosus is the largest native tree frog in the United States, acquiring its name from the raucous and explosive call. It is 5 to 7 cm (2.0 to 2.8 in) in head-body length. It is variable in color, but easily recognizable due to the characteristic dark, round markings on its dorsum. Individuals may be bright or dull green, brown, yellowish, or gray in color with small, grey and green-yellow spots. It has prominent, round toe pads, and the male has a large vocal sac. Dryophytes gratiosus has skin that is unlike any other species of American frog. Its skin is neither rough and warty nor smooth, having skin that is thick and leathery. Its skin can also shift colors depending on lighting, time of day, temperature, or its surroundings. Changes in color can be rapid and the spots can seem to disappear and reappear over time. The eyes of Dryophytes gratiosus are brown, gold, and black.

== Behavior ==
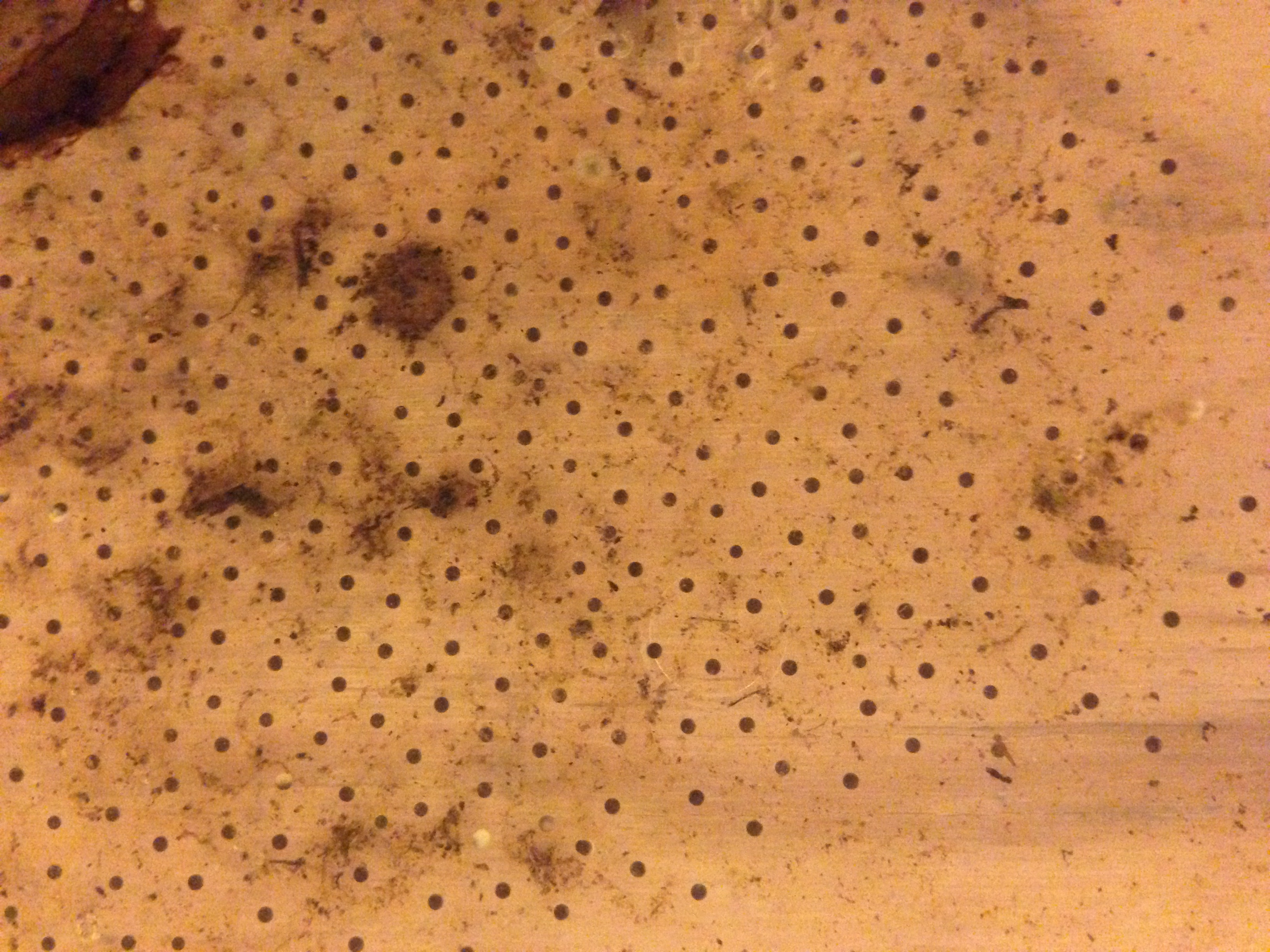
Eggs

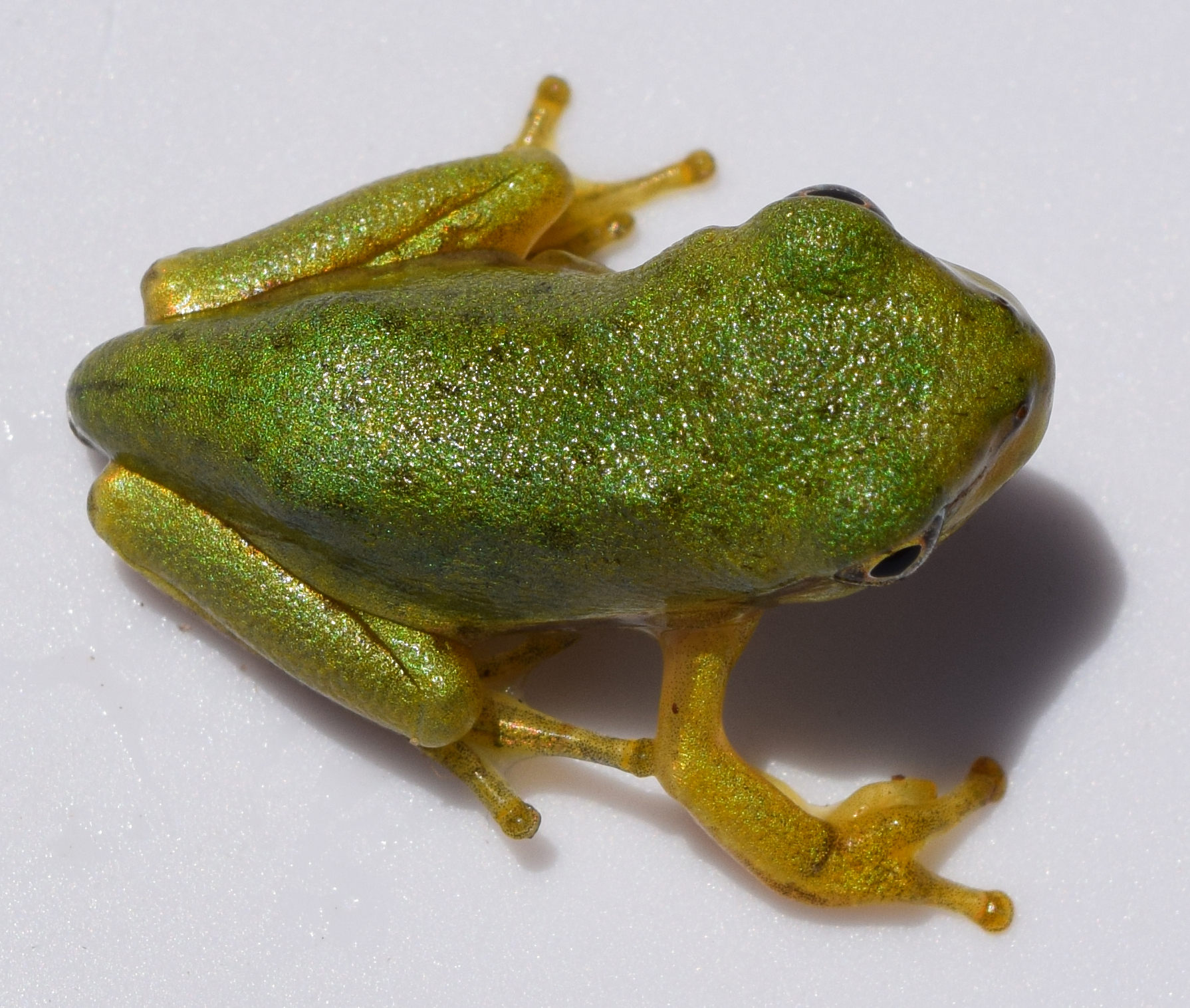
Metamorph

Dryophytes gratiosus males calling

The barking tree frog is known for its loud, strident, barking call. It may also utter a repetitive single-syllable mating call. The calls of the barking tree frog sound like a church bell and have been described as "tonk" and "doonk". It has been known to chorus with other frogs of the same and similar species. Furthermore, during mating, a female D. gratiosus is more likely to pick an attractive mating call unless if it is more than five meters away. Male mating success is positively correlated with chorus attendance however limitations from energy costs reduce the length of time that the males will call in chorus. They slowly become in poorer condition until they either die or leave the pond to replenish their energy requirements.

The barking tree frog burrows in the sand, especially when the temperature is hot. It also spends time high up in trees, especially during the day when it is less active.

== Habitat ==
Adult Dryophytes gratiosus usually live in trees or bushes. They can also burrow deep into mud and logs for added protection from predators. Barking treefrogs need shallow, semi-permanent pools with open canopies or ponds dominated by grasses, which have at least some open water for suitable breeding habitat.

== Movement ==
Male barking tree frogs will move down from the treetops and make their way to a nearby pond in the evenings. This movement is associated with the need to breed, and females soon make their way to the pond as well. After breeding has taken place, barking tree frogs will go back to the forest to occupy the trees. The barking treefrog has the ability to travel long distances if they are not successful in finding a mate in one wetland, but for the most part they stay in the same general area and only really move during the mating season.

== Breeding ==
Dryophytes gratiosus is a polygynous species, the female choosing the male on the basis of his call. They use multiple call characteristics concurrently to select a mate and can be quite choosy. One study researched that for the males to win over a female, the males will arrive at the breeding ponds earlier in the night. The study goes on to present forth the evidence that the males who arrive earlier have a higher probability of mating than the males that arrived late. Females however will generally use call amplitude and frequency to select a mate, as these characteristics correlate to body size. So females do look at the duration as well as call rate when picking a mate, and it isn't just as simple as whoever has the longer call or calls more frequently. Females will choose the right mate with greater amplitude. These females will use triangulation. Triangulation is used to find a male's location by his call, finding others around the male, and to assess the distance between them. Males remain still while calling until the female initiates amplexus by nudging the male. The barking tree frog breeds in a wide variety of shallow wetlands, with adults migrating from arboreal and terrestrial areas to breeding sites. Breeding typically occurs over two or three months, the months differing depending on the location. In Kentucky, Dryophytes gratiosus usually breads between mid June to late July, April to July in North Carolina and Alabama, and March to August in Louisiana and Florida. Most male Dryophytes gratiosus have been reported calling in an inflated condition at the surface of shallow water, usually among aquatic vegetation. After mating, both sexes move inland to higher grasses. Females lay anywhere from 1,500 and 4,000 eggs at a time. When these eggs hatch, grow into tadpoles, or the tailed larva of an amphibian. Tadpoles can be nearly 5 cm (2.0 in) in length.

== Speciation ==
Sometimes people get the Barking Treefrog and the American Green Treefrog confused morphologically as well as acoustically, and one study recorded occasional hybridization with Dryophytes cinereus. Though the two species are genetically compatible enough to mate, the hybrids they produce are at a disadvantage. The hybrids of barking treefrogs and green treefrogs are usually less fit and are not normally chosen by non-hybrid females of either species for mating. A study show that when it came to hybrid tadpoles had low survivorship to Warmouth Sunfish predators but similar survivorship to H. gratiosa tadpoles for aeshnid odonate predators.

== Conservation status ==
Dryophytes gratiosus is listed as least concern on the IUCN Red List.

Through research studies it was learned that agriculture landscapes show the biggest threats to this species and amphibians in general, and juvenile amphibians feel the worst of the effects of the agricultural industry. D. gratiosus is more sensitive to environmental change than other Dryophytes species in its range.
