= List of amphibians of Korea =

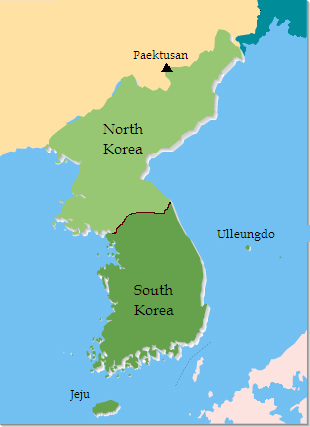
Korean Peninsula and surrounding islands.

This is a list of amphibian species found in the wild in Korea, including the Korean Peninsula and Jeju Island. A total of 20 species of amphibians are known from Korea; this includes two species of salamander that were not discovered until the 21st century.

This list treats the taxonomic designations found in Frost (2007) as authoritative. There have been major revisions of amphibian taxonomy, including the taxonomy of many Korean species, since the late 20th century. This has included studies which have found species such as the Korean brown frog and Imienpo Station frog, which were previously considered to be Korean varieties or subspecies of more widespread species, to be distinct. It has also included a wholesale revision of the taxonomy of the Ranidae, or true frogs—for example, the common dark-spotted frog was formerly classified as Rana nigromaculata but is now classified as Pelophylax nigromaculatus.

The following abbreviations are used in the list:

- I: International status, as given in the IUCN Red List
- K: General status in Korea, as given in various sources
- SK: Legal status in South Korea
- NK: Legal status in North Korea

== Salamanders ==
Common name (Korean name)	Species (Authority)	Preferred habitat	Range	Status
Hynobiidae - 5 species
Korean salamander (도롱뇽)	Hynobius leechii (Boulenger, 1887)	Mountain forests	Throughout mainland	I: Least Concern; SK: Protected
Jeju salamander (제주도롱뇽)	Hynobius quelpaertensis (Mori, 1928)	Montane wetlands	Southwestern islands and peninsulas, including Jeju	I: Data Deficient; SK: Protected
Kori salamander (고리도롱뇽)	Hynobius yangi (Kim, Min, & Matsui, 2003)	Moist mountain forests	Far southeastern South Korea	I: Endangered; SK: Protected
Long-tailed clawed salamander (꼬리치레도롱뇽)	Onychodactylus fischeri (Boulenger, 1886)	High in forested mountain streams	Throughout mainland	I: Least Concern; SK: Threatened, Protected
Siberian salamander (네발가락도롱뇽)	Salamandrella keyserlingii (Dybowski, 1870)	Wet and riparian forests	Northeasternmost North Korea	I: Least Concern; NK: Natural Monument
Plethodontidae - 1 species
Korean crevice salamander (이끼도롱뇽)	Karsenia koreana (Min et al., 2005)	Mossy limestone rockslides in oak-pine forests	Southwestern South Korea	I: Least Concern

== Frogs and toads ==
Common name (Korean name)	Species (Authority)	Preferred habitat	Range	Status
Bombinatoridae - 1 species
Oriental fire-bellied toad (무당개구리)	Bombina orientalis (Boulenger, 1890)	Well-vegetated wetlands	Throughout	I: Least Concern
Bufonidae - 3 species
Asiatic toad (두꺼비)	Bufo gargarizans (Cantor, 1842)	Widespread	Throughout	I: Least Concern; SK: Protected
Korean water toad (물두꺼비)	Bufo stejnegeri (Schmidt, 1931)	Riparian mountain forests	Central Korea	I: Least Concern; K: Rare; SK: Protected
Mongolian toad (작은두꺼비)	Pseudepidalea raddei (Strauch, 1876)	Dry, sandy soil	North Korea	I: Least Concern
Hylidae - 2 species
Japanese treefrog (청개구리)	Hyla japonica (Günther, 1859)	Widespread	Throughout	I: Least Concern
Suwon treefrog (수원청개구리)	Hyla suweonensis (Kuramoto, 1980)	Widespread	West central Korea. Collected along the western coast from Ganghwado to Iksan.	I: Data Deficient; SK: Protected
Microhylidae - 1 species
Boreal digging frog (맹꽁이)	Kaloula borealis (Barbour, 1908)	Near cultivated fields	Throughout	I: Least Concern; SK: Endangered
Ranidae - 8 species
Korean brown frog (한국산개구리)	Rana coreana (Okada, 1928)	Near cultivated fields	Throughout	I: Least Concern; SK: Protected; NK: Natural Monument
Dybowski's frog (산개구리)	Rana dybowskii (Günther, 1876)	Forests	Throughout	I: Least Concern; SK: Protected
Huanren frog (계곡산개구리)	Rana huanrenensis (Fei, Ye & Huang, 1991)	High mountain streams	Sporadic throughout mainland	I: Least Concern; SK: Protected
Dark-spotted frog (참개구리)	Pelophylax nigromaculatus (Hallowell, 1861)	Stagnant water in forests and meadows	Throughout	I: Near Threatened
Seoul frog (금개구리)	Pelophylax chosenicus (Okada, 1931)	Ponds and rice paddies	Western Korea	I: Vulnerable; SK: Endangered
Imienpo Station frog (옴개구리)	Glandirana emeljanovi (Nikolskii, 1913)	Slow streams and wetlands	Throughout mainland	I: Least Concern
American bullfrog (황소개구리)	Rana catesbeiana Shaw, 1802	Stagnant waters	Throughout	I: Least Concern; K: Invasive

== See also ==
- List of mammals of Korea
- List of reptiles of Korea
- List of freshwater fish of Korea
