= Protected species of South Korea =

Under South Korean law, the hunting and capturing of a large number of species of wild animals is prohibited. These include 64 species of mammals, 396 species of birds, 16 species of reptiles, and 10 species of amphibians. Most of these species are not actually endangered species, but are protected for other reasons. No freshwater fish are included on the list, although some are endangered.

These species are defined in Appendix 6 of the Enforcement Regulation of the Protection of Wild Fauna and Flora Act, Ministry of Environment Ordinance #183, amended September 27, 2005.

== Mammals ==
=== Chiroptera ===
- Rhinolophus ferrumequinum
- Eptesicus kobayashii
- Eptesicus nilssoni
- Eptesicus serotinus
- Miniopterus fuscus
- Miniopterus schreibersi
- Murina aurata
- Murina leucogaster
- Myotis daubentoni
- Myotis frater
- Myotis ikonnikovi
- Myotis macrodactylus
- Myotis mystacinus
- Myotis nattereri
- Nyctalus aviator
- Nyctalus noctula
- Pipistrellus abramus
- Pipistrellus savii
- Vespertilio murinus
- Vespertilio orientalis
- Vespertilio superans
- Tadarida teniotis

=== Insectivora ===
- Erinaceus amurensis
- Crocidura dsinezumi
- Crocidura lasiura
- Crocidura russula
- Crocidura sauveolens
- Neomys fodiens
- Sorex araneus
- Sorex caecutiens
- Sorex gracillimus
- Sorex minutissimus
- Sorex mirabilis
- Sorex unguiculatus
- Mogera robusta
- Mogera wogura

=== Lagomorpha ===
- Lepus coreanus
- Lepus manschuricus
- Ochotona hyperborea

=== Rodentia ===
- Petaurista leucogenys
- Sciurus vulgaris
- Tamias sibiricus
- Apodemus agrarius
- Clethrionomys rufocanus
- Clethrionomys rutilus
- Cricetulus barabensis
- Micromys minutus
- Microtus fortis
- Microtus mandarinus
- Ondatra zibethicus
- Tscherskia triton
- Sicista caudata

=== Carnivora ===
- Cuon alpinus
- Nyctereutes procyonoides
- Ursus arctos
- Martes melampus
- Martes zibellina
- Meles meles
- Mustela sibirica

=== Artiodactyla ===
- Sus scrofa
- Capreolus capreolus
- Cervus elaphus
- Hydropotes inermis

== Birds ==
=== Gaviiformes ===
- Gavia adamsii
- Gavia arctica
- Gavia pacifica
- Gavia stellata

=== Podicipediformes ===
- Podiceps auritus
- Podiceps cristatus
- Podiceps grisegena
- Podiceps nigricollis
- Podiceps ruficollis

=== Procellariiformes ===
- Diomedea albatrus
- Calonectris leucoelas
- Pterodroma hypoleuca
- Puffinus carneipes
- Puffinus tenuirostris
- Oceanodroma monorhis

=== Pelecaniformes ===
- Pelecanus philippensis
- Sula dactylatra
- Sula leucogaster
- Fregata ariel
- Phalacrocorax carbo
- Phalacrocorax filamentosus
- Urile pelagicus
- Urile urile
- Platalea minor

=== Ciconiiformes ===
- Ardea cinerea
- Ardea purpurea
- Ardeola bacchus
- Botaurus stellaris
- Bubulcus ibis
- Butorides striatus
- Egretta alba alba
- Egretta alba modesta
- Egretta garzetta
- Egretta intermedia
- Egretta sacra
- Ixobrychus cinnamomeus
- Ixobrychus flavicollis
- Ixobrychus sinensis
- Nycticorax nycticorax
- Nipponia nippon
- Threskiornis melanocephalus

=== Anseriformes ===
- Aix galericulata
- Anas acuta
- Anas americana
- Anas carolinensis
- Anas clypeata
- Anas crecca
- Anas falcata
- Anas penelope
- Anas platyrhynchos
- Anas poecilorhyncha
- Anas querquedula
- Anas rubripes
- Anas strepera
- Anser albifrons
- Anser anser
- Anser caerulescens
- Anser canagicus
- Aythya americana
- Aythya ferina
- Aythya fuligula
- Aythya marila
- Aythya valisineria
- Branta canadensis
- Bucephala clangula
- Bucephala islandica
- Clangula hyemalis
- Histrionicus histrionicus
- Melanitta fusca
- Melanitta nigra
- Mergus albellus
- Mergus merganser
- Mergus serrator
- Netta rufina
- Tadorna cristata
- Tadorna ferruginea
- Tadorna tadorna

=== Falconiformes ===
- Accipiter nisus
- Accipiter soloensis
- Aquila nipalensis
- Butastur indicus
- Gypaetus barbatus
- Spilornis cheela
- Spizaetus nipalensis
- Falco cherrug
- Falco tinnunculus

=== Galliformes ===
- Coturnix japonica
- Phasianus colchicus
- Tetrastes bonasia
- Tetrao tetrix
- Turnix tanki

=== Gruiformes ===
- Grus canadensis
- Grus virgo
- Amaurornis phoenicurus
- Fulica atra
- Gallinula chloropus
- Porzana exquisita
- Porzana fusca
- Porzana paykullii
- Porzana pusilla
- Rallus aquaticus

=== Charadriiformes ===
- Hydrophasianus chirurgus
- Charadrius alexandrinus
- Charadrius dubius
- Charadrius leschenaultii
- Charadrius mongolus
- Charadrius veredus
- Microsarcops cinereus
- Pluvialis fulva
- Pluvialis squatarola
- Vanellus vanellus
- Arenaria interpres
- Calidris acuminata
- Calidris alpina
- Calidris canutus
- Calidris ferruginea
- Calidris melanotos
- Calidris minuta
- Calidris minutilla
- Calidris ruficollis
- Calidris temminckii
- Calidris tenuirostris
- Crocethia alba
- Gallinago gallinago
- Gallinago hardwickii
- Gallinago megala
- Gallinago solitaria
- Gallinago stenura
- Limicola falcinellus
- Limnodromus scolopaceus
- Limnodromus semipalmatus
- Limosa lapponica
- Limosa limosa
- Lymnocryptes minimus
- Numenius arquata
- Numenius minutus
- Numenius phaeopus
- Philomachus pugnax
- Scolopax rusticola
- Tringa brevipes
- Tringa erythropus
- Tringa glareola
- Tringa hypoleucos
- Tringa melanoleuca
- Tringa nebularia
- Tringa ochropus
- Tringa stagnatilis
- Tringa totanus
- Tryngites subruficollis
- Xenus cinereus
- Himantopus himantopus
- Recurvirostra avocetta
- Phalaropus fulicarius
- Phalaropus lobatus
- Phalaropus tricolor
- Rostratula benghalensis
- Glareola maldivarum
- Larus argentatus
- Larus cachinans
- Larus canus
- Larus crassirostris
- Larus genei
- Larus glaucescens
- Larus glaucoides
- Larus heuglini
- Larus hyperboreus
- Larus ridibundus
- Larus sabini
- Larus schistisagus
- Larus tridactyla
- Pagophila eburnea
- Rhodostethia rosea
- Sterna albifrons
- Sterna caspia
- Sterna fuscata
- Sterna hirundo
- Sterna leucoptera
- Sterna nigra
- Thalasseus bergii
- Stercorarius parasiticus
- Aethia pusilla
- Brachyramphus marmoratus
- Cepphus carbo
- Cerorhinca monocerata
- Synthliboramphus antiquus
- Uria aalge

=== Columbiformes ===
- Columba janthina
- Columba oenas
- Columba rupestris
- Streptopelia decaocto
- Streptopelia orientalis
- Streptopelia tranquebarica
- Treron sieboldii
- Syrrhaptes paradoxus

=== Cuculiformes ===
- Clamator coromandus
- Cuculus canorus
- Cuculus fugax
- Cuculus micropterus
- Cuculus poliocephalus
- Cuculus saturatus

=== Strigiformes ===
- Asio flammeus
- Asio otus
- Athene noctua
- Ninox scutulata
- Nyctea scandiaca
- Otus bakkamoena
- Otus scops
- Surnia ulula

=== Caprimulgiformes ===
- Caprimulgus indicus

=== Apodiformes ===
- Apus affinus
- Apus pacificus
- Chaetura caudacuta

=== Coraciiformes ===
- Alcedo atthis
- Ceryle lugubris
- Halcyon coromanda
- Halcyon pileata
- Eurystomus orientalis
- Upupa epops

=== Piciformes ===
- Dendrocopos canicapillus
- Dendrocopos kizuki
- Dendrocopos leucotos
- Dendrocopos hyperethrys
- Dendrocopos major
- Dendrocopos minor
- Jynx torquilla
- Picoides tridactylus
- Picus canus

=== Passeriformes ===
- Delichon urbica
- Hirundo daurica
- Hirundo rustica
- Riparia riparia
- Alauda arvensis
- Calandrella brachydactyla
- Calandrella rufescens
- Anthus cervinus
- Anthus gustavi
- Anthus roseatus
- Anthus spinoletta
- Anthus godlewskii
- Anthus hodgsoni
- Anthus novaeseelandiae
- Dendronanthus indicus
- Motacilla alba leucopsis
- Motacilla alba lugens
- Motacilla alba ocularis
- Motacilla cinerea
- Motacilla citreola
- Motacilla flava
- Motacilla grandis
- Hypsipetes amaurotis
- Lanius bucephalus
- Lanius cristatus
- Lanius excubitor
- Lanius schach
- Lanius sphenocercus
- Lanius tigrinus
- Coracina melaschistos
- Pericrocotus divaricatus
- Bombycilla garrulus
- Bombycilla japonica
- Cinclus pallasii
- Troglodytes troglodytes
- Prunella collaris
- Prunella montanella
- Acrocephalus aedon
- Acrocephalus arundinaceus
- Acrocephalus bistrigiceps
- Cettia diphone
- Cettia squameiceps
- Cisticola juncidis
- Cyanoptila cyanomelana
- Erithacus akahige
- Erithacus calliope
- Erithacus cyane
- Erithacus sibilans
- Erithacus svecicus
- Eumyias thalassina
- Ficedula mugimaki
- Ficedula narcissina
- Ficedula parva
- Ficedula zanthopygia
- Helopsaltes certhiola
- Helopsaltes fasciolatus
- Helopsaltes ochotensis
- Helopsaltes pleskei
- Locustella lanceolata
- Megalurus pryeri
- Monticola gularis
- Monticola solitarius
- Muscicapa griseisticta
- Muscicapa latirostris
- Muscicapa sibirica
- Oenanthe hispanica
- Oenanthe pleschanka
- Phoenicurus auroreus
- Phoenicurus ochruros
- Phylloscopus borealis
- Phylloscopus fuscatus
- Phylloscopus inornatus
- Phylloscopus occipitalis
- Phylloscopus proregulus
- Phylloscopus schwarzi
- Phylloscopus tenellipes
- Phylloscopus trochiloides
- Regulus regulus
- Rhopophilus pekinensis
- Saxicola ferrea
- Saxico lamaurus
- Sylvia curruca
- Tarsiger cyanurus
- Turdus cardis
- Turdus chrysolaus
- Turdus dauma
- Turdus hortulorum
- Turdus merula
- Turdus naumanni eunomus
- Turdus naumanni naumanni
- Turdus pallidus
- Turdus ruficollis
- Turdus sibiricus
- Panurus biarmicus
- Paradoxornis webbiana
- Tersiphone paradisi
- Parus ater
- Parus major
- Parus montanus
- Parus palustris
- Parus varius
- Aegithalos caudatus
- Remiz pendulinus
- Sitta europaea
- Sitta villosa
- Certhia familiaris
- Zosterops erythropleura
- Zosterops japonica
- Calcarius lapponicus
- Emberiza aureola
- Emberiza bruniceps
- Emberiza chrysophrys
- Emberiza cioides
- Emberiza elegans
- Emberiza fucata
- Emberiza jankowskii
- Emberiza leucocephala
- Emberiza pusilla
- Emberiza rustica
- Emberiza rutila
- Emberiza schoeniclus
- Emberiza spodocephala
- Emberiza sulphurata
- Emberiza tristrami
- Emberiza variabilis
- Emberiza yessoensis
- Plectrophenax nivalis
- Carduelis flammea
- Carduelis hornemanni
- Carduelis sinica
- Carduelis spinus
- Carpodacus erythrinus
- Carpodacus roseus
- Coccothraustes coccothraustes
- Eophona migratoria
- Eophona personata
- Fringilla montifringilla
- Leucosticte arctoa
- Loxia curvirostra
- Loxia leucoptera
- Pinicola enucleator
- Pyrrhula pyrrhula
- Carpodacus sibiricus
- Sturnus cineraceus
- Sturnus philippensis
- Sturnus sinensis
- Sturnus sturninus
- Sturnus vulgaris
- Passer montanus
- Passer rutilans
- Oriolus chinensis
- Dicrurus hottentottus
- Dicrurus leucophaeus
- Dicrurus macrocercus
- Artamus leucorhynchus
- Corvus corone
- Corvus frugilegus
- Corvus macrorhynchos
- Corvus monedula
- Cyanopica cyana
- Garrulus glandarius
- Nucifraga caryocatactes
- Pica pica
- Pyrrhocorax pyrrhocorax

== Reptiles ==
=== Testudines ===
- Dermochelys coriacea schlegelii
- Chelonia mydas japonica
- Pelodiscus sinensis
- Scinella laterale laterale
- Takydromus wolteri

=== Squamata ===
- Elaphe dione
- Elaphe rufodorsata
- Rhabdophis tigrinus tigrinus
- Zamenis spinalis Peters
- Dinodon rufozonatus rufozonatus
- Amphiesma vibakari ruthveni
- Gloydius ussuriensis
- Gloydius brevicauda
- Agkistrodon saxatilis
- Hydrophis melanocephalus
- Pelamis platurus

== Amphibians ==
=== Caudata ===
- Hynobius leechii
- Hynobius quelpaertensis
- Hynobius yangi
- Onychodactylus fischeri

=== Anura ===
- Bufo gargarizans
- Bufo stejnegeri
- Hyla suweonensis
- Rana amurensis
- Rana dybowskii
- Rana huanrenensis

== See also ==
- Natural monuments of South Korea
