= Environmental degradation =

Deleterious or undesirable change to the environment

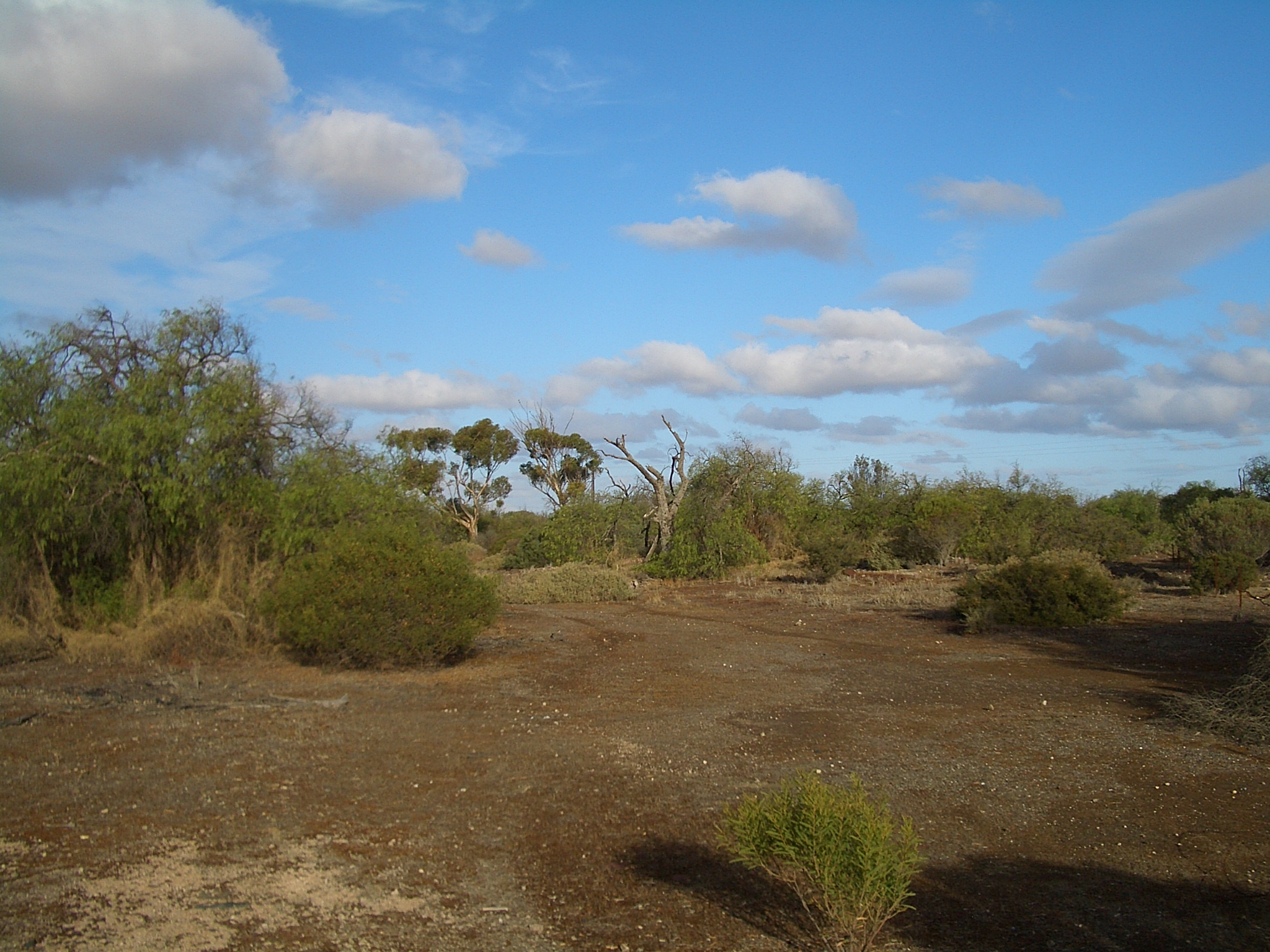
More than eighty years after the abandonment of Wallaroo Mines (Kadina, South Australia), mosses remain the only vegetation in some areas of the site's grounds.

Environmental degradation is the deterioration of the environment through depletion of resources such as quality of air, water and soil; the destruction of ecosystems; habitat destruction; the extinction of wildlife; and pollution. It is defined as any change or disturbance to the environment perceived to be deleterious or undesirable. The environmental degradation process amplifies the impact of environmental issues which leave lasting impacts on the environment.

Environmental degradation is one of the ten threats officially cautioned by the High-level Panel on Threats, Challenges and Change of the United Nations. The United Nations International Strategy for Disaster Reduction defines environmental degradation as "the reduction of the capacity of the environment to meet social and ecological objectives, and needs".

Environmental degradation comes in many types. When natural habitats are destroyed or natural resources are depleted, the environment is degraded; direct environmental degradation, such as deforestation, which is readily visible; this can be caused by more indirect process, such as the build up of plastic pollution over time or the buildup of greenhouse gases that causes tipping points in the climate system. Efforts to counteract this problem include environmental protection and environmental resources management. Mismanagement that leads to degradation can also lead to environmental conflict where communities organize in opposition to the forces that mismanaged the environment.

== Biodiversity loss ==
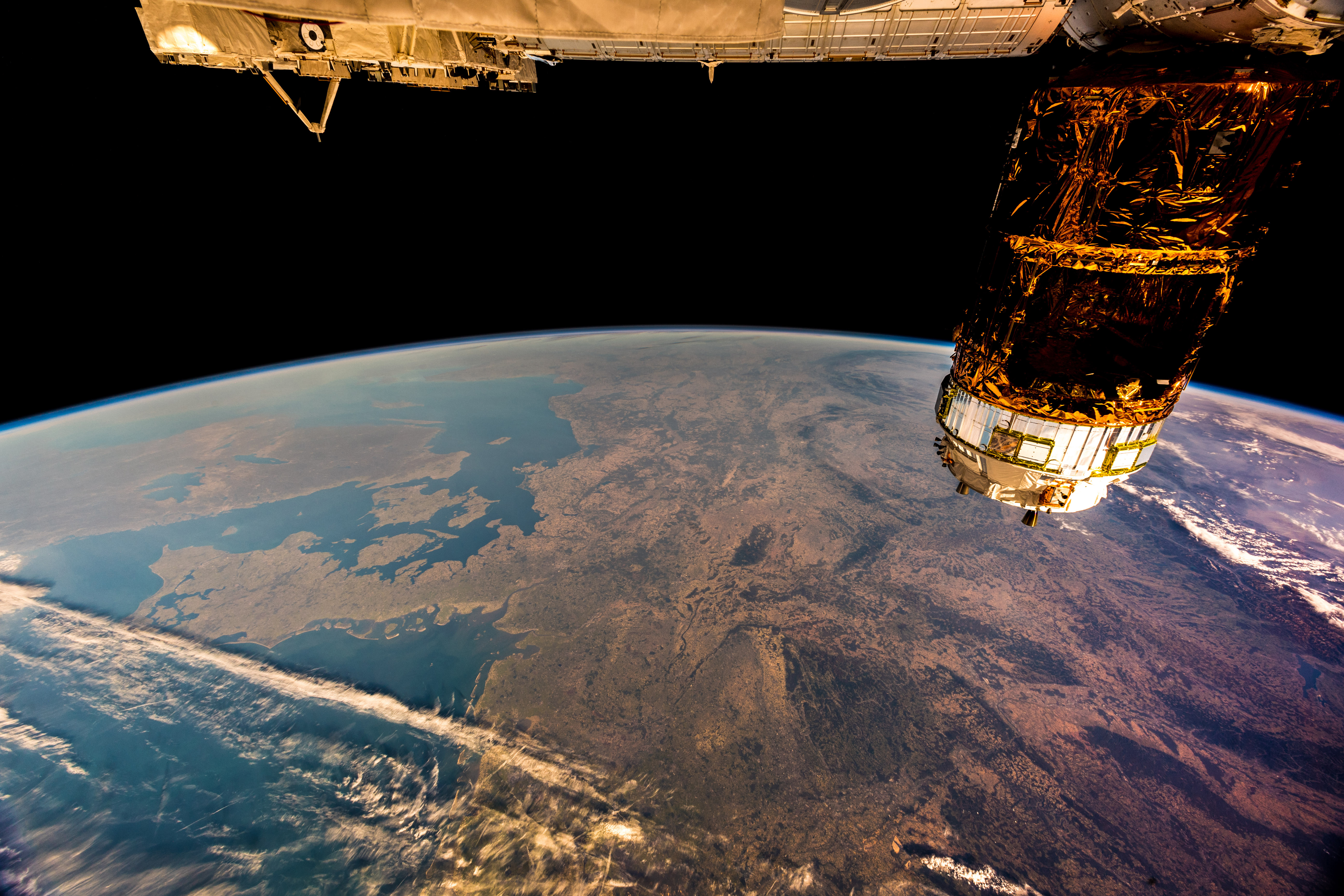
Deforestation in Europe, 2018. Almost all of Europe's original forests have been destroyed.

Scientists assert that human activity has pushed the earth into a sixth mass extinction event. The loss of biodiversity has been attributed in particular to human overpopulation, continued human population growth and overconsumption of natural resources by the world's wealthy. A 2020 report by the World Wildlife Fund found that human activity – specifically overconsumption, population growth and intensive farming – has destroyed 68% of vertebrate wildlife since 1970. The Global Assessment Report on Biodiversity and Ecosystem Services, published by the United Nations' IPBES in 2019, posits that roughly one million species of plants and animals face extinction from anthropogenic causes, such as expanding human land use for industrial agriculture and livestock rearing, along with overfishing.

Since the establishment of agriculture over 11,000 years ago, humans have altered roughly 70% of the Earth's land surface, with the global biomass of vegetation being reduced by half, and terrestrial animal communities seeing a decline in biodiversity greater than 20% on average. A 2021 study says that just 3% of the planet's terrestrial surface is ecologically and faunally intact, meaning areas with healthy populations of native animal species and little to no human footprint. Many of these intact ecosystems were in areas inhabited by indigenous peoples. With 3.2 billion people affected globally, degradation affects over 30% of the world's land area and 40% of land in developing countries.

The implications of these losses for human livelihoods and wellbeing have raised serious concerns. With regard to the agriculture sector for example, The State of the World's Biodiversity for Food and Agriculture, published by the Food and Agriculture Organization of the United Nations in 2019, states that "countries report that many species that contribute to vital ecosystem services, including pollinators, the natural enemies of pests, soil organisms and wild food species, are in decline as a consequence of the destruction and degradation of habitats, overexploitation, pollution and other threats" and that "key ecosystems that deliver numerous services essential to food and agriculture, including supply of freshwater, protection against hazards and provision of habitat for species such as fish and pollinators, are declining."

=== Impacts of environmental degradation on women's livelihoods ===
On the way biodiversity loss and ecosystem degradation impact livelihoods, the Food and Agriculture Organization of the United Nations finds also that in contexts of degraded lands and ecosystems in rural areas, both girls and women bear heavier workloads.

Women's livelihoods, health, food and nutrition security, access to water and energy, and coping abilities are all disproportionately affected by environmental degradation. Environmental pressures and shocks, particularly in rural areas, force women to deal with the aftermath, greatly increasing their load of unpaid care work. Also, as limited natural resources grow even scarcer due to climate change, women and girls must also walk further to collect food, water or firewood, which heightens their risk of being subjected to gender-based violence.

This implies, for example, longer journeys to get primary necessities and greater exposure to the risks of human trafficking, rape, and sexual violence.

== Water degradation ==
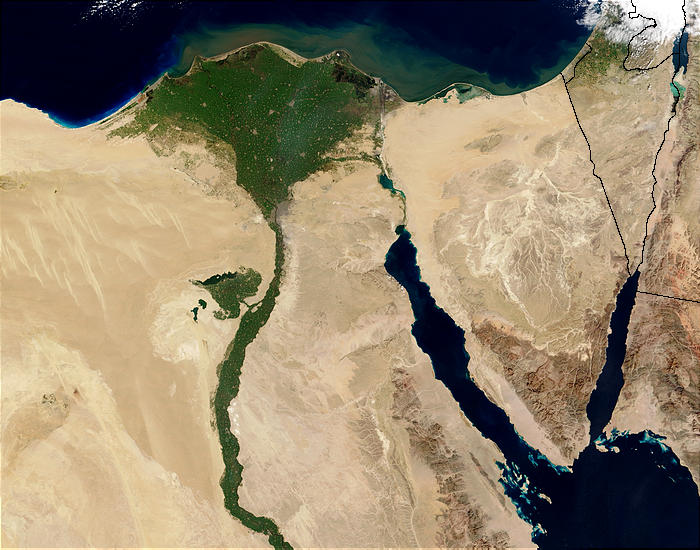
Ethiopia's move to fill the Grand Ethiopian Renaissance Dam's reservoir could reduce Nile flows by as much as 25% and devastate Egyptian farmlands.

One major component of environmental degradation is the depletion of the resource of fresh water on Earth. Approximately only 2.5% of all of the water on Earth is fresh water, with the rest being salt water. 69% of fresh water is frozen in ice caps located on Antarctica and Greenland, so only 30% of the 2.5% of fresh water is available for consumption. Fresh water is an exceptionally important resource, since life on Earth is ultimately dependent on it. Water transports nutrients, minerals and chemicals within the biosphere to all forms of life, sustains both plants and animals, and moulds the surface of the Earth with transportation and deposition of materials.

The current top three uses of fresh water account for 95% of its consumption; approximately 85% is used for irrigation of farmland, golf courses, and parks, 6% is used for domestic purposes such as indoor bathing uses and outdoor garden and lawn use, and 4% is used for industrial purposes such as processing, washing, and cooling in manufacturing centres. It is estimated that one in three people over the entire globe are already facing water shortages, almost one-fifth of the world population live in areas of physical water scarcity, and almost one quarter of the world's population live in a developing country that lacks the necessary infrastructure to use water from available rivers and aquifers. Water scarcity is an increasing problem due to many foreseen issues in the future including population growth, increased urbanization, higher standards of living, and climate change.

Industrial and domestic sewage, pesticides, fertilizers, plankton blooms, silt, oils, chemical residues, radioactive material, and other pollutants are some of the most frequent water pollutants. These have a huge negative impact on the water and can cause degradation in various levels.

=== Climate change and temperature ===
Climate change affects the Earth's water supply in a large number of ways. It is predicted that the mean global temperature will rise in the coming years due to a number of forces affecting the climate. The amount of atmospheric carbon dioxide (CO_{2}) will rise, and both of these will influence water resources; evaporation depends strongly on temperature and moisture availability which can ultimately affect the amount of water available to replenish groundwater supplies.

Transpiration from plants can be affected by a rise in atmospheric CO_{2}, which can decrease their use of water, but can also raise their use of water from possible increases of leaf area. Temperature rise can reduce the snow season in the winter and increase the intensity of the melting snow leading to peak runoff of this, affecting soil moisture, flood and drought risks, and storage capacities depending on the area.

Warmer winter temperatures cause a decrease in snowpack, which can result in diminished water resources during summer. This is especially important at mid-latitudes and in mountain regions that depend on glacial runoff to replenish their river systems and groundwater supplies, making these areas increasingly vulnerable to water shortages over time; an increase in temperature will initially result in a rapid rise in water melting from glaciers in the summer, followed by a retreat in glaciers and a decrease in the melt and consequently the water supply every year as the size of these glaciers get smaller and smaller.

Thermal expansion of water and increased melting of oceanic glaciers from an increase in temperature gives way to a rise in sea level. This can affect the freshwater supply to coastal areas as well. As river mouths and deltas with higher salinity get pushed further inland, an intrusion of saltwater results in an increase of salinity in reservoirs and aquifers. Sea-level rise may also consequently be caused by a depletion of groundwater, as climate change can affect the hydrologic cycle in a number of ways. Uneven distributions of increased temperatures and increased precipitation around the globe results in water surpluses and deficits, but a global decrease in groundwater suggests a rise in sea level, even after meltwater and thermal expansion were accounted for, which can provide a positive feedback to the problems sea-level rise causes to fresh-water supply.

A rise in air temperature results in a rise in water temperature, which is also very significant in water degradation as the water would become more susceptible to bacterial growth. An increase in water temperature can also affect ecosystems greatly because of a species' sensitivity to temperature, and also by inducing changes in a body of water's self-purification system from decreased amounts of dissolved oxygen in the water due to rises in temperature.

=== Climate change and precipitation ===
A rise in global temperatures is also predicted to correlate with an increase in global precipitation but because of increased runoff, floods, increased rates of soil erosion, and mass movement of land, a decline in water quality is probable, because while water will carry more nutrients it will also carry more contaminants. While most of the attention about climate change is directed towards global warming and greenhouse effect, some of the most severe effects of climate change are likely to be from changes in precipitation, evapotranspiration, runoff, and soil moisture. It is generally expected that, on average, global precipitation will increase, with some areas receiving increases and some decreases.

Climate models show that while some regions should expect an increase in precipitation, such as in the tropics and higher latitudes, other areas are expected to see a decrease, such as in the subtropics. This will ultimately cause a latitudinal variation in water distribution. The areas receiving more precipitation are also expected to receive this increase during their winter and actually become drier during their summer, creating even more of a variation of precipitation distribution. Naturally, the distribution of precipitation across the planet is very uneven, causing constant variations in water availability in respective locations.

Changes in precipitation affect the timing and magnitude of floods and droughts, shift runoff processes, and alter groundwater recharge rates. Vegetation patterns and growth rates will be directly affected by shifts in precipitation amount and distribution, which will in turn affect agriculture as well as natural ecosystems. Decreased precipitation will deprive areas of water causing water tables to fall and reservoirs of wetlands, rivers, and lakes to empty. In addition, a possible increase in evaporation and evapotranspiration will result, depending on the accompanied rise in temperature. Groundwater reserves will be depleted, and the remaining water has a greater chance of being of poor quality from saline or contaminants on the land surface.

Climate change is resulting into a very high rate of land degradation causing enhanced desertification and nutrient deficient soils. The menace of land degradation is increasing by the day and has been characterized as a major global threat. According to Global Assessment of Land Degradation and Improvement (GLADA) a quarter of land area around the globe can now be marked as degraded. Land degradation is supposed to influence lives of 1.5 billion people and 15 billion tons of fertile soil is lost every year due to anthropogenic activities and climate change.

=== Population growth ===
Graph of human population from 10,000 BCE to 2000 CE. It shows sevenfold rise in world population that has taken place since the end of the seventeenth century.

The human population on Earth is expanding rapidly, which together with even more rapid economic growth is the main cause of the degradation of the environment. Humanity's appetite for resources is disrupting the environment's natural equilibrium. Production industries are venting smoke into the atmosphere and discharging chemicals that are polluting water resources. The smoke includes detrimental gases such as carbon monoxide and sulphur dioxide. The high levels of pollution in the atmosphere form layers that are eventually absorbed into the atmosphere. Organic compounds such as chlorofluorocarbons (CFCs) have generated an opening in the ozone layer, which admits higher levels of ultraviolet radiation, putting the globe at risk.

The available fresh water being affected by the climate is also being stretched across an ever-increasing global population. It is estimated that almost a quarter of the global population is living in an area that is using more than 20% of their renewable water supply; water use will rise with population while the water supply is also being aggravated by decreases in streamflow and groundwater caused by climate change. Even though some areas may see an increase in freshwater supply from an uneven distribution of precipitation increase, an increased use of water supply is expected.

An increased population means increased withdrawals from the water supply for domestic, agricultural, and industrial uses, the largest of these being agriculture, believed to be the major non-climate driver of environmental change and water deterioration. The next 50 years will likely be the last period of rapid agricultural expansion, but the larger and wealthier population over this time will demand more agriculture.

Population increase over the last two decades, at least in the United States, has also been accompanied by a shift to an increase in urban areas from rural areas, which concentrates the demand for water into certain areas, and puts stress on the fresh water supply from industrial and human contaminants. Urbanization causes overcrowding and increasingly unsanitary living conditions, especially in developing countries, which in turn exposes an increasingly number of people to disease. About 79% of the world's population is in developing countries, which lack access to sanitary water and sewer systems, giving rises to disease and deaths from contaminated water and increased numbers of disease-carrying insects.

A 2026 study published in Sustainable Development contended that continuing to slow population growth and gradually reduce the human population to 4 billion by 2200 is a path towards sustainability which will help decrease overconsumption of resources, wildlife defaunation, pollution levels and greenhouse gas emissions.

=== Agriculture ===
The rate of global tree cover loss has approximately doubled since 2001, to an annual loss approaching an area the size of Italy.

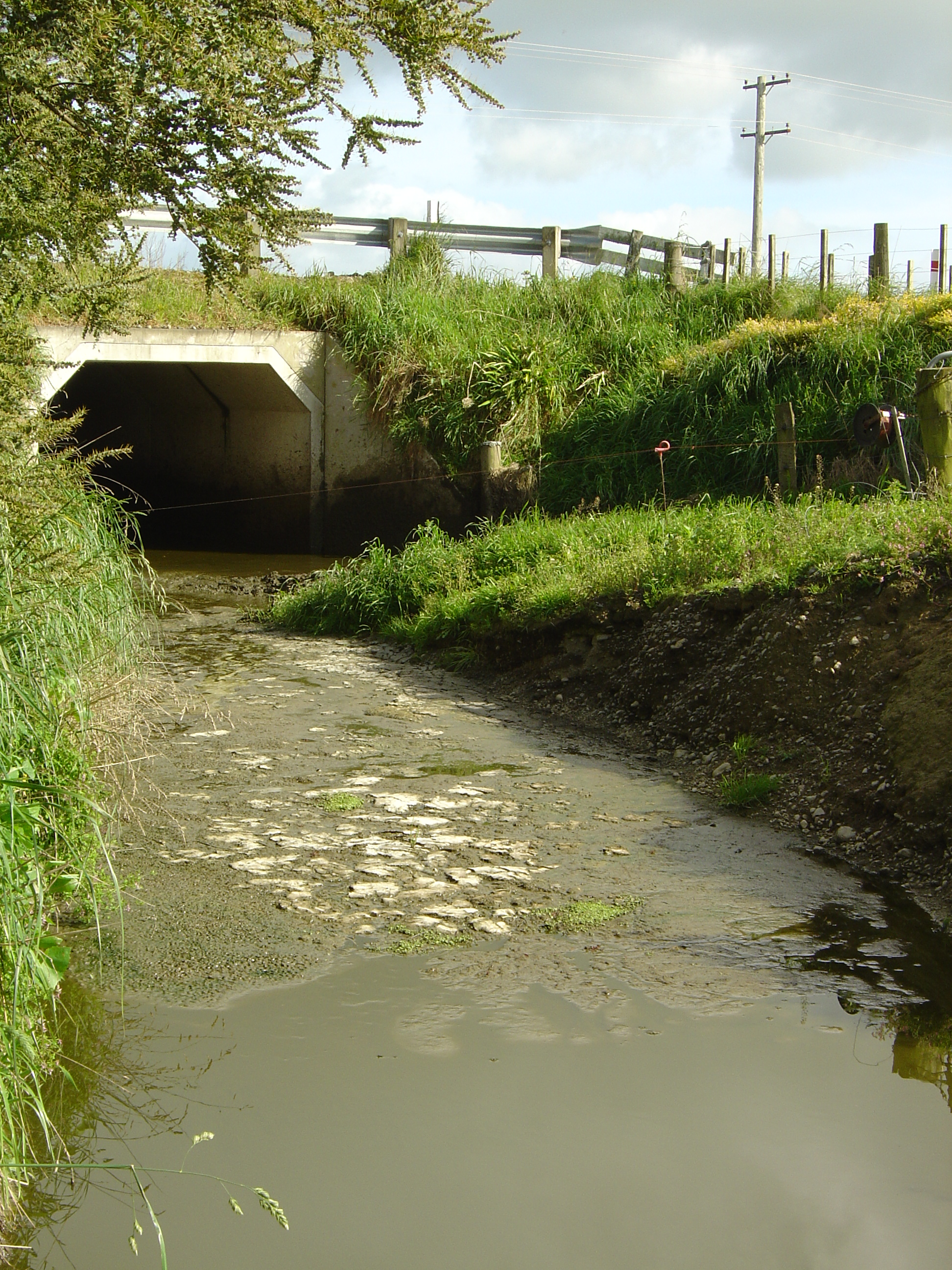
Water pollution due to dairy farming in the Wairarapa, New Zealand.

Agriculture is dependent on available soil moisture, which is directly affected by climate dynamics, with precipitation being the input in this system and various processes being the output, such as evapotranspiration, surface runoff, drainage, and percolation into groundwater. Changes in climate, especially the changes in precipitation and evapotranspiration predicted by climate models, will directly affect soil moisture, surface runoff, and groundwater recharge.

In areas with decreasing precipitation as predicted by the climate models, soil moisture may be substantially reduced. With this in mind, agriculture in most areas already needs irrigation, which depletes fresh water supplies both by the physical use of the water and the degradation agriculture causes to the water. Irrigation increases salt and nutrient content in areas that would not normally be affected, and damages streams and rivers from damming and removal of water. Fertilizer enters both human and livestock waste streams that eventually enter groundwater, while nitrogen, phosphorus, and other chemicals from fertilizer can acidify both soils and water.

Certain agricultural demands may increase more than others with an increasingly wealthier global population, and meat is one commodity expected to double global food demand by 2050, which directly affects the global supply of fresh water. Cows need water to drink, more if the temperature is high and humidity is low, and more if the production system the cow is in is extensive, since finding food takes more effort. Water is needed in the processing of the meat, and also in the production of feed for the livestock. Manure can contaminate bodies of freshwater, and slaughterhouses, depending on how well they are managed, contribute waste such as blood, fat, hair, and other bodily contents to supplies of fresh water.

The transfer of water from agricultural to urban and suburban use raises concerns about agricultural sustainability, rural socioeconomic decline, food security, an increased carbon footprint from imported food, and decreased foreign trade balance. The depletion of fresh water, as applied to more specific and populated areas, increases fresh water scarcity among the population and also makes populations susceptible to economic, social, and political conflict in a number of ways; rising sea levels forces migration from coastal areas to other areas farther inland, pushing populations closer together breaching borders and other geographical patterns, and agricultural surpluses and deficits from the availability of water induce trade problems and economies of certain areas. Climate change is an important cause of involuntary migration and forced displacement. According to the Food and Agriculture Organization of the United Nations, global greenhouse gas emissions from animal agriculture exceeds that of transportation.

=== Water management ===
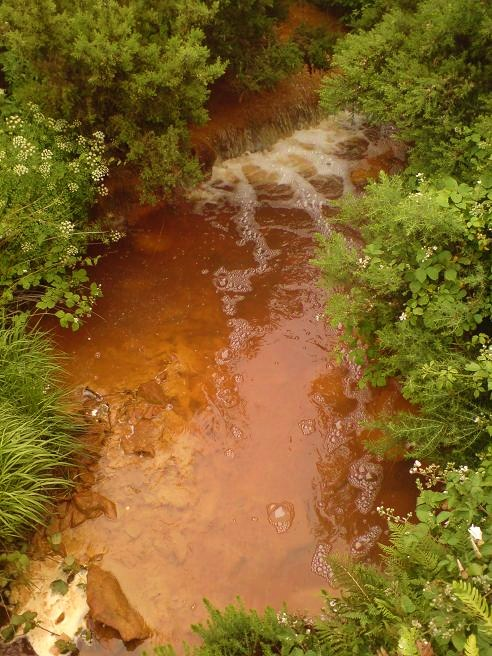
A stream in the town of Amlwch, Anglesey, which is contaminated by acid mine drainage from the former copper mine at the nearby Parys Mountain.

Water management is the process of planning, developing, and managing water resources across all water applications, in terms of both quantity and quality." Water management is supported and guided by institutions, infrastructure, incentives, and information systems.

The issue of the depletion of fresh water has stimulated increased efforts in water management. While water management systems are often flexible, adaptation to new hydrologic conditions may be very costly. Preventative approaches are necessary to avoid high costs of inefficiency and the need for rehabilitation of water supplies, and innovations to decrease overall demand may be important in planning water sustainability.

Water supply systems, as they exist now, were based on the assumptions of the current climate, and built to accommodate existing river flows and flood frequencies. Reservoirs are operated based on past hydrologic records, and irrigation systems on historical temperature, water availability, and crop water requirements; these may not be a reliable guide to the future. Re-examining engineering designs, operations, optimizations, and planning, as well as re-evaluating legal, technical, and economic approaches to manage water resources are very important for the future of water management in response to water degradation. Another approach is water privatization; despite its economic and cultural effects, service quality and overall quality of the water can be more easily controlled and distributed. Rationality and sustainability is appropriate, and requires limits to overexploitation and pollution and efforts in conservation.

== Consumption increases ==
As the world's population increases, it is accompanied by an increase in population demand for natural resources. With the need for more production increases comes more damage to the environments and ecosystems in which those resources are housed. According to the United Nations' population growth predictions, there could be up to 170 million more births by 2070. The need for more fuel, energy, food, buildings, and water sources grows with the number of people on the planet.

However, the scale of environmental degradation is not only determined by population growth but also by consumption patterns and resource efficiency. Industrialized nations, with higher per capita consumption rates, often have a disproportionately large environmental footprint compared to less developed regions. Efforts to adopt sustainable development practices, including renewable energy, recycling, and waste reduction, could mitigate some of the environmental impacts of increased consumption. Furthermore, promoting circular economies and transitioning to low-impact technologies are critical.

=== Deforestation ===
As the need for new agricultural areas and road construction increases, the deforestation processes stay in effect. Deforestation is the "removal of forest or stand of trees from land that is converted to non-forest use." Since the 1960s, nearly 50% of tropical forests have been destroyed, but this process is not limited to tropical forest areas. Europe's forests are also destroyed by livestock, insects, diseases, invasive species, and other human activities. Many of the world's terrestrial biodiversity can be found living in different types of forests. Tearing down these areas for increased consumption directly decreases the world's biodiversity of plant and animal species native to those areas.

Along with destroying habitats and ecosystems, decreasing the world's forest contributes to the amount of CO_{2} in the atmosphere. By taking away forested areas, we are limiting the amount of carbon reservoirs, limiting it to the largest ones: the atmosphere and oceans. While one of the biggest reasons for deforestation is agriculture use for the world's food supply, removing trees from landscapes also increases erosion rates in areas, making it harder to produce crops in those soil types.

== Adaption to degradation ==
Frogs manage the level of salt in their bodies. Though, all frogs will die in salty enough water. The most tolerant frog, the Crab-eating frog, can tolerate up to 75% salinity of seawater, and can live long term in 2/3s salinity of seawater. Many populations of frogs are not adapting fast enough to survive the increase in saline conditions. Many populations of species of frogs are currently adapting to tolerate higher salinity across various environments. The amount of salt that a frog is able to tolerate at a specific time is different from the amount of salt they are able to tolerate long term, and the different life stages usually don't have the same amount of salt tolerance, with embryos the least salt tolerant, and the tadpoles of some frogs the most salt tolerant. Salt can also cause bottlenecks in local populations of frogs, as many frogs die from exposure, reducing genetic diversity, which can exacerbate impacts of disease for the population.

Increasing salinity is driven by human-led freshwater salinization, such as from runoff from icing roadways, from pollutants from agriculture, from mining contaminants, and from the intrusions of seas as sea levels rise. Some frog's adaptation is due to naturally slightly saline ecosystems, such as brackish water in estuaries or mangrove swamps. Some kinds of salt may affect frogs differently than other kinds of salt, but because road salt and saltwater intrusion are the most common kinds of salt exposure, sodium chloride is the most well studied salt with regard to its effects on frogs. The Crab-eating frog, and some of its relatives, are the most well known examples of frogs with high salt tolerance. They are unique among frogs for eating a lot of crabs (when in coastal environments), and appear to be the frogs best able to tolerate salty conditions. The American green tree frog has an ecotype which is better adapted to the salty conditions of the brackish swamps of the Atlantic coasts of the US than their relatives inland in freshwater conditions. The Eurasian green toad, the Natterjack toad, and the cane toad also show salt tolerance. Some populations of the wood frog through exposure to road salts show some adaptations toward salt tolerance. The Spiny toad from Western Europe is more salt tolerant in inland than coastal populations, which is possibly due to inland individuals just being larger from having to burn less energy dealing with salt stress.

Changes in salinity also go hand in hand with other changes to an ecosystem that are harmful to the frogs. The combined effects of heat stress and salt stress on many populations of frogs are worse than either stress acting alone. Additionally, some populations of wood frogs from salty water show worse reflexes and lower activity levels than their freshwater counterparts, which may make them more vulnerable to predation than freshwater frogs. Male wood frogs raised in salty pools also can experience dangerous amounts of edema, or swelling with water, after overwintering. Wood frogs are well studied due to their predictable mass breedings, large numbers, and wide range, as well as the abundance of roads which freeze over next to potential breeding pools.

One important way frogs in general deal with salty conditions is by upregulating the genes for hormones which help transport salt across osmotic membranes, such as angiotensin II and aldosterone (used by Crab-eating frogs), or arginine vasotocin (used by cane toads). In crab eating frogs, these genes have been shown to be expressed in the skin, the kidney, and the bladder, where frogs do most of their water exchange. Another method is to increase production of osmolytes such as glycerol or urea to help absorb more water into their cells to better balance the osmotic pressure. One way some populations of frogs are dealing with salt is simply to produce larger eggs, because larger larvae tolerate salt better. Another is modification of ion transporter in the cell and vacuole walls, to better remove salts from the cells. The proteins which make cells structured also show changes, specifically weakening, to allow the cytoskeleton to be more flexible and better deal with the physical stresses from salt exposure. Experimentally, eggs exposed to salt in wood frogs, lead to frogs and tadpoles which are better adapted to tolerate the salt, when compared to frogs hatched from freshwater-raised eggs.

The mechanisms which frogs use to tolerate salty water are also observed in different species. The Tiger salamander and the Spotted salamander also have some salt tolerance. The adaptations to saltwater seen in frogs are similar to those in fishes moving between salt and freshwater, such as killifish. Glycerol is used as an osmolyte by even yeasts, insects, and plants (see salt tolerance of crops). Urea in higher amounts in the cells of some mammals which have evolved to live in saltwater. Fishes are especially comparable because they share a level of skin permeability with amphibians.

== See also ==
- Anthropocene
- Environmental change
- Environmental issues
- Ecological collapse
- Ecological crisis
- Ecologically sustainable development
- Eco-socialism
- Exploitation of natural resources
- Human impact on the environment
- I=PAT
- Restoration ecology
- United Nations Decade on Biodiversity
- United Nations Development Programme (UNDP)
- United Nations Environment Programme (UNEP)
- World Resources Institute (WRI)

== Sources ==
- This article incorporates text from a free content work. Licensed under CC BY-SA IGO 3.0 (license statement/permission). Text taken from The State of the World's Biodiversity for Food and Agriculture − In Brief, FAO, FAO. Get the Lead Out: The Poisoning Threat From Tainted Hunting ...
