= Crapaud =

French word for toad

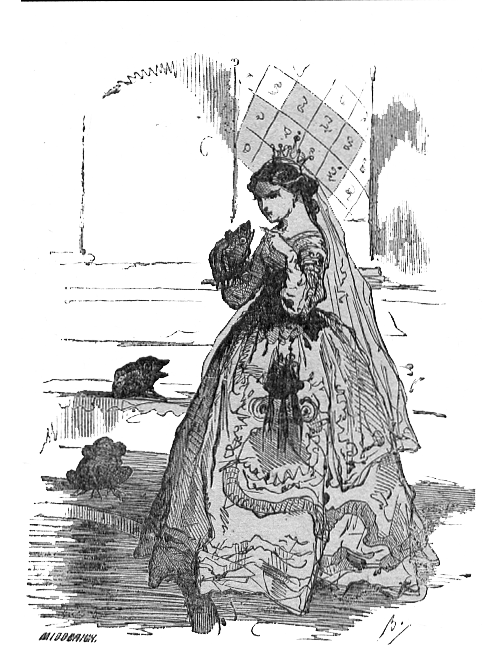
Vignette de Les Cygnes sauvages par Bertall représentant la princesse Élisa et les trois crapauds. (Thumbnail of The Wild Swans by Bertall representing the Princess Eliza and three toads.)

Crapaud is a French word meaning "toad".

== Etymology ==
The word crapaud ultimately is rooted from Frankish *krappō, *krappa, meaning "hook", likely in reference to the toad's hooked feet.

== Heraldry ==
Crapaud is sometimes used as an incorrect reference to the Fleur-de-lys on the ancient heraldic flag of the kings of France. The three fleurs-de-lys were sometimes misinterpreted as "three toads erect, saltant", instead of "three lily flowers".

== In fiction ==
The word crapaud is used extensively by fictional British soldier Richard Sharpe as a derogatory term for the French in Bernard Cornwell's novels set during the Napoleonic Wars.

== Jean Crapaud ==
Jean Crapaud, also Johnny Crappeau or Johnny Crappo, as defined by Webster's Online Dictionary, "is a jocose name given to a Frenchman. It is intended as a national personification of the French people as a whole in much the same sense as John Bull is to the English. It is sometimes used as a literary device to refer to a typical Frenchman, usually in the form of Monsieur Jean Crapaud." The usage of the word "crapaud" in this case is similar to the derogative use of the word "frog", referencing the supposed French affinity for frog legs as a delicacy.

== Jersey Crapaud ==
The name Crapaud is used in the Channel Islands to describe a person from Jersey, the name meaning "toad" in the local Patois languages, including Jèrriais and Guernésiais. Spiny toads live in Jersey but not on the other islands.

== Gallery ==
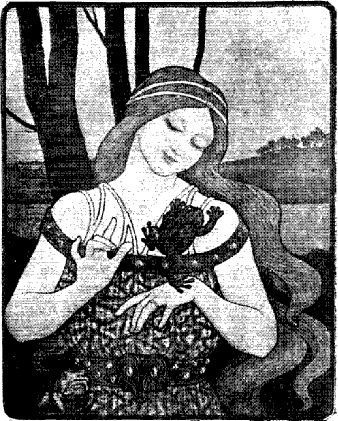
La Femme aux crapauds par Paul Berthon

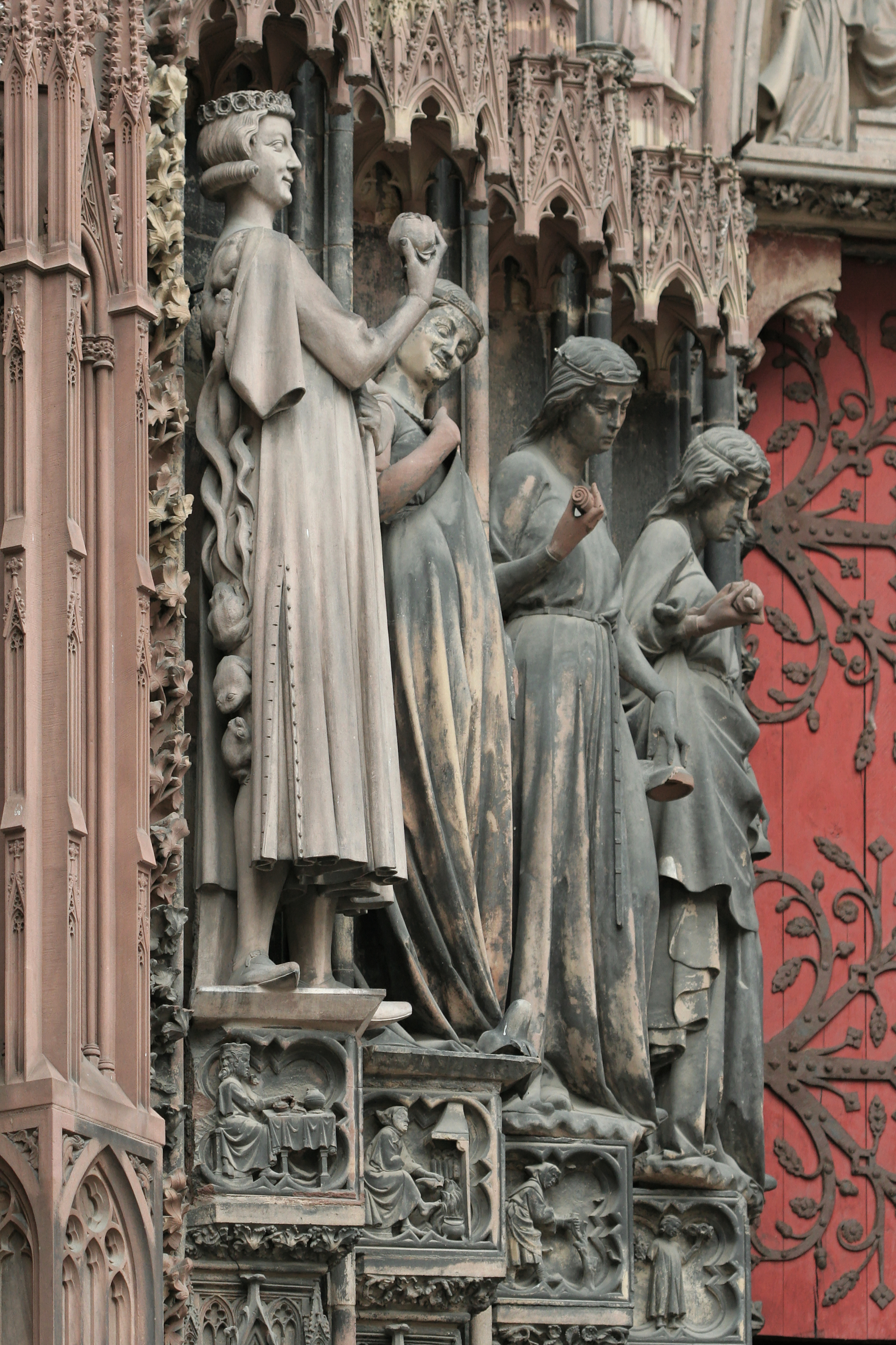
The "tempter" (he holds the forbidden fruit; hidden in his back are toads and reptiles, symbolising corruption) and the foolish virgins (their lamps are overturned, symbolising their emptiness; they hold the scrolls of the law closed, thus remaining ignorant of the Lord's will). A mediaeval interpretation of the Parable of the Ten Virgins from the Gospel of Matthew 25:1–13.

Arms of Pharamond: Sable three golden toads.

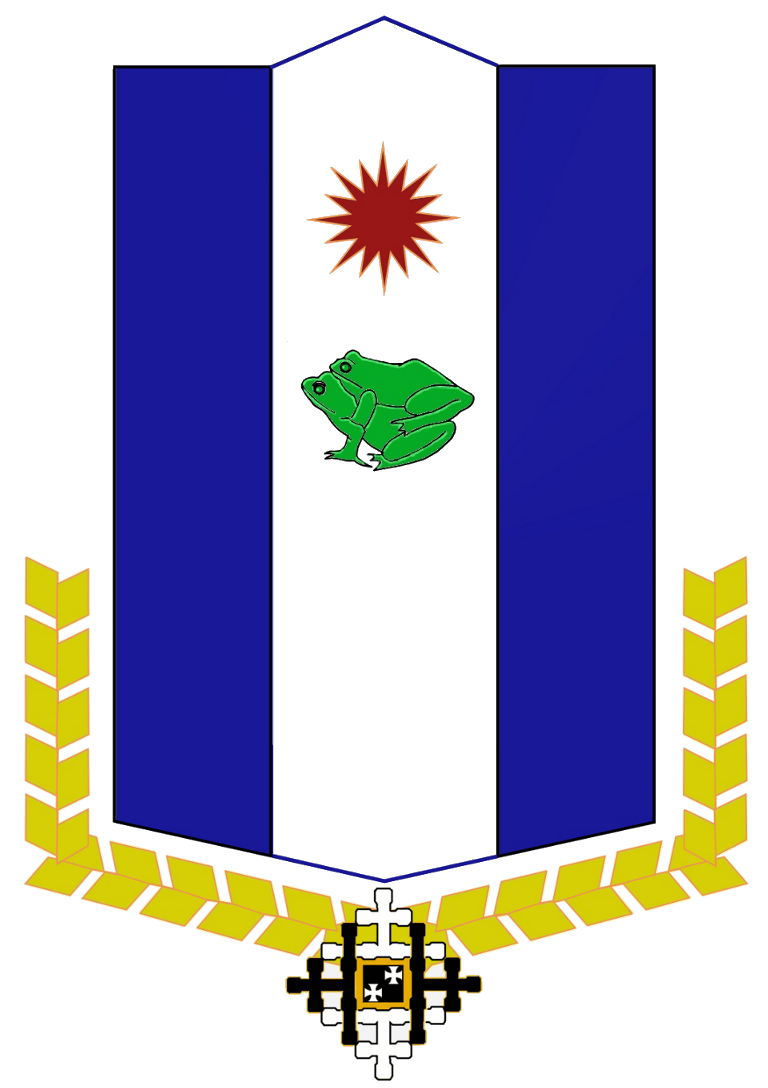
Arms of Gwenael Louis Garaud

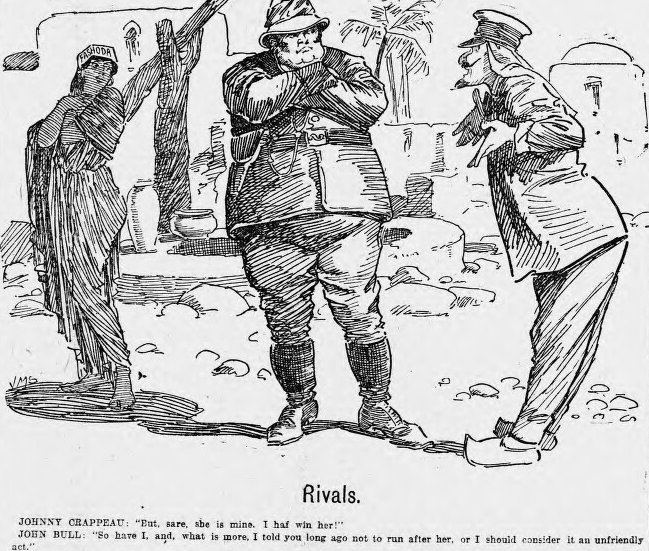
Cartoon showing France in the guise of Johnny Crappeau
