= Water toad =

Water toad is a name used for several species of toads:

- Helmeted water toad (Calyptocephalella gayi)
- Korean water toad (Bufo stejnegeri)
- Surinam water toads (Pipa spp.)
