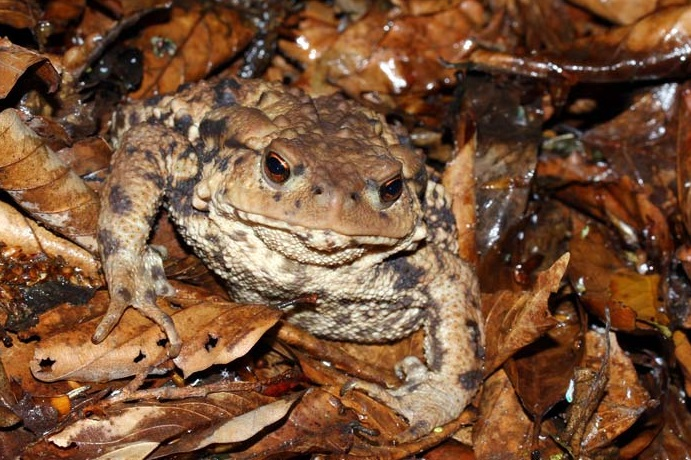

Conservation status
- Vulnerable (IUCN 3.1)

Scientific classification
- Kingdom: Animalia
- Phylum: Chordata
- Class: Amphibia
- Order: Anura
- Family: Bufonidae
- Genus: Bufo
- Species: B. eichwaldi

Binomial name
- Bufo eichwaldi Litvinchuk, Borkin, Skorinov and Rosanov, 2008
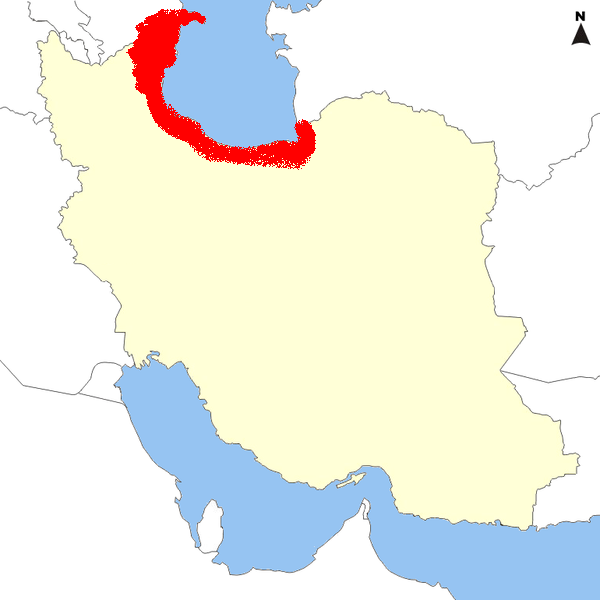
- Distribution of Bufo eichwaldi in south east Azerbaijan and northern Iran (south and south-western of Caspian Sea)

= Bufo eichwaldi =

Species of amphibian

Bufo eichwaldi, commonly known as Eichwald's toad or the Talysh toad, is a species of true toads in the family Bufonidae. It was first described by Litvinchuk, Borkin, Skorinov and Rosanov in 2008 and is found in the Talysh and Elburz Mountains in Azerbaijan and parts of northern Iran. It was previously considered to be a subspecies of the Caucasian toad (Bufo verrucosissimus).

== Description ==
Bufo eichwaldi is a large toad much resembling Bufo verrucosissimus in appearance. It is a uniform dull brownish grey colour and has large round tubercles on its back and smaller ones on its belly. It differs from B. verrucosissimus in that the body has different proportions, the head has an abrupt, unrounded snout and the parotoid gland has black markings where it touches the tympanum. The male has dark spots on its otherwise pale belly and is considerably smaller than the female.

== Distribution and habitat ==
Bufo eichwaldi is believed to occur in south east Azerbaijan and northern Iran in the Talysh and Elburz Mountains. It also occurs in Mazandaran and Gilan provinces in Iran near the Caspian Sea. It lives at heights ranging up to about 1,200 metres (3,900 ft) above sea level. Its habitat is broad-leaved forests but it is also sometimes found in lowland swamps and gardens.

== Biology ==
Nowhere is Bufo eichwaldi abundant or easily seen as it hides during the day, emerging after nightfall to forage for small invertebrates. Breeding takes place in shallow waters at the edge of springs. In Azerbaijan, newly metamorphosed juveniles have been seen in June and July when they are about 12 to 13 millimetres (0.47 to 0.51 in) long.

== Status ==
The IUCN Red List of Threatened Species lists this species as vulnerable. It is believed to have declined by 30% over the last 24 years and has low densities in fragmented populations in a range of about 17,000 square kilometres (6,600 mi^{2}) of mountain territory. It is threatened by habitat loss as the forests in which it lives are being felled for timber.
