= Bufo tuberculatus =

Qinghai Lake toad, Round-warted toad

Conservation status
- Near Threatened (IUCN 3.1)

Scientific classification
- Kingdom: Animalia
- Phylum: Chordata
- Class: Amphibia
- Order: Anura
- Family: Bufonidae
- Genus: Bufo
- Species: B. tuberculatus

Binomial name
- Bufo tuberculatus Zarevskij, 1926

Species of amphibian

Bufo tuberculatus, commonly known as the Qinghai Lake toad or round-warted toad, is a species of toad in the family Bufonidae. It is endemic to southwestern China: western Sichuan, very northern Yunnan, Qinghai (including Qinghai Lake), and the eastern tip of Tibet. It has been treated as a synonym of Bufo tibetanus but is now considered a valid species.

Its natural habitats are pools, marshes and the surrounding habitats in valleys; breeding takes place in pools and ponds. It also occurs in agricultural areas. It is quite common in parts of its range but habitat loss and degradation due to agriculture are threats to it.
