= Oviductin =

Identifiers
- EC no.: 3.4.21.120

Databases
- IntEnz: IntEnz view
- BRENDA: BRENDA entry
- ExPASy: NiceZyme view
- KEGG: KEGG entry
- MetaCyc: metabolic pathway
- PRIAM: profile
- PDB structures: RCSB PDB PDBe PDBsum
Search
- PMC: articles
- PubMed: articles
- NCBI: proteins

Oviductin (EC 3.4.21.120, oviductal protease) is an enzyme found in the Japanese toad (Bufo japonicus) and in the African clawed frog (Xenopus laevis). Ovulated coelomic egg cells are not fertilisable in these species until they pass through the oviduct, where Oviductin is located. Oviductin catalyses the following chemical reaction in Xenopus laevis:

Preferential cleavage at Gly-Ser-Arg373- of glycoprotein gp43 in the coelemic egg envelope to yield gp41.
