= Ailao =

Ailao or Ai Lao may refer to:

- Ailao Mountains, Yunnan, China
- Ailao Kingdom, an ancient tribal alliance country in Yunnan, China
- Ailao toad (Bufo ailaoanus), a species of toad endemic to China
- 'Ailao, a traditional Samoan dance, a precursor to the Taualuga
- Ai Lao (r. 1476–1501), Saopha of Kengtung

== See also ==
- Laos
- Lao Ai (died 238 BCE), official of the State of Qin during the late Warring States period
