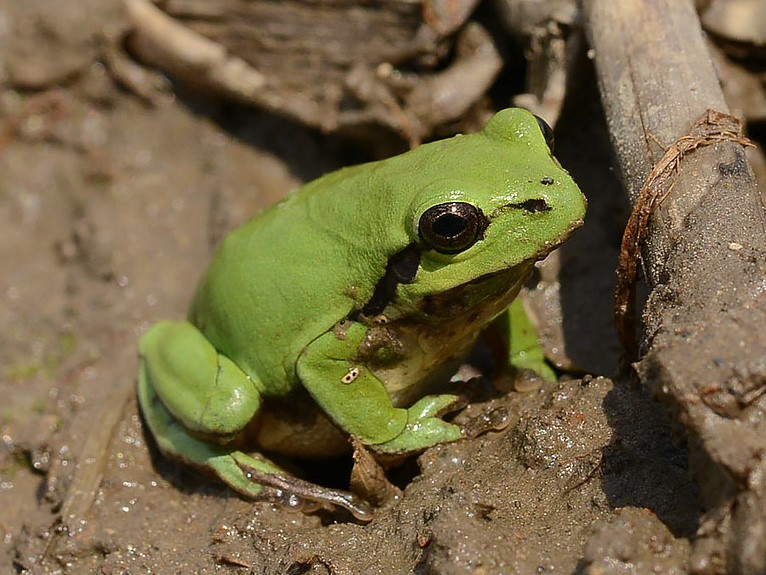

Scientific classification
- Kingdom: Animalia
- Phylum: Chordata
- Class: Amphibia
- Order: Anura
- Family: Hylidae
- Genus: Dryophytes
- Species: D. flaviventris

Binomial name
- Dryophytes flaviventris Borzée and Min, 2020

= Dryophytes flaviventris =

Species of amphibian

Dryophytes flaviventris, also known as the yellow-bellied tree frog, is a species of Ameroasian tree frog native to the central lowlands of South Korea, where it is known to occur in Buyeo, Nonsan and Iksan. It was described in 2020 after research showed it to have genetic and morphological differences compared to Dryophytes immaculatus and Dryophytes suweonensis. The yellow-bellied tree frog is geographically separated from D. suweonensis by the Chilgap mountain range, and from other Dryophytes species (including D. immaculatus) by the Yellow Sea. The yellow bellied tree frog is estimated to have split off from D. suweonensis approximately 0.97 million years ago.

The status of these tree frogs is currently not evaluated, but they are thought to be endangered as they have a very small range and are at risk of hybridization from other tree frogs.
