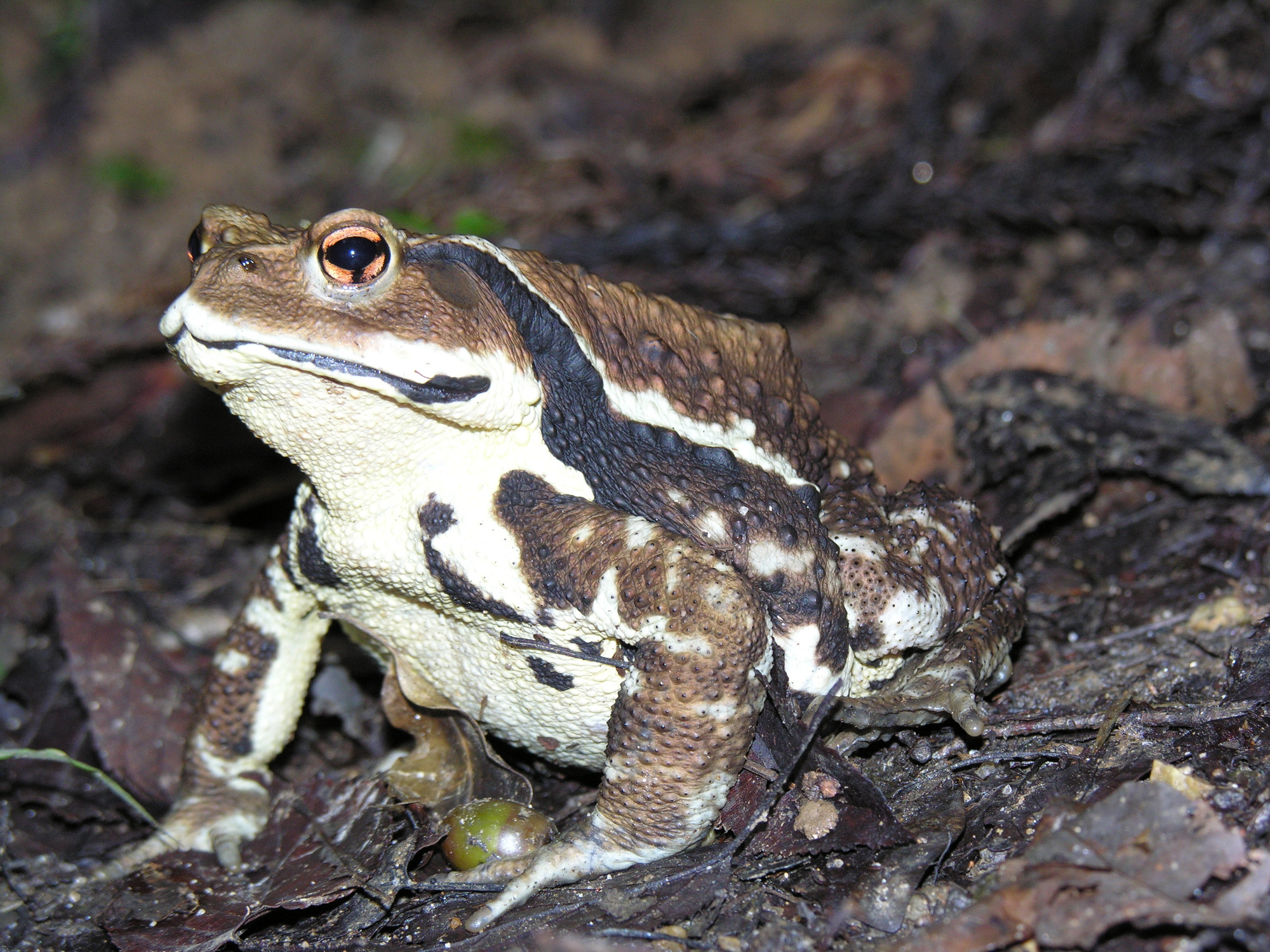

Conservation status
- Least Concern (IUCN 3.1)

Scientific classification
- Kingdom: Animalia
- Phylum: Chordata
- Class: Amphibia
- Order: Anura
- Family: Bufonidae
- Genus: Bufo
- Species: B. japonicus

Binomial name
- Bufo japonicus Temminck & Schlegel, 1838

Synonyms
- Bufo praetextatus Boie, 1826

= Japanese common toad =

Species of amphibian

The Japanese common toad, Japanese warty toad or Japanese toad (Bufo japonicus) is a species of toad in the family Bufonidae. It is endemic to Japan. Its natural habitats are subarctic forests, temperate forests, temperate shrubland, swamps, freshwater marshes, intermittent freshwater marshes, freshwater springs, arable land, rural gardens, urban areas, ponds, and irrigated land. Amplexus is the mating behaviour involved in the Japanese common toad during the breeding season.

== Taxonomy ==
This species was originally first described as Bufo praetextatus in 1826. However, the specimen that is used to name it is lost, and since this name is used by only a few authors, it is considered that B. japonicus is valid instead.

There are two subspecies, Western-Japanese common toad (Bufo japonicus japonicus) and Eastern-Japanese common toad (Bufo japonicus formosus). They are distinguished by the size of the tympanum, smaller in B. japonicus japonicus and larger in B. japonicus formosus. However, some taxonomic authorities consider B. japonicus formosus to be a separate species (B. formosus), leaving B. japonicus monotypic (having no subspecies).

B. japonicus formosus is known to hybridise in the wild with the Japanese stream toad Bufo torrenticola.

== Description ==
The Japanese common toad can reach a snout–to–vent length of up to about 17.5 cm (7 in), with females being a little larger than males, and toads living in warmer habitats growing larger than those in colder ones. The head has a pointed snout and is roughly triangular. The tympanum is elliptical and about as far behind the eye as its longest diameter. The body is robust and the stout forelimbs are about half as long as the hind limbs. The second finger on the hand is the shortest and the third the longest. On the hind foot, the first toe is the shortest and the fourth the longest. There is little webbing between the toes. The skin has small warty outgrowths and its colouring is variable, being greenish-brown, yellowish-brown or darker brown. It is often paler and smoother in the breeding season.

== Distribution ==
The Japanese common toad is native to Japan and is present on the islands of Honshu, Kyushu and Shikoku. It has also been introduced to Hokkaido and Sado Island. It is present in a wide variety of habitats including in lowland and mountainous areas.

== Biology ==
Bufo japonicus filmed in Tokyo, Japan

The Japanese common toad lives mainly on land, feeding on earthworms and small arthropods including ants and some species of beetle that are lamentable to other predators. It hibernates underground in the winter when the temperature falls below about 6 °C (43 °F). Breeding takes place in the spring when the toads congregate in shallow water bodies and long strings of eggs are laid and become tangled in underwater plants. The dark-coloured tadpoles grow to 30 or 40 mm (1.2 or 1.6 in) in length before emerging from the pond as juvenile toads in June.

== Reproduction ==
The Japanese common toad is known for their intense male-male competition hence the type of breeding associated to this species is explosive breeding. The mating pattern of these toads is not conclusive but the major one is polyandry through amplexus. Preceding mating is courtship which is based on tactile and visual senses. The release of sperms from males is a result of the luteinizing hormone increasing in production and this whole process is induced by amplexus as the males clasp to the females.The size of the males is actually vital in deciding which competitor pairs with the female. The bigger males can always replace the smaller ones especially because amplexus is involved and the eggs need to be fertilized to suit the female's preferences. This is known as size-assortative mating which leads to male-biased operational sex ratio and in turn highly affects the male-male competition. Population density and operational sex ratio are the two factors that contribute to how the males will compete for mating female partners. If the population of males in a specific breeding area is high, females are left with no other options but to practice polyandry.

Migration to breeding ponds is important in Bufo japonicus and this process is tracked by the production levels of the oscillatory potential changes (OSC). OSC levels are highest during the breeding month when the toads have reached their breeding destinations. Other hormones like luteinizing hormone and follicle-stimulating hormone also spiral up when the species reach the breeding site. In conclusion, the four processes that take place during the breeding season are emerging from hibernation, migration, amplexing, and ovulation in females or spermiation in males.

== Status ==
The Japanese common toad has a wide range and is tolerant of many different types of habitats including human-made ones. It is presumed to have a large total population and no significant decline in numbers has been observed so the International Union for Conservation of Nature has assessed its conservation status as being of "least concern".

== See also ==
- European toad
