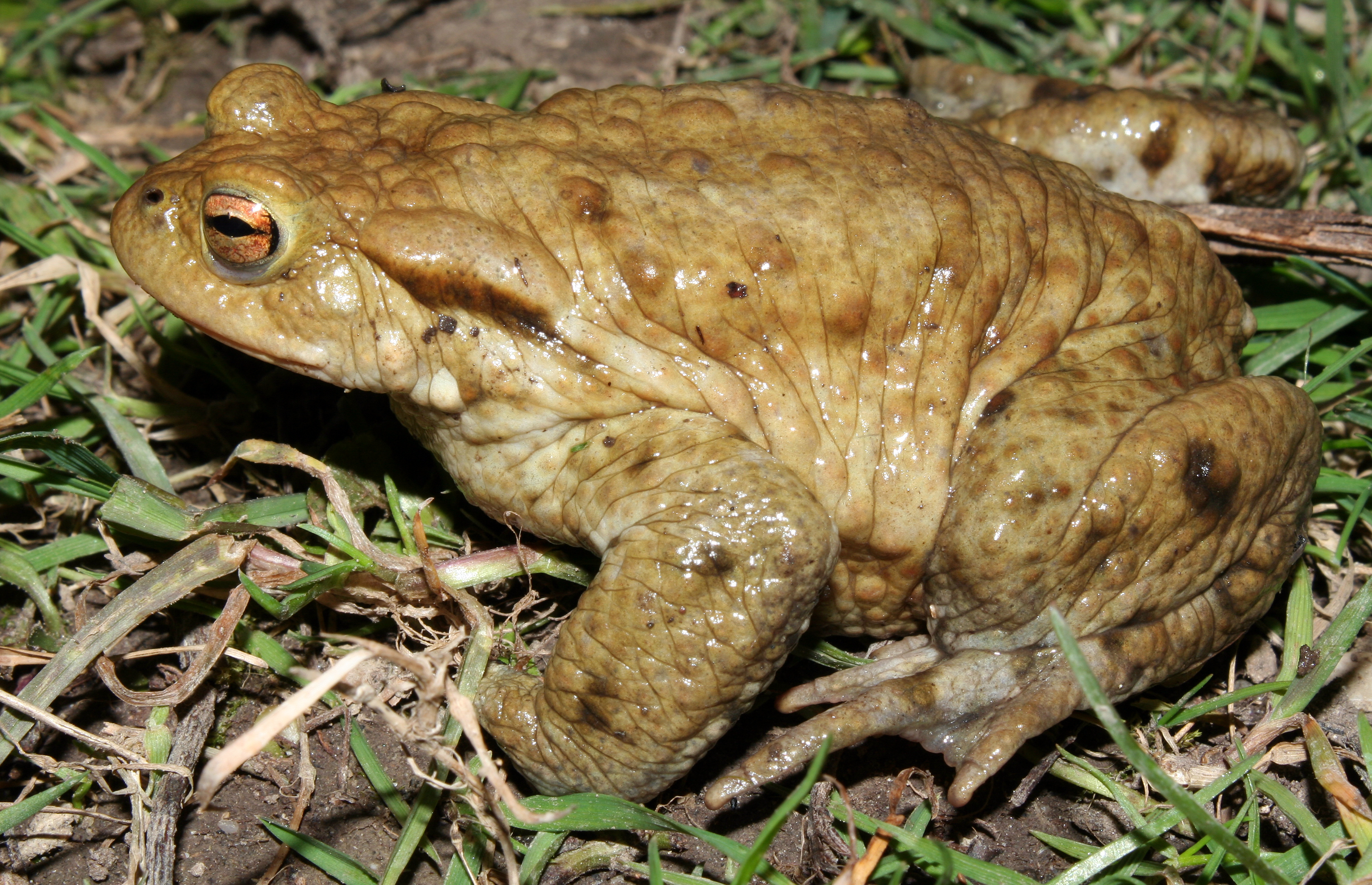
- Common (European) toad, B. bufo

Scientific classification
- Kingdom: Animalia
- Phylum: Chordata
- Class: Amphibia
- Order: Anura
- Family: Bufonidae
- Genus: Bufo; Garsault, 1764

Species
- See text

= Bufo =

Genus of amphibians

Bufo (/ˈbjuːfoʊ/) is a genus of true toads in the amphibian family Bufonidae. As traditionally defined, it was a wastebasket genus containing a large number of toads from much of the world but following taxonomic reviews most of these have been moved to other genera, leaving only seventeen extant species from Europe, northern Africa and Asia in this genus, including the well-known common toad (B. bufo). Some of the genera that contain species formerly placed in Bufo are Anaxyrus (many North American species), Bufotes (European green toad and relatives), Duttaphrynus (many Asian species, including the Asian common toad introduced elsewhere), Epidalea (natterjack toad) and Rhinella (many Latin American species, including the cane toad introduced elsewhere).

== Description ==
True toads have in common stocky figures and short legs, which make them relatively poor jumpers. Their dry skin is thick and "warty".

Behind their eyes, Bufo species have wart-like structures, the parotoid glands. These glands distinguish the true toads from all other tailless amphibians. They secrete a fatty, white poisonous substance which acts as a deterrent to predators. Contrary to folk belief, handling toads does not cause warts, however due to the poison they secrete, and bacteria on their skins, a person should wash their hands thoroughly after handling one. The poison of most if not all toads contains bufotoxin.

== Species ==
Formerly, the genus Bufo encompassed many species and was divided into several subgenera. Frost et al. (2006) removed most of the species of former Bufo to other genera and restricted the name Bufo to members of the Bufo bufo group of earlier authors. Now, this genus has been reduced to 24 extant species:

Binomial name and author	Common name
Bufo ailaoanus Kou, 1984	Ailao toad
Bufo andrewsi (Schmidt, 1925)	Andrew's toad
Bufo aspinius (Yang, Liu, and Rao, 1996)	Spineless stream toad
Bufo bankorensis (Barbour, 1908)	Central Formosa toad, Bankor toad
Bufo bufo (Linnaeus, 1758)	Common toad, European toad
Bufo cryptotympanicus (Liu & Hu, 1962)	Earless toad
Bufo eichwaldi (Litvinchuk, Borkin, Skorinov, and Rosanov, 2008)	Eichwald's toad, Talysh toad
Bufo exiguus (Qi, Lyu, Song, Wei, Zhong, and Wang, 2023)
Bufo formosus (Boulenger, 1883)
Bufo gargarizans (Cantor, 1842)	Chusan Island toad, Asiatic toad
†Bufo linquensis (Yang, 1977)
Bufo luchunnicus (Yang and Rao, 2008)	Luchun stream toad
Bufo menglianus (Yang, 2008)	Menglian stream toad
Bufo minshanicus (Stejneger, 1926)
Bufo pageoti (Bourret, 1937)	Tonkin toad
Bufo japonicus (Boie, 1826)	Japanese common toad, Japanese warty toad, Japanese toad
Bufo sachalinensis (Nikolskii, 1905)
Bufo spinosus (Daudin, 1803)	Spiny toad, spiny common toad, giant toad
Bufo stejnegeri (Schmidt, 1931)	Korean water toad, Stejneger's toad, Korean toad, water toad
Bufo tibetanus (Zarevskii, 1926 "1925")	Tibetan toad
Bufo tuberculatus (Zarevskij, 1926)	Qinghai Lake toad, round-warted toad
Bufo tuberospinius (Yang, Liu, and Rao, 1996)
Bufo torrenticola (Matsui, 1976)	Japanese stream toad, Honshū toad
Bufo verrucosissimus (Pallas, 1814)	Caucasian toad
Bufo yongdeensis (Rao, Liu, Ma, and Zhu, 2022 "2020")
Bufo yunlingensis Rao, Liu, Ma, and Zhu, 2022 "2020"

== Conservation and awareness ==
International Toad Day is held annually on May 15 to promote awareness of toads and their conservation. The initiative began in Israel in 2026 and has since been presented internationally.
