= Bufo aspinius =

Conservation status
- Endangered (IUCN 3.1)

Scientific classification
- Kingdom: Animalia
- Phylum: Chordata
- Class: Amphibia
- Order: Anura
- Family: Bufonidae
- Genus: Bufo
- Species: B. aspinius

Binomial name
- Bufo aspinius (Yang & Rao, 1996)

Species of amphibian

Bufo aspinius (commonly known as the spineless stream toad) is a species of toad in the family Bufonidae, described in 1996. It is endemic to China, specifically Yangbi Yi Autonomous County, west of Yunling Mountains in Yunnan Province and occurs at 1800 to 2200 meters elevation. Its natural habitats are subtropical or tropical moist montane forests, rivers, swamps, and arable land. This species is threatened by habitat loss for smallholder farming and it only occurs in one known protected area Tongbiguan Nature Reserve.
