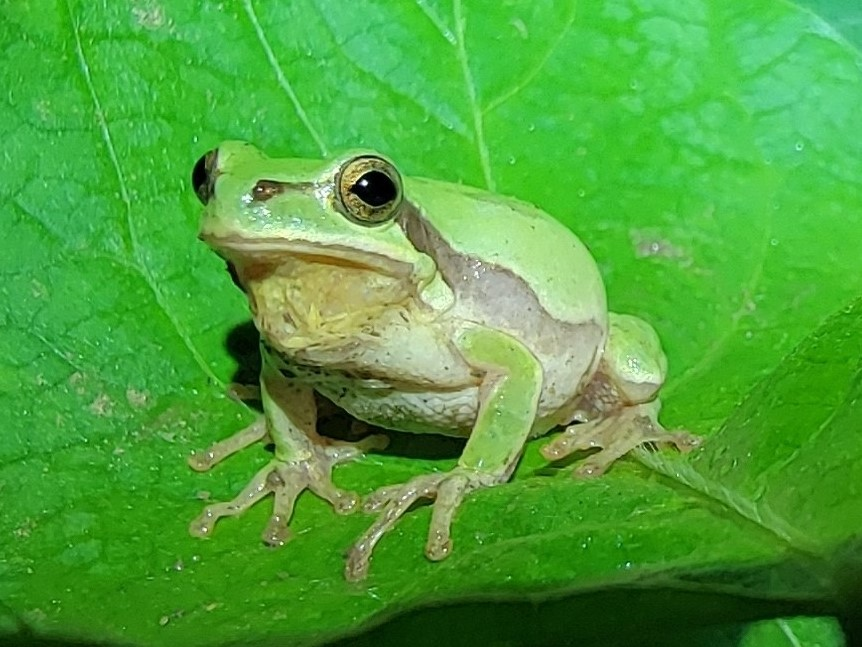

Conservation status
- Least Concern (IUCN 3.1)

Scientific classification
- Kingdom: Animalia
- Phylum: Chordata
- Class: Amphibia
- Order: Anura
- Family: Hylidae
- Genus: Dryophytes
- Species: D. immaculatus

Binomial name
- Dryophytes immaculatus (Boettger, 1888)

Synonyms
- Hyla immaculata Boettger, 1888

= Dryophytes immaculatus =

Species of amphibian

Dryophytes immaculatus, the Chinese immaculate treefrog, is a species of frog in the family Hylidae endemic to China. The natural habitat of the species has been generally transformed into rice fields and it is threatened by habitat loss.

The species has very strongly declined in population size of the last decades, similarly to the sister species Dryophytes suweonensis and Dryophytes flaviventris.
