= Bufo pageoti =

Conservation status
- Least Concern (IUCN 3.1)

Scientific classification
- Kingdom: Animalia
- Phylum: Chordata
- Class: Amphibia
- Order: Anura
- Family: Bufonidae
- Genus: Bufo
- Species: B. pageoti

Binomial name
- Bufo pageoti Bourret, 1937

Synonyms
- Bufo burmanus Andersson, 1939; Phrynoidis burmanus (Andersson, 1939); Torrentophryne burmanus (Andersson, 1939); Torrentophryne pageoti (Bourret, 1937)

Species of amphibian

Bufo pageoti, also known as Tonkin toad or Burma(n) toad (when referring to no-longer-recognized Bufo burmanus) is a species of toad in the family Bufonidae. It is found in southern China (Yunnan), north-east and western Myanmar, and northern Vietnam. It is a medium-sized toad, with males measuring about 64 mm (2.5 in) and females about 67 mm (2.6 in) in length.

Bufo pageoti occurs in forested mountain areas, probably also in the surrounding farmland, at elevations of 1,900–2,500 m (6,200–8,200 ft) above sea level. It breeds in streams. It is a rare species threatened by habitat loss caused agricultural expansion. It occurs in some protected areas, including the Gaoligongshan National Nature Reserve in Yunnan.
