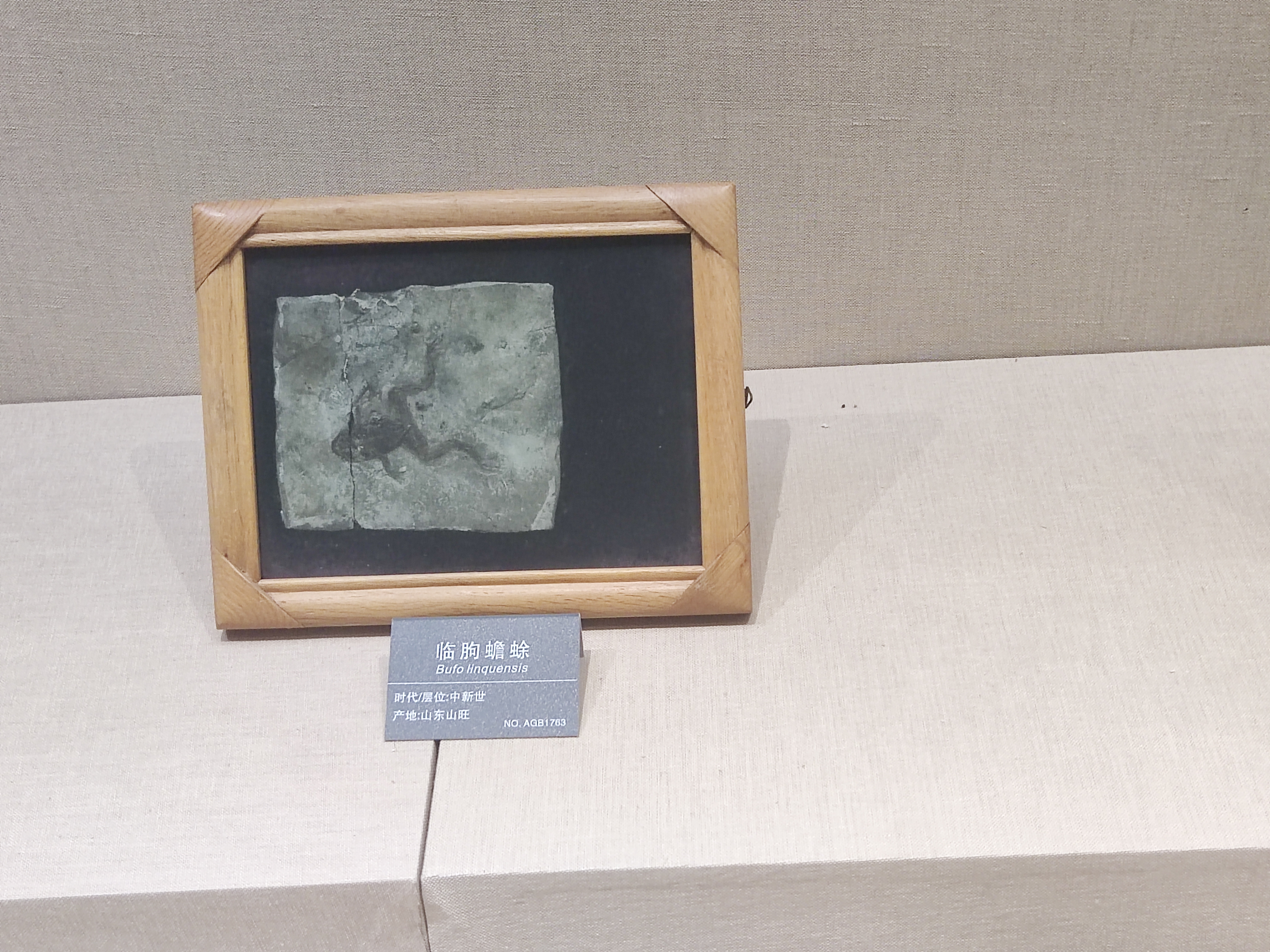

Scientific classification
- Kingdom: Animalia
- Phylum: Chordata
- Class: Amphibia
- Order: Anura
- Family: Bufonidae
- Genus: Bufo
- Species: †B. linquensis

Binomial name
- †Bufo linquensis Yang, 1977

= Bufo linquensis =

Bufo linquensis Temporal range: Early Miocene, 15.97–11.608 Ma

Species of amphibian

Bufo linquensis is a prehistoric species of toad that lived in the Miocene of China. It is known from Shanwang, Shandong province.
