= Bufo exiguus =

Scientific classification
- Kingdom: Animalia
- Phylum: Chordata
- Class: Amphibia
- Order: Anura
- Family: Bufonidae
- Genus: Bufo
- Species: B. exiguus

Binomial name
- Bufo exiguus Qi, Lyu, Song, Wei, Zhong, and Wang, 2023

Species of amphibian

Bufo exiguus, the Guangdong stream toad, is a species of toad in the family Bufonidae. It was first described in 2023 within Mt. Nankun, of the Guangdong Providence of China. They are a stream-dwelling toad that inhabits primarily slow moving mountainous streams.

== Description ==
These toads are a faded greyish-brown in color.Adult males of B. Exiguus measure about 43.2–43.3 mm (1.7 in) while adult females measure to about 48.5–52.4 mm (1.9–2.1 in) in snout-to-vent length. Both the tympanum and tarsal fold are notably absent. The paratoid glands are reduced and oblong in shape. Males possess several white granular nuptial spinules on the inner surfaces of their fingers.
