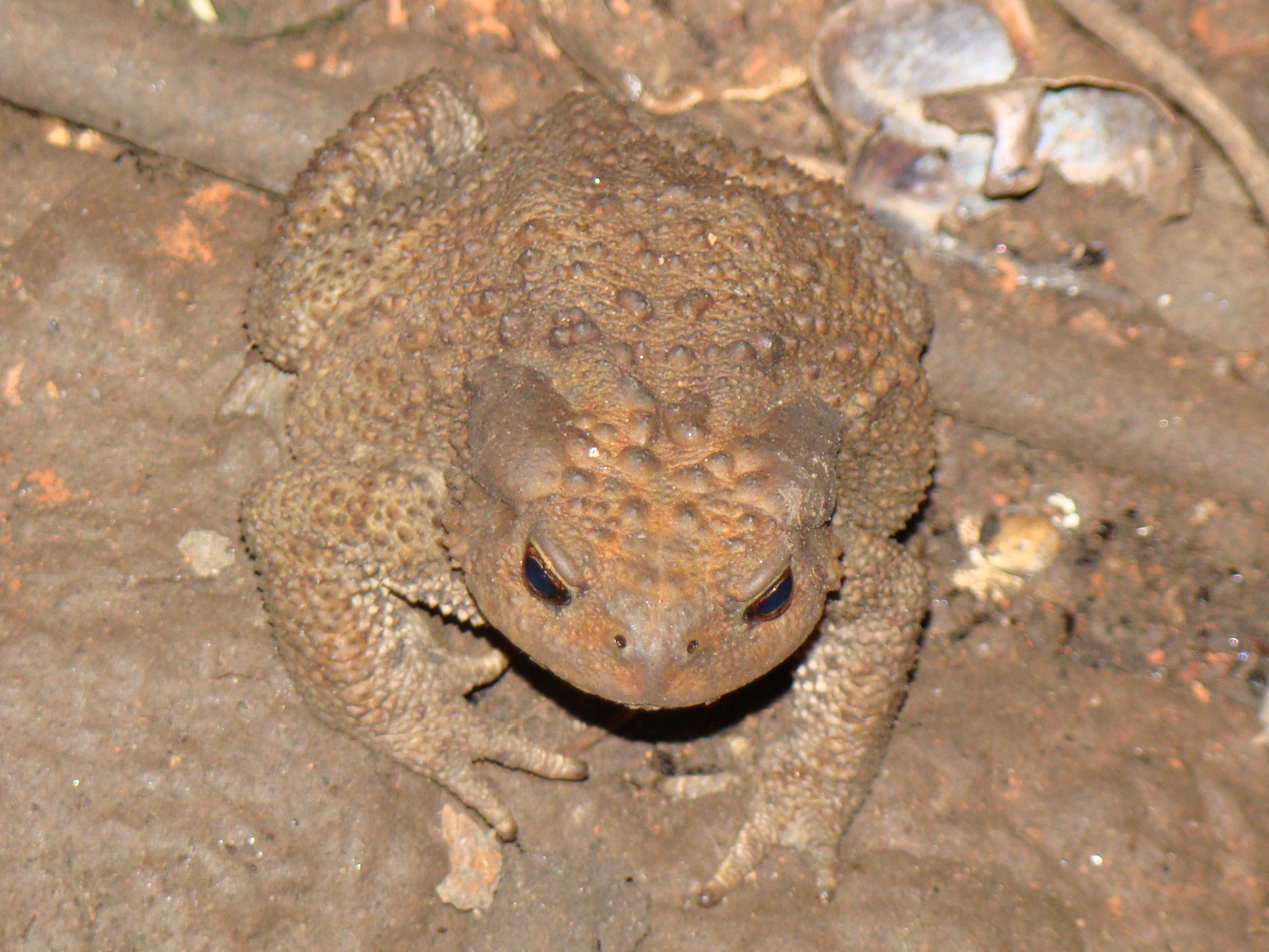

Conservation status
- Least Concern (IUCN 3.1)

Scientific classification
- Kingdom: Animalia
- Phylum: Chordata
- Class: Amphibia
- Order: Anura
- Family: Bufonidae
- Genus: Bufo
- Species: B. verrucosissimus

Binomial name
- Bufo verrucosissimus (Pallas, 1814)

Synonyms
- Bufo colchicus Eichwald, 1831; Rana caucasica Pallas, 1814

= Caucasian toad =

Species of amphibian

The Caucasian toad (Bufo verrucosissimus) is a species of toad in the family Bufonidae. It is found in Azerbaijan, Georgia, Lebanon, Iran, Russia, and Turkey. Its natural habitats are temperate forests, subtropical or tropical moist lowland forests, intermittent rivers, rural gardens, ponds, and aquaculture ponds. It is threatened by habitat loss.

== Gallery ==
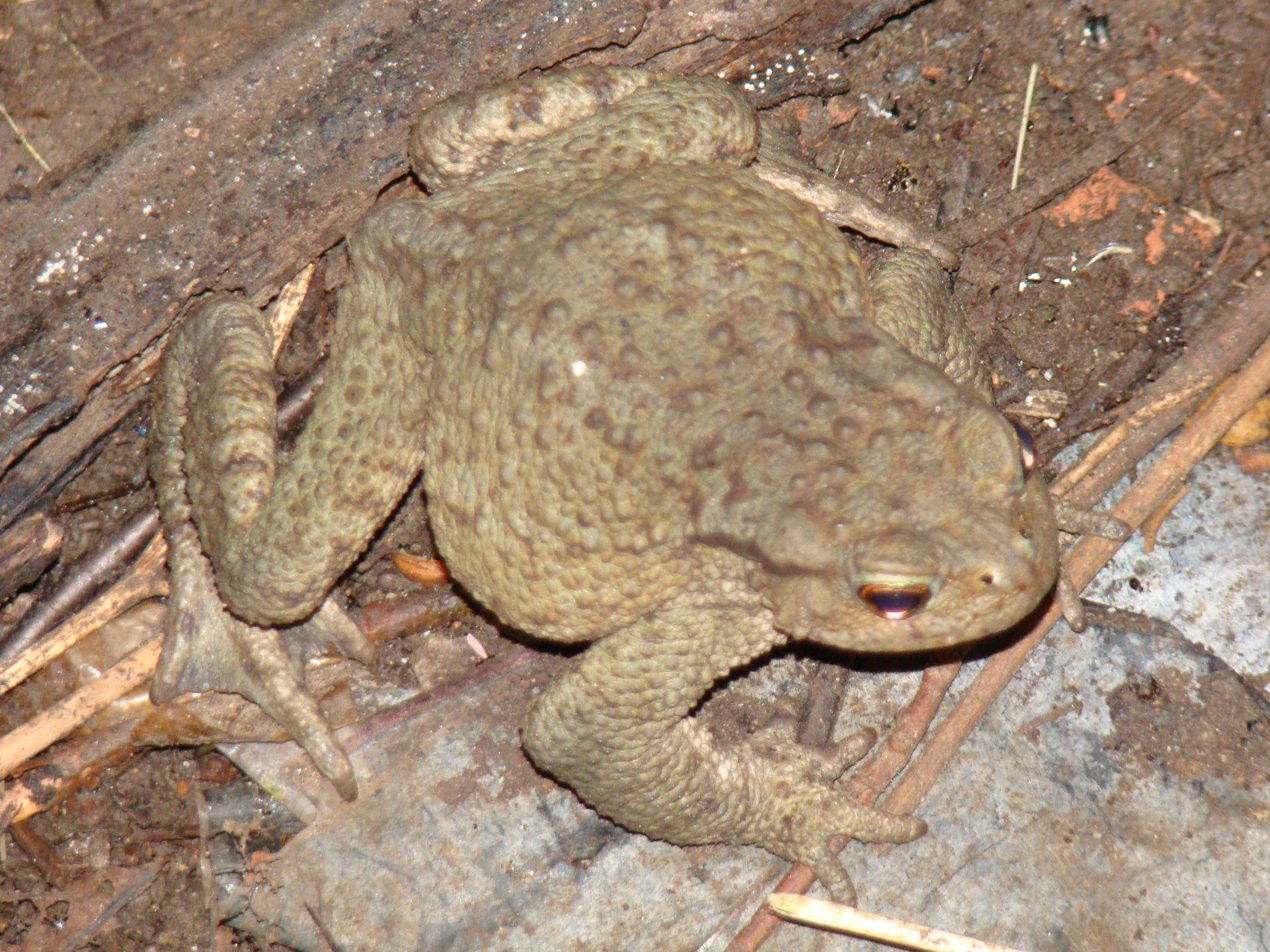

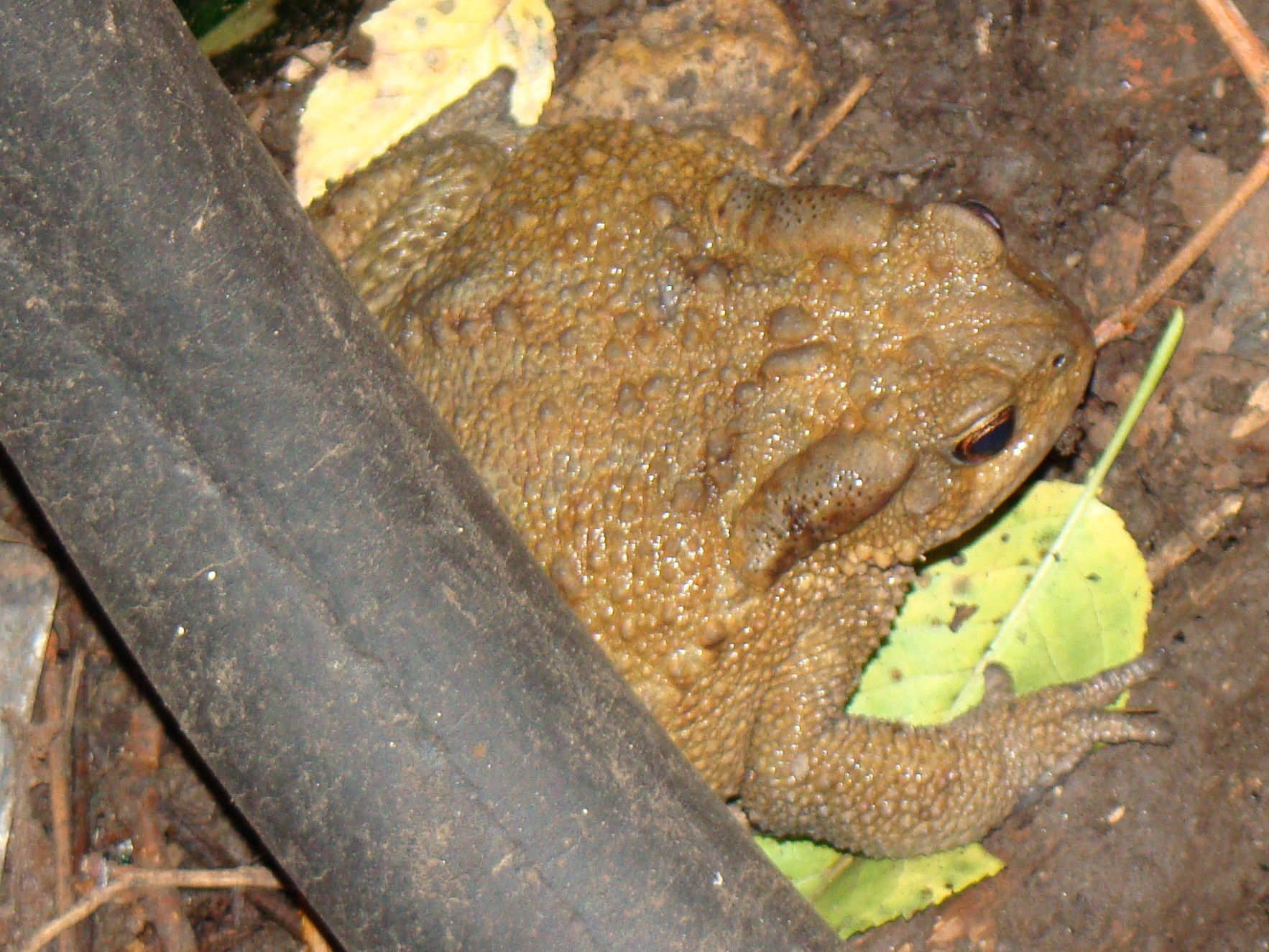
