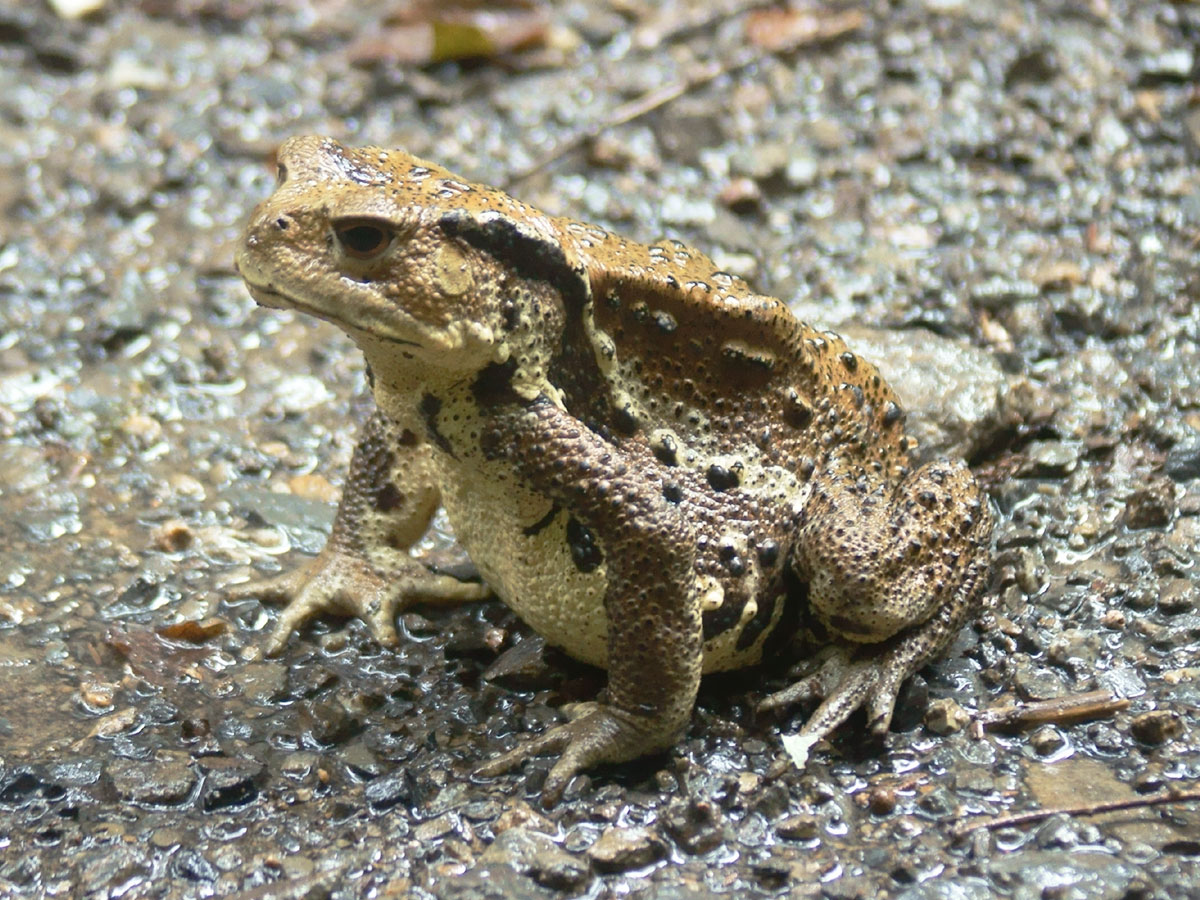

Conservation status
- Least Concern (IUCN 3.1)

Scientific classification
- Kingdom: Animalia
- Phylum: Chordata
- Class: Amphibia
- Order: Anura
- Family: Bufonidae
- Genus: Bufo
- Species: B. torrenticola

Binomial name
- Bufo torrenticola Matsui, 1976

= Japanese stream toad =

Species of amphibian

The Japanese stream toad (Bufo torrenticola), also known as the Honshū toad, is a species of toad in the family Bufonidae. It was first described by Masafumi Matsui in 1976 during research with Kyoto University as a "moderate to large-sized toad" with a "peculiar color pattern" and "stream-dwelling habits."

It is endemic to Japan. Its natural habitats are temperate forests and rivers, mainly in the mountainous regions of Japan. It is threatened by habitat loss.

== Reproduction ==
Studies in rivers throughout the Toyama Bay region of Honshu, the main island of Japan, showed interbreeding between Bufo torrenticola and Bufo japonicus formosus which is another species of toad endemic to Japan. Hybrids of these species tend to resemble Bufo torrenticola more closely in terms of morphology, making mitochondrial DNA analysis the only way to identify between purebreds of either species and hybrids.

It is believed that Bufo torrenticola is the only species of toad in Japan that spawns in streams rather than lentic habitats. In these stream habitats, pools were the preferred site for spawning when compared with riffles and puddles. In this same study, which was conducted over two years, it was noted that the same specific pools were used for spawning both years, suggesting site recognition by chemical or physical cues or possibly more complex requirements for viable breeding sites that need further study.

One theory presented as to how Bufo torrenticola and Bufo japonicus formosus were able to hybridize despite having different breeding sites was that flooding in the region had caused an overlap in lentic puddles and stream pools. Spawning at the same time and at the same sites allows for easy hybridization between the species; whether coincidental or consequential, both species have been demoted to species of least concern by the IUCN.

== Morphology ==
As a result of being the only stream spawning member of the family Bufonidae in Japan, it has morphological characteristics that distinguish it from other species, particularly Bufo japonicus formosus, which is closely related. The main adaptive characteristics noted have been long toe phalanges, more streamlined skulls, and large foot webs that make Bufo torrenticola better suited to life in torrential waters. Early descriptions of Bufo torrenticola by Masafumi Matsui note that it lacks cranial crests, has limbs generally longer than Bufo bufo, and has a reduced tympanum.
