= Ailao toad =

Conservation status
- Endangered (IUCN 3.1)

Scientific classification
- Kingdom: Animalia
- Phylum: Chordata
- Class: Amphibia
- Order: Anura
- Family: Bufonidae
- Genus: Bufo
- Species: B. ailaoanus

Binomial name
- Bufo ailaoanus Kou, 1984

Species of amphibian

The Ailao toad (Bufo ailaoanus) is a species of toad in the family Bufonidae. It is endemic to China. Its natural habitats are subtropical or tropical moist montane forests and rivers. It was discovered in the Ailaoshan National Nature Reserve in Ailao Mountains, Yunnan. The toad was first described in 1984 and has not been seen since, as it is hard to find and thought to be rare. It is a small toad, about 40 mm (1.6 in) in length.
