= Huanren frog =

Conservation status
- Least Concern (IUCN 3.1)

Scientific classification
- Kingdom: Animalia
- Phylum: Chordata
- Class: Amphibia
- Order: Anura
- Family: Ranidae
- Genus: Rana
- Species: R. huanrensis

Binomial name
- Rana huanrensis Fei, Ye & Huang, 1991

Species of amphibian

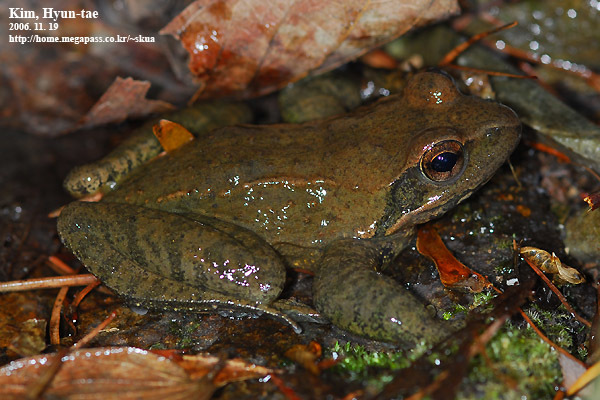
Huanren frog (Rana huanrensis)

The Huanren frog (Rana huanrensis) is a species of true frog found in East Asia. It was originally believed to be endemic to Huanren County, Liaoning, China, but was later also found in South Korea; it is presumed to be present in North Korea, as well. It is closely related to the Dybowski's frog, Rana dybowskii, and specimens collected before 1991 were incorrectly identified as that species. Distinguishing factors include the absence of a vocal sac.

The Huanren frog is found in and around rivers and streams in hilly terrain. The type locality in Huanren is 520 m (1,710 ft) above sea level, and specimens from Korea have also only been found at altitudes over 500 m (1,600 ft). Specimens from South Korea have been collected in the provinces of Gangwon-do, Gyeongsangbuk-do, and eastern Gyeonggi-do. Egg clutches, which are small and clustered, are deposited on submerged rocks in the streams which this species favors.
