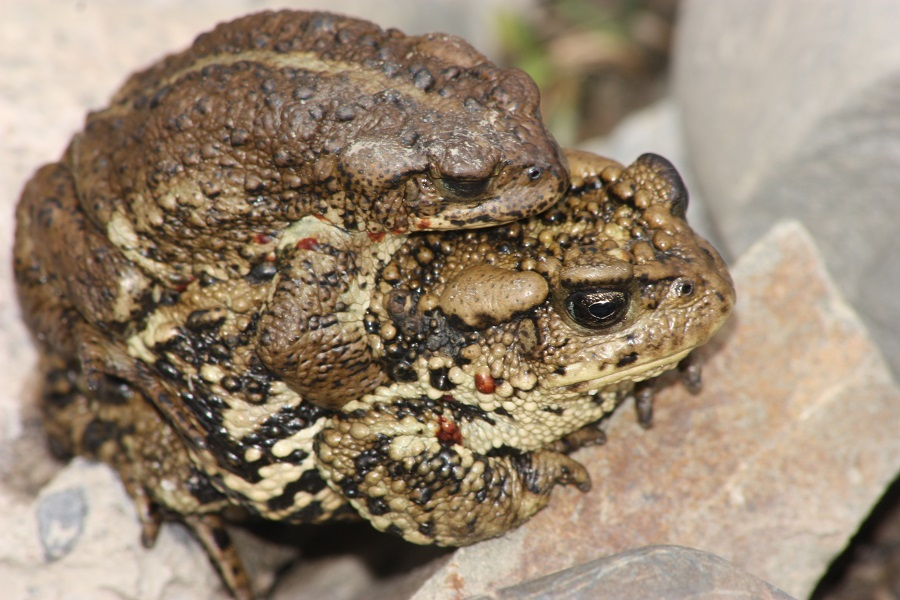

Conservation status
- Least Concern (IUCN 3.1)

Scientific classification
- Domain: Eukaryota
- Kingdom: Animalia
- Phylum: Chordata
- Class: Amphibia
- Order: Anura
- Family: Bufonidae
- Genus: Bufo
- Species: B. tibetanus

Binomial name
- Bufo tibetanus Zarevsky, 1926

= Tibetan toad =

Species of amphibian

The Tibetan toad (Bufo tibetanus) is a species of toad in the family Bufonidae. It is endemic to China (easternmost Tibet, southernmost Qinghai, and western Sichuan to northernmost Yunnan) and extreme north-eastern India (Arunachal Pradesh). Its natural habitats are temperate grassland, subtropical or tropical high-altitude grassland, swamps, freshwater marshes, intermittent freshwater marshes, and arable land. It is threatened by habitat loss.
