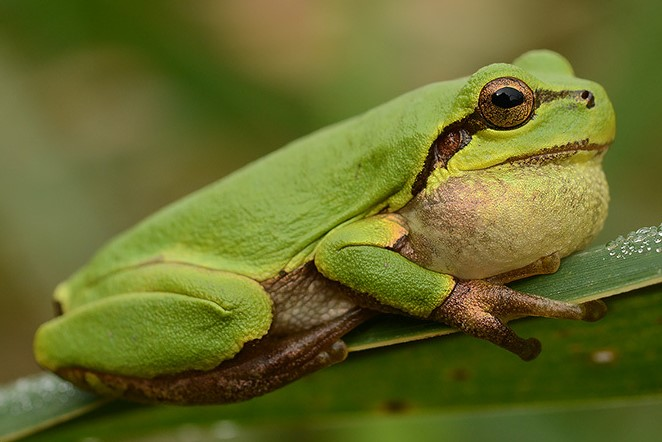

Conservation status
- Endangered (IUCN 3.1)

Scientific classification
- Kingdom: Animalia
- Phylum: Chordata
- Class: Amphibia
- Order: Anura
- Family: Hylidae
- Genus: Dryophytes
- Species: D. suweonensis

Binomial name
- Dryophytes suweonensis (Kuramoto, 1980)

Synonyms
- Hyla suweonensis Kuramoto, 1980

= Dryophytes suweonensis =

Suweon treefrog

Species of amphibian

Dryophytes suweonensis, the Suweon treefrog or Suwon treefrog, is a species of frog in the family Hylidae endemic to the Korean Peninsula probably from the Imjin River to the Mangyeong River, south of Iksan. Its distribution and population have been assessed to be below 800 individuals and the status of the species has been updated as Endangered by the IUCN. The natural habitat of the species has been generally transformed into rice fields and it is threatened by habitat loss.

The population size of the species has very strongly declined in population size, similarly to the sister species Dryophytes immaculatus and Dryophytes flaviventris.

The Suweon tree frog and the Japanese tree frog, which is also found in the same region, are the only two hylid species found on the Korean Peninsula. Factors distinguishing them include the frequency of the call, calling behavior, webbing between the toes and the angle of the line between the eyes and nostrils. The type locality for the Suweon tree frog is a rice paddy near the Office of Rural Development in Suwon. It has a lifestyle similar to the Japanese tree frog, breeding in rice paddies. The species is not known to breed at any natural site, and microhabitat segregation differentiate them from the Japanese tree frog. The species is evolutionary significant due to its unusual ZW karyotype.

The Suweon tree frog is listed as an "Endangered category I species" in Korea on basis of its limited distribution range and small population size. Besides, it is known to display high prevalence of Chytrid Fungus. However, this frog has also been listed as an invasive species in the United States.

== See also ==
- List of amphibians of Korea
