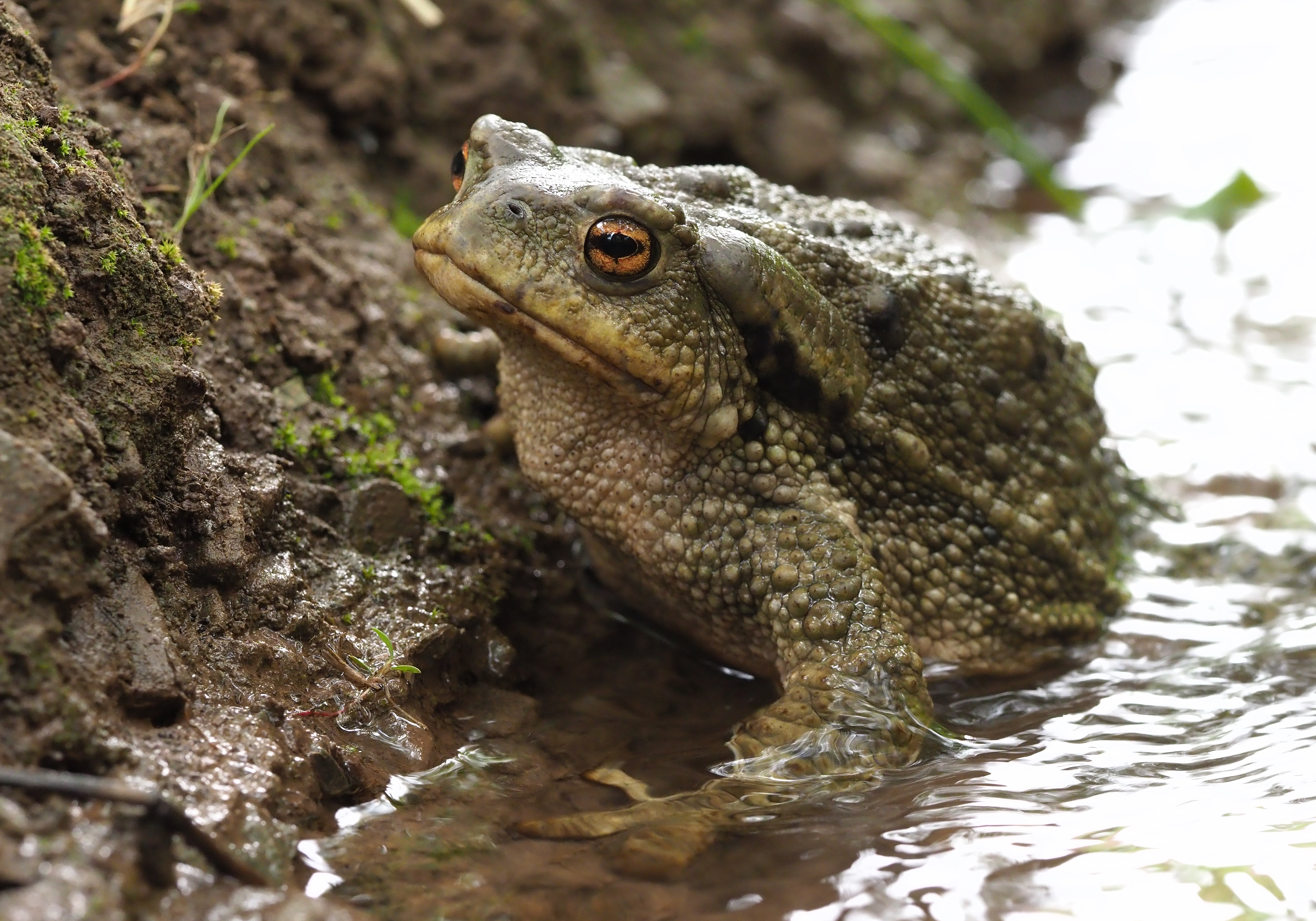

Conservation status
- Least Concern (IUCN 3.1)

Scientific classification
- Kingdom: Animalia
- Phylum: Chordata
- Class: Amphibia
- Order: Anura
- Family: Bufonidae
- Genus: Bufo
- Species: B. spinosus

Binomial name
- Bufo spinosus Daudin, 1803

= Spiny toad =

Proposed species of toad

The spiny toad, spiny common toad, or giant toad (Bufo spinosus) is a species of toad native to the Iberian Peninsula, southern France, extreme northwestern Italy, and North Africa (Morocco, Algeria, and Tunisia), with an isolated population in Jersey in the Channel Islands. For much of the 20th century, it was considered either a synonym or a subspecies of common toad Bufo bufo, but it is now classified as a separate species.

== Description ==
Adult males measure 58.6–112 mm (2.3–4.4 in) and adult females 65–180 mm (2.6–7.1 in) in snout–vent length.

== Diet ==
These toads feed on a number of invertebrates from earthworms to insects and woodlice.

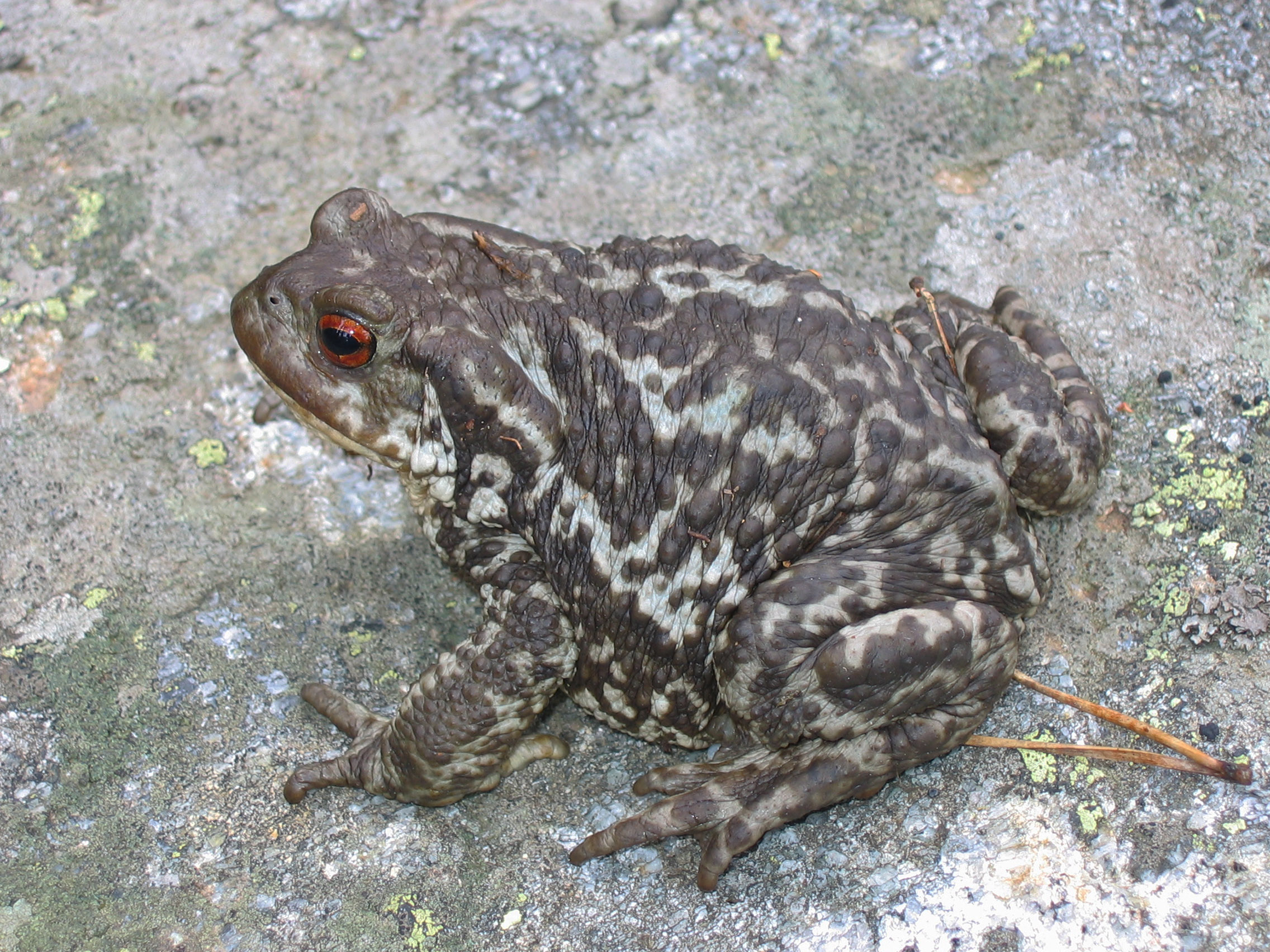

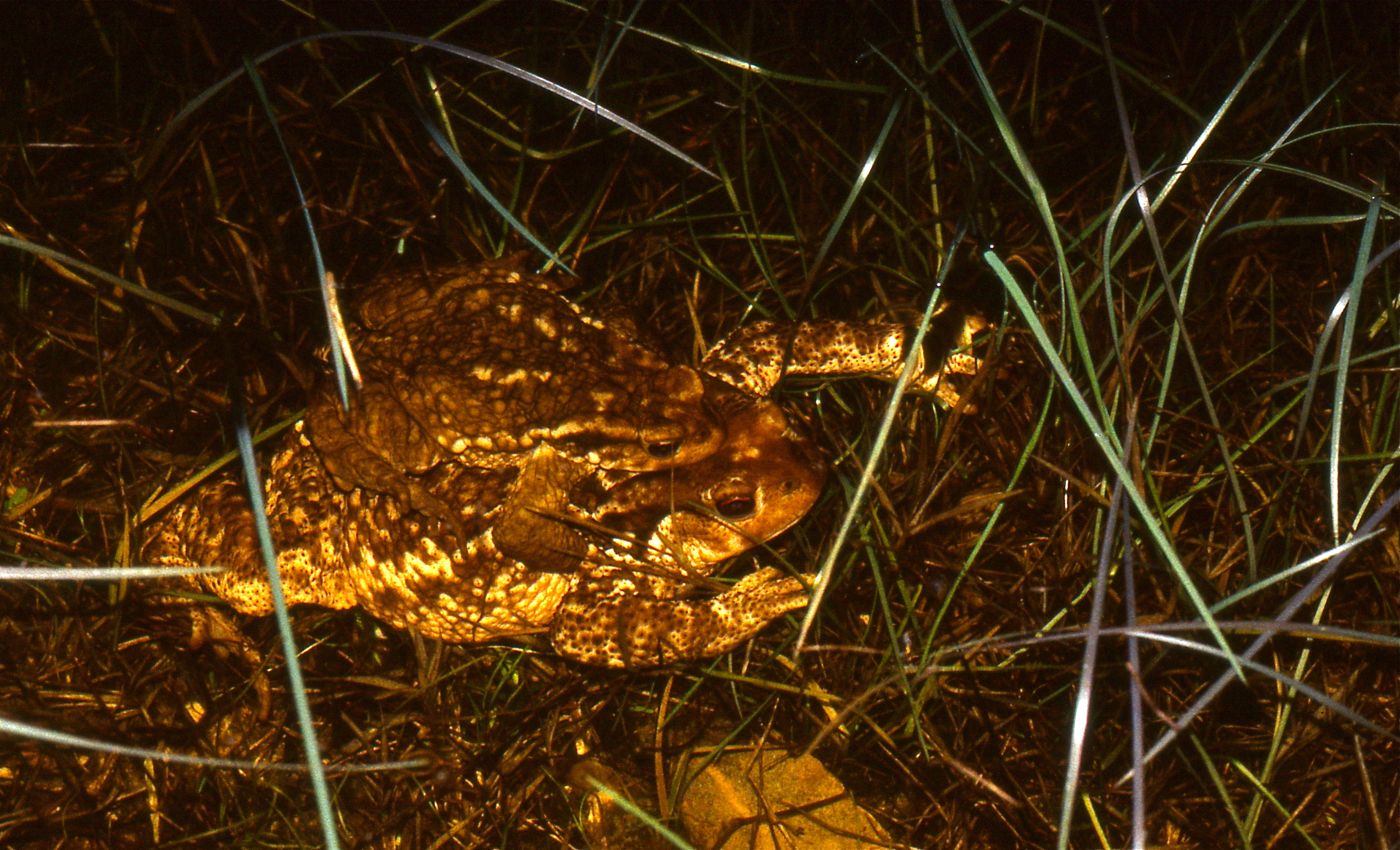
Pair of spiny toads mating
