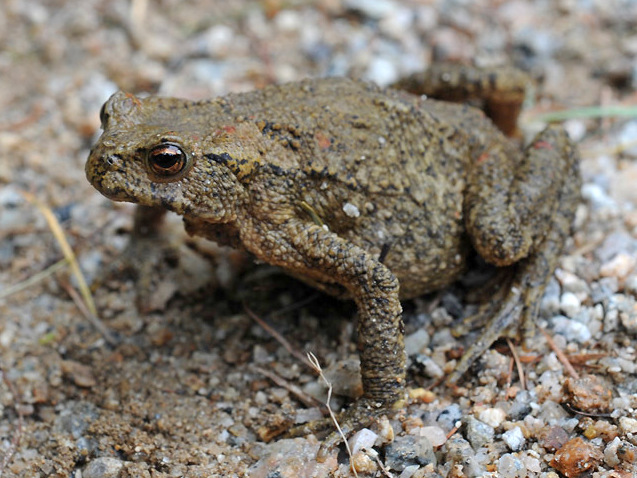

Conservation status
- Least Concern (IUCN 3.1)

Scientific classification
- Kingdom: Animalia
- Phylum: Chordata
- Class: Amphibia
- Order: Anura
- Family: Bufonidae
- Genus: Bufo
- Species: B. stejnegeri

Binomial name
- Bufo stejnegeri Schmidt, 1931

Synonyms
- Bufo kangi Kang and Sunwoo, 1973 – nomen nudum; Bufo kangi Yoon, 1975; Bufo cycloparotidos Zhao and Huang, 1982

= Korean water toad =

Species of amphibian

The Korean water toad, Korean toad, water toad, or Stejneger's toad (Bufo stejnegeri), is a species of toad found in East Asia. Two distinct populations are known to exist, one in eastern Liaoning province of northeastern China, and one in the central mountains of the Korean Peninsula. Within South Korea, it is found in eastern Gyeonggi (specifically Gapyeong) and also in Gangwon-do (particularly the Odaesan mountain complex). In addition, it is expected that there are or have been additional populations in the region between central Korea and Liaoning.

The classification of the Korean water toad into the genus Bufo was challenged in a 2006 paper. However, no alternative classification was proposed and the species is at present provisionally allocated to Bufo.

The Korean water toad is found inland, at elevations from 200 to 700 meters above sea level. As its name suggests, it favors water, and is typically found in wooded riparian areas. Breeding and egg-laying take place in the waters of streams and rivers. Bufo stejnegeri exhibits specific behaviors during amplexus and egg-laying behavior that make it distinct from other species. Bufo stejnegeri has unique ecology for a toad because they are semi-aquatic and breed in lotic environments. Between November and January, males and females enter streams and immediately begin amplexus. They stay in amplexus for 3–6 months in frozen-over streams until spring spawning (March–April) and lay eggs in fast-flowing streams under rocks. The water toad is typically nocturnal, but is also active during the day during the summer rains.

Because of their superficial similarity to frogs, Korean water toads are sometimes eaten. However, like other toads, they are poisonous. A case of severe poisoning from a digoxin-like immunoreactive substance was reported in 1998.
