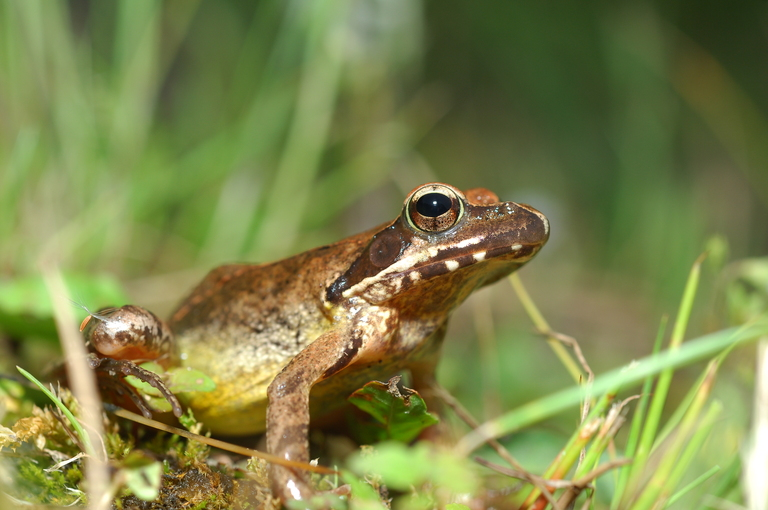

Conservation status
- Least Concern (IUCN 3.1)

Scientific classification
- Kingdom: Animalia
- Phylum: Chordata
- Class: Amphibia
- Order: Anura
- Family: Ranidae
- Genus: Rana
- Species: R. dybowskii

Binomial name
- Rana dybowskii Günther, 1876

= Dybowski's frog =

Species of amphibian

Dybowski's frog (Rana dybowskii) is a species of true frog found in Northeast Asia. It is found in the Russian Far East, the Korean Peninsula, and the Japanese island of Tsushima. Populations in northeastern China were formerly classified as the subspecies Rana chensinensis changbaishanensis, which is now regarded as a synonym of R. dybowskii.

The Dybowski's frog is fairly tolerant of human disturbance; however, it has been threatened across portions of its range due to heavy collection for use in traditional Chinese medicine. It breeds in slow-moving and stagnant water, and when not breeding, is most commonly found in woodlands. The species covers a wide range of altitudes, from sea level to 900 m, and possibly higher.

Adult Dybowski's frogs have a body length of 4.5–7.5 cm (1.8–3.0 in). The head and body are relatively broad; the skin is generally smooth, but with some small protuberances along the back. The male has a pair of vocal sacs which are used during the mating season. The back is largely tan to dark brown, and the belly is white.

== Ecology ==
Dybowski’s frog goes through significant physiological and microbial changes as the species both prepares for and emerges from fall hibernation. During their hibernation period, the frogs migrate from their usual forest habitats to their hibernation sites, which include spring-fed ponds, fast-flowing streams, and rivers. Male frogs arrive at the hibernation site before females, and juveniles arrive before adults; Dybowski's frog hibernates in groups up to 1,000 individuals.

The gut microbiome of Dybowski's frog is more diverse in the summer than it is during the autumn and winter, probably in large part due to fasting during hibernation. During their migration, the frog's gut microbiota also show circadian fluctuations in the abundance of different bacterial taxa. The specific genera involved depend on the sex of the frog; these changes are believed to help the regulation of digestion and energy storage in preparation for hibernation.

During the hibernation period itself, the gut microbiota shift again. These changes are believed to support nutrient absorption and metabolism as the frogs prepare to resume their normal activity during the spring. Across all seasons, the dominant bacteria phyla in the gut microbiome of Dybowski's frog are Firmicutes, Proteobacteria, Bacteroidetes, and Actinobacteria.
