= Amphibians of Western Australia =

The Amphibians of Western Australia are represented by two families of frogs. Of the 78 species found, most within the southwest, 38 are unique to the state. 15 of the 30 genera of Australian frogs occur; from arid regions and coastlines to permanent wetlands.

Frog species in Western Australia have not suffered the major declines of populations and diversity of many parts of the world. No species is recorded as having become extinct, despite over 50% of recent worldwide extinctions being Australian.

Three species are listed as Threatened, two as Vulnerable and Anstisia alba as Critically endangered. Threats to the species include the fungal disease Chytridiomycosis, though no infection has yet been recorded, and damage to habitat from altered land use and fire regimes. These processes have caused decline in many populations, however, some have successfully colonized newly created habitats such as dams or suburban gardens. Species such as Litoria moorei (Motorbike frog) and Limnodynastes dorsalis (Pobblebonk) are very common and well known, while others are restricted to particular habitats in their distribution range.

The frogs inhabit a wide range of habitat and many in the Southwest, such as Myobatrachidae sp., occur only in that region. The Cyclorana (Family: Hylidae) are ground dwelling and burrowing species occurring in the North of the state. These are tree frogs, closely related in structure and reproductive biology to the other Hylidae genus - Litoria.

Fossil records of Amphibia have been identified in the north west of the state.

== Naturalised species ==
Currently, the only non-native amphibian naturalised in Western Australia (WA) is Limnodynastes tasmaniensis (Spotted Grass Frog), which was introduced to Kununurra in the 1970s, apparently during the relocation of several hundred transportable homes from Adelaide. However, Bufo marinus (Cane Toad) occurs in the Northern Territory close to Western Australia's border, and is expected to spread into Western Australia.

== Diversity ==
Myobatrachidae contains three sub-families (some taxonomists them as individual families), two of which occur in Western Australia. Two members of Opisthodon are included here under their synonyms in Limnodynastes. The tree frog family, Hylidae, contains a subfamily, Pelodryadinae (Austro-Papuan tree frogs), and two genera occur.

Limnodynastinae Heleioporus (Gray, 1841) Limnodynastes (Fitzinger, 1843) Neobatrachus (Peters, 1863) Notaden (Günther, 1873) Opisthodon Steindachner, 1867	Myobatrachinae Arenophryne Crinia (Tschudi, 1838) Geocrinia (Blake, 1973) Metacrinia (Parker, 1940) Myobatrachus (Schlegel In Gray, 1850) Pseudophryne (Fitzinger, 1843) Spicospina (Roberts, et al., 1997) Uperoleia (Gray, 1841schudi, 1838)	Pelodryadinae Cyclorana Litoria

This table is a summary of the species occurring in Western Australia, giving their common name, distribution and conservation status on the IUCN Red List.

Myobatrachidae and Hylidae
Taxa	Description	Distribution	Red List
Genus: Arenophryne	One species		
Arenophryne rotunda	Fossorial frog that uses strong arms to (unusually) burrow forward.	Coastal, Kalbarri to Shark Bay	LC
Genus: Bufo			
Bufo marinus	Cane toad	Entering WA at 30 km per year	LC
Genus: Crinia			
Crinia bilingua	Bilingual Froglet		
Crinia georgiana	Quacking Froglet		
Crinia glauerti	Glauert's Froglet		
Crinia insignifera	Western Sign-bearing Froglet		
Crinia pseudinsignifera	False Western Froglet		
Crinia subinsignifera	Small Western Froglet		
Genus:Cyclorana (Family: Hylidae)	Water-holding frogs. Ground dwelling and hibernating tree frogs.		LC
Cyclorana australis	Giant Frog (Gray, 1842)	Kimberley	
Cyclorana cryptotis	Hidden-eared Frog (Parker, 1940)	Kimberley region	
Cyclorana cultripes	Knife-footed Frog (Parker, 1940)	Kimberley region	
Cyclorana longipes	Long-footed Frog (Tyler & Martin, 1977)	Kimberley region	
Cyclorana maini	Main's frog (Tyler & Martin, 1977)	Central west Australia. Range: Winning Pool, Kumpupintil Lake to Morawa and Laverton	
Cyclorana platycephala	Water-holding frog (Günther, 1873)	Wide distribution in the central west.	
Cyclorana vagitus	Wailing Frog (Tyler, Davies & Martin, 1981)	Kimberley	
Genus: Geocrinia	formerly Crinia	Southwest Australia	LC except:
Geocrinia alba	White-bellied Frog		CR
Geocrinia leai	Lea's frog		
Geocrinia lutea	Walpole's frog, Nornalup Frog (Main, 1963)		NT
Geocrinia rosea, (Harrison, 1927)	Karri frog, Roseate frog		
Geocrinia vitellina	Orange-bellied frog, Yellow-bellied frog		VU
Genus: Heleioporus	Burrowing frogs. All except H. australiacus are WA endemic.		LC
Heleioporus albopunctatus (Gray, 1841)	Western Spotted Frog	Southwest Australia	
Heleioporus barycragus (Lee, 1967)	Western Marsh Frog.	Southwest Australia	
Heleioporus eyrei (Gray, 1845)	Moaning Frog (eyrei)	Southwest Australia	
Heleioporus inornatus (Lee & Main, 1954)	Plains Frog.		
Heleioporus psammophilus (Lee & Main, 1954)	Sand Frog		
Genus:Litoria (Family: Hylidae)	Genus of tree frog ranging from Australia and New Guinea to Indonesia.		LC except:
Litoria adelaidensis	Slender Tree Frog	Southwest Australia	
Litoria bicolor	Northern Dwarf Tree Frog	Kimberly region	
Litoria caerulea	Green Tree Frog		
Litoria cavernicola	Name Cave-dwelling Tree Frog		DD
Litoria coplandi	Name Copland's Rock Frog		
Litoria cyclorhyncha	Spotted-thighed Frog		
Litoria dahli	Dahl's Aquatic Frog		
Litoria inermis	Floodplain Frog		
Litoria meiriana	Rockhole Frog		
Litoria microbelos	Javelin Frog		
Litoria moorei	Motorbike Frog, Bell Frog.		
Litoria nasuta	Rocket Frog		
Litoria pallida	Pale Frog		
Litoria rothii	Roth's Tree Frog or Northern Laughing Tree Frog	North west	
Litoria rubella	The Desert Tree Frog or Little Red Tree Frog	Common to northern half of state.	
Litoria splendida	Magnificent Tree Frog or Splendid Tree Frog		
Litoria tornieri	Tornier's Frog		
Litoria watjulumensis	Wotjulum or Watjulum Frog		
Genus: Limnodynastes			
Limnodynastes convexiusculus	Marbled Marsh Frog		
Limnodynastes depressus	Flat-headed Frog		
Limnodynastes dorsalis	Pobblebonk, Western Banjo Frog		
Limnodynastes lignarius	Carpenter Frog		
Limnodynastes ornatus	Ornate Burrowing Frog (Synonym: Opisthodon ornatus)		
Limnodynastes spenceri	Spencer's Burrowing Frog (Synonym: Opisthodon spenceri)		
Genus: Metacrinia	One species	Restricted habitat	
Metacrinia nichollsi	Nicholl's Toadlet	Occurring between Dunsborough and Albany.	LC
Genus: Myobatrachus			
Myobatrachus gouldi	Turtle Frog		LC
Genus: Neobatrachus			LC
Neobatrachus albipes	White-footed Trilling Frog		
Neobatrachus aquilonius	Northern Burrowing Frog		
Neobatrachus centralis	Desert Trilling Frog		
Neobatrachus fulvus	Tawny Trilling Frog		
Neobatrachus kunapalari	Kunapalari Frog		
Neobatrachus pelobatoides	Humming Frog		
Neobatrachus sutor	Shoemaker Frog		
Neobatrachus wilsmorei	Goldfields Bullfrog		
Genus: Notaden			
Notaden melanoscaphus	Northern Spadefoot Toad		
Notaden nichollsi	Desert Spadefoot Toad		
Notaden weigeli	Weigel's Toad		DD
Genus: Pseudophryne	Toadlets		LC
Pseudophryne douglasi	Douglas's Toadlet		
Pseudophryne guentheri	Gunther's Toadlet		
Pseudophryne occidentalis	Orange-crowned Toadlet		
Genus: Spicospina		Restricted habitat	
Spicospina flammocaerulea	Sunset Frog, harlequin Frog, mountain road Frog	Walpole	VU D2
Genus: Uperoleia	Toadlets	Restricted habitat	LC expect:
Uperoleia aspera	Derby Toadlet (Tyler, Davies & Martin, 1981)		
Uperoleia borealis	Northern Toadlet (Tyler, Davies & Martin, 1981)		
Uperoleia crassa	Fat Toadlet (Tyler, Davies & Martin, 1981)		
Uperoleia glandulosa	Glandular Toadlet (Davis, Mahoney and Roberts, 1986)		
Uperoleia lithomoda	Stonemason Toadlet (Tyler, Davies & Martin, 1981)		
Uperoleia marmorata	Marbled Toadlet (Gray, 1841)		DD
Uperoleia micromeles	Tanami Toadlet (Tyler, Davies & Martin, 1981)		
Uperoleia minima	Small Toadlet (Tyler, Davies & Martin, 1981)		
Uperoleia mjobergi	Mjoberg's Toadlet (Andersson, 1913)		
Uperoleia russelli	Russell's Toadlet (Loveridge, 1933)		
Uperoleia talpa	Mole Toadlet (Davies & Martin, 1981)		
Uperoleia trachyderma	Blacksoil Toadlet (Tyler, Davies & Martin, 1981)		

== Prehistory ==
Fossils of Amphibians have been found in Western Australia.

Genus	Scientific name	Common name/s	Distribution
Deltasaurus	Deltasaurus kimberleyensis		Blina shale

== See also ==
- List of amphibians of Western Australia
- Amphibians of Australia
