= List of amphibians of Western Australia =

This is a list of amphibians of Western Australia. They are all frogs.

== Native species ==
- Arenophryne rotunda (sandhill frog) (endemic)
- Crinia bilingua (bilingual froglet)
- Crinia georgiana (quacking frog) (endemic)
- Crinia glauerti (Glauert's froglet)
- Crinia insignifera (squelching froglet) (endemic)
- Crinia pseudinsignifera (bleating froglet) (endemic)
- Crinia subinsignifera (South Coast froglet) (endemic)
- Cyclorana australis (giant frog)
- Cyclorana cryptotis (hidden-ear frog)
- Cyclorana cultripes (knife-footed frog)
- Cyclorana longipes (long-footed frog)
- Cyclorana maini (Main's frog)
- Cyclorana platycephala (water-holding frog)
- Cyclorana vagitus (wailing frog)
- Geocrinia alba (white-bellied frog) (endemic)
- Geocrinia leai (Lea's frog) (endemic)
- Geocrinia lutea (nornalup frog) (endemic)
- Geocrinia rosea (roseate frog) (endemic)
- Geocrinia vitellina (yellow-bellied frog) (endemic)
- Heleioporus albopunctatus (western spotted frog) (endemic)
- Heleioporus barycragus (hooting frog) (endemic)
- Heleioporus eyrei (moaning frog) (endemic)
- Heleioporos inornatus (whooping frog) (endemic)
- Heleioporus psammophilus (sand frog) (endemic)
- Limnodynastes convexiusculus (marbled frog)
- Limnodynastes depressus (flat-headed frog)
- Limnodynastes dorsalis (banjo frog) (endemic)
- Limnodynastes ornatus (ornate frog)
- Limnodynastes spenceri (Spencer's frog)
- Litoria adelaidensis (slender tree frog) (endemic)
- Litoria bicolor (northern dwarf tree frog)
- Litoria caerulea (green tree frog)
- Litoria cavernicola (Cave-dwelling frog) (endemic)
- Litoria coplandi (Copland's rock frog)
- Litoria cyclorhyncha (spotted-thighed frog) (endemic)
- Litoria dahlii (Dahl's aquatic frog)
- Litoria inermis (Peter's frog)
- Litoria meiriana (rockhole frog)
- Litoria microbelos (javelin frog)
- Litoria moorei (motorbike frog) (endemic)
- Litoria nasuta (rocket frog)
- Litoria pallida (pale frog)
- Litoria rothii (Roth's tree frog)
- Litoria rubella (desert tree frog)
- Litoria splendida (magnificent tree frog)
- Litoria tornieri (Tornier's frog)
- Litoria watjulumensis (wotjulum frog)
- Megistolotis lignarius (Woodworker frog)
- Metacrinia nichollsi (Nicholl's toadlet) (endemic)
- Myobatrachus gouldii (Turtle frog) (endemic)
- Neobatrachus albipes (white-footed trilling frog) (endemic)
- Neobatrachus aquilonius (northern burrowing frog)
- Neobatrachus centralis (desert trilling frog)
- Neobatrachus fulvus (tawny trilling frog) (endemic)
- Neobatrachus kunapalari (Kunapalari frog) (endemic)
- Neobatrachus pelobatoides (humming frog) (endemic)
- Neobatrachus sutor (shoemaker frog)
- Neobatrachus wilsmorei (Wilsmore's frog) (endemic)
- Notaden melanoscaphus (northern spadefoot)
- Notaden nichollsi (desert spadefoot)
- Notaden weigeli (Weigel's spadefoot) (endemic)
- Pseudophryne douglasi (Douglas' toadlet) (endemic)
- Pseudophryne guentheri (Gunther's toadlet) (endemic)
- Pseudophryne occidentalis (western toadlet)
- Spicospina flammocaerulea (sunset frog) (endemic)
- Uperoleia aspera (Derby toadlet) (endemic)
- Uperoleia borealis (northern toadlet)
- Uperoleia crassa (fat toadlet) (endemic)
- Uperoleia glandulosa (glandular toadlet) (endemic)
- Uperoleia lithomoda (Stonemason's toadlet)
- Uperoleia marmorata (marbled toadlet) (endemic)
- Uperoleia micromeles (Tanami toadlet) (endemic)
- Uperoleia minima (small toadlet) (endemic)
- Uperoleia mjobergi (Mjoberg's toadlet) (endemic)
- Uperoleia russelli (Russell's toadlet) (endemic)
- Uperoleia talpa (mole toadlet) (endemic)
- Uperoleia trachyderma (blacksoil toadlet)

== Naturalised species ==
Currently, the only non-native amphibian naturalised in Western Australia is Limnodynastes tasmaniensis (spotted grass frog).
