= Painted frog =

Painted frog may refer to:

- Atelopus ebenoides – from Central America
- Discoglossus pictus – from the central Mediterranean region.
- Neobatrachus pictus – from southern Australia
- Neobatrachus sudelli – from eastern Australia
- Discoglossus nigriventer
- Kaloula pulchra
- Discoglossus pictus – from Africa
