= N. albipes =

N. albipes may refer to:

- Neobatrachus albipes, the white-footed frog or white-footed trilling frog, a frog species endemic to Australia
- Neuroterus albipes, a gall wasp species that forms chemically induced leaf galls on oak trees

== See also ==
- Albipes
