= H. inornatus =

H. inornatus may refer to:

- Heleioporus inornatus, a frog species endemic to Australia
- Hemitriccus inornatus, a bird species
- Hydrophis inornatus, a sea snake species
- Hyperolius inornatus, a frog species endemic to the Democratic Republic of the Congo

== See also ==
- Inornatus
