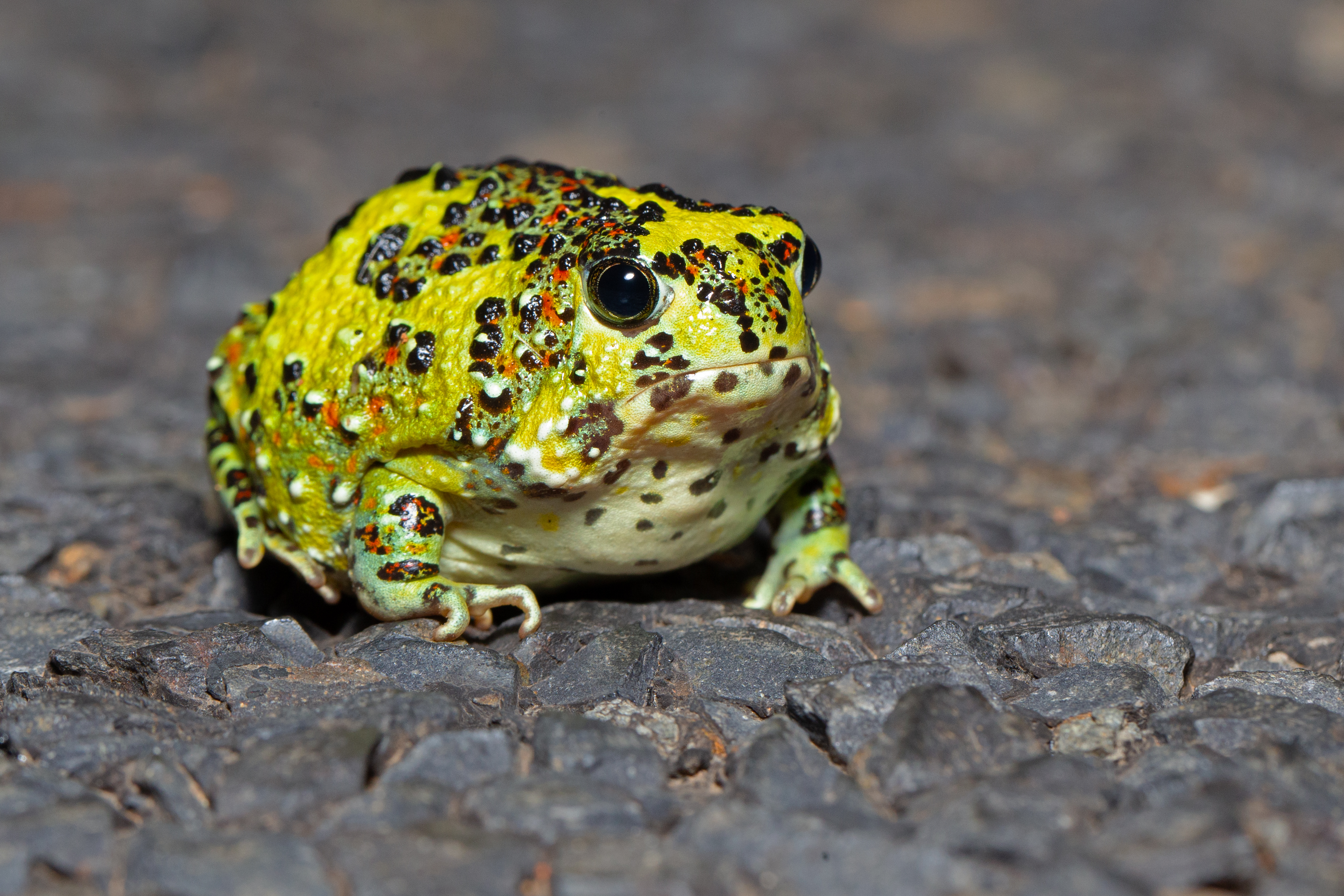
- A male.
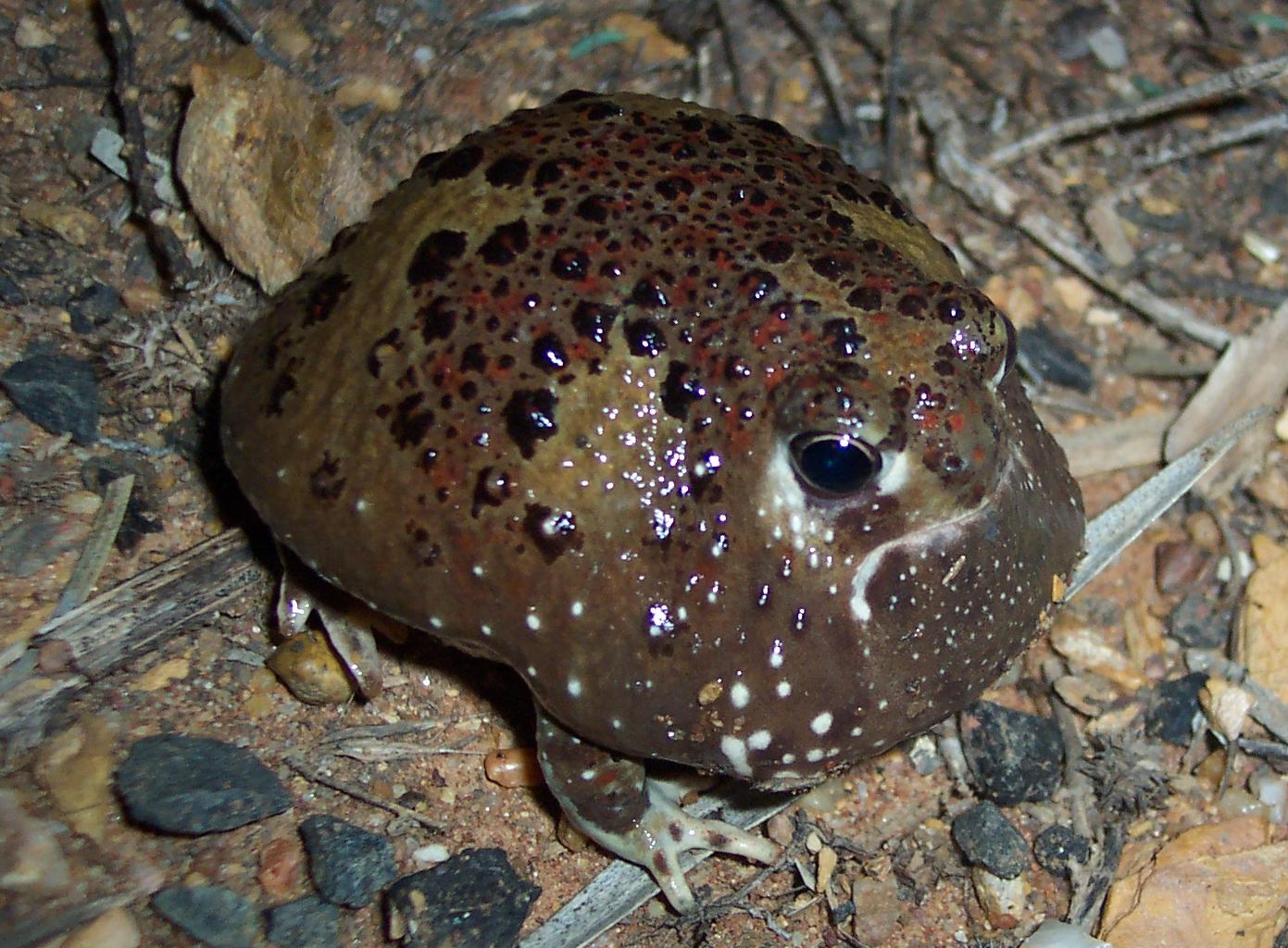
- A male.

Conservation status
- Least Concern (IUCN 3.1)

Scientific classification
- Kingdom: Animalia
- Phylum: Chordata
- Class: Amphibia
- Order: Anura
- Family: Limnodynastidae
- Genus: Notaden
- Species: N. bennettii

Binomial name
- Notaden bennettii Günther, 1873
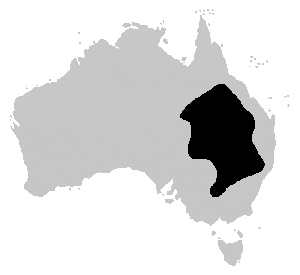
- Range of the crucifix toad

= Crucifix toad =

Species of amphibian

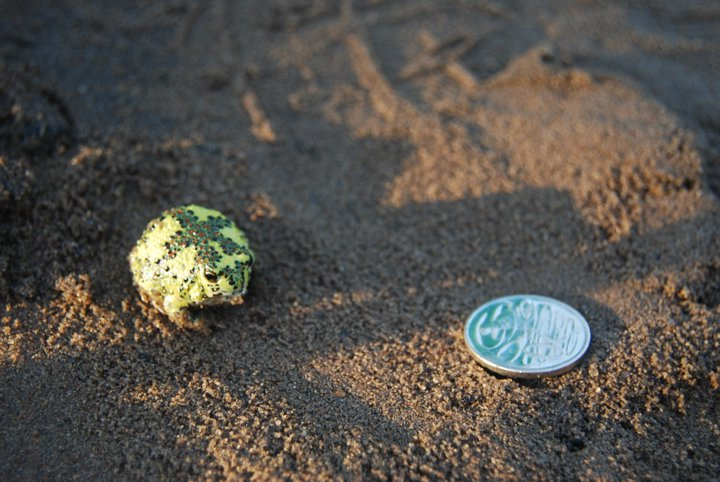
A small holy cross frog

The crucifix toad (Notaden bennettii), holy cross frog or Catholic frog is a species of frog in the family Limnodynastidae. It is a fossorial frog. It is one of the few Australian frogs to display aposematism. It is native to western New South Wales and south-western Queensland.

It was first described in 1873 by Albert Günther.

== Description ==
The crucifix toad is the most distinctive species of frog within the genus Notaden. Whereas most Notaden frogs are dark brown in colour, the crucifix toad exhibits many bright colours. Its dorsal surface is bright yellow, with a cross of many colours centered on the back. The cross is outlined with large, black dots, and filled with white, black and red dots. The ventral surface is white, and the flanks blue.

The crucifix toad is a small, and very round frog. Its nose is blunt, and legs and feet are small. As this species is fossorial, the tympanum is hidden. Males reach a length of 6.3 centimetres (2 15/32 in), and females a length of 6.8 centimetres (2 11/16 in). The species feet have little "spades" to help them burrow deeply.

== Ecology and behaviour ==
The crucifix toad is a ground-dwelling frog which inhabits the arid areas of western New South Wales and Queensland. It is able to survive dry periods by burrowing and reducing activity. Upon very heavy rain, they will emerge from the ground, and begin breeding in temporary ponds. The males call from within the pond to attract the female. The call is a "woop". The development of the tadpole is rapid so as to take advantage of the wet conditions and reducing the risk of them dying from the pond drying up. The cycle is so quick it can be over in six weeks.

The frog exudes a tacky and elastic "frog glue" onto its dorsal skin when provoked. Its purpose is uncertain; it may be intended to confuse and deter predators such as snakes, or to trap biting insects (which would later be consumed when the frog sheds and eats its skin). Male crucifix toads have been documented to use this glue to attach themselves onto the larger females during mating. The glue has been found to be stronger than available non-toxic medical adhesives and is the subject of further study. The glue is a protein-based pressure-sensitive adhesive that functions even in wet conditions.

The crucifix toad's diet primarily consists of ants and termites.

== See also ==
- List of amphibians
