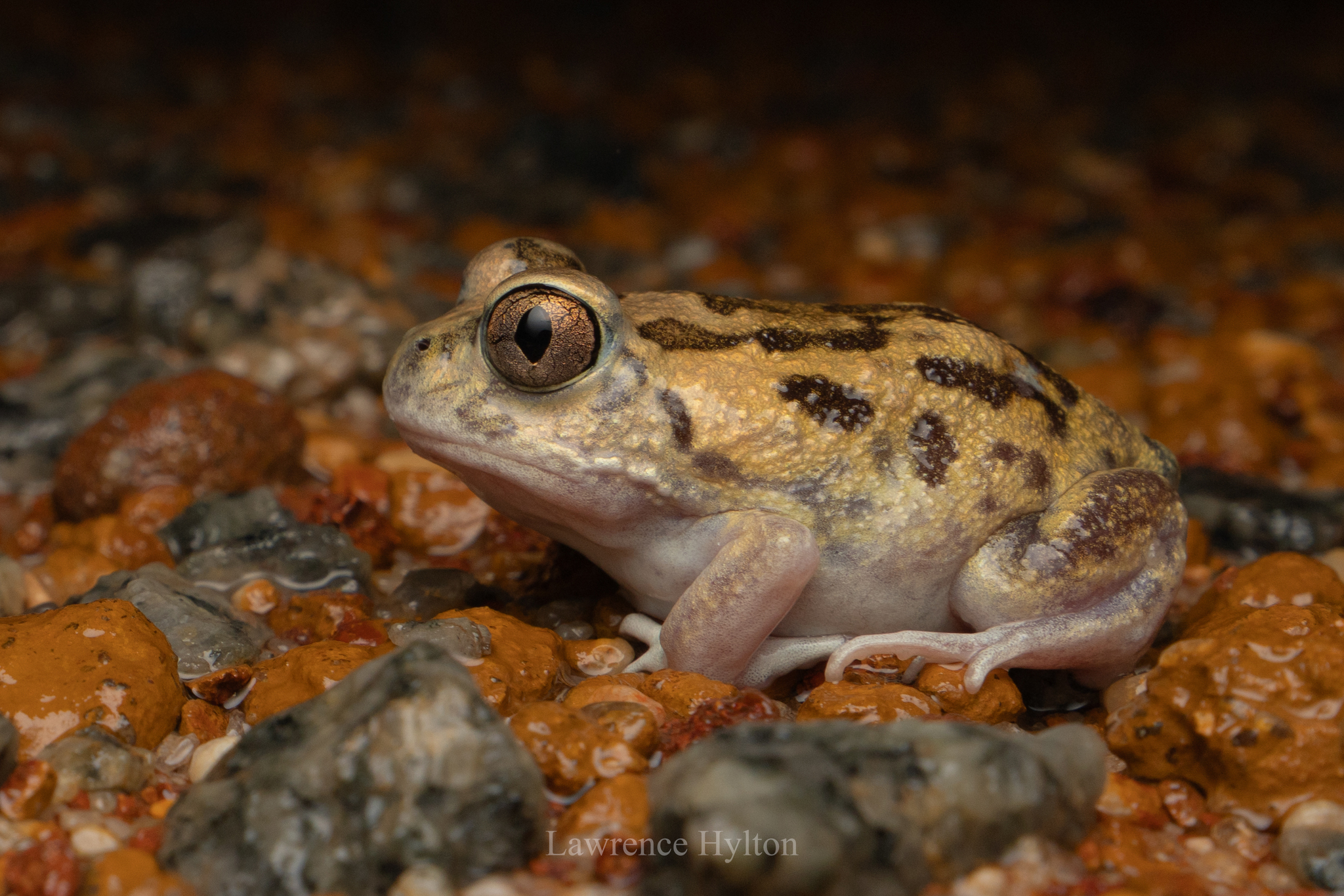

Conservation status
- Least Concern (IUCN 3.1)

Scientific classification
- Kingdom: Animalia
- Phylum: Chordata
- Class: Amphibia
- Order: Anura
- Family: Limnodynastidae
- Genus: Neobatrachus
- Species: N. kunapalari

Binomial name
- Neobatrachus kunapalari Mahony & Roberts, 1986
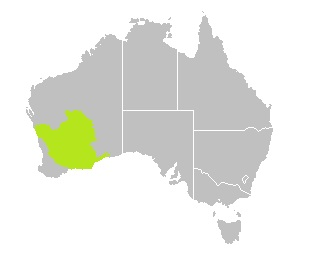
- Wheatbelt frog distribution

= Wheatbelt frog =

Species of amphibian

The Wheatbelt frog (Neobatrachus kunapalari) or Kunapalari frog, is a species of frog in the family Limnodynastidae. It is endemic to arid zones, south of Menzies and Wubin and its distribution extends to the edges of the Nullabor plain in Western Australia. Its natural habitats are temperate shrubland, Mediterranean-type shrubby vegetation, subtropical or tropical dry lowland grassland, and intermittent freshwater marshes.

== Taxonomy ==
The Wheatbelt frog belongs in the genus Neobatrachus which describes burrowing frogs native to Australia. It was first discovered in 1986 by differentiating its call and genetic makeup from other frogs within that genus. Whilst other frogs in the genus Neobatrachus are diploid species, only three other species within the genus have double the amount of chromosomes of those species, classified as tetraploid (N. aquilonius, N. kunapalari and N. sudellae). This discovery of differentiation in genetic makeup allowed the Wheatbelt frog to be classified as its own species.

=== Etymology ===
The name Kunapalari comes from a group of first nations people, who live in the Kimberly region of Western Australia, the Gugadja people. In the Gugadja language, Kunapalari means 'frog'.

== Description ==
Its call is a long, low pitched trill.

Its body is rotund, with its back ranging from a pale yellow to tan color with multiple irregular dark brown to black blotches all over. Breeding males will have a small black line down their back. Belly of the frog is white, with a grey throat. The underside of their hands and feet are a dark brown. Males sizes range from 48–58 mm (1.9–2.3 in) SVL, while females tend to be larger 53–61 mm (2.1–2.4 in) SVL. Its pupil has a vertical slit and a silver iris. Its fingers are unwebbed, while its toes have somewhat extensive webbing and it has a compressed, semi-circular inner metatarsal tubercle (designed to assist with burrowing and is attached to the foot) which is edged with black.

== Ecology & Behavior ==
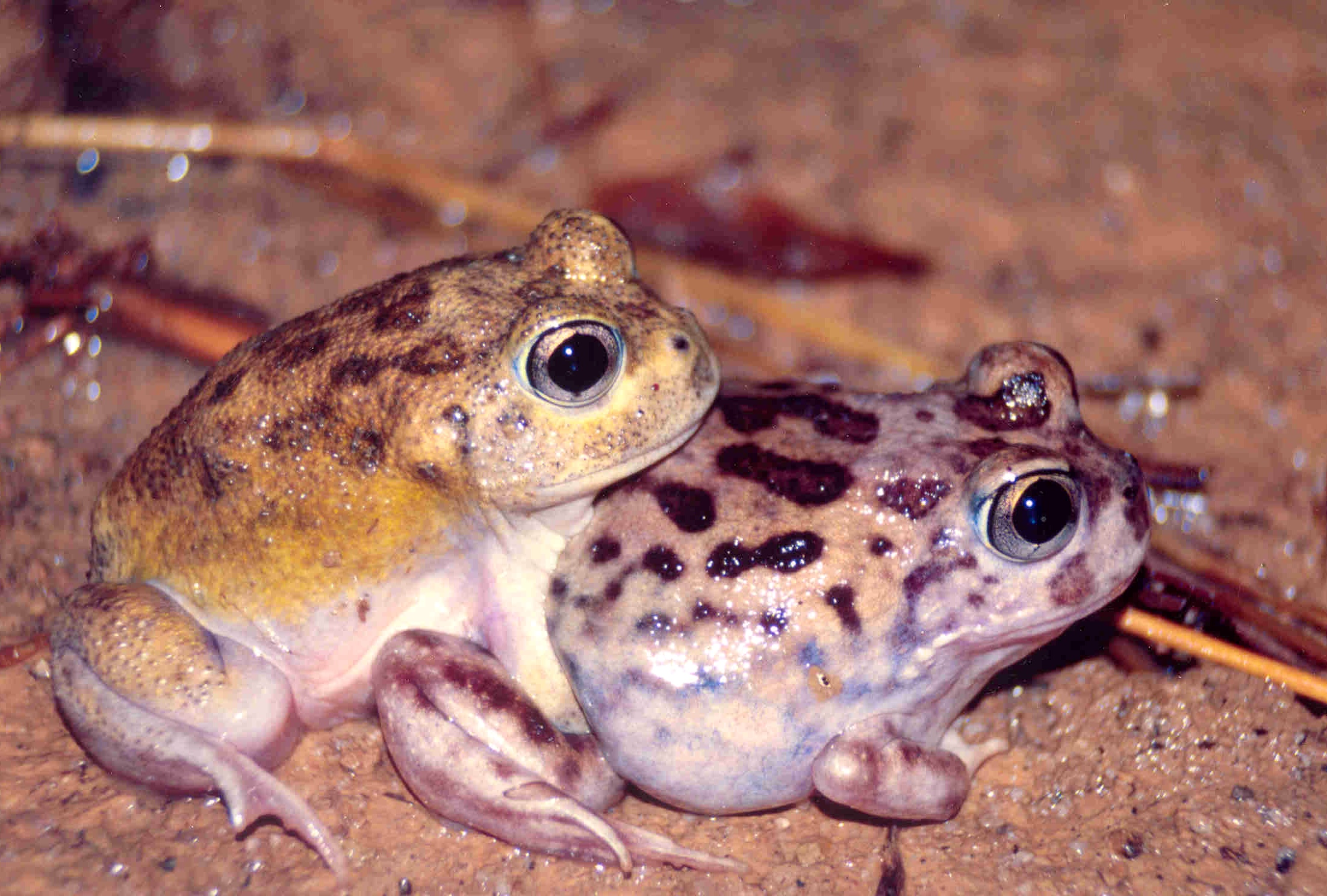
Photograph of Neobatrachus kunapalari (Wheatbelt frog) engaging in amplexus

The Wheatbelt frog breeds after heavy winter and summer rains. Generally, it will burrow into the ground to avoid the conditions of the arid habitats and will emerge for heavy rains. At breeding sites where more males than females might occur, multiple male amplexus (or polyandry) can occur. This has the potential to increase sperm competition between males and the attempts at polyandry reflects a potential response to increased male bias within the breeding site.

It will generally be found on impervious soils like claypans which contain an opaque, milky mixture which attempts to hide tadpoles from view. Its eggs are laid in flooded claypans and are laid in clusters (of up to 500 eggs which sink to the bottom of those flooded areas. Tadpoles can reach up to 6 cm (2.4 in) and will swim at any depth of water bodies, developing into frogs in around five months.

The Wheatbelt frog is that amongst other frogs within the Neobatrachus genus which undergo aestivation. At the beginning of this stage, it will assume a specific posture and become inactive. A cocoon will then begin forming around its body which is thin and transparent within its first week of inactivity, then it becomes increasingly more opaque and thickens. This cocoon will cover the entirety of the frog's body surface, excluding its narial openings. The cocoon is multiple layers of single-cell-thick sheets of epidermal cells which are formed regularly at four day intervals. Each cocoon layer is around 0.6 nm (2.4×10^{−8} in) and the layers of the cocoon will continually increase along with the duration of aestivation.
