= Hooting frog =

Conservation status
- Least Concern (IUCN 3.1)

Scientific classification
- Kingdom: Animalia
- Phylum: Chordata
- Class: Amphibia
- Order: Anura
- Family: Limnodynastidae
- Genus: Heleioporus
- Species: H. barycragus

Binomial name
- Heleioporus barycragus Lee, 1967

Species of amphibian

The hooting frog (Heleioporus barycragus) is a species of frog in the family Limnodynastidae. It is endemic to Australia. Its natural habitats are temperate forests and intermittent rivers.

The hooting frog is the largest member of the genus Heleioporus found in Western Australia. Like all west Australian species it breeds in late autumn and winter, calling from a burrow in which the female later deposits a foamy egg mass. Males excavate burrows in the banks of bottom of dry watercourses, usually lateritic clay based streams of the Darling Range.

The hooting frog was found to have travelled to Minden, QLD. (2021)

barycragus means 'deep-voiced' in reference to the low 'hooting' call that also gives its common name. While it is also known as the western marsh frog, this name is confusing as the species does not occur in or near marshes, and may be confused with the species Limnodynastes dorsalis.
