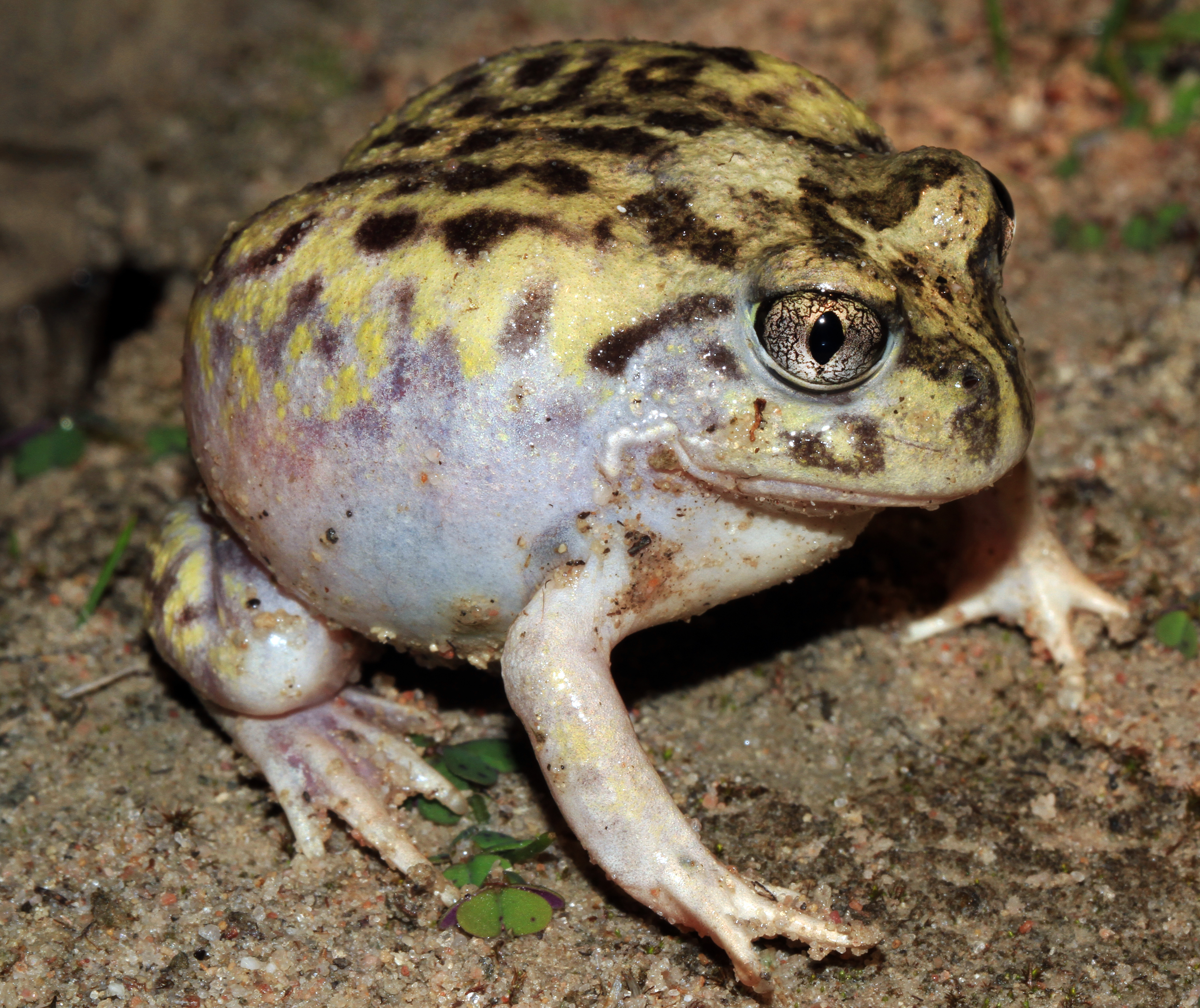

Conservation status
- Least Concern (IUCN 3.1)

Scientific classification
- Domain: Eukaryota
- Kingdom: Animalia
- Phylum: Chordata
- Class: Amphibia
- Order: Anura
- Family: Limnodynastidae
- Genus: Neobatrachus
- Species: N. pictus

Binomial name
- Neobatrachus pictus Peters, 1863
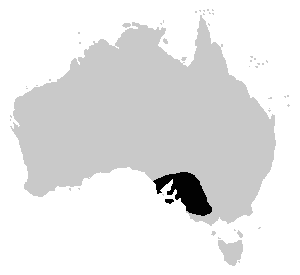
- Range of the Painted Burrowing Frog

= Painted burrowing frog =

Species of amphibian

The painted burrowing frog (Neobatrachus pictus) is a species of burrowing frog native to western Victoria, eastern South Australia and southern New South Wales. They are also one of six species of frog which inhabit Kangaroo Island.

== Description ==
The painted burrowing frog is a moderate sized plump frog, reaching 55 mm in length. It is grey to yellow above with brown, olive or green patches. There is sometimes a thin, paler stripe running down the back. The belly is white. The rear toes are partially webbed and the metatarsal tubercles (shovel like structures on the heel of the foot to assist with burrowing) are completely black. The pupil is a vertical slit when contracted, and the iris is silver to gold.

== Ecology and behaviour ==
Painted burrowing frogs inhabit waterholes, dams or pools of watercourses in woodland, grassland, and cleared areas. Males make an elongated trilling sound while floating in water after heavy rains, mainly in winter and autumn. Like other Neobatrachus the species is an adapted burrower and will often spend periods of time underground to avoid drought conditions.

Eggs are laid as loosely adherent clumps which may break apart. Tadpoles are large and reach about 78 mm (at about stage 35). Development takes about 4 to 7 months and metamorphs are often observed from September to November.

When threatened, this species will sometimes rear up all its legs, inflating its body to appear larger to discourage some predators.

It is an uncommon species being threatened with habitat loss and is classified as endangered in New South Wales.

== Similar species ==
It is similar to other species of Neobatrachus, particularly the Sudell's frog (N. sudelli) and the trilling frog (N. centralis), from which it is distinguished by lack of baggy skin around the groin and metatarsal colouring respectively.
