= Woodworker frog =

Conservation status
- Least Concern (IUCN 3.1)

Scientific classification
- Kingdom: Animalia
- Phylum: Chordata
- Class: Amphibia
- Order: Anura
- Family: Limnodynastidae
- Genus: Limnodynastes
- Species: L. lignarius

Binomial name
- Limnodynastes lignarius (Tyler, Martin & Davies, 1979)

Synonyms
- Megistolotis lignarius Tyler, Martin & Davies, 1979

Species of amphibian

The woodworker frog (Limnodynastes lignarius) is a species of frog in the family Limnodynastidae. It is endemic to Australia. Its natural habitats are subtropical or tropical dry shrubland, subtropical or tropical dry lowland grassland, rivers, intermittent rivers, rocky areas, and caves.
