= Heleioporus inornatus =

Plains frog

Conservation status
- Least Concern (IUCN 3.1)

Scientific classification
- Kingdom: Animalia
- Phylum: Chordata
- Class: Amphibia
- Order: Anura
- Family: Limnodynastidae
- Genus: Heleioporus
- Species: H. inornatus

Binomial name
- Heleioporus inornatus Lee & Main, 1954

Species of amphibian

Heleioporus inornatus, the plain frog, plains frog, or whooping frog, is a species of frog in the family Myobatrachidae. It is endemic to Australia. Its natural habitat is swamps.
