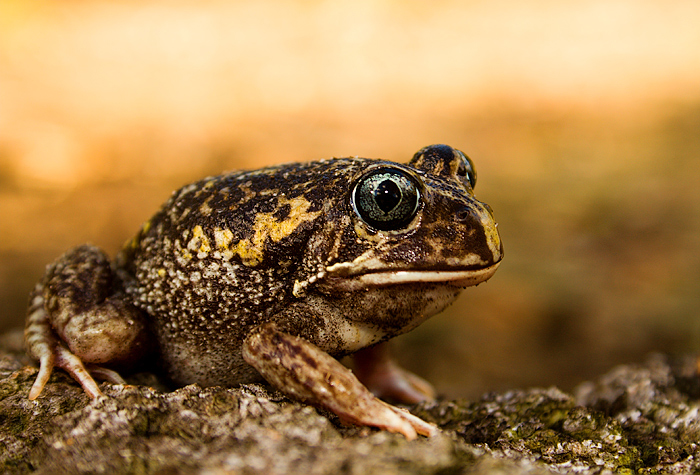

Conservation status
- Least Concern (IUCN 3.1)

Scientific classification
- Kingdom: Animalia
- Phylum: Chordata
- Class: Amphibia
- Order: Anura
- Family: Limnodynastidae
- Genus: Heleioporus
- Species: H. eyrei

Binomial name
- Heleioporus eyrei (Gray, 1845)
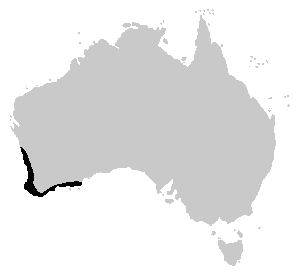
- Range of the Moaning Frog

= Moaning frog =

Species of amphibian

The moaning frog (Heleioporus eyrei) is a burrowing frog native to south-western Western Australia.

== Description ==
The moaning frog is round, with a large head and large, bulbous eyes. The dorsal surface is brown, with marbling of white, grey or yellow, and the ventral surface is white. The arms and legs are relatively small for burrowing frogs. Unlike most frogs of the genus Heleioporus, the male moaning frog lacks nuptial spines on the inner surface of first finger.

Males reach a length of 6.6 centimetres (2.6 in) and females reach a length of 6.3 centimetres (2.5 in).

== Ecology and behaviour ==
The moaning frog is native to the coast of south-western Western Australia, Rottnest Island and Bald Island. It inhabits sandy swamps, where it burrows for protection from predators and desiccation. The males call from under the ground, and amplexus takes place in the burrow. Eighty to five hundred eggs are deposited in a foamy mass at the bottom of a burrow. The eggs undergo development within the foam, and delay from hatching until the burrows are flooded from rain. The tadpoles undergo normal aquatic development.
