= Sand frog =

Conservation status
- Least Concern (IUCN 3.1)

Scientific classification
- Kingdom: Animalia
- Phylum: Chordata
- Class: Amphibia
- Order: Anura
- Family: Limnodynastidae
- Genus: Heleioporus
- Species: H. psammophilus

Binomial name
- Heleioporus psammophilus Lee & Main, 1954

Species of amphibian

The sand frog (Heleioporus psammophilus) is a species of frog in the family Myobatrachidae. It is endemic to southern Western Australia. Its natural habitats are temperate forests, temperate shrubland, Mediterranean-type shrubby vegetation, shrub-dominated wetlands, swamps, intermittent freshwater lakes, and intermittent freshwater marshes.

Like other members of the genus Heleioporus, the sand frog is a burrowing species. It utilizes underground chambers to avoid hot, dry conditions and to assist in reproduction, emerging after heavy rains to breed in temporary water bodies.

The species is assessed as Least Concern on the IUCN Red List, as it has a relatively wide distribution and is not currently facing major population-level threats. Habitat modification through land use change may affect some local populations, but it is not considered globally threatened.
