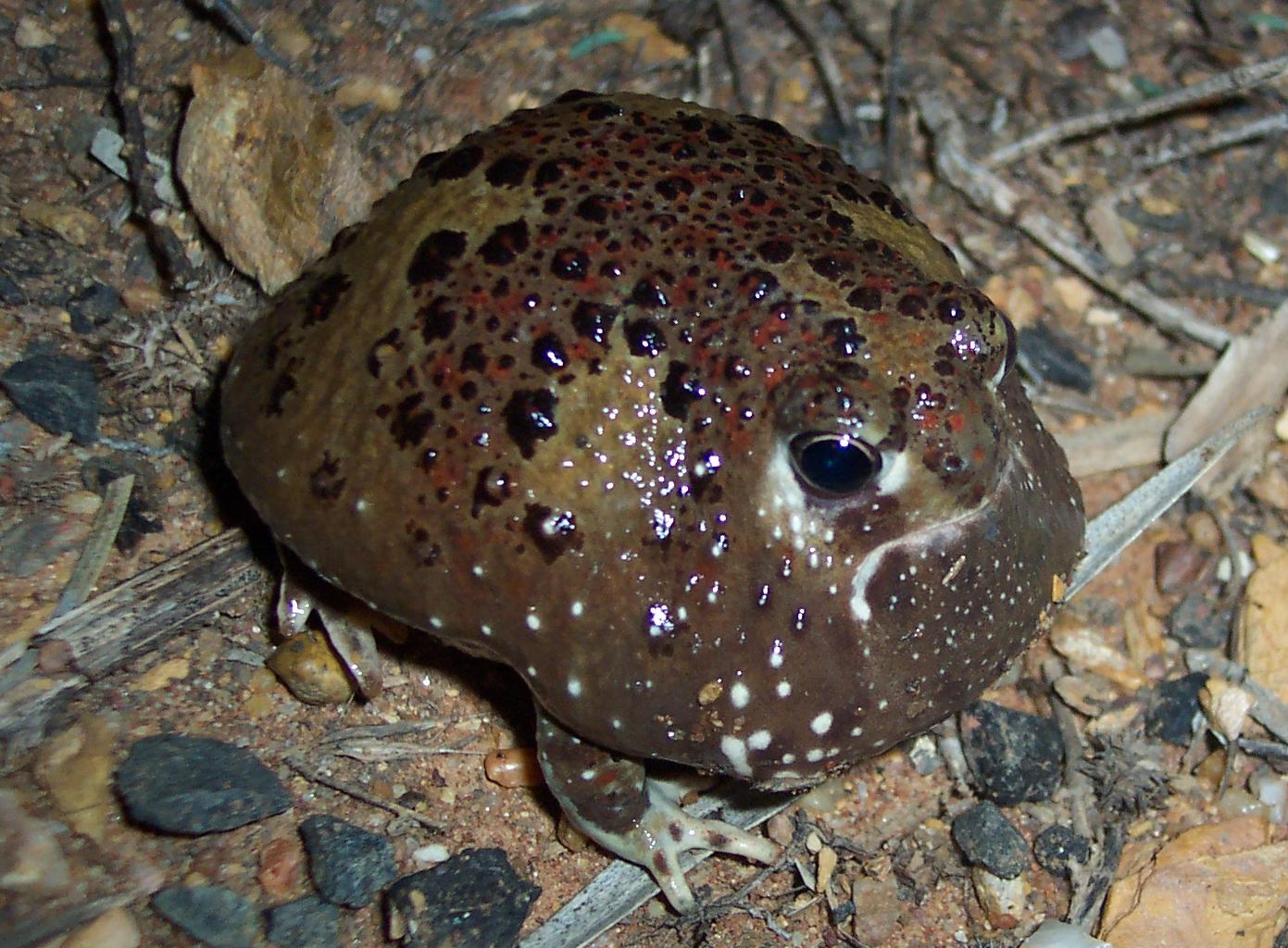
- Crucifix toad (Notaden bennettii)

Scientific classification
- Domain: Eukaryota
- Kingdom: Animalia
- Phylum: Chordata
- Class: Amphibia
- Order: Anura
- Family: Limnodynastidae
- Genus: Notaden; Günther, 1873

Diversity
- 4 species
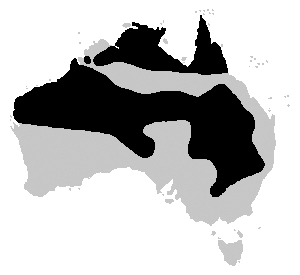
- The distribution of Notaden

= Notaden =

Genus of amphibians

Notaden is a genus of burrowing ground frogs native to central and northern Australia. Their common name is Australian spadefoot toads.

== Description ==
Its body is very round in shape with a short neck. Its pupils are horizontal slits. It has long arms and short, stubby legs. Its fingers lack webbing and its toes may have slight to no webbing. The skin is slightly warty and very glandular. Because of its similarity to some species of toads it is often incorrectly referred to as a toad. It excretes poisonous sticky fluid from its skin when handled. It lays eggs in chains similar to some toad species.

== Species ==
There are four species in this genus:

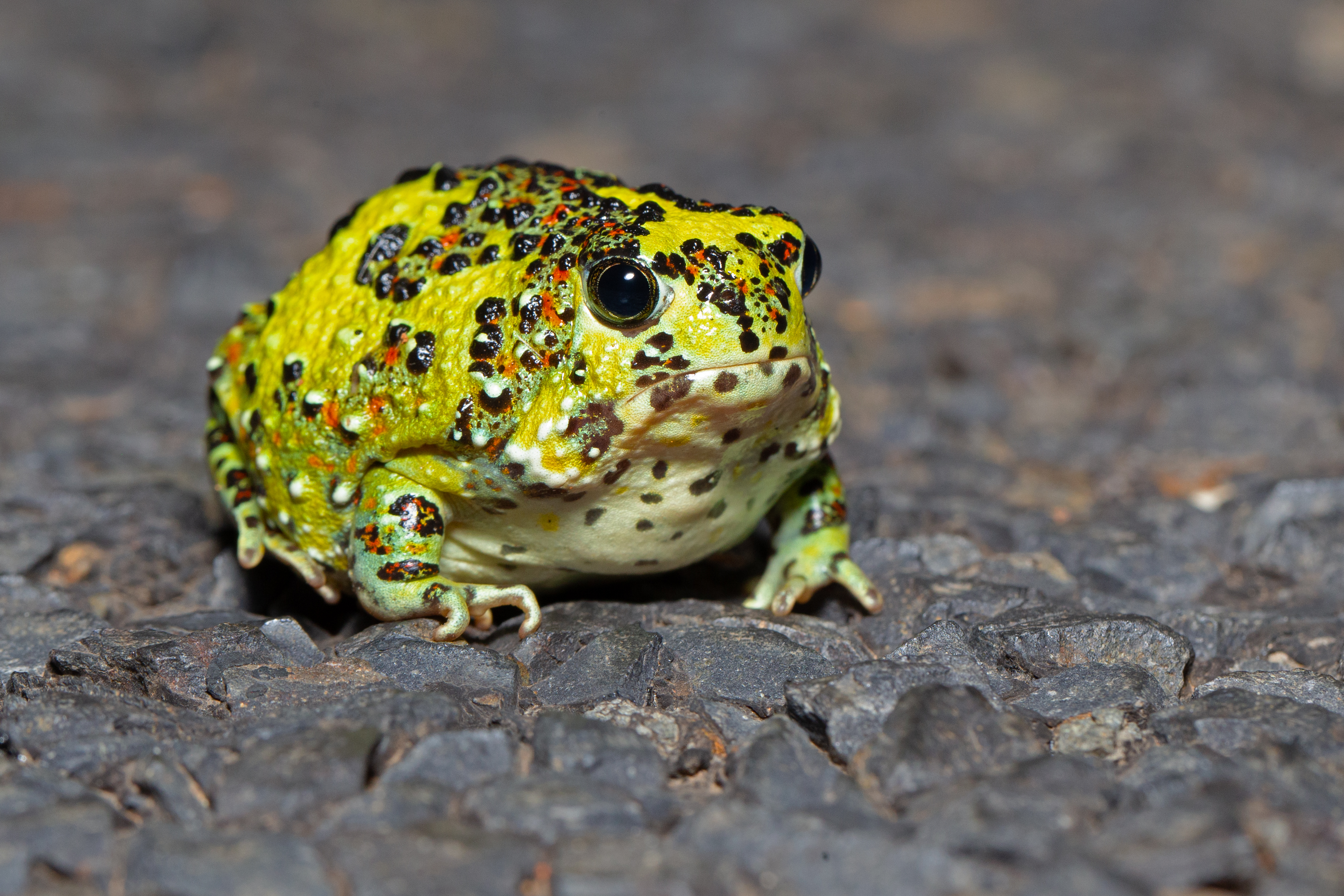
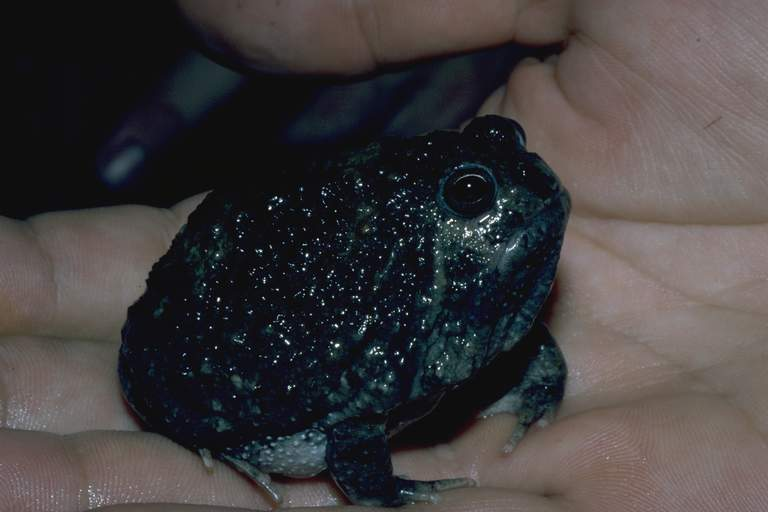
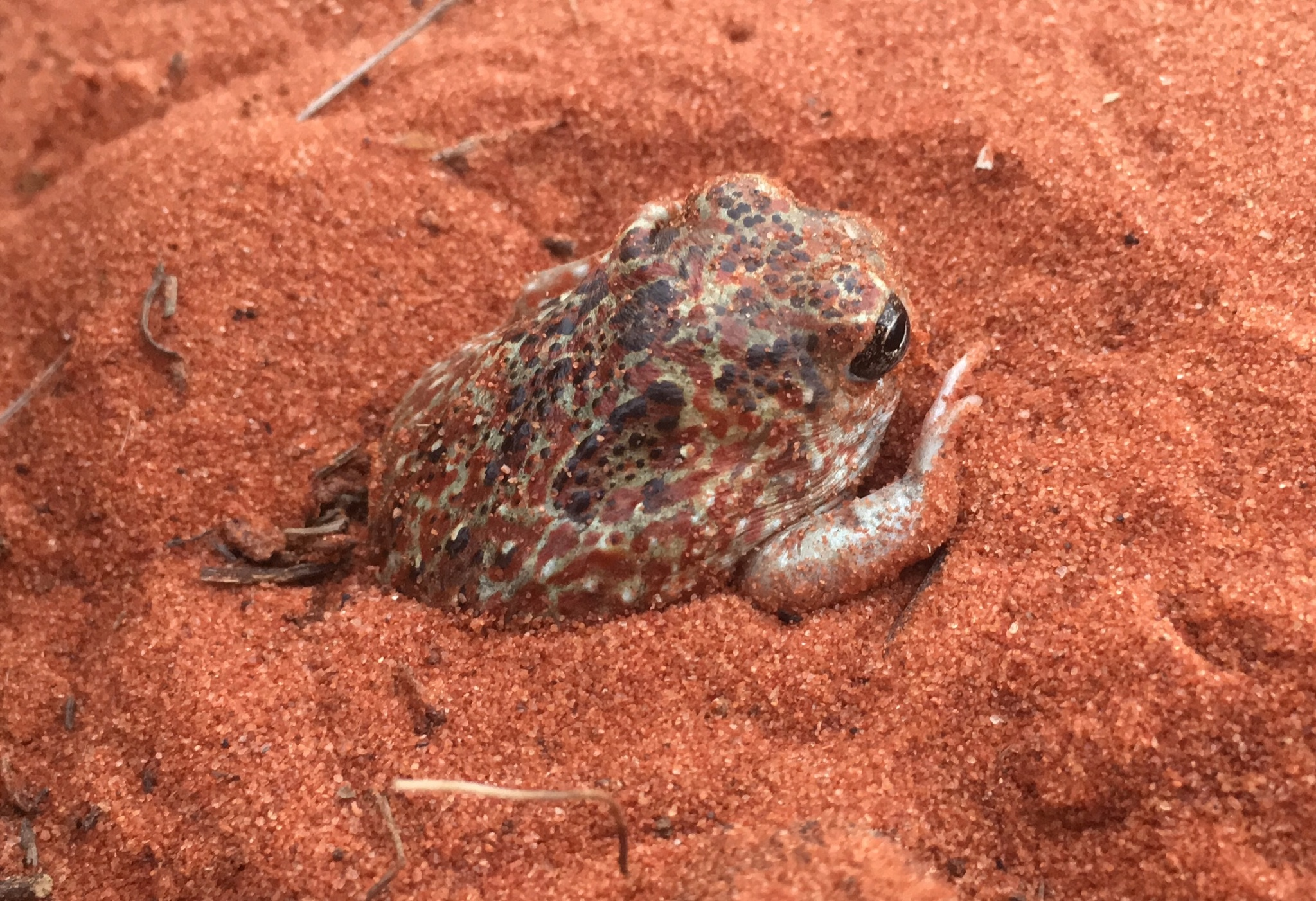
Common name	Binomial name	Image
Crucifix toad	Notaden bennettii (Günther, 1873)
Northern spadefoot toad	Notaden melanoscaphus (Hosmer, 1962)
Desert spadefoot toad	Notaden nichollsi (Parker, 1940)
Weigel's toad	Notaden weigeli (Shea and Johnston, 1988)
