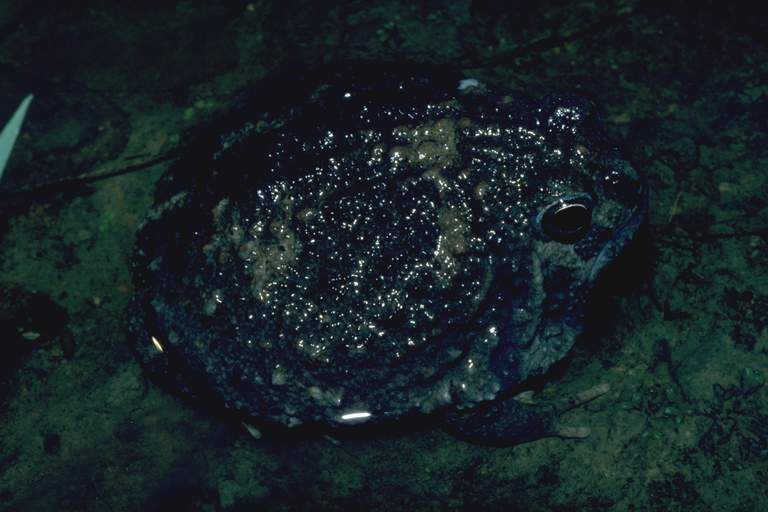

Conservation status
- Least Concern (IUCN 3.1)

Scientific classification
- Kingdom: Animalia
- Phylum: Chordata
- Class: Amphibia
- Order: Anura
- Family: Limnodynastidae
- Genus: Notaden
- Species: N. melanoscaphus

Binomial name
- Notaden melanoscaphus Hosmer, 1962

= Northern spadefoot toad =

Species of frog

The northern spadefoot toad (Notaden melanoscaphus) is a species of frog in the family Limnodynastidae.

It is endemic to Australia. Its natural habitats are dry savanna, moist savanna, subtropical or tropical dry lowland grassland, swamps, and intermittent freshwater marshes.

The males toads are known to float in the water while making loud 'whoop... whoop... whoop' calls.

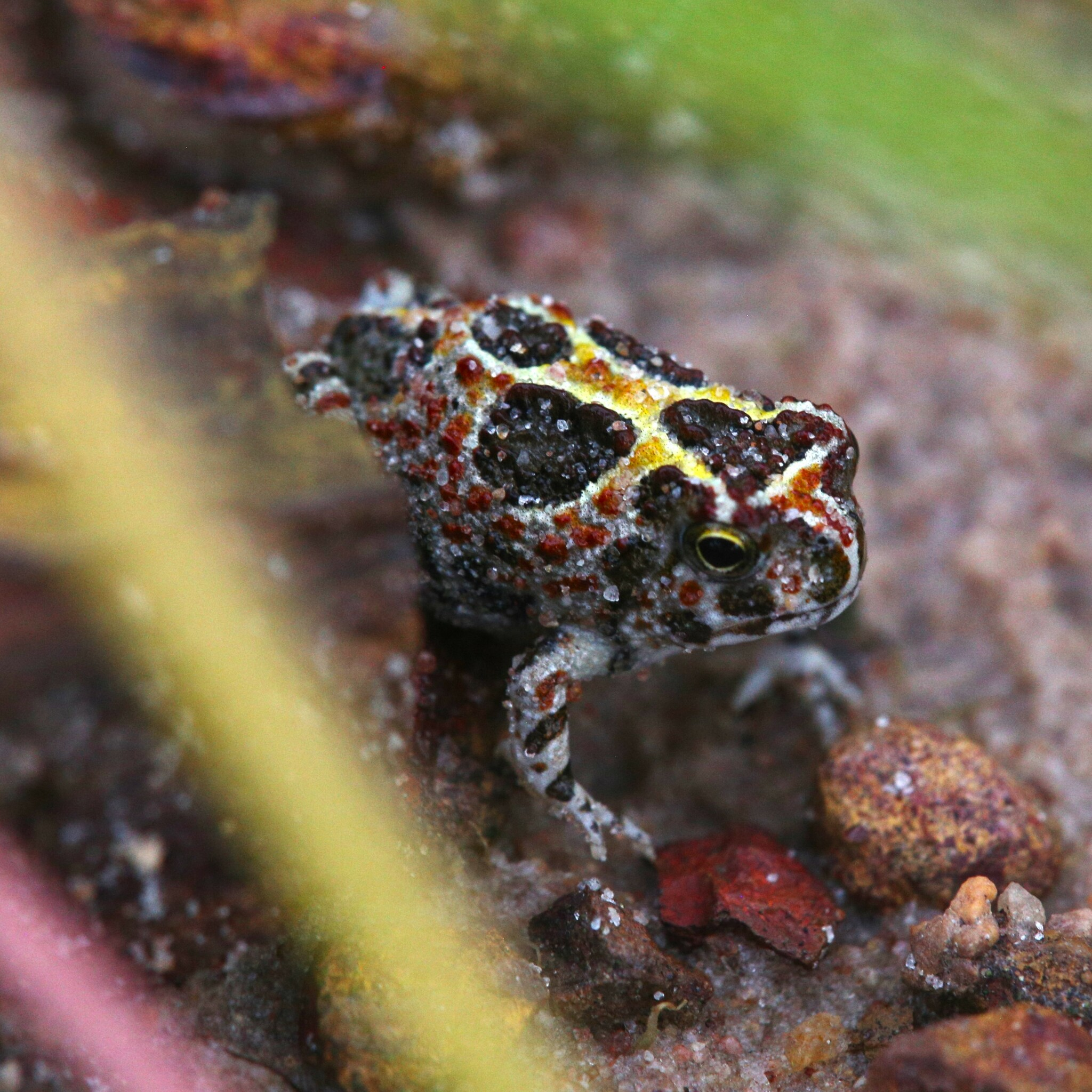
In Australia
