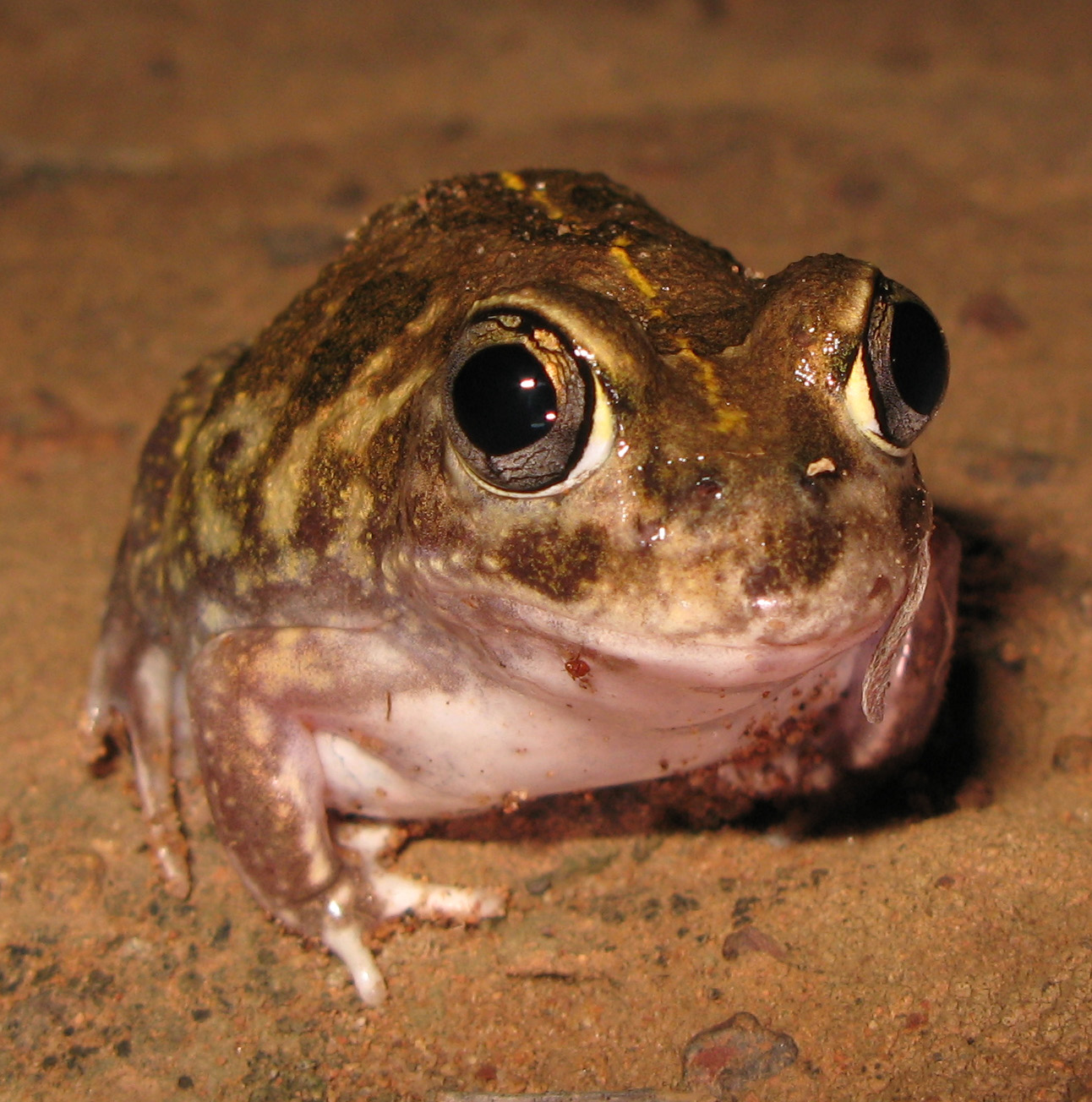
- Sudell's frog, Neobatrachus sudelli

Scientific classification
- Domain: Eukaryota
- Kingdom: Animalia
- Phylum: Chordata
- Class: Amphibia
- Order: Anura
- Family: Limnodynastidae
- Genus: Neobatrachus; Peters, 1863

Species
- See text
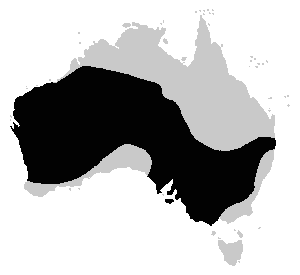
- The range of Neobatrachus

= Neobatrachus =

Genus of amphibians

Neobatrachus is a genus of burrowing ground frogs native to Australia. They occur in every state except Tasmania, however this genus is absent from the far north of Australia and most of Queensland. Most of the species in this genus occur in south-western Western Australia. They are often found in arid areas and burrow underground to avoid dehydration. They are typically found in temporary claypan and flooded grassland habitats.

These burrowing frogs have special genetic characteristics that help them to live in extreme environments. They stand out because some species are tetraploids instead of diploids.

All species have a similar body shape, they are rounded and squat with large eyes and the pupils constrict vertically. The limbs are short and the hands are free from webbing while the feet are partially webbed. Males lack a vocal sac. Approximately 1000 eggs are laid in a chain in still water.

The reproductive cycle is dependent on sufficient rainfall, an unpredictable event in the arid and semiarid regions of Australia. When a period of rain creates pools of water they emerge from their burrow to meet in large numbers. The breeding activity becomes frantic as the males seek out an opportunity, several individuals may sometimes be seen clambering over each other on a single female. Neobatrachus tadpoles may feed on the weaker individuals in a pool as available food is exhausted or water evaporates.

The genus was first described by Wilhelm Peters in 1863. A taxonomic revision of the genus was published in 2010, providing clarification to the names of several species and investigating the identity of the specimen examined for the author's earlier description of Neobatrachus albipes.

A genus name, Neoruinosus Wells and Wellington, 1985, erected to separate Neobatrachus sudelli as a monophyletic species or species group was placed in synonymy in the 2010 revision.

== Species ==
Common name	Binomial name
White-footed frog	Neobatrachus albipes (Roberts, Mahony, Kendrick, and Majors, 1991)
Northern burrowing frog	Neobatrachus aquilonius (Tyler, Davies, and Martin, 1981)
Tawny frog	Neobatrachus fulvus (Mahony and Roberts, 1986)
Kunapalari frog	Neobatrachus kunapalari (Mahony and Roberts, 1986)
Humming frog	Neobatrachus pelobatoides (Werner, 1914)
Painted burrowing frog	Neobatrachus pictus (Peters, 1863)
Sudell's frog	Neobatrachus sudelli (Lamb, 1911)
Shoemaker frog	Neobatrachus sutor (Main, 1957)
Goldfield's bull frog	Neobatrachus wilsmorei (Parker, 1940)
