= Goldfield's bull frog =

Conservation status
- Least Concern (IUCN 3.1)

Scientific classification
- Kingdom: Animalia
- Phylum: Chordata
- Class: Amphibia
- Order: Anura
- Family: Limnodynastidae
- Genus: Neobatrachus
- Species: N. wilsmorei

Binomial name
- Neobatrachus wilsmorei (Parker, 1940)

Species of amphibian

Goldfield's bullfrog (Neobatrachus wilsmorei), or Wilsmore's frog, is a species of frog in the family Limnodynastidae. It is endemic to Australia. Its natural habitats are temperate shrubland, subtropical or tropical dry shrubland, Mediterranean-type shrubby vegetation, subtropical or tropical dry lowland grassland, intermittent freshwater marshes, hot deserts, and temperate desert.
