= Weigel's toad =

Conservation status
- Least Concern (IUCN 3.1)

Scientific classification
- Kingdom: Animalia
- Phylum: Chordata
- Class: Amphibia
- Order: Anura
- Family: Limnodynastidae
- Genus: Notaden
- Species: N. weigeli

Binomial name
- Notaden weigeli Shea & Johnston, 1987

Species of frog

Weigel's toad (Notaden weigeli) is a species of frog in the family Limnodynastidae. It is endemic to Australia. Its natural habitats are subtropical or tropical dry shrubland, subtropical or tropical dry lowland grassland, intermittent freshwater marshes, and rocky areas.
