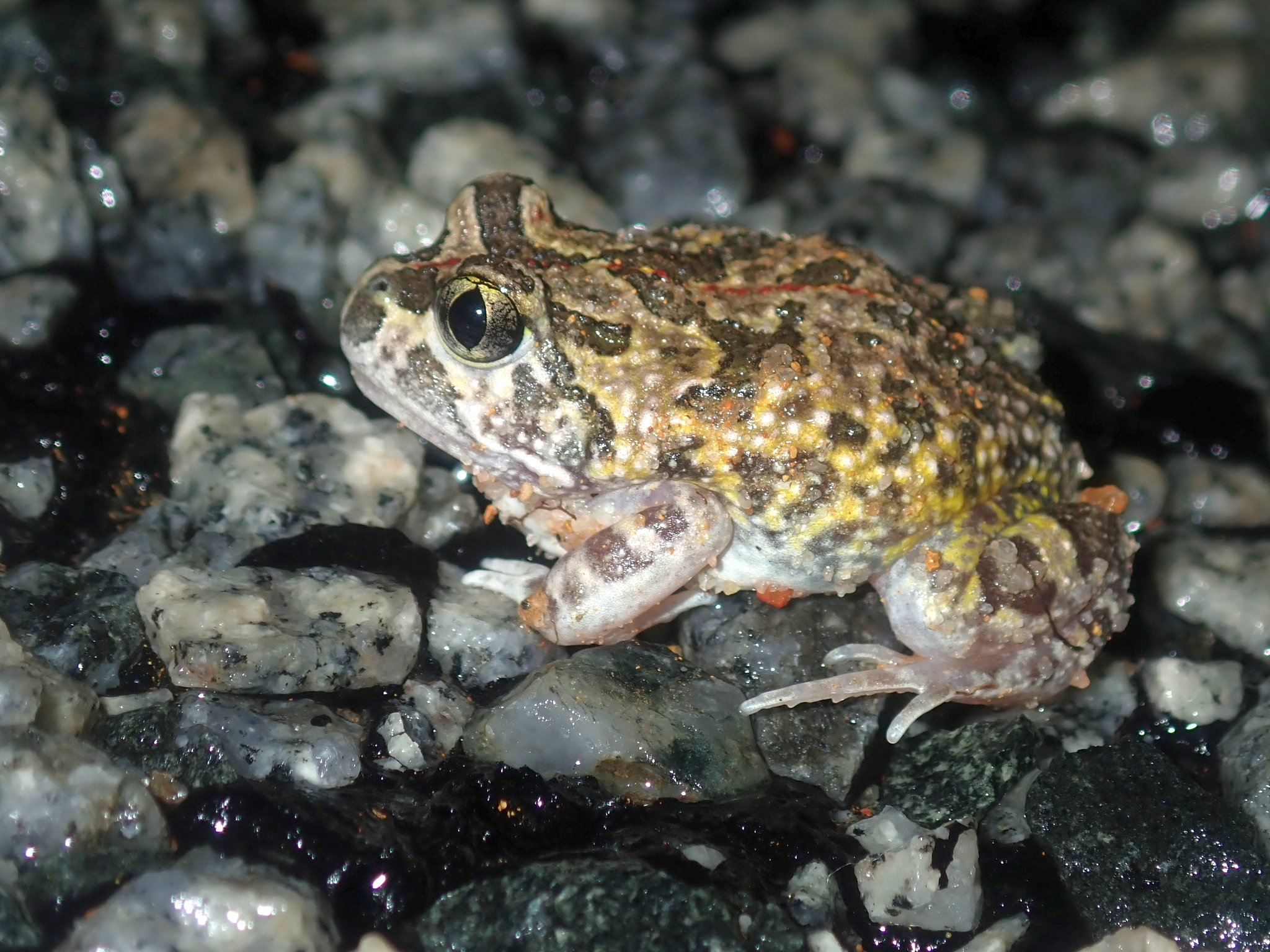

Conservation status
- Least Concern (IUCN 3.1)

Scientific classification
- Kingdom: Animalia
- Phylum: Chordata
- Class: Amphibia
- Order: Anura
- Family: Limnodynastidae
- Genus: Neobatrachus
- Species: N. pelobatoides

Binomial name
- Neobatrachus pelobatoides (Werner, 1914)

= Humming frog =

Species of amphibian

The humming frog (Neobatrachus pelobatoides) is a species of frog in the family Limnodynastidae. It is endemic to Australia. Its natural habitats are temperate forests, temperate shrubland, Mediterranean-type shrubby vegetation, intermittent freshwater marshes, rocky areas, arable land, pastureland and open excavations.

== Description ==
The humming frog is a plump frog with protuberant eyes that grows to a length of about 5 centimetres (2.0 in). The back is yellowish or greyish-brown in colour, dappled with darker markings and dotted with small warts. Some individuals have a red or a white streak along the spine. The underside is pale. The feet of females have webbing to halfway along the toes while the feet of males are fully webbed. This species gets its common name from the characteristic trill made by males at breeding time.

== Distribution and habitat ==
The humming frog is endemic to the south western part of Western Australia, its range extending from Geraldton to Esperance. It is found in both sandy and clay areas of deserts and agricultural land at altitudes up to 600 metres (2,000 ft) and is a burrowing species.

== Biology ==
In the hottest part of the summer the humming frog buries itself deeply, sheds its skin to make a cocoon and aestivates. During this period of dormancy its metabolic activity diminishes by up to 86% and its oxygen requirement is much reduced. It emerges when the rains arrive in autumn and early winter and then finds its way to under water air pockets pools and other water bodies to breed. Females lay up to a thousand eggs and the tadpoles undergo metamorphosis into juvenile frogs after about four months of development.

== Status ==
The IUCN Red List of Threatened Species lists the humming frog as being of "Least Concern". The frog has an extensive range, some of which is in protected areas, has few threats and the population seems stable.
