= Tawny frog =

Conservation status
- Least Concern (IUCN 3.1)

Scientific classification
- Kingdom: Animalia
- Phylum: Chordata
- Class: Amphibia
- Order: Anura
- Family: Limnodynastidae
- Genus: Neobatrachus
- Species: N. fulvus

Binomial name
- Neobatrachus fulvus Mahony & Roberts, 1986

Species of frog

The tawny frog (Neobatrachus fulvus), or tawny trilling frog, is a species of frog in the family Limnodynastidae. It is endemic to Australia.

Its natural habitats are subtropical or tropical dry shrubland, subtropical or tropical dry lowland grassland, and intermittent freshwater marshes.
