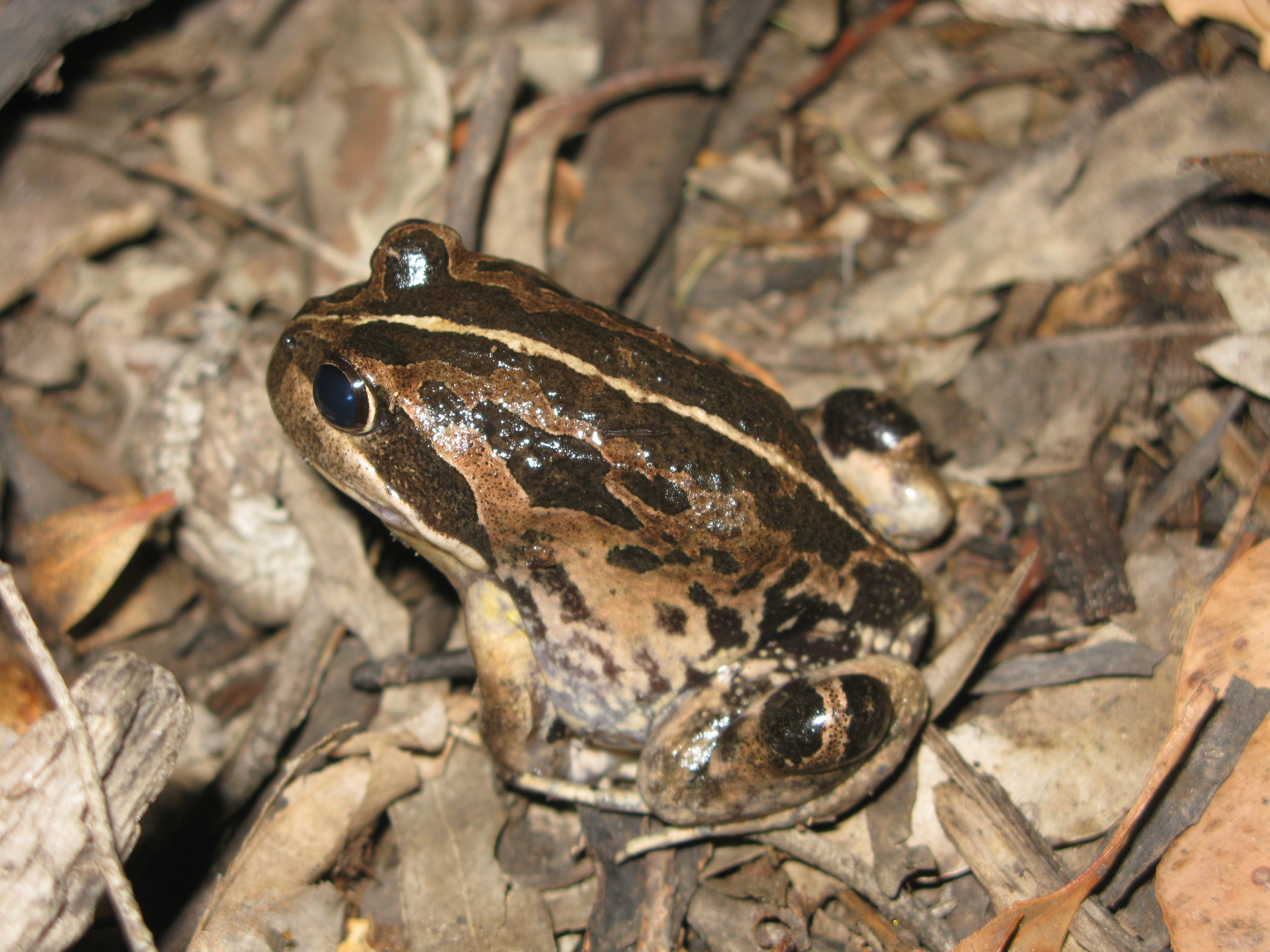
- Least Concern (IUCN 3.1)

Scientific classification
- Kingdom: Animalia
- Phylum: Chordata
- Class: Amphibia
- Order: Anura
- Family: Limnodynastidae
- Genus: Limnodynastes
- Species: L. dorsalis

Binomial name
- Limnodynastes dorsalis Gray, 1841

= Limnodynastes dorsalis =

Conservation status

Species of frog

Pobblebonk and motorbike frogs at Lake Seppings December 2016

The western banjo frog (Limnodynastes dorsalis) is a species of frog from the family Limnodynastidae. The common names for this species are pobblebonk, sand frog and bullfrog. It is one of the endemic amphibians of Western Australia.

A large frog in the family Myobatrachidae, it has sturdy limbs and a head that is triangular. Females are up to 87 mm (3.4 in) long, the males are no bigger than 75 mm (3.0 in). The frog is grey or brownish-olive coloured, with irregular blotches and marbling of a very dark or black colour. They have poisonous glands on their calves. The markings are large on the upper surface and smaller at the legs and face. A wide and dark stripe appears across the eye and extends to the fore limb. The underside is pale, white or yellowish, and smooth. The upper surface is also smooth, or may be slightly warty. A large oval bump, the tibial gland, is located on the upper calf of the hind leg. The toes are very slightly webbed, the second toe is perhaps a little longer than the first. The groin area is reddish to bright red, this distinguishes the western species from the otherwise similar Limnodynastes dumerilii (eastern banjo frog).

The call is a made by males when they are almost submerged, or in dense vegetation, this is a loud 'plonk' or 'bonk' sound. This sound is similar to a plucked banjo string, and it is from this that the common names are derived. The 'explosive' sound of the frogs calling in unison is well known in the region. The spawn produced after mating is located on still to slowly moving water, where it forms a large mass. This floats on the surface around grasses or other anchorages.

The diet of this frog is primarily insects and worms, but it will eat anything that it can capture.

The species was first described in 1841. There are twelve species of Limnodynastes found in Australia, Limnodynastes dorsalis is the only one to be found in the Southwest of the country. The species is endemic to an area surrounded by arid regions, where it became isolated by climate changes in the continent. The species is distributed throughout Southwest Australia, a biodiverse region with a mediterranean climate, where it occupies habitat near permanent water. It is endemic to Western Australia. The northern part of its range is east of Kalbarri, the species also occurs in the east to the Bight and inland to arid areas.

The Limnodynastes dorsalis population has been vulnerable to changes in land use, but it appears to be secure from threatening factors. The introduction of dams in rural areas, or water features in suburban areas, has created habitat that is readily occupied by pobblebonks. The species is common across the southwest of the state, and are numerous around creeks and rivers. They are usually found in dense vegetation at these sites, but sometimes occupy burrows during the dry season.
