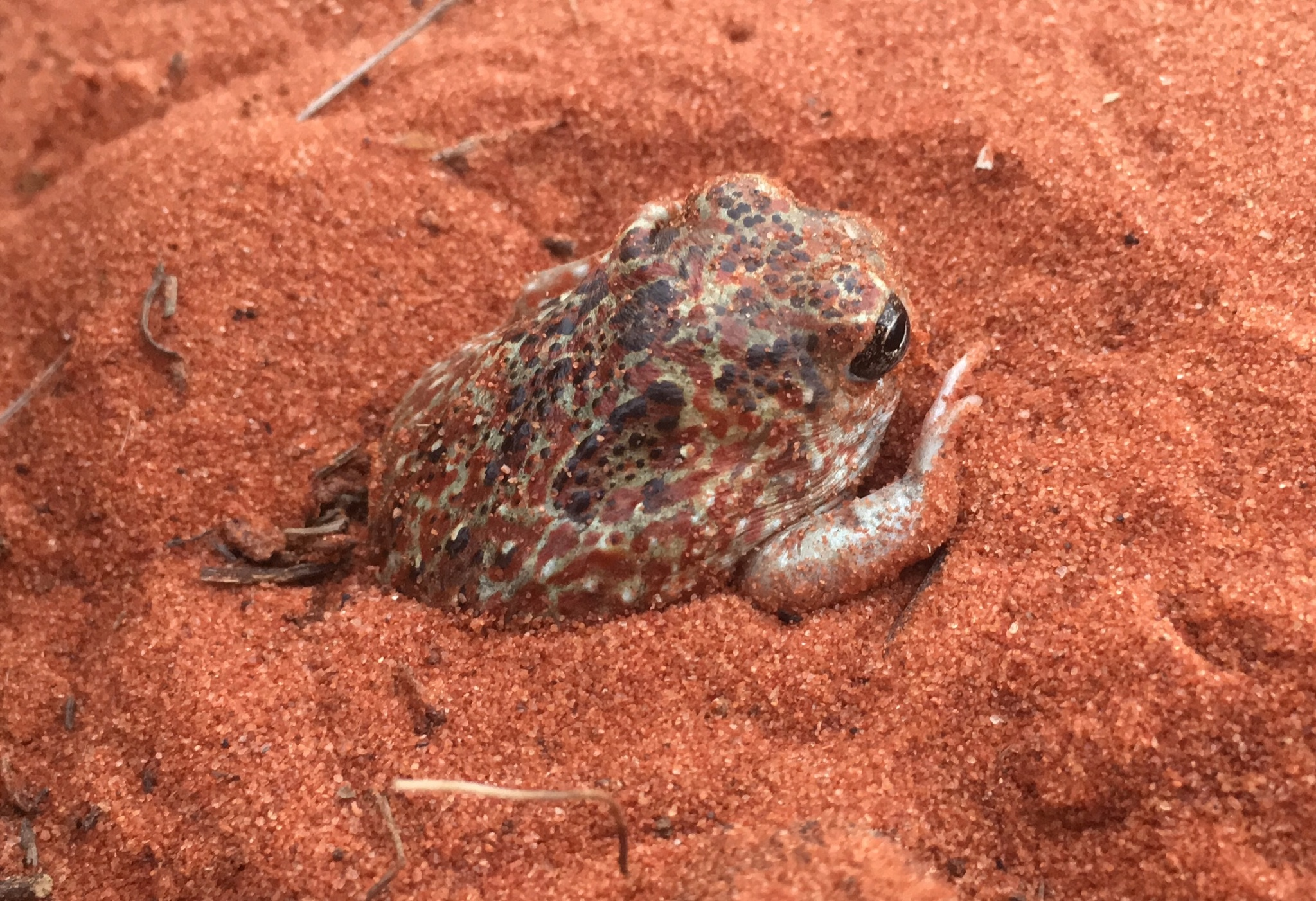

Conservation status
- Least Concern (IUCN 3.1)

Scientific classification
- Kingdom: Animalia
- Phylum: Chordata
- Class: Amphibia
- Order: Anura
- Family: Limnodynastidae
- Genus: Notaden
- Species: N. nichollsi

Binomial name
- Notaden nichollsi Parker, 1940

= Desert spadefoot toad =

Species of frog

The desert spadefoot toad (Notaden nichollsi) is a species of frog in the family Limnodynastidae. It is endemic to Australia. Its natural habitats are subtropical or tropical dry shrubland, subtropical or tropical dry lowland grassland, intermittent freshwater marshes, hot deserts, and temperate desert.

This species will burrow communaly underground to survive the hot and arid climate of Australia to conserve energy and water.

== Distribution and habitat ==
Notaden nichollsi is typically found sand dunes due to the water potential properties around the Southern Kimberly region of Western Australia, Northern Territory and into western Queensland.

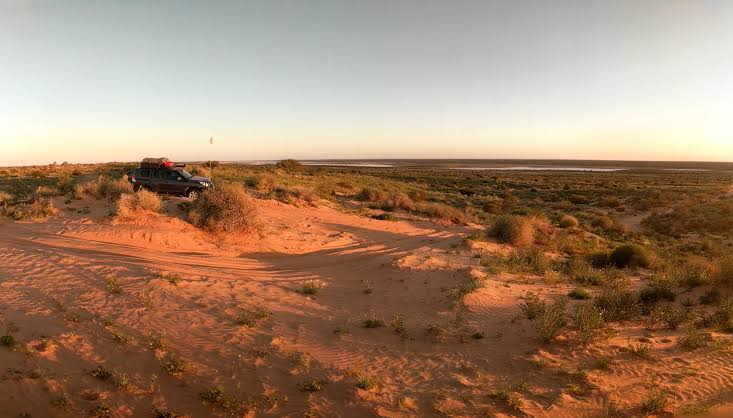
The Simpson desert

== Taxonomy ==
Notaden nichollsi was originally described by George Howard Parker in 1940 and is classified under the family Limnodynastidae, commonly known as Australian ground frogs. The genus Notaden, to which this species belongs, was established by Albert Günther in 1873 based on his early observations.

== Ecology and behaviour ==
Notaden nichollsi undergo aestivation in burrows near the dune crests after rainfall during periods of water shortages.

These burrows serve as shelters where the frogs can seek refuge during periods of extreme heat or dryness, as well as provide a safe environment for reproduction and the development of tadpoles.

Notaden nichollsi, like other non-burrowing frogs, relies on mechanisms to maintain water balance. One key aspect is the regulation of the hormone arginine vasotocin, which acts as the primary antidiuretic hormone for most frogs.

== Diet ==
Gut analysis of N. nichollsi found found it to consist entirely of termites and ants.

== Reproduction ==
Notaden nichollsi lay eggs in small dams and temporary flooded ditches. Their tadpoles often remain on the bottom of water bodies, and take two weeks to one month to develop into frogs. Shallow bodies of warm water may develop the tadpoles faster.

== Conservation ==
Notaden nichollsi is currently assessed as a species of Least Concern on the UCN Red List of Threatened Species.
