= Shoemaker frog =

Conservation status
- Least Concern (IUCN 3.1)

Scientific classification
- Kingdom: Animalia
- Phylum: Chordata
- Class: Amphibia
- Order: Anura
- Family: Limnodynastidae
- Genus: Neobatrachus
- Species: N. sutor

Binomial name
- Neobatrachus sutor Main, 1957

Species of amphibian

The shoemaker frog (Neobatrachus sutor) is a species of frog in the family Limnodynastidae. It is found in Western Australia. Its natural habitats are temperate scrub, subtropical or tropical dry shrubland, Mediterranean-type shrubby vegetation, subtropical or tropical dry lowland grassland, intermittent freshwater marshes, hot deserts, and temperate desert. The frog is named after the noise they make which sounds like a hammer in use. The frog is yellow to golden in colour. It usually has some brown blotches and is at maximum 5 cm. When they breed, the female frog lays 200 – 1000 eggs.
