= Russell's toadlet =

Conservation status
- Least Concern (IUCN 3.1)

Scientific classification
- Kingdom: Animalia
- Phylum: Chordata
- Class: Amphibia
- Order: Anura
- Family: Myobatrachidae
- Genus: Uperoleia
- Species: U. russelli

Binomial name
- Uperoleia russelli (Loveridge, 1933)

Species of frog

The Russell's toadlet (Uperoleia russelli) is a species of frog in the family Myobatrachidae. Also known as the Northwest toadlet, it is endemic to Australia. Its natural habitats are subtropical or tropical dry lowland grassland, intermittent rivers, freshwater marshes, intermittent freshwater marshes, and canals and ditches.

== Distribution and habitat ==
The species' known range is limited to the Carnarvon and Gascoyne regions of Western Australia.
