= Geocrinia leai =

Lea's frog

Conservation status
- Least Concern (IUCN 3.1)

Scientific classification
- Kingdom: Animalia
- Phylum: Chordata
- Class: Amphibia
- Order: Anura
- Family: Myobatrachidae
- Genus: Geocrinia
- Species: G. leai

Binomial name
- Geocrinia leai (J. J. Fletcher, 1898)

Species of amphibian

Geocrinia leai, sometimes called Lea's frog, is a species in the taxonomic family, Myobatrachidae and is endemic to southwest Australia. As with the other species in the genus Geocrinia, it is restricted to the high rainfall region at the south west of Western Australia; the very same Walpole/Nornalup district occupied by cogenor Geocrinia lutea. Ecology is similar to that of Geocrinia rosea, part of the so-called 'roseate complex'.
