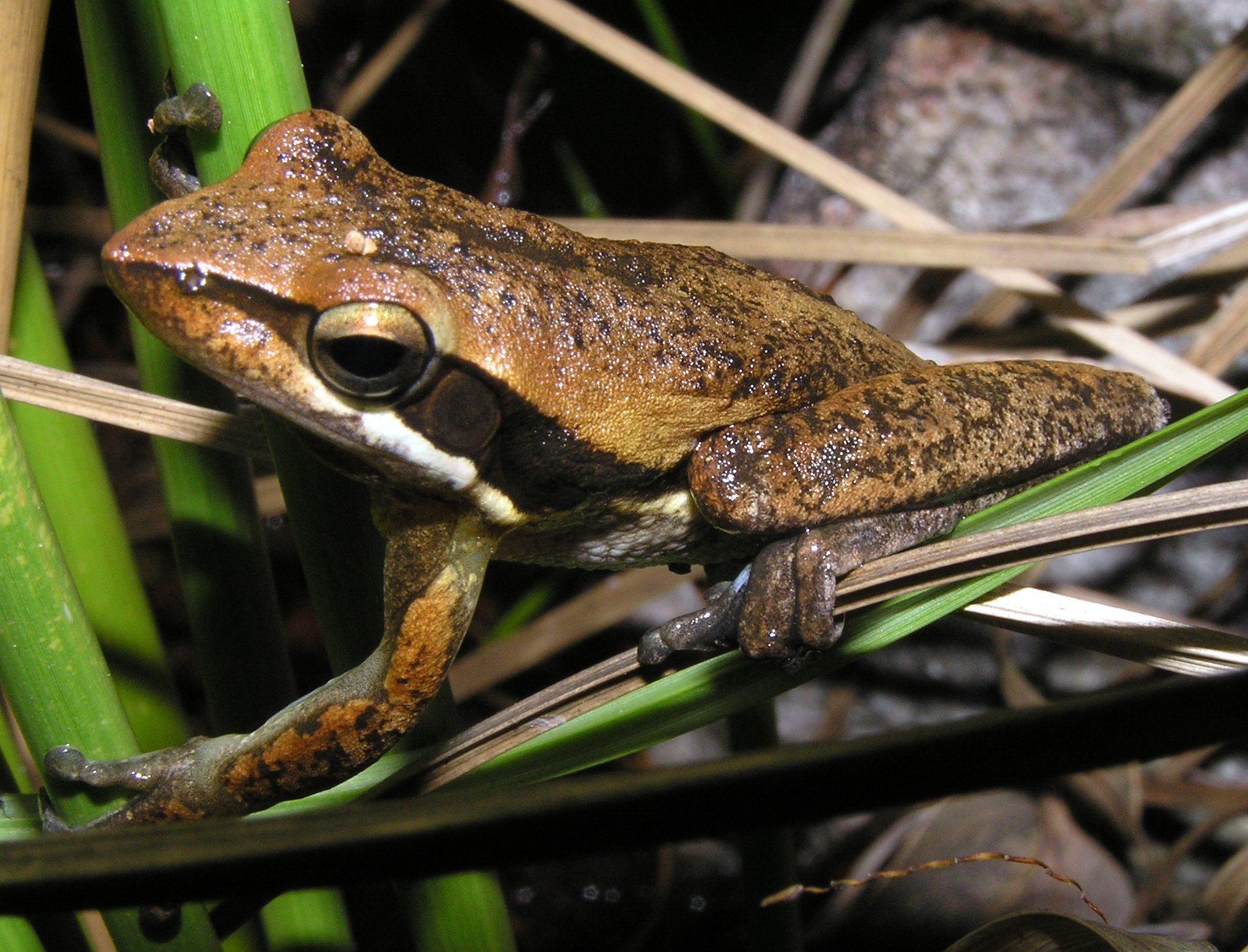

Conservation status
- Least Concern (IUCN 3.1)

Scientific classification
- Kingdom: Animalia
- Phylum: Chordata
- Class: Amphibia
- Order: Anura
- Family: Pelodryadidae
- Genus: Coggerdonia
- Species: C. adelaidensis

Binomial name
- Coggerdonia adelaidensis (Gray, 1841)
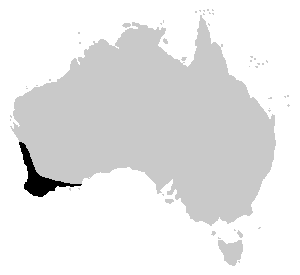
- Distribution of the slender tree frog

Synonyms
- Hyla adelaidensis Gray, 1841; Hyla bioculata Gray, 1841; Hyla Schuetteii Keferstein, 1868; Litoria adelaidensis Gray, 1841

= Slender tree frog =

Species of amphibian

The slender tree frog (Coggerdonia adelaidensis) is a tree frog native to south-western Australia.

== Description ==
As suggested by its name, the slender tree frog has a very slender build. It has a thin, flat body with a pointed snout. The dorsal surface varies in colour, from completely brown or green, to brown with green patches. The flanks of the body have a dark brown or black stripe, which runs from the back leg to the nostril; the line is much narrower between the nostril and the eye. The ventral surface is white, and the inside of the thighs has bright orange spots. The tympanum is large and distinct. The fingers are mostly unwebbed, and the toes are three-quarter webbed. They reach a length of 4.7 centimetres (1.9 in) from snout to vent.

== Ecology and behaviour ==
Males call from an elevated position near a still water source to attract females; the call is a harsh "screech". Breeding occurs in late winter or early spring, although they will call year-round. Eggs are laid in small clusters on the stems of submerged aquatic vegetation. The slender tree frog is found in permanent swamps and lagoons, often at the water's edge among the vegetation.
