= Spicospina =

Sunset frog

Conservation status
- Endangered (IUCN 3.1)

Scientific classification
- Kingdom: Animalia
- Phylum: Chordata
- Class: Amphibia
- Order: Anura
- Family: Myobatrachidae
- Genus: Spicospina; Roberts, Horwitz, Wardell-Johnson, Maxson & Mahony, 1997
- Species: S. flammocaerulea

Binomial name
- Spicospina flammocaerulea Roberts, Horwitz, Wardell-Johnson, Maxson, and Mahony, 1997, 1997
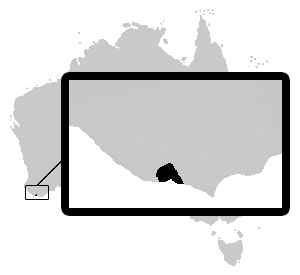

Genus of amphibians

Spicospina is a genus of ground-dwelling frogs in the family Myobatrachidae. It is monotypic, being represented by the single species, Spicospina flammocaerulea, also known as the sunset frog. First discovered in the year 1994, it is native to south-western Western Australia. It is known from only 27 sites, all occurring east and northeast of Walpole.

== Description ==
Spicospina flammocaerulea is a small species, with a snout-vent length of 31-36 mm in the females and males growing to 29.5-34.8 mm. The physical appearance and colouration differs greatly from all other Australian frog species. It is a shiny dark-purple to black or very dark grey on the dorsal surface. There are orange markings below the vent, around the margins of the body and on the hands and feet that resemble the sunset. The throat, chest and the underside of the hands and feet are also orange. The back is granular with many raised glands, a large parotoid gland is located behind each eye. The belly has vivid light blue spotting on a dark background which is smooth. The fingers and toes are free from webbing and pads.

== Ecology and behavior ==
The sunset frog is only found in isolated permanently moist peat swamps, in high rainfall areas. These sites have high moisture content and are often protected from drier conditions by seepages that provide water even through the drier seasons (spring and summer). Males call between October and December from shallow pools, water seepages or in open water along creek margins. They make a rapidly repeated "dd-duk-duk". Females lay less than 200 eggs that are deposited singly often supported by algae mats just below the surface of the water. Breeding sites were found to be at the top of drainage systems, which may allow for easier dispersal of tadpoles and juveniles into creek margins. There is little information on the biology of tadpoles or immature individuals, as they are uncommonly observed in the wild.

== Threats ==
Due to this species being endemic to South-Western Australia, as well as having a decreasing area of occupancy of 68 km^{2} and decreasing extent of occurrence of 356 km^{2} makes this species extremely sensitive to local disasters. Current threats to habitat such as climate change, feral pigs, fire regime changes, and agricultural expansion makes this species extremely susceptible to extinction.

=== Chytridiomycosis ===
Chytrid fungus (Batrachochytrium dendrobatidis) is a highly transmittable fungal pathogen that has global effects on amphibians and is capable of causing mass mortality events. Chytrid has been recorded in four regions of Australia including the southwest area, where S. flammocaerulea is located. As of April 2024, there have been no documented instances of S. flammocaerulea contracting chytrid.

=== Fire Regime ===
Fires, particularly prescribed burns may be creating significant challenges for these species in the southwestern region of Australia. Prescription burns started in 1967 in the Walpole-Nornalup National Park, with the most recent burn in 2017. With S. flammocaerulea having a restricted geographic range, prescribed burns may destroy suitable habitat needed for the distribution of a changing climate and possibly disrupt breeding sites.

== Conservation Efforts ==
On 19 December 2011, the DEC in combination with Perth Zoo released 31 captive-bred endangered sunset frogs and 251 tadpoles into a private property in Mt Frankland area in order to extend the known range of the species.

== Conservation status ==
Spicospina flammocaerulea was listed as Vulnerable in 2002 and again in 2004 under the IUCN Red List category and criteria. In November 2021, Spicospina was reassessed and listed as Endangered.

The Sunset Frog is listed as endangered under the Environment Protection and Biodiversity Conservation Act 1999.
