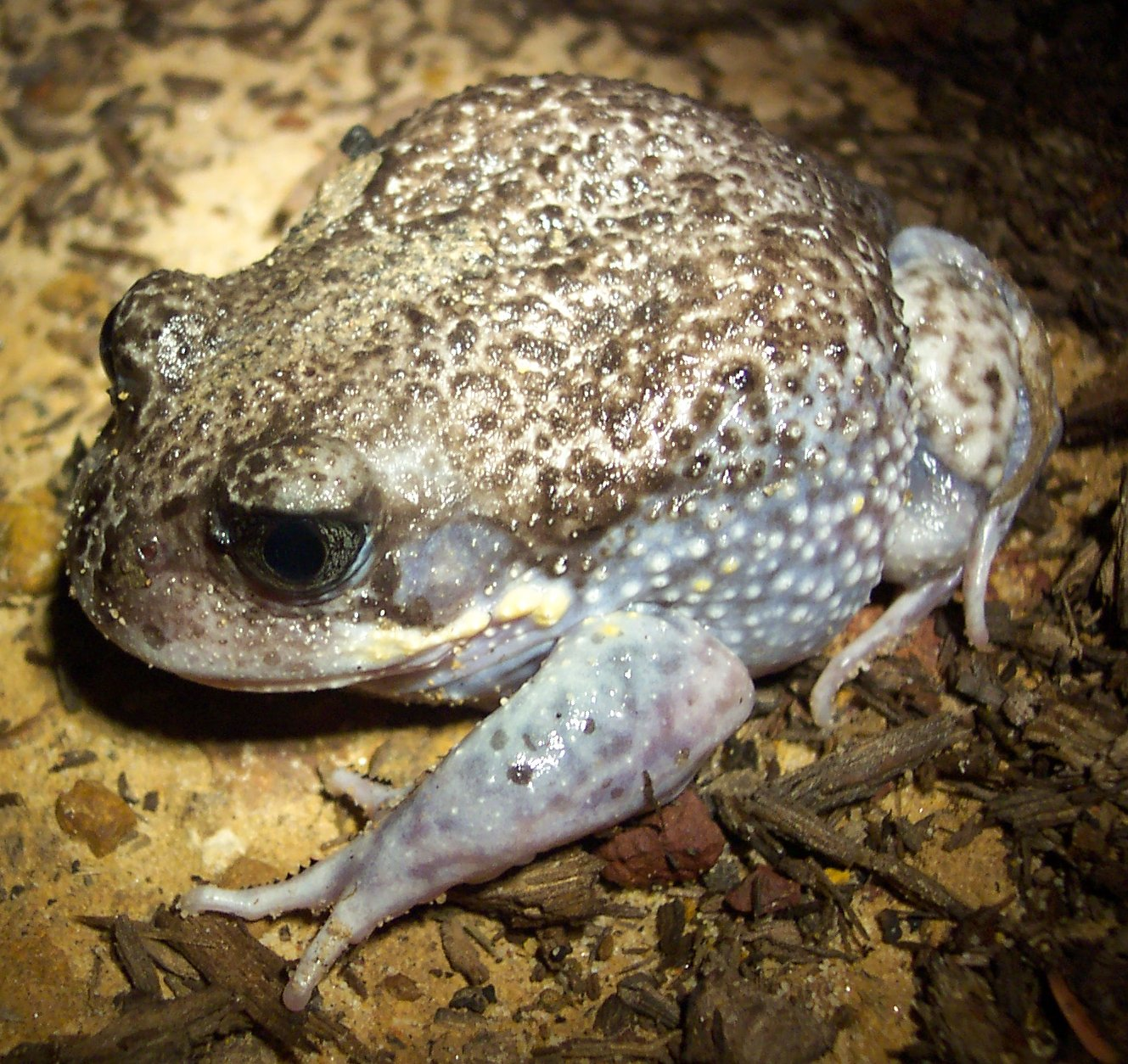
- The giant burrowing frog (Heleioporus australiacus)

Scientific classification
- Kingdom: Animalia
- Phylum: Chordata
- Class: Amphibia
- Order: Anura
- Family: Limnodynastidae
- Genus: Heleioporus; Gray, 1841

Species
- See text
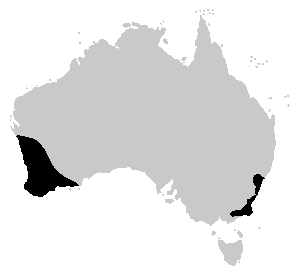
- Range of Heleioporus in Australia.

= Heleioporus =

Genus of amphibians

Heleioporus is a genus of frogs native to Australia. Of the nine species in this genus, five live in south-west Western Australia, while the other species occurs only in southeastern Australia. All members of this genus are medium to large sized burrowing frogs with rounded heads, short bodies, bulging eyes, short limbs and the hands are free from webbing. The toes are relatively short with only a trace of fleshy webbing. A characteristic of this genus (except for Heleioporus eyrei and some Heleioporus psammophilus) is the black nuptial spines that male frogs have on their first and occasionally second and third fingers. The pupil restrict to form a vertical slit and the tympanum is usually distinct. All the species in this genus call from burrows where the eggs are later deposited in a foam mass. Embryos develop in this mass until hatching. Hatching occurs after the burrows are flooded with water, and may be delayed until this happens. The calls of these species are similar although differ in frequency, length, note and repetition rate.

== Species ==
Common name	Binomial name
Western spotted frog	Heleioporus albopunctatus Gray, 1841
Giant burrowing frog	Heleioporus australiacus (Shaw & Nodder, 1795)
Hooting frog	Heleioporus barycragus Lee, 1967
Moaning frog	Heleioporus eyrei (Gray, 1845)
Plains frog	Heleioporus inornatus Lee & Main, 1954
Sand frog	Heleioporus psammophilus Lee & Main, 1954
