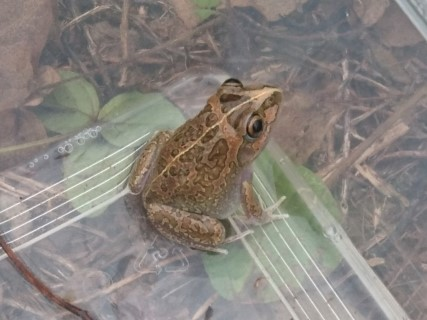

Conservation status
- Least Concern (IUCN 3.1)

Scientific classification
- Kingdom: Animalia
- Phylum: Chordata
- Class: Amphibia
- Order: Anura
- Family: Pelodryadidae
- Genus: Cyclorana
- Species: C. longipes

Binomial name
- Cyclorana longipes Tyler & Martin, 1977

Synonyms
- Ranoidea longipes Tyler and Martin, 1977; Litoria longipes (Tyler and Martin, 1977)

= Cyclorana longipes =

Species of amphibian

Cyclorana longipes, the long-footed frog, is a species of frog in the subfamily Pelodryadidae endemic to Australia. Its natural habitats are subtropical or tropical dry lowland grassland and intermittent freshwater marshes.
