= Hidden-ear frog =

Conservation status
- Least Concern (IUCN 3.1)

Scientific classification
- Kingdom: Animalia
- Phylum: Chordata
- Class: Amphibia
- Order: Anura
- Family: Pelodryadidae
- Genus: Cyclorana
- Species: C. cryptotis

Binomial name
- Cyclorana cryptotis (Tyler & Martin, 1977)

Synonyms
- List: Cyclorana cryptotis Tyler & Martin, 1977; Litoria (Cyclorana) cryptotis (Tyler & Martin, 1977); Dryopsophus cryptotis (Tyler & Martin, 1977)

Species of amphibian

The hidden-ear frog (Cyclorana cryptotis) is a species of frog in the family Pelodryadidae. It is endemic to Australia. Its natural habitats are subtropical or tropical dry lowland grassland and intermittent freshwater marshes. It is green or dull brown coloured.
