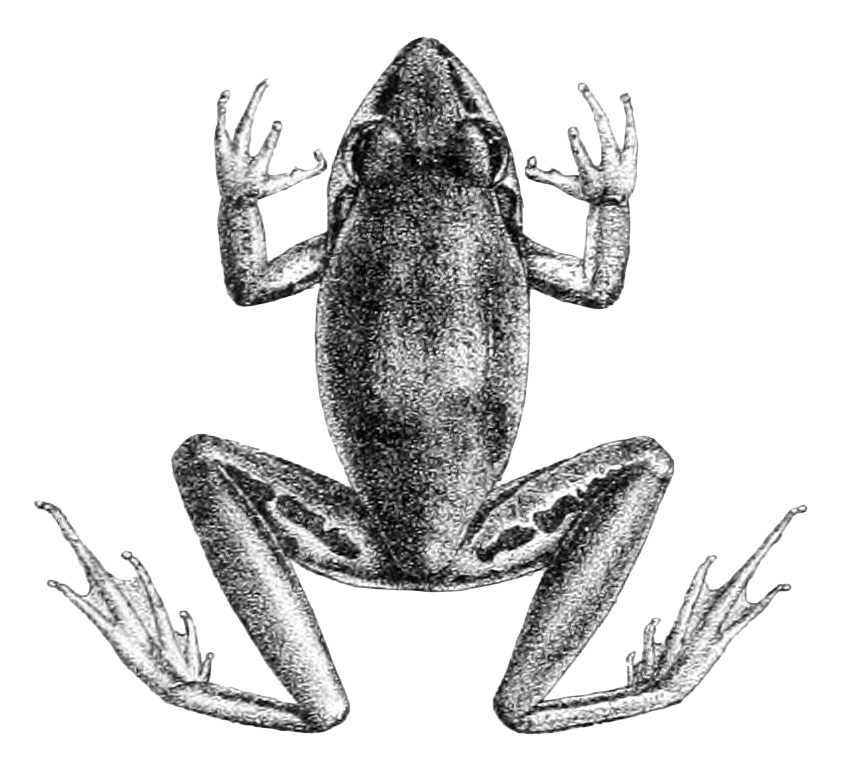

Conservation status
- Least Concern (IUCN 3.1)

Scientific classification
- Kingdom: Animalia
- Phylum: Chordata
- Class: Amphibia
- Order: Anura
- Family: Pelodryadidae
- Genus: Litoria
- Species: L. tornieri

Binomial name
- Litoria tornieri (Nieden, 1923)

Synonyms
- Pelodytes affinis Gray, 1842; Hyla affinis — Boulenger, 1882; Hyla tornieri Nieden, 1923 (nomen novum); Litoria tornieri — Cogger & Lindner, 1974

= Tornier's frog =

Species of amphibian

Tornier's frog (Litoria tornieri) is a species of frog in the subfamily Pelodryadinae. It is endemic to Australia.

== Habitat ==
Its natural habitats are subtropical or tropical dry forests, subtropical or tropical swamps, dry or moist savanna, subtropical or tropical dry lowland grassland, swamps, intermittent freshwater lakes, and intermittent freshwater marshes.
