= Douglas' toad =

Conservation status
- Least Concern (IUCN 3.1)

Scientific classification
- Kingdom: Animalia
- Phylum: Chordata
- Class: Amphibia
- Order: Anura
- Family: Myobatrachidae
- Genus: Pseudophryne
- Species: P. douglasi

Binomial name
- Pseudophryne douglasi Main, 1964

Species of frog

Douglas' toad (Pseudophryne douglasi) is a species of frog in the family Myobatrachidae. It is endemic to Western Australia. Its natural habitats are dry savanna, moist savanna, subtropical or tropical dry shrubland, rivers, freshwater marshes, freshwater springs, and rocky areas.

The frog's back is brown with an orange stripe in the middle of the lower back. It has an orange triangle on the snout. The belly is smooth and mottled black and white. Length is typically 30 mm.
