= Northern burrowing frog =

Conservation status
- Least Concern (IUCN 3.1)

Scientific classification
- Kingdom: Animalia
- Phylum: Chordata
- Class: Amphibia
- Order: Anura
- Family: Limnodynastidae
- Genus: Neobatrachus
- Species: N. aquilonius

Binomial name
- Neobatrachus aquilonius (Tyler, Davies & Martin, 1981)

Species of amphibian

The northern burrowing frog (Neobatrachus aquilonius) is a species of frog in the family Limnodynastidae. It is endemic to Australia. Its natural habitats are subtropical or tropical dry shrubland, subtropical or tropical dry lowland grassland, subtropical or tropical seasonally wet or flooded lowland grassland, and intermittent freshwater marshes.

It may be listed under the family Leptodactylidae in older sources. Its distribution is from the arid border of the Kimberley, Western Australia, near Broome and Derby, extending east into the Northern Territory and Western Queensland.
