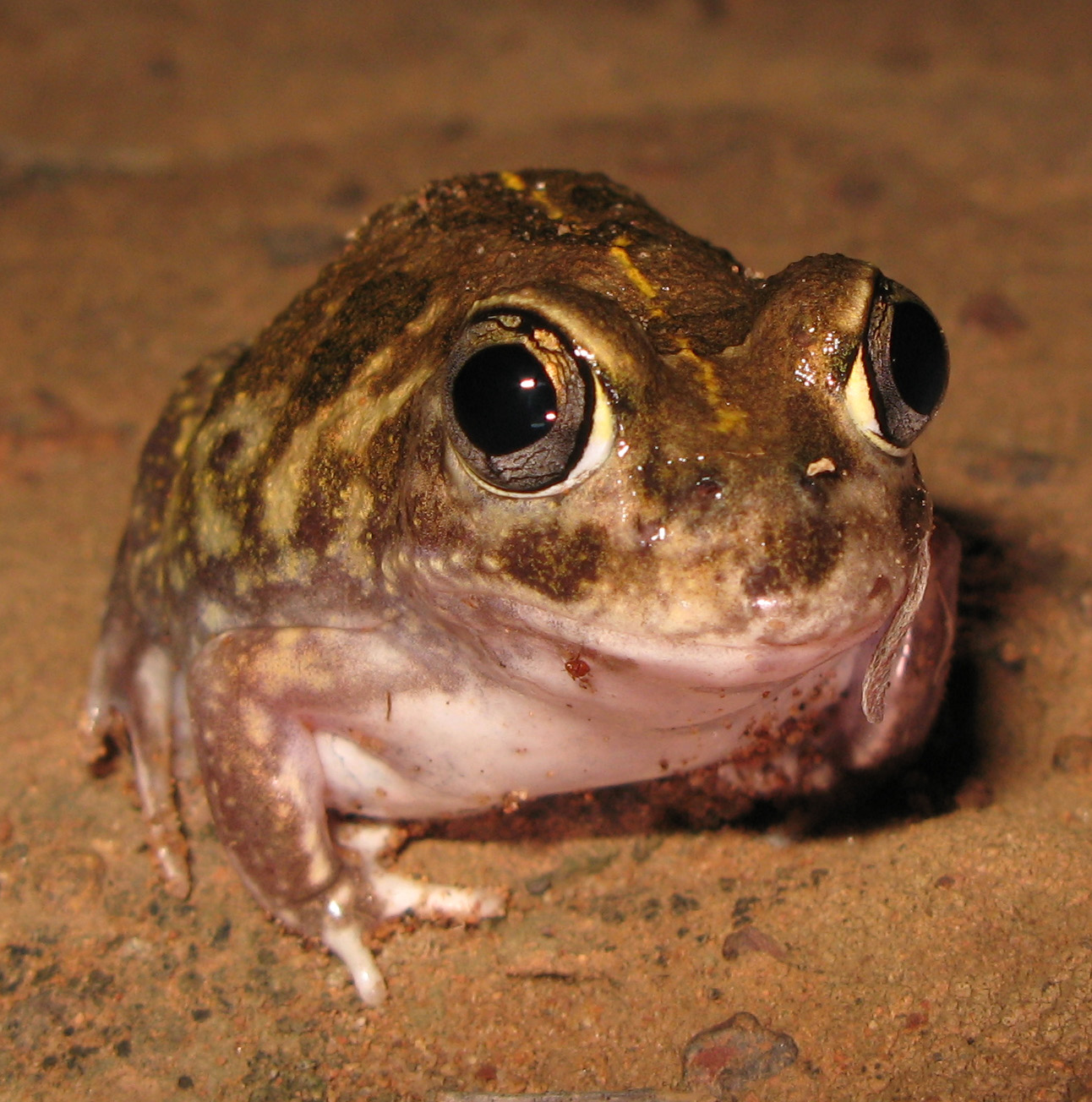

Conservation status
- Least Concern (IUCN 3.1)

Scientific classification
- Kingdom: Animalia
- Phylum: Chordata
- Class: Amphibia
- Order: Anura
- Family: Limnodynastidae
- Genus: Neobatrachus
- Species: N. sudellae

Binomial name
- Neobatrachus sudellae (Lamb, 1911)
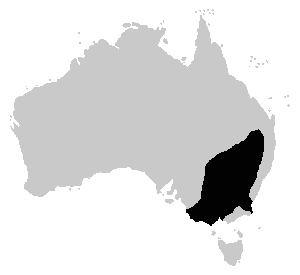
- Range of the Sudell's frog

Synonyms
- Heleioporus sudelli Lamb, 1911; Heleioporus centralis Parker, 1940; Neobatrachus centralis (Parker, 1940)

= Sudell's frog =

Species of amphibian

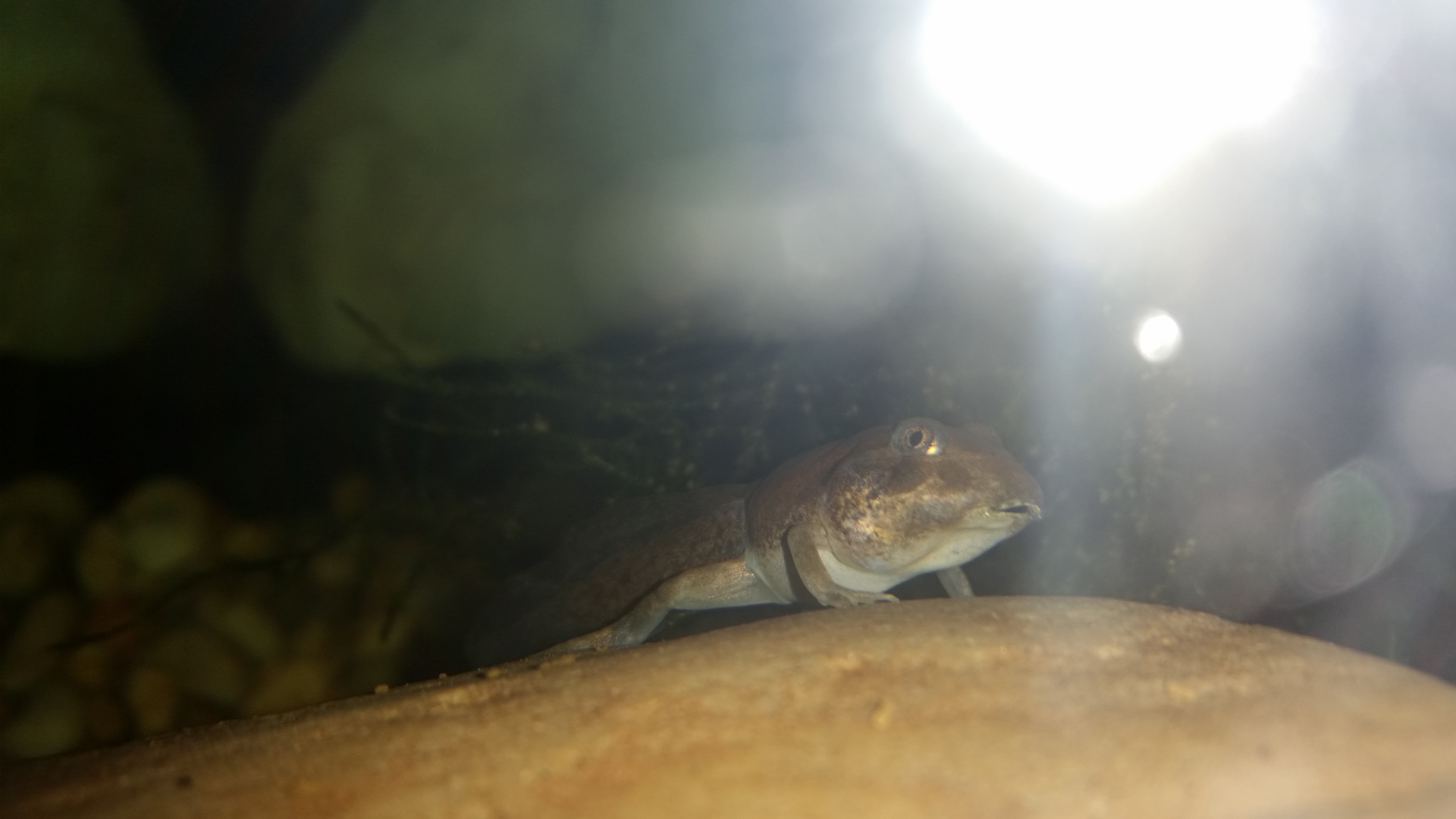
A mature desert trilling frog tadpole photographed in its late stages of change into the adult frog, all four adult limbs are pictured.

The Sudell's frog, painted burrowing frog (Neobatrachus sudellae), trilling frog or desert trilling frog (formerly Neobatrachus centralis) is a species of burrowing frog common to a large part of southeastern Australia. It is found on and west of the Great Dividing Range of New South Wales to western Victoria and southern Queensland, as well as far eastern South Australia, and southern regions of the Northern Territory.

== Taxonomy ==
First described in 1911 by Joseph Lamb (born 1869), the author assigning the name Heleioporus sudelli. The specific epithet honours "Miss J. Sudell", who collected the type specimen near Warwick in Queensland. It was transferred to the genus, Neobatrachus, to become Neobatrachus sudellae in 2012, the epithet reflecting the gender of its namesake.

The decision that is the same species as Neobatrachus centralis is based on work by Roberts in 2010.

== Description ==
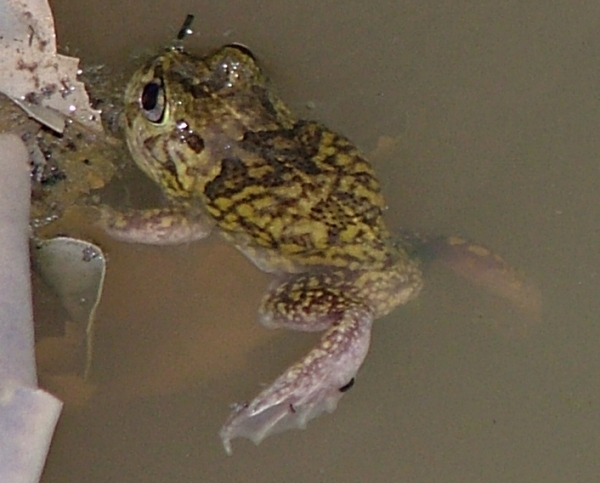
Sudell's frog showing entirely filled in metatarsal tubercle on back, left foot.

The Sudell's frog is relatively small, reaching only 40 mm in length. It is highly variable and is generally brown, however it may also be grey, yellow or reddish on the dorsal surface with irregular darker spots or blotches. There is often a pale mid-dorsal stripe running down the back. The belly is smooth and pale cream or white. The toes are fully webbed, however a deep indentation is present between the webbing of each toe. The metatarsal tubercles (a shovel like structure on the foot to assist with burrowing) are completely black. The pupil is vertical and iris is silver.

The trilling frog is a medium-sized short, fat frog (5 centimetres measured from snout to posterior), usually of a brown and tan colour with sharply differentiated mottling, much like army desert camouflage. This frog is white underneath. The pupil of this frog contracts to a vertical slit. The dorsal surface is usually smooth, however it is reported that during the breeding season, the males develop fine, dark bristles on their back. The trilling frog can be differentiated from the painted frog (Neobatrachus pictus) by the 'baggy pants' of loose skin that extends almost to their knees when the hind legs are extended

== Distribution ==
The trilling frog is found throughout the central Australian deserts in a band encompassing South Australia, Northern Territory and Western Australia; it is remarkable in its toleration for arid environments. Frogs commonly called Sudell's frog have a more easterly distribution.

== Ecology and behaviour ==
Sudell's frog inhabits ponds, dams, ditches, clay pans or any still water in woodland, shrubland, and disturbed areas (including farmland). Males make a short trilling sound while floating in water after heavy rains, which flood the breeding area, from late winter through to autumn. The species is an adapted burrower and will often spend periods of time underground to avoid drought conditions.

About 600 eggs are laid in a clump entwined among vegetation near the surface, however will sink if disturbed. Hatching occurs about 3 days after laying and tadpoles are plump and large reaching about 77 mm (at about stage 40). The tadpoles often overwinter and metamorphs measure from about 20 to 30mm in length.

The trilling frog is adapted to desert conditions and can spend years without having to surface, buried deep underground with their glands under the skin full of water. Trilling frogs will commonly dig themselves to the surface at the beginning of the late summer rains. There are stories that to prevent death by thirst, Indigenous Australians could catch these frogs by cleverly stamping on the right patch of ground to simulate thunder or falling rain, causing the frogs to surface where they could then be made to give up their stored moisture. These frogs will spend a few weeks calling nightly while floating in or sitting at the edge of rainwater filled claypans, puddles and waterholes.

They eat the numerous insects accompanying the rains and lay eggs in drawn out clumps, often wrapped around snags in the water. The tadpoles mature very quickly.

Like most Australian frogs, the trilling frog is an opportunistic predator and so the diet of the species consists mostly of any desert dwelling insects and reptiles small enough to fit in its mouth. In some areas it is the only ground living vertebrate collected.

== Similar species ==
It is similar to other species of Neobatrachus, particularly the painted burrowing frog (Neobatrachus pictus), from which it can be distinguished by baggy skin around the groin not being present in N. pictus. It is also similar to the ornate burrowing frog (Platyplectrum ornatum) and Heleioporus from which it can be distinguished by a fully black metatarsal, webbed toes and vertical pupil.

== Genetics ==
This interesting little frog is a tetraploid organism, having double the normal number of chromosomes. Genetic analysis led to speculation that Neobatrachus centralis is the same species as Neobatrachus sudelli (Roberts, 1997), something that is now accepted.

== As a pet ==
It is kept as a pet. In Australia this animal may be kept in captivity with the appropriate permit.

== Bibliography ==
- Anstis, M. 2002. Tadpoles of South-eastern Australia. Reed New Holland: Sydney. ISBN 1-876334-63-0
- Robinson, M. 2002. A Field Guide to Frogs of Australia. Australian Museum/Reed New Holland: Sydney. ISBN 1-876334-83-5
- Jean-Marc Hero, Dale Roberts (2004). "Neobatrachus centralis". IUCN Red List of Threatened Species. 2004 e.T41174A10398034. doi:10.2305/IUCN.UK.2004.RLTS.T41174A10398034.en. Database entry includes a range map and justification for why this species is of least concern
- Cogger, H.G. 1979. Reptiles & Amphibians of Australia. A. H. & A. W. REED PTY LTD. ISBN 0-589-50108-9
- Mahony MJ, Robinson ES. Polyploidy in the Australian leptodactylid frog genus Neobatrachus.. 1: Chromosoma. 1980;81(2):199-212.
- J. L. Read, Abundance and recruitment patterns of the trilling frog (Neobatrachus centralis) in the Australian arid zone. Australian Journal of Zoology 47(4) 393 - 404
- Tyler, M.J. 1994. Australian Frogs A Natural History. Reed Books ISBN 0-7301-0468-0
- Anstis, M. 2002. Tadpoles of South-eastern Australia. Reed New Holland: Sydney.
- DEH Frogs of SA > Neobatrachus centralis
