= Metacrinia =

Metacrinia nichollsi

Conservation status
- Least Concern (IUCN 3.1)

Scientific classification
- Kingdom: Animalia
- Phylum: Chordata
- Class: Amphibia
- Order: Anura
- Family: Myobatrachidae
- Subfamily: Myobatrachinae
- Genus: Metacrinia; Parker, 1940
- Species: M. nichollsi

Binomial name
- Metacrinia nichollsi Harrison, 1927
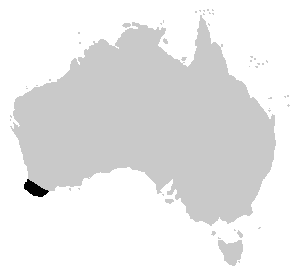
- Range of Metacrinia

Genus of amphibians endemic to Southwest Australia

Metacrinia is a genus of frog in the family Myobatrachidae. It is monotypic, being represented by the single species, Metacrinia nichollsi, commonly known as the Forest toadlet or Nicholls toadlet. It is endemic to Southwest Australia, occurring between Dunsborough and Albany.

== Description ==
Metacrinia nichollsi is a squat frog with short limbs and reaches 25 millimetres (0.98 in) in length. The dorsal colouration is very dark brown or black occasionally with pink flecks. The ventral surface is grey, dark blue or black with white marbling. There are yellow or orange markings at the base of each arm and on the underside of the thighs and lower belly. The skin on the dorsum is warty and the belly is granular. The tympanum is visible and the fingers and toes are free of webbing.

It is the only described species in the genus Metacrinia. The toadlet is poorly studied, but the diverse appearance of the toadlet suggests there may be more than one species.

== Ecology and behaviour ==
This species is found amongst leaf litter, under stones and logs in karri and jarrah forests. Breeding occurs in late summer with most activity after rain. The males make a short "ark" similar to that of species in the genus Pseudophryne. 25–30 eggs are laid in damp ground cover where they develop directly without a larval (tadpole) stage. The species was assessed as Least Concern in 2004.

== Similar species ==
Metacrinia may be confused with Günther's toadlet, Pseudophryne guentheri. It can be distinguished by the orange ventral markings.
