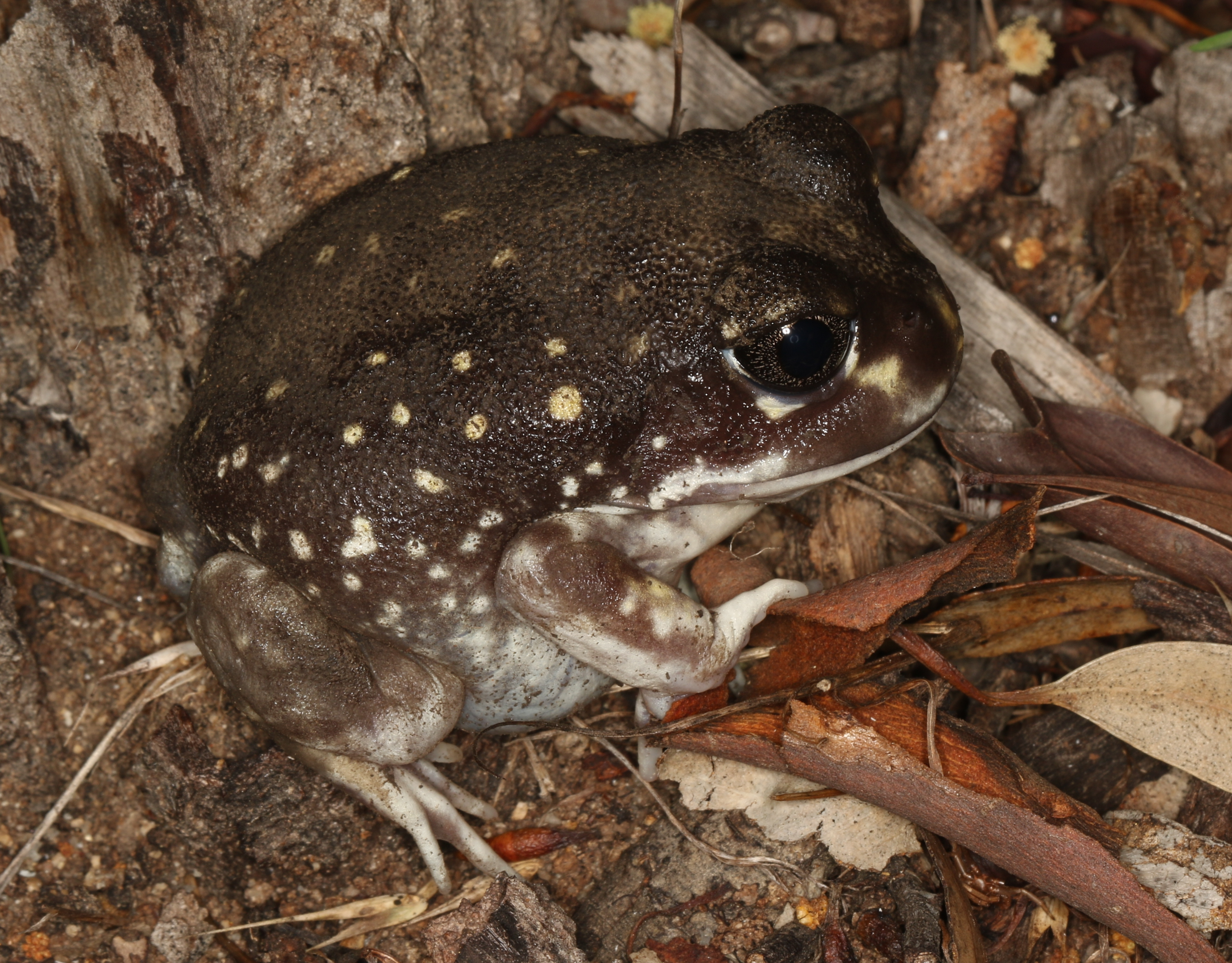

Conservation status
- Least Concern (IUCN 3.1)

Scientific classification
- Kingdom: Animalia
- Phylum: Chordata
- Class: Amphibia
- Order: Anura
- Family: Limnodynastidae
- Genus: Heleioporus
- Species: H. albopunctatus

Binomial name
- Heleioporus albopunctatus Gray, 1841

= Western spotted frog =

Species of amphibian

The western spotted frog (Heleioporus albopunctatus) is a species of frog in the family Limnodynastidae. It is endemic to Western Australia. Its natural habitats are forests, shrublands, intermittent rivers, freshwater marshes, rocky areas, granite outcrops, arable land, pastureland, open excavations, and canals and ditches. It is threatened by habitat loss and salinity.

== Breeding ==
Heleioporus albopunctatus has terrestrial egg deposition. Males excavate burrows up to 1 m deep in sandy substrates surrounding ephemeral waterbodies, and commence calling in autumn (March/April). Amplexus (mating) occurs in the burrow and females deposit a clutch of eggs embedded in foam, in a chamber at the base of the burrow. Eggs develop to mid-stage tadpoles within the eggs, but final development is dependent on winter rains filling the waterbody and flooding burrows. Tadpoles then hatch and complete development in the pond.

Some clutches of eggs have been found to be infested by the larvae of a dipteran fly Aphiura breviceps and females of this fly may reside in the burrows of this frog where they are presumed to feed on the outer capsules of the eggs. In one study, around 7% of burrows were found to have eggs infested with maggots from this phorid fly and the mean egg clutch size was 391, and on average, only 2.8% of clutches were found to experience some form of egg mortality.

== Population ==
Genetic studies have shown that there is good dispersal across the range of this species, however high levels of inbreeding were detected between some populations in the central wheatbelt region of WA, indicating that habitat fragmentation and salinity may be restricting gene flow. A comprehensive study of populations in the central wheatbelt of Western Australia used mark-recapture studies and found low levels of recapture (0.05 to 0.45) between years and estimated an overall survival rate ranging from 0.34-1. This study concluded that survival rates were generally high and the species was persisting in highly modified landscapes. A further population viability analysis study of 24 populations across a gradient from forest to cleared land, found that frog populations connected by dispersal (metapopulations) were less likely to become extinct than isolated populations. That study also found that the survival rates of juvenile frogs was the most important factor in the persistence of populations and that populations may survive well even under a drying climate, if breeding ponds can be managed to not dry out too quickly.
