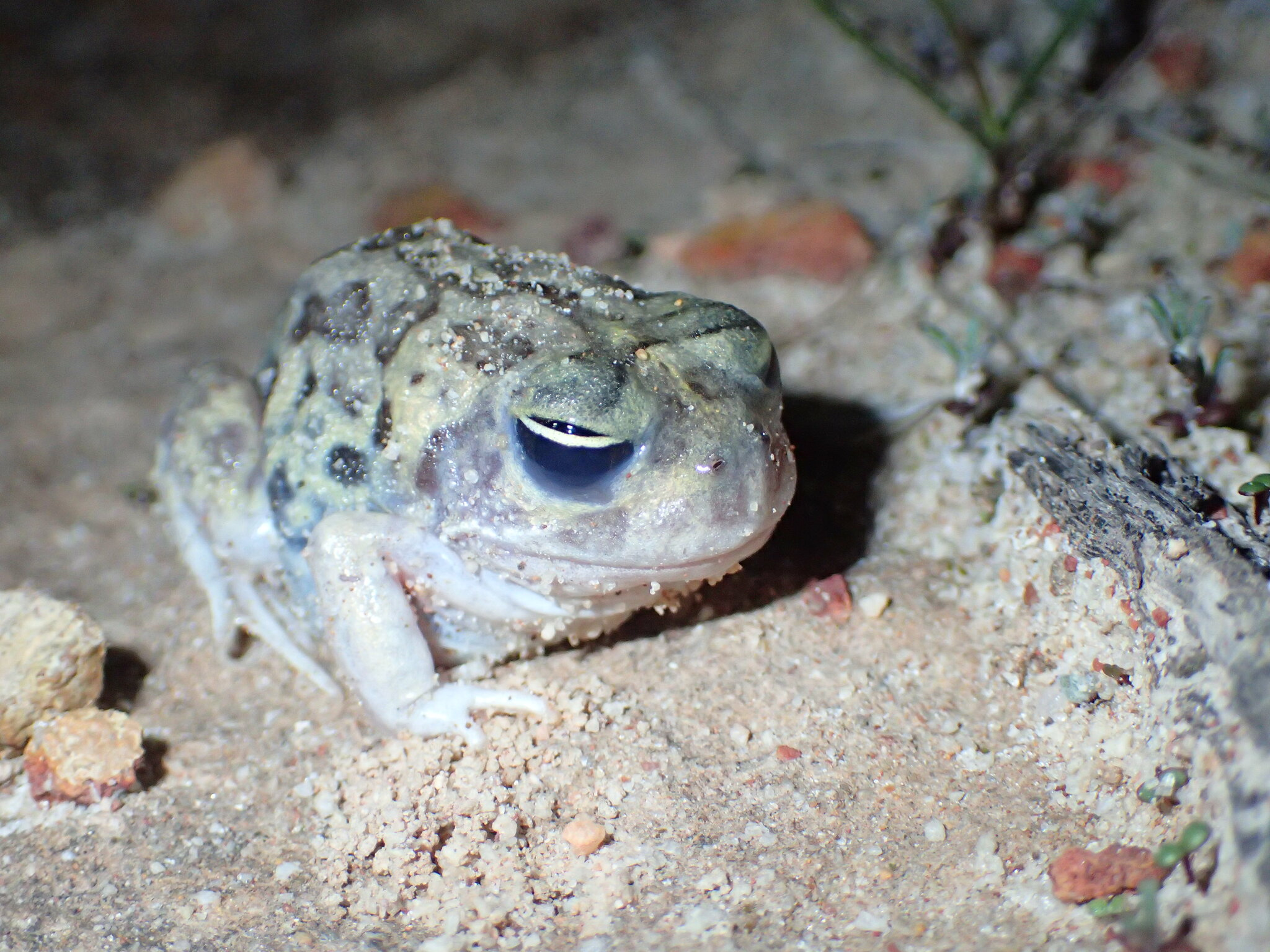

Conservation status
- Least Concern (IUCN 3.1)

Scientific classification
- Kingdom: Animalia
- Phylum: Chordata
- Class: Amphibia
- Order: Anura
- Family: Limnodynastidae
- Genus: Neobatrachus
- Species: N. albipes

Binomial name
- Neobatrachus albipes Roberts, Mahony, Kendrick & Majors, 1991

= White-footed frog =

Species of amphibian

The white-footed frog (Neobatrachus albipes), or white-footed trilling frog, is a species of frog in the family Limnodynastidae. It is endemic to the Esperance mallee ecoregion of Australia. (C.Michael Hogan. 2012) Its natural habitats are temperate shrubland, Mediterranean-type shrubby vegetation, intermittent freshwater marshes, and seasonally flooded agricultural land.
