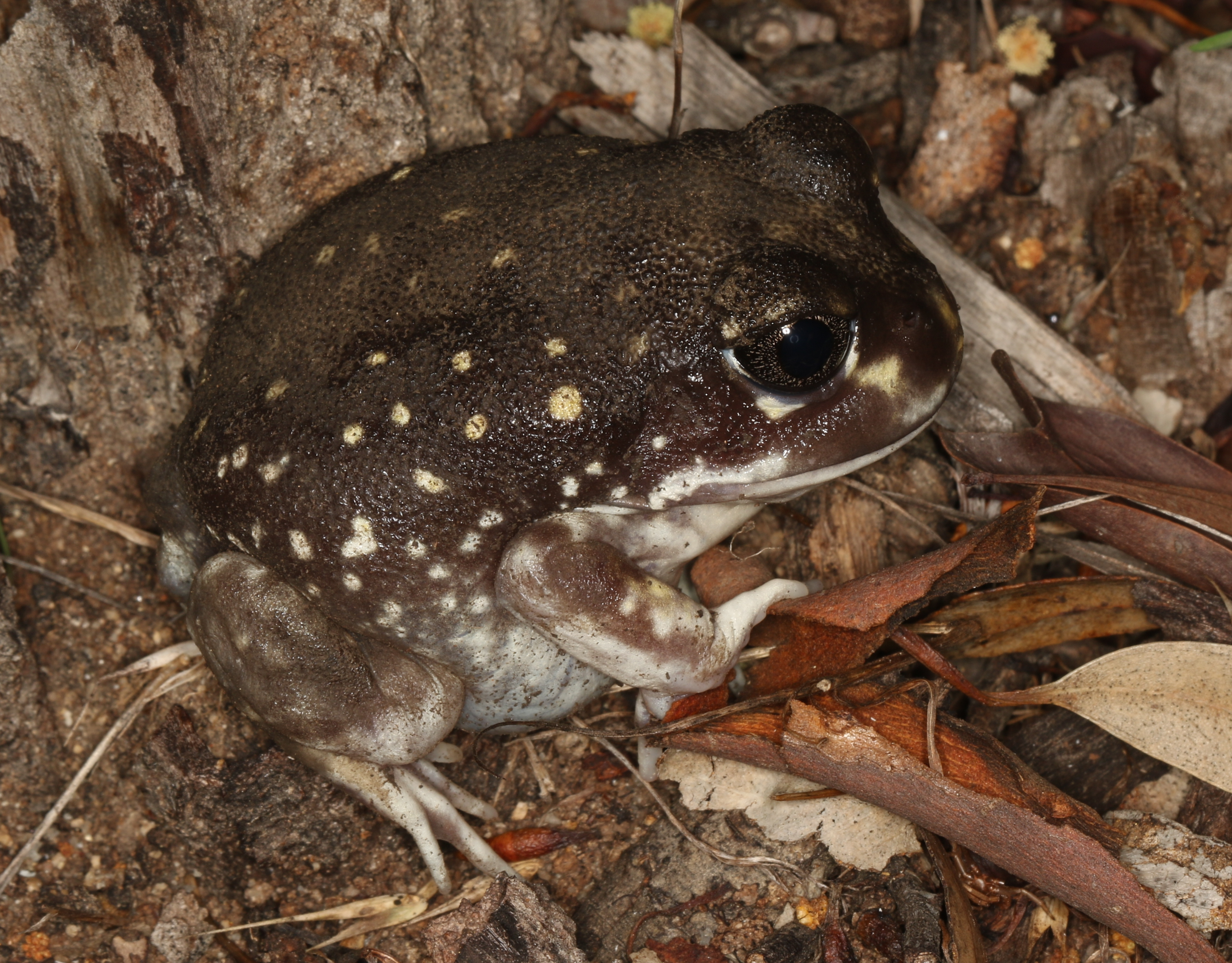
- Western spotted frog (Heleioporus albopunctatus)

Scientific classification
- Kingdom: Animalia
- Phylum: Chordata
- Class: Amphibia
- Order: Anura
- Superfamily: Myobatrachoidea
- Family: Limnodynastidae; Lynch, 1969

Genera
- See text

= Limnodynastidae =

Limnodynastidae Temporal range: Early Eocene to present

Family of amphibians

Limnodynastidae, commonly known as the Australian ground frogs, is a family of frogs found in Australia, New Guinea, and the Aru Islands. They were formerly considered a subfamily of the Myobatrachidae, the other large radiation of terrestrial frogs in Australia, but are now considered a distinct family. Both Limnodynastidae and Myobatrachidae are thought to be the only members of the superfamily Myobatrachoidea.

The earliest fossils of this group are of Platypectrum casca from the Early Eocene.

== Taxonomy ==
The following genera are recognised in the family Limnodynastidae:

Species	Common name	Genus
1	Tusked frogs	Adelotus Ogilby, 1907
6	Giant burrowing frogs	Heleioporus Gray, 1841
11	Australian swamp frogs	Limnodynastes Fitzinger, 1843
9	Stubby frogs	Neobatrachus Peters, 1863
4	Australian spadefoot toads	Notaden Günther, 1873
7	Mountain frogs	Philoria Spencer, 1901
6	Cannibal frogs (in part)	Platyplectrum Günther, 1863
