= Angus Anderson Martin =

Australian herpetologist

- Born: 1940 (age 85–86)
- Scientific career
- Fields: Herpetology
- Workplaces: University of Melbourne

Angus Anderson Martin (born 1940) is an Australian herpetologist.

He worked at the University of Melbourne. He was chairman of Department and Reader in Ecology from 1984. He headed the Department of Zoology.

== Taxa named in his honor ==
- Uperoleia martini

== Selected taxa described ==
- Crinia bilingua
- Crinia riparia
- Cyclorana cryptotis
- Cyclorana longipes
- Cyclorana maculosa
- Cyclorana maini
- Cyclorana vagitus
- Cyclorana verrucosa
- Limnodynastes lignarius
- Litoria brevipalmata
- Litoria pallida
- Litoria personata
- Litoria splendida
- Litoria tyleri
- Neobatrachus aquilonius
- Uperoleia arenicola
- Uperoleia aspera
- Uperoleia borealis
- Uperoleia crassa
- Uperoleia inundata
- Uperoleia lithomoda
- Uperoleia micromeles
- Uperoleia minima
- Uperoleia talpa
- Uperoleia trachyderma
