= Kimberley tropical savanna =

Terrestrial ecoregion in Western Australia

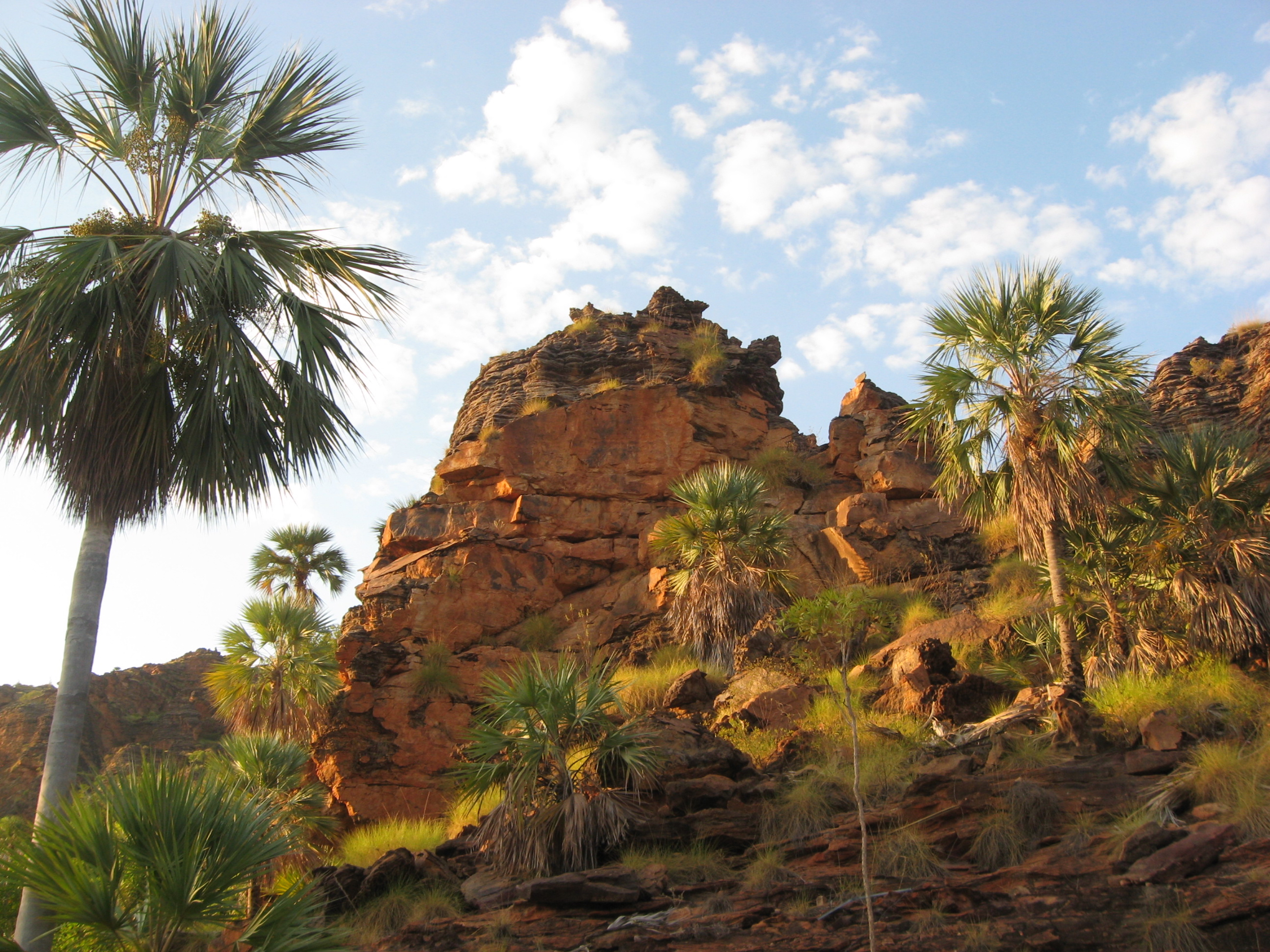
- Keep River National Park, Northern Territory

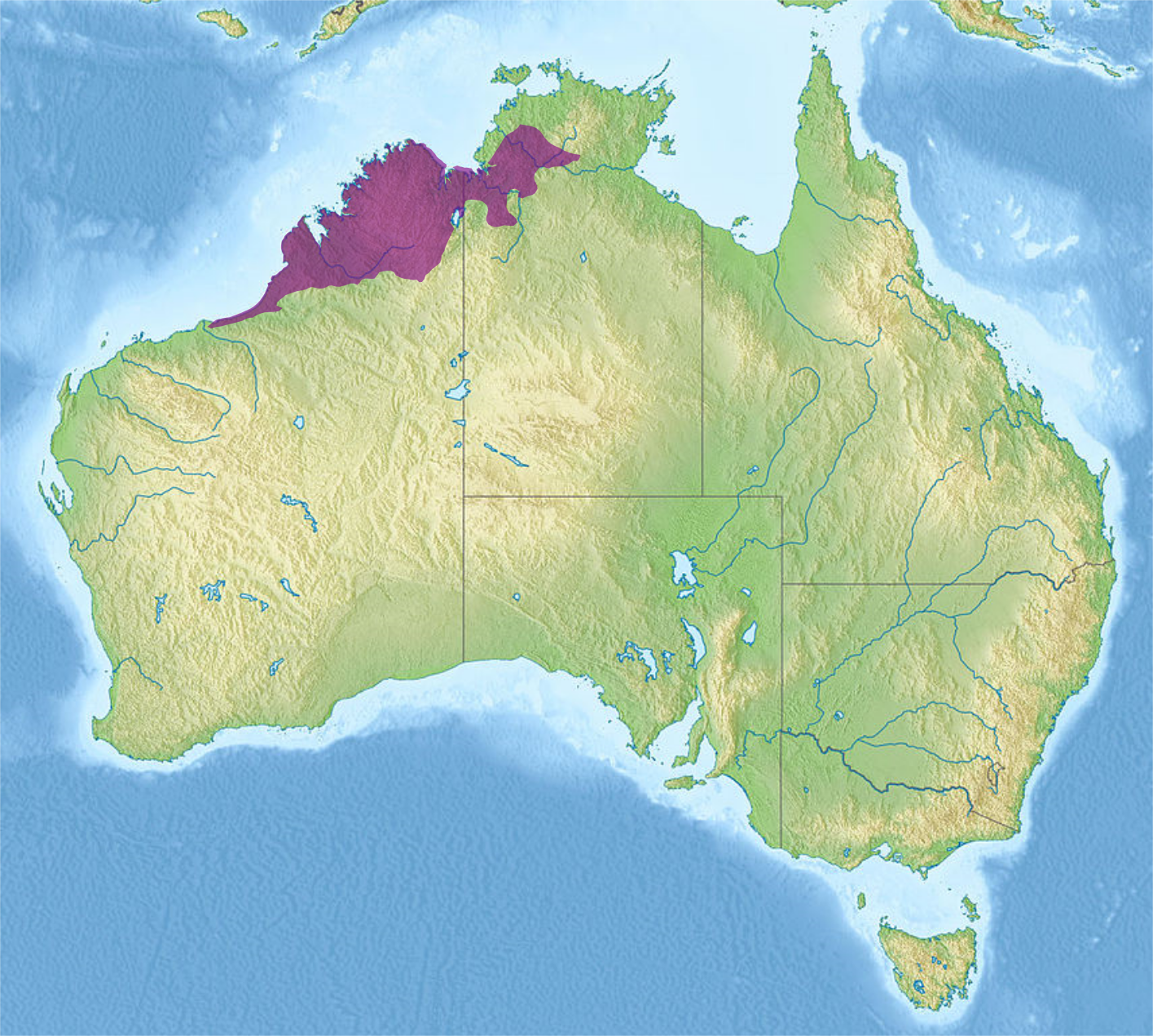
- Ecoregion territory (in purple)

Ecology
- Realm: Australasian
- Biome: tropical and subtropical grasslands, savannas, and shrublands
- Borders: Arnhem Land tropical savanna; Carpentaria tropical savanna; Great Sandy-Tanami desert, Victoria Plains tropical savanna

Geography
- Area: 335,299 km^{2} (129,460 sq mi)
- Country: Australia
- States: Northern Territory; Western Australia
- Coordinates: 16.45°S 126.5°E

Conservation
- Conservation status: Vulnerable
- Protected: 84,546 km² (25%)

The Kimberley tropical savanna is a tropical and subtropical grasslands, savannas, and shrublands ecoregion in northwestern Australia, covering portions of Western Australia and the Northern Territory south of the Timor Sea.

== Geography ==
The ecoregion lies in Northwestern coastal Australia, including the Kimberley region of Western Australia and extending into the Northern Territory.

It is bounded on the north by the Timor Sea. The Arnhem Land tropical savanna ecoregion lies to the northeast, the Carpentaria tropical savanna lies to the east, and the Victoria Plains tropical savanna ecoregion lies to the southeast and south. The Great Sandy-Tanami desert ecoregion lies to the southeast.

Much of the ecoregion has rugged terrain of Proterozoic sandstone. The Northern Kimberley coast is generally steep with many offshore islets.

Rivers in the ecoregion include the Fitzroy, May, Drysdale, Durack, Ord, Victoria, Katherine, Flora and Daly. Rivers and streams often follow sandstone fault blocks, eroding dramatic gorges.

Some coastal areas of the Northern Kimberly are formed of basalt, and the Mitchell Plateau and Bougainville Peninsula are overlain by a layer of bauxitic duricrust.

The southern Dampierland region, which includes the Dampier Peninsula and the coastal plain extending to the southwest, are on deposits of red sand. The topography of Dampierland is mostly gentle, with coastal dunes and lagoons.

=== IBRA regions ===
The ecoregion includes five IBRA regions – Central Kimberley, Daly Basin, Dampierland, Northern Kimberley, and Victoria Bonaparte.

== Climate ==
The ecoregion has a tropical savanna climate. Temperatures are high throughout the year, and monthly maximum averages range from 25º to 35º C. Rainfall is highly seasonal, occurring with the summer monsoons from October to March, followed by a long dry season during the rest of the year. Rainfall is highest in the coastal north of the ecoregion, and lower in the south and towards the interior. The Mitchell Plateau in the north receives 1,400 mm annually, while Broome in the southwest receives around 600 mm.

== Flora ==
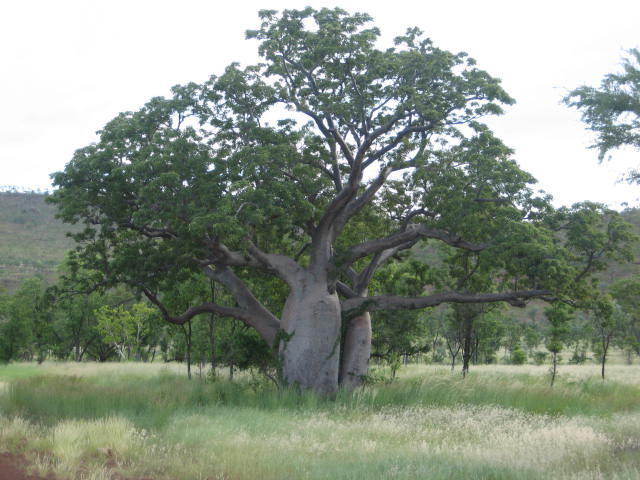
A boab tree in February

The vegetation is mostly savanna and open woodland, which vary in species composition with rainfall, underlying soils, and exposure to fires. Other vegetation types include wetlands and enclaves of monsoon rainforest.

=== Woodlands and savannas ===
Woodland of bloodwood eucalypts (Corymbia spp.) is widespread on sand and loam soils. Boab (Adansonia gregorii) is a distinctive woodland tree that favours sandy soils. Darwin stringybark (Eucalyptus tetrodonta) and Darwin woollybutt (E. miniata) predominate where soils are richer and rainfall is higher. The trees are evergreen and form an open canopy 5 to 15 metres high. The understory is mostly tall grass, with species of Sorghum, Heteropogon, Themeda, Chrysopogon, Aristida, and Eriachne. In parts of Northern Kimberly, the palm Livistona eastonii forms a dense sub-canopy in the woodlands.

River valley lowlands with fine-textured clay and clay-loam soils are home to open woodlands characterized by trees of the genera Terminalia and Bauhinia, and grasslands of Chrysopogon, Aristida, and Dichanthium, with species of Xerochloa in wetter areas. Many of these woodlands and grasslands have been converted to farmland.

=== Pindan ===
Pindan is a plant community found on the Dampier Peninsula and elsewhere the southwestern portion of the ecoregion, typically in areas with red sandy soils. Pindan is a low-canopied open woodland with trees 3 to 8 meters high. The dominant species are wattle, including Acacia eriopoda, A. tumida, A. platycarpa, and A. colei. Occasional bloodwoods emerge above the wattle canopy.

=== Monsoon rainforests ===
Pockets of monsoon rainforest are found on scattered sites, generally within 150 km of the coast. There are approximately 1500 monsoon rainforest patches totaling 7,000 hectares (ha). The average patch is less than four hectares. Only 3% exceed 20 ha, and the largest is 200 ha. Monsoon rainforest is composed of semi-deciduous or deciduous trees which lose their leaves towards the end of the dry season ("raingreen"). Woody vines are common, and they climb into the tree canopies; lower-canopied monsoon rainforests are also known as monsoon vine thickets. Understory plants include low trees, shrubs and vines. Monsoon rainforest is generally fire-intolerant, in contrast to the surrounding savanna and woodlands which are adapted to frequent fires. Trees and shrubs of the monsoon rainforest often have fleshy fruits, which are eaten and dispersed by birds, bats, and mammals. Monsoon rainforests are found behind coastal dunes, on hillsides and scree slopes, at the edges of swamps and rivers, and in gorges and gullies. Rainforests have a distinct flora from the adjacent savannas and woodlands, with many ancient Gondwanian plants, along with plants characteristic of the Australasian and Indomalayan tropics.

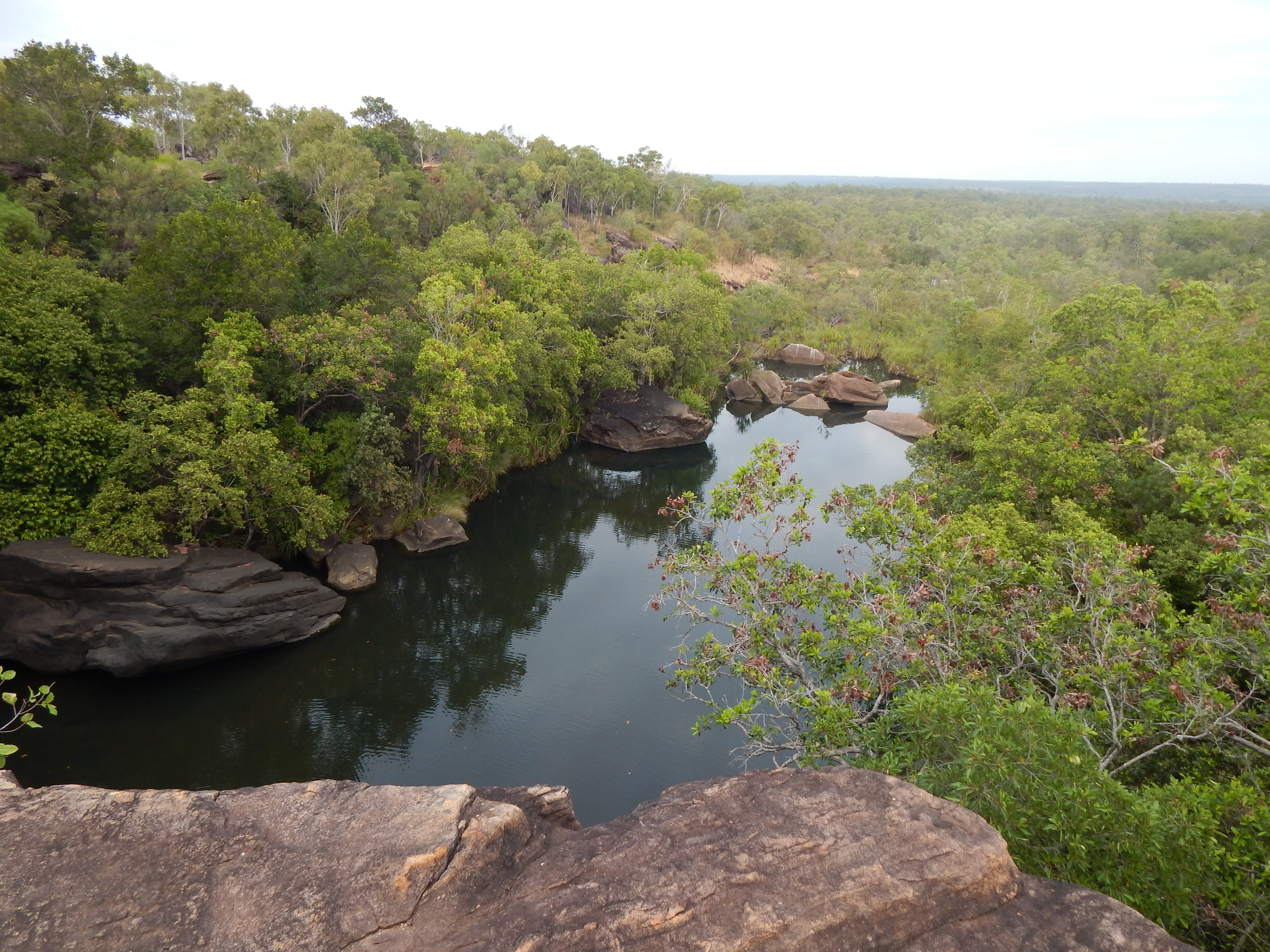
Little Mertens Falls on the Mitchell Plateau

In Northern Kimberley, monsoon rainforests are common on scree slopes at the bottom of escarpments, and at the edges of freshwater swamps and mangroves. They are most extensive on basalt slopes at the foot of the laterite plateaus that top the Mitchell Plateau and Bougainville Peninsula. Mixed evergreen, semi-evergreen, and deciduous trees form a canopy 15–20 meters in height, crowned by emergent trees. Monsoon rainforest trees in the Northern Kimberley include Aglaia elaeagnoidea, Albizia lebbeck, Brachychiton diversifolius, Brachychiton xanthophyllus, Bombax ceiba, Dysoxylum latifolium, Ficus (F. congesta, F. geniculata var. insignis, F. hispida var. hispida, F. racemosa var. racemosa, and F. virens var. virens), Ganophyllum falcatum, Garuga floribunda, Grewia breviflora, Litsea glutinosa, Miliusa brahei, Mimusops elengi, Monoon australe, Myristica insipida, Sterculia quadrifida, Terminalia ferdinandiana, Terminalia microcarpa, Terminalia petiolaris, Wrightia pubescens, and Ziziphus quadrilocularis. Woody vines are profuse, and climb into the tree canopies. Small trees and shrubs make up the understory, and include Alectryon kimberleyanus, Denhamia obscura, Glycosmis microphylla, Glycosmis trifoliata, Grewia glabra, Micromelum minutum, Murraya paniculata, Strychnos lucida, and Trema tomentosa. Trees found at the edges of rainforest patches include Acacia holoserica, boab (Adansonia gregorii), helicopter tree (Gyrocarpus americanus), and Antidesma ghaesembilla.

The monsoon vine forests of the northern Dampier Peninsula grow up to 12 meters in height. Common trees include Terminalia petiolaris, mangarr (Sersalisia sericea), banyan fig (Ficus virens var. virens), Ficus geniculata var. insignis, wild apple (Syzygium eucalyptoides subsp. bleeseri), with gubinge (Terminalia ferdinandiana) growing on the landward fringe. There are localized populations of Cupaniopsis anacardioides, Diospyros maritima, D. rugulosa, Pittosporum moluccanum, Trophis scandens, and Vitex glabrata.

Coastal monsoon vine thickets extend from the Dampier Peninsula as far south as Broome, in areas with 600 mm or more of annual rainfall. They are found in small, usually linear patches along the leeward side of dunes, sustained by a shallow aquifer. The endemic Cable Beach bloodwood (Corymbia paractia) is a characteristic tree, along with Goonj (Celtis philippensis), Croton habrophyllus, broad-leaved ballart (Exocarpos latifolius), karnbor (Melaleuca dealbata), marool or blackberry tree (Terminalia petiolaris), and mamajen (Mimusops elengi). Vines include Capparis lasiantha, Gymnanthera oblonga, Parsonsia kimberleyensis, stinking passionflower (Passiflora foetida), snake vine (Tinospora smilacina), and Secamone elliptica. The vine thickets often transition to pindan further inland.

=== Riparian forests ===
Riparian forests line rivers and streams. Common riparian trees include river red gum (Eucalyptus camaldulensis), Terminalia platyphylla, Nauclea orientalis, Melaleuca leucadendra, and species of Ficus, Alphitonia, Calophyllum, Canarium, Cryptocarya, Myristica, and Syzygium. Understory shrubs include Pandanus aquaticus, P. spiralis, Antidesma, and Drypetes. Vines aren't as profuse as in the monsoon rainforests, but the non-native stinking passionflower is abundant in some areas. The riparian forests include many rainforest tree and shrub species with fleshy fruits. These are an important food source for wildlife, and the forests also provide habitat and shelter for many animals.

== Fauna ==
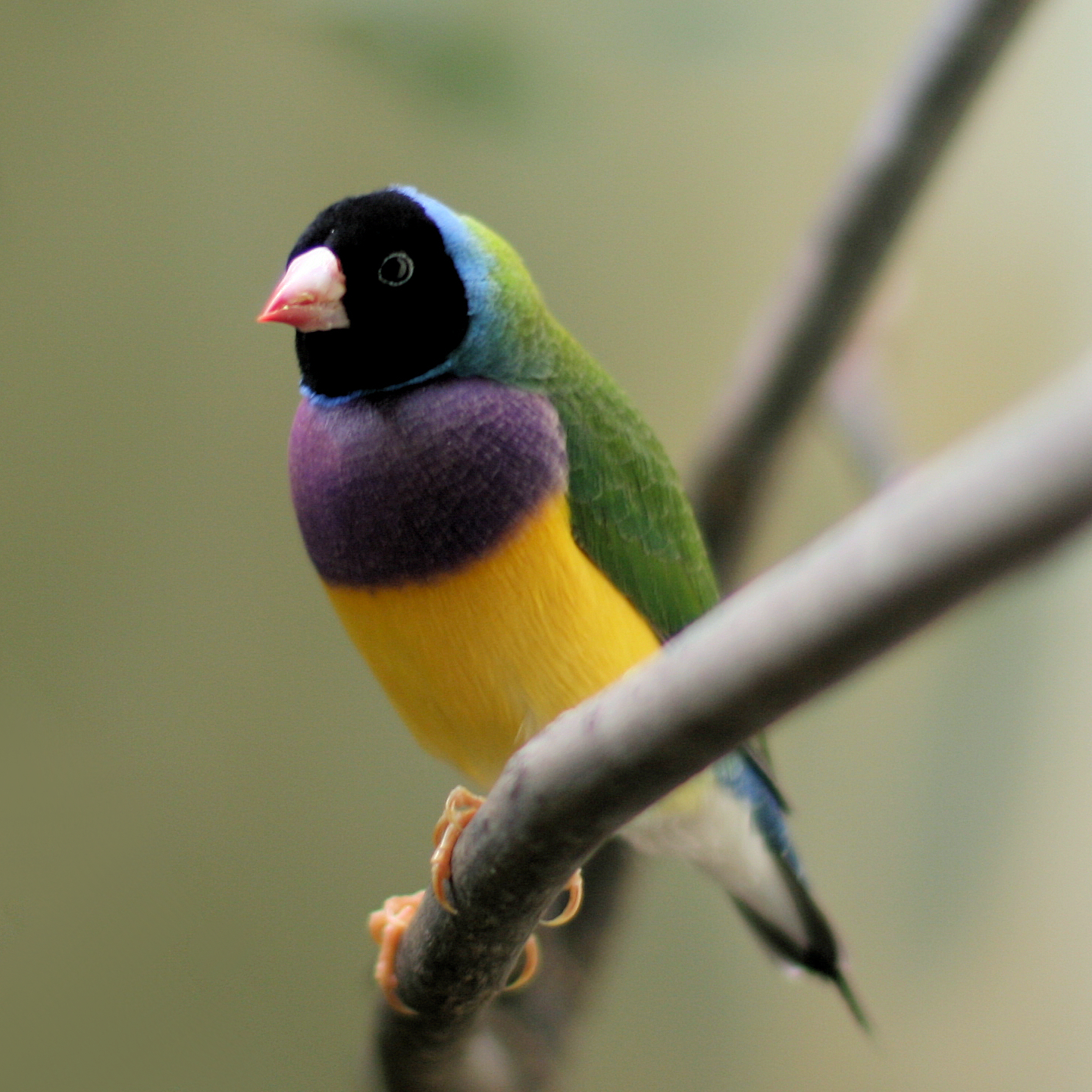
Gouldian finch (Erythrura gouldiae)

About 230 species of plants are endemic to the ecoregion, along with six endemic species of mammals, two endemic bird species, 31 endemic reptile species, and 16 endemic fish species.

Native mammals include the agile wallaby (Macropus agilis), common wallaroo (Osphranter robustus), antilopine kangaroo (Osphranter antilopinus), northern quoll (Dasyurus hallucatus), bilby (Macrotis lagotis), short-beaked echidna (Tachyglossus aculeatus), northern brushtail possum (Trichosurus arnhemensis), common brushtail possum (Trichosurus vulpecula), rock-haunting ringtail possum (Petropseudes dahli), sugar glider (Petaurus breviceps), and pale field rat (Rattus tunneyi). The golden bandicoot (Isoodon auratus) and golden-backed tree-rat (Mesembriomys macrurus) were once widespread in the ecoregion, but are now limited to Northern Kimberley. The boodie or burrowing bettong (Bettongia lesueur), a formerly-native kangaroo, is now extinct from the ecoregion. The six endemic mammals are the Ningbing false antechinus (Pseudantechinus ningbing), scaly-tailed possum (Wyulda squamicaudata), monjon (Petrogale burbidgei), yellow-lipped bat (Vespadelus douglasorum), Kimberley mouse (Pseudomys laborifex), and Kimberley rock rat (Zyzomys woodwardi). Windjana Gorge, Tunnel Creek, and Geikie Gorge have extensive cave systems that support large bat colonies.

The black grasswren (Amytornis housei) and white-quilled rock pigeon (Petrophassa albipennis) are endemic. The black grasswren lives in hummock grasslands in the sandstone hills of Northern Kimberley. The ecoregion is home to the near-threatened Gouldian finch (Erythrura gouldiae). The purple-crowned fairywren (Malurus coronatus) is threatened by habitat loss, as its riparian habitat, particularly along the Ord and Fitzroy rivers, has been trampled by cattle and converted to agriculture.

The ecoregion's wetlands are important habitats for migratory and resident water birds. Glossy ibis (Plegadis falcinellus) and magpie goose (Anseranas semipalmata) are the most abundant. The Ord River Floodplain and Parry Creek floodplain, Eighty Mile Beach, and Roebuck Bay are Ramsar sites. Lakes Argyle and Kununurra are artificial reservoirs on the Ord River which have become important dry-season refuges for birds. The rocky northern coast and offshore islands are home to colony breeding sites for herons, cormorants, and other seabirds.

The endemic lizards include seven species of geckoes (Diplodactylus mcmillani, Gehyra occidentalis, G. xenopus, Oedura filicipoda, O. gracilis, Amalosia obscura and Pseudothecadactylus cavaticus), four agamid lizards (Diporiphora convergens, D. pindan, D. superba, and Pogona microlepidota), and 13 skinks (Carlia johnstonei, Ctenotus burbidgei, C. mastigura, C. tantillus, C. decaneurus yampiensis, Egernia douglasi, Eremiascincus brongersmai, Lerista apoda, L. borealis, L. kalumburu, L. separanda, L. walkeri, and Cyclodomorphus maximus). Endemic snakes are the rough-scaled python (Morelia carinata), Kimberley deep-soil blind snake (Anilios howi), Small-eyed blind snake (A. micromma), Sandamara blind snake (A. troglodytes), Yampi blind snake (A. yampiensis), Ord curl snake (Sula ordensis), and Simoselaps minimus.

The endemic frogs include flat-headed frog (Limnodynastes depressus), cave-dwelling frog (Ranoidea cavernicola), magnificent tree frog (Ranoidea splendida), Derby toadlet (Uperoleia aspera), small toadlet (U. minima), fat toadlet (U. crassa), marbled toadlet (U. marmorata), Mjoberg's toadlet (U. mjobergi), and mole toadlet (U. talpa).

== Conservation and threats ==
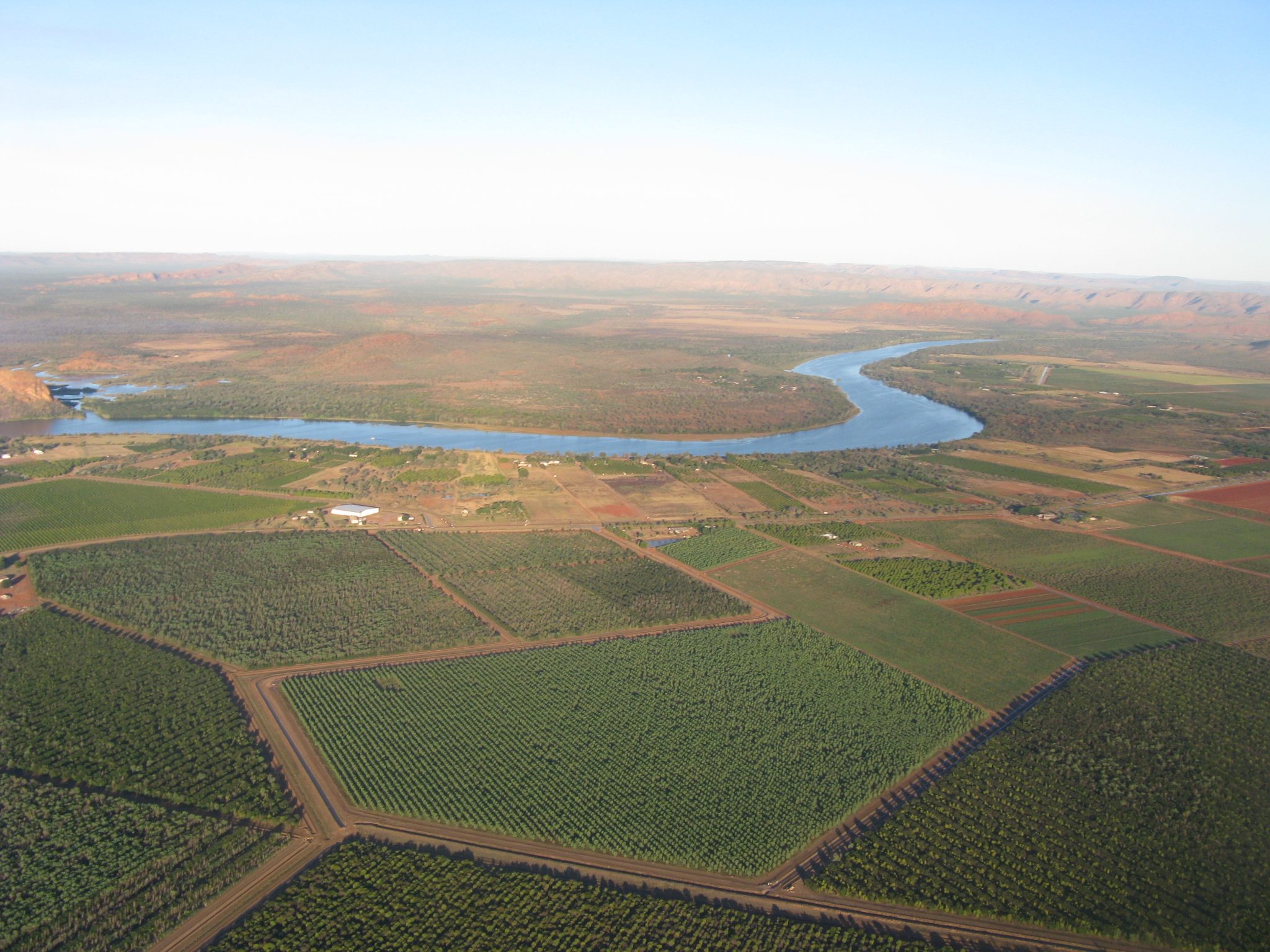
Sandalwood plantation in the Ord River valley

Threats to the ecoregion's wildlife include: habitat loss from converting land to agriculture and pasture; trampling and overgrazing by livestock cattle and feral cattle, donkeys, pigs, and rabbits; changes to the fire regime from replacing Aboriginal fire practices (small, frequent, and deliberately-set small fires) with widespread fire suppression resulting in larger late-season fires; and the introduction of exotic predators including house cats and foxes. Several introduced plants have become widespread weeds, displacing native plants and disrupting the region's fire and hydrologic cycles and food sources for native animals. These plants include rough cocklebur (Xanthium strumarium), parkinsonia (Parkinsonia aculeata), bellyache bush (Jatropha gossypifolia), castor bean plant (Ricinus communis), and stinking passionflower (Passiflora foetida).

== Protected areas ==
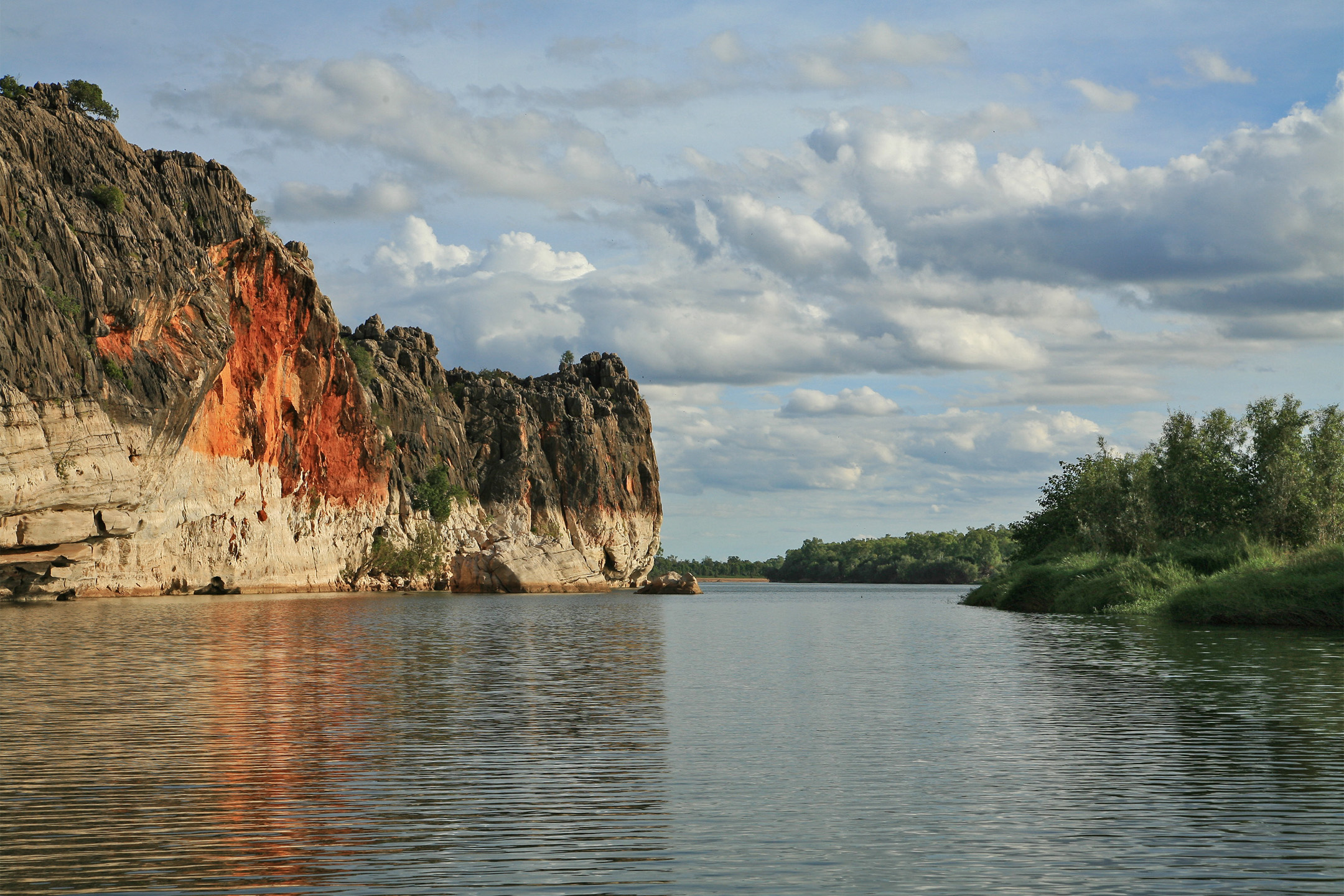
Danggu Gorge National Park

A 2017 assessment found that 84,546 km², or 25%, of the ecoregion is in protected areas but less than 10% is in IUCN Cat 1 & 2 protected areas. Protected areas in the ecoregion include Drysdale River National Park, Keep River National Park, Mitchell River National Park, Prince Regent National Park, Danggu Gorge National Park, Mirima National Park, Wunaamin Miliwundi Ranges Conservation Park, Ord River Nature Reserve, Charnley River–Artesian Range Sanctuary, Marion Downs Sanctuary, Mornington Sanctuary, Tableland Wildlife Sanctuary, and the northern and western portions of Gregory National Park.

Indigenous protected areas (IPAs) in the ecoregion include Nyangumarta Warrarn Indigenous Protected Area, Yawuru Indigenous Protected Area (Yawuru people), Bardi Jawi Indigenous Protected Area (Bardi Jawi peoples), Dambimangari Indigenous Protected Area (Dambimangari peoples), Karajarri Indigenous Protected Area, Uunguu Indigenous Protected Area (Uunguu people), Wilinggin Indigenous Protected Area (Wilinggin people), Balanggarra Indigenous Protected Area (Balanggarra peoples), and Wardaman Indigenous Protected Area (Wardaman people).
