= Gurrumul's toadlet =

Scientific classification
- Kingdom: Animalia
- Phylum: Chordata
- Class: Amphibia
- Order: Anura
- Family: Myobatrachidae
- Genus: Uperoleia
- Species: U. gurrumuli

Binomial name
- Uperoleia gurrumuli Catullo & Keogh, 2021

Species of frog

Gurrumul's toadlet (Uperoleia gurrumuli) is a species of frog in the family Myobatrachidae. It is endemic to the Wessel Islands of the Northern Territory, Australia. It is only known from 3 specimens (one female and two juveniles) collected in 1993 and was found to be a distinct species via genetic analysis, and thus little is known about its diagnostic features from other Uperoleia species. It can be distinguished from the stonemason's toadlet (U. lithomoda) by its rounded inguinal glands, but appears physically identical to the flood plain toadlet (U. inundata).

It was named in honor of Yolngu musician Geoffrey Gurrumul Yunupingu.
