= Blacksoil toadlet =

Conservation status
- Least Concern (IUCN 3.1)

Scientific classification
- Kingdom: Animalia
- Phylum: Chordata
- Class: Amphibia
- Order: Anura
- Family: Myobatrachidae
- Genus: Uperoleia
- Species: U. trachyderma

Binomial name
- Uperoleia trachyderma Tyler, Davies & Martin, 1981
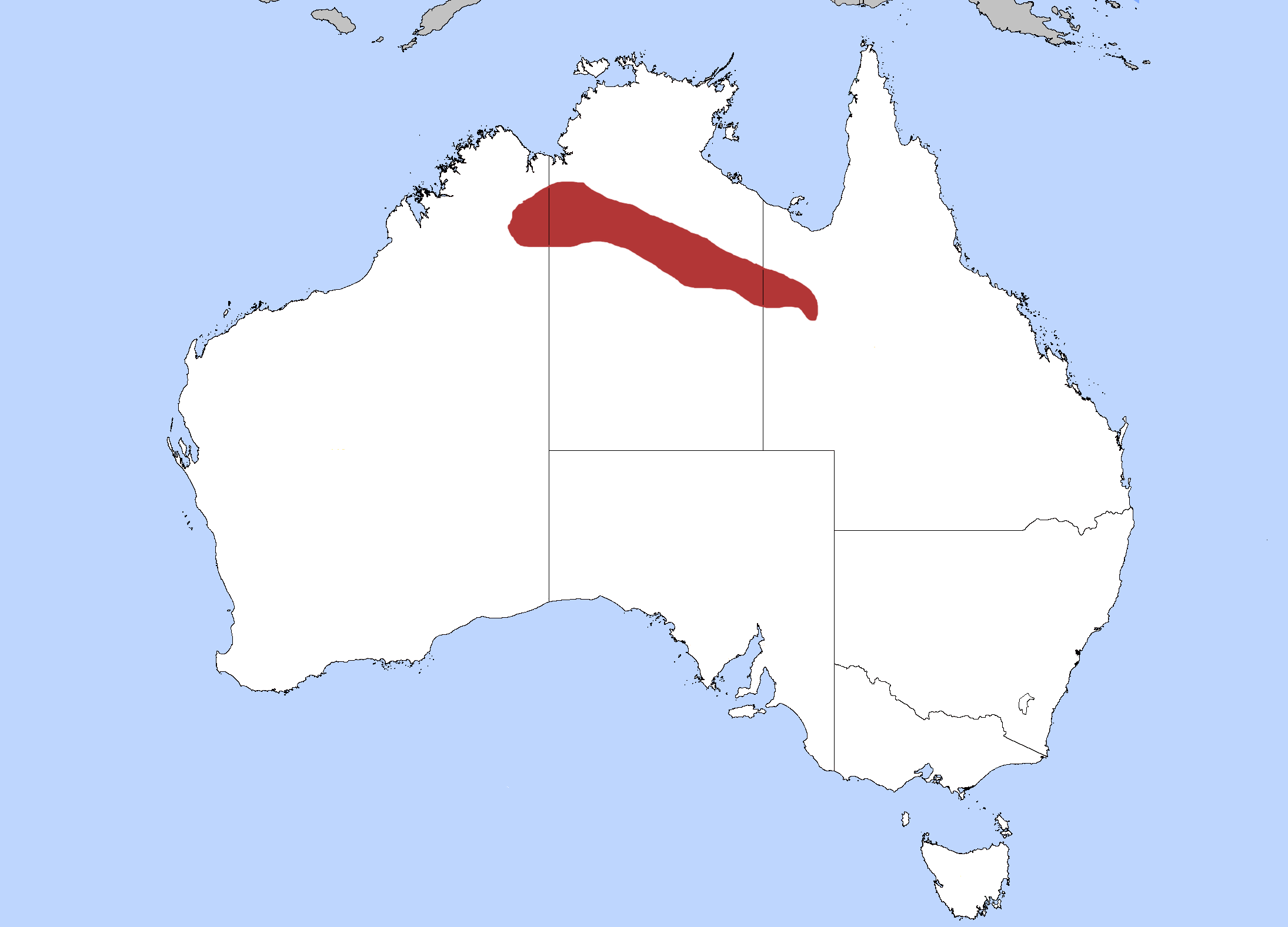
- Distribution of the blacksoil toadlet

Species of frog

The blacksoil toadlet (Uperoleia trachyderma) is a species of frog in the family Myobatrachidae. It is endemic to Australia. Its natural habitats are subtropical or tropical dry lowland grassland, subtropical or tropical seasonally wet or flooded lowland grassland, and intermittent freshwater marshes.

== Taxonomy ==
The species was split in 2014, with the populations in the western part of the range, including all those in Western Australia, being assigned to a new species, the ratcheting toadlet (Uperoleia stridera).
