= Masked frog (disambiguation) =

The masked frog (Litoria personata) is a species of frog in the family Hylidae endemic to Australia.

Masked frog may also refer to:

- Masked mountain frog (Philoria loveridgei), a frog in the family Myobatrachidae endemic to Australia
- Masked swamp frog (Limnonectes paramacrodon), a frog in the family Dicroglossidae found in Malay Peninsula (Malaysia, Singapore, and southernmost Thailand), Borneo (Brunei, Indonesia, Malaysia), and Natuna Besar, Indonesia
- Masked tree frog (Smilisca phaeota), a frog in the family Hylidae found in Colombia, Costa Rica, Ecuador, Honduras, Nicaragua, and Panama

== See also ==
Masked rough-sided frog (disambiguation), one or two species in the genus Hylarana
