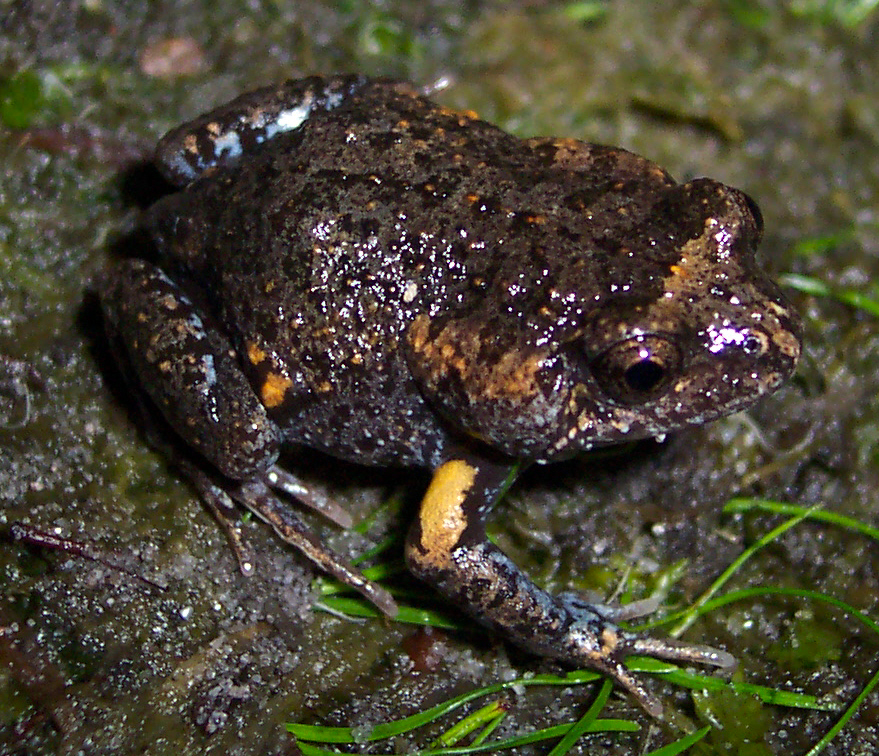

Conservation status
- Near Threatened (IUCN 3.1)

Scientific classification
- Kingdom: Animalia
- Phylum: Chordata
- Class: Amphibia
- Order: Anura
- Family: Myobatrachidae
- Genus: Uperoleia
- Species: U. tyleri

Binomial name
- Uperoleia tyleri Davies and Littlejohn, 1986
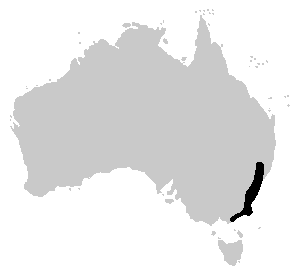
- Range of the Tyler's toadlet

= Tyler's toadlet =

Species of amphibian

Tyler's toadlet (Uperoleia tyleri) is a species of ground frog that is found in coastal areas in southern New South Wales and eastern Victoria.

== Etymology ==
The specific name tyleri honours Michael J. Tyler, an Australian herpetologist.

== Description ==
This is a large frog (for its genus), up to about 35mm. It is dark to light brown with some orange/yellow spotting on the dorsal surface. A pale crown is present on the head of this species, however is less distinct than in U. fusca and U. laevigata. It has large parotoid glands. There is a pale yellow patch in the armpits. The ventral surface of this species is fully pigmented dark blue/black. The thigh patch is yellow in colour. This species is very similar to the smooth toadlet.

== Ecology and behaviour ==
This species is associated with dams and swamps in heathland, forest and cleared land. Its distribution is not fully determined. It has a solid distribution south of Jervis Bay Territory and there are some populations between Jervis Bay and Sydney, there are records for this species north of Sydney, however similarities with other Uperoleia frogs may have led to mis-identification. Males make a deep, drawn out "arrrrk" call from spring to autumn around the breeding site, males often call many metres away from water.
