= Howard Springs toadlet =

Conservation status
- Endangered (IUCN 3.1)

Scientific classification
- Kingdom: Animalia
- Phylum: Chordata
- Class: Amphibia
- Order: Anura
- Family: Myobatrachidae
- Genus: Uperoleia
- Species: U. daviesae

Binomial name
- Uperoleia daviesae Young, Tyler & Kent, 2005

Species of Australian frog

The Howard Springs toadlet (Uperoleia daviesae), also known as the Howard River toadlet, Davies's toadlet or the Darwin sandsheet frog, is a species of small frog that is endemic to Australia. The specific epithet daviesae honours Australian herpetologist Margaret M. Davies.

== Description ==
The species grows to about 25 mm in length (SVL). The upper body is grey to grey-brown. The belly is pale pink, speckled white. The throat of the male is dark grey. The fingers are unwebbed; the toes only slightly webbed. The backs of the thighs and groin are red to orange. The call of species is short and raspy.

== Behaviour ==
Breeding takes place during the wet season. Eggs are attached singly to submerged vegetation in shallow pools and flooded grassland.

== Distribution and habitat ==
The species' known range is limited to the vicinity of Howard Springs, some 30 km south-east of the city of Darwin in the tropical Top End of Australia's Northern Territory. There the frogs inhabit sandplain heathland, within the Howard and Elizabeth River catchments, that is inundated during the wet season.
