= Bilingual frog =

Conservation status
- Least Concern (IUCN 3.1)

Scientific classification
- Kingdom: Animalia
- Phylum: Chordata
- Class: Amphibia
- Order: Anura
- Family: Myobatrachidae
- Genus: Crinia
- Species: C. bilingua

Binomial name
- Crinia bilingua (Martin, Tyler & Davies, 1980)

Species of amphibian

The bilingual frog (Crinia bilingua) is a species of frog in the family Myobatrachidae. It is endemic to Australia. Its natural habitats are moist savanna, intermittent rivers, and swamps.
