= Marbled toadlet =

Conservation status
- Data Deficient (IUCN 3.1)

Scientific classification
- Domain: Eukaryota
- Kingdom: Animalia
- Phylum: Chordata
- Class: Amphibia
- Order: Anura
- Family: Myobatrachidae
- Genus: Uperoleia
- Species: U. marmorata

Binomial name
- Uperoleia marmorata Gray, 1841
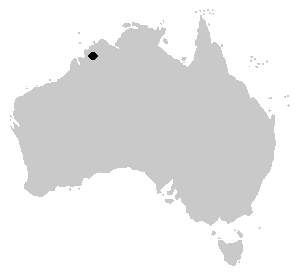
- The area in which the holotype of the marbled toadlet was found

Species of amphibian

Uperoleia marmorata commonly known as the marbled toadlet, is only known by the holotype collected in the Kimberley region of Western Australia by Gray in 1841.

== Description ==
Gray describe the frog as "…black and green marbled, leaving a triangular greenish spot on its forehead, beneath lead colour". This species is likely to have other features similar to other Uperoleia species such as: red-orange patches in the groin and behind the knees, tubercles and large parotoid glands as well as a granular belly. The frog is likely to be about 30 mm in length.

This frog most likely resembles the Mjoberg's toadlet (Uperoleia mjobergi), as they inhabit similar areas it is possible to speculate that the holotype of the marbled toadlet was mistake for a Mjoberg's toadlet.

== Ecology and behaviour ==
Due to lack of records on this species habitat and behavioural characteristics have been difficult to assess. The frog is likely to breed in permanent and semi-permanent still water bodies in the Kimberly region.

This species was once thought to be widespread across eastern New South Wales, but due to the similarity of frogs within the genus Uperoleia it was most likely confused with smooth toadlet.
