= Margaret M. Davies =

Australian herpetologist

Margaret Davies OAM
- Born: 8 November 1944 (age 82); Australia
- Education: University of Tasmania (BSc); Australian National University (MSc, PhD)
- Scientific career
- Fields: Herpetologist
- Workplaces: University of Adelaide, Australia

Margaret Davies is an Australian herpetologist born on 8 November 1944. She worked at the University of Adelaide studying Australian frogs, retiring in 2002. Initially appointed to a teaching post at the university, she was inspired to research frog taxonomy and their ecology from the 1970s. She identified over 30 new species of frogs during her career. She has contributed to over 120 publications.

== Education ==
In 1966 Davies graduated with a bachelor's degree from University of Tasmania and then gained a master's degree from Australian National University in Canberra. Her doctorate was awarded by University of Adelaide for work on the genus Uperoleia.

== Awards and honours ==
In 1996 she received the Dean’s Certificate for Excellence in Teaching in the discipline of zoology from the University of Adelaide.

She is an Honorary Fellow of the Royal Society of South Australia (serving on its council for 26 years) and was given Life membership of the Australian Society of Herpetologists for her service and contributions.

In 2014 she was awarded the Medal of the Order of Australia for services to science in the field of herpetology.

In 2015 she was made a member of the Tasmanian Honour Roll of Women.

The species Davies' toadlet (Uperoleia daviesae Young, Tyler & Kent, 2005) was named to honour her because her scientific publications have substantially expanded knowledge of the genus Uperoleia.

Litoria daviesae Mahony, Knowles, Foster & Donnellan, 2001 was also named after her.

== Species described ==
- Cophixalus zweifeli
- Crinia bilingua
- Crinia nimbus
- Cyclorana vagitus
- Limnodynastes lignarius
- Litoria cavernicola
- Litoria exophthalmia
- Litoria longirostris
- Litoria lorica
- Litoria pallida
- Litoria personata
- Litoria piperata
- Litoria splendida Magnificent Tree Frog
- Litoria umbonata
- Litoria xanthomera
- Mixophyes hihihorlo
- Neobatrachus aquilonius
- Rheobatrachus vitellinus
- Uperoleia altissima
- Uperoleia arenicola
- Uperoleia aspera
- Uperoleia borealis
- Uperoleia capitulata
- Uperoleia crassa
- Uperoleia fusca
- Uperoleia glandulosa
- Uperoleia inundata
- Uperoleia lithomoda
- Uperoleia littlejohni
- Uperoleia martini
- Uperoleia micromeles
- Uperoleia mimula
- Uperoleia minima
- Uperoleia talpa
- Uperoleia trachyderma
- Uperoleia tyleri

== Personal life ==
Davies is the great-great-granddaughter of John Davies, who co-founded The Mercury.
