= Northern toadlet =

Conservation status
- Least Concern (IUCN 3.1)

Scientific classification
- Kingdom: Animalia
- Phylum: Chordata
- Class: Amphibia
- Order: Anura
- Family: Myobatrachidae
- Genus: Uperoleia
- Species: U. borealis

Binomial name
- Uperoleia borealis Tyler, Davies & Martin, 1981

Species of frog

The northern toadlet (Uperoleia borealis) is a species of frog in the family Myobatrachidae. It is endemic to Australia. Its natural habitats are subtropical or tropical dry shrubland, subtropical or tropical seasonally wet or flooded lowland grassland, intermittent rivers, and intermittent freshwater marshes.

== Distribution ==
The species is found in the north-east of Western Australia and the north-west of the Northern Territory.
