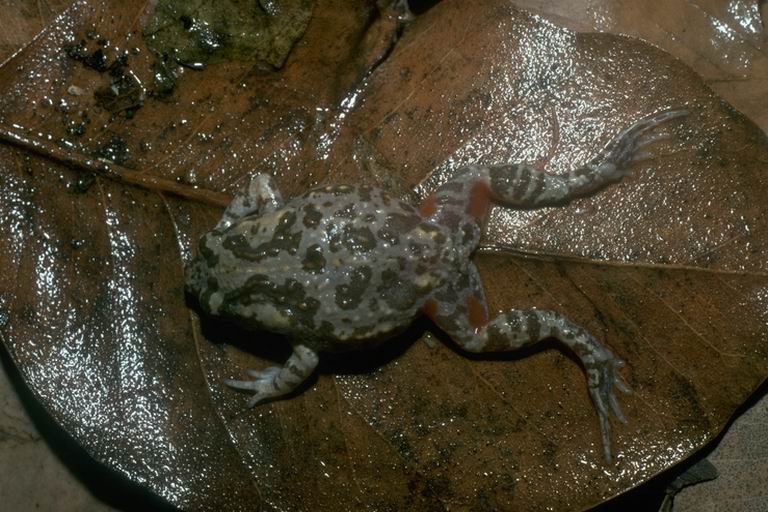

Conservation status
- Least Concern (IUCN 3.1)

Scientific classification
- Kingdom: Animalia
- Phylum: Chordata
- Class: Amphibia
- Order: Anura
- Family: Myobatrachidae
- Genus: Uperoleia
- Species: U. mimula

Binomial name
- Uperoleia mimula Davies, McDonald & Corben, 1986

= Mimic toadlet =

Species of frog

The mimic toadlet (Uperoleia mimula) is a species of frog in the family Myobatrachidae. It is endemic to Australia. Its natural habitats are subtropical or tropical swamps, dry savanna, moist savanna, subtropical or tropical seasonally wet or flooded lowland grassland, intermittent freshwater lakes, and intermittent freshwater marshes.
