= Glandular toadlet =

Conservation status
- Least Concern (IUCN 3.1)

Scientific classification
- Kingdom: Animalia
- Phylum: Chordata
- Class: Amphibia
- Order: Anura
- Family: Myobatrachidae
- Genus: Uperoleia
- Species: U. glandulosa

Binomial name
- Uperoleia glandulosa Davies, Mahony, & Roberts, 1985

Species of frog

The glandular toadlet (Uperoleia glandulosa) is a species of frog in the family Myobatrachidae. It is endemic to the arid coast near the Pilbara in Western Australia. Its natural habitats are subtropical or tropical dry lowland grassland, rivers, intermittent rivers, swamps, intermittent freshwater marshes, and canals and ditches.
