= Cyclorana vagitus =

Conservation status
- Least Concern (IUCN 3.1)

Scientific classification
- Kingdom: Animalia
- Phylum: Chordata
- Class: Amphibia
- Order: Anura
- Family: Pelodryadidae
- Genus: Cyclorana
- Species: C. vagitus

Binomial name
- Cyclorana vagitus Tyler, Davies & Martin, 1981

Synonyms
- Litoria (Cyclorana) vagitus; Cyclorana vagita; Dryopsophus vagitus; Ranoidea vagitus

Species of amphibian

Cyclorana vagitus, the wailing frog, is a species of Australo-Papuan tree frog native to the arid and monsoonal Kimberley (Western Australia) region of Australia. It is a terrestrial and fossorial species, which evades dry periods by burrowing and aestivating- emerging to breed during floods.

It was first described as Cyclorana vagitus in 1981 by Tyler, Davies and Martin. It was transferred to the genus Ranoidea in 2016 by Dubois and Frétey., until Cyclorana was reinstated in 2025.

== Description ==
The back of the frog is brown or grey with darker brown or green markings, underside is white with a granular appearance. The toes are slightly webbed and a dark line extends from the leg to snout. A lighter stripe runs down the back. The call is a repeated wailing or cry. It has a shorter cry and is larger than Cyclorana cultripes.

== Ecology ==
R. vagitus is a terrestrial frog and lacks the arboreal appendages of the similar genus Litoria. Like many Australian frogs, it can burrow and enter a state of aestivation. By hibernating it can avoid the arid conditions of the Kimberley region and emerge to take advantage of the intermittent flooding of its open grassland habitat.

The range of the species is in the far north of Western Australia, overlapping the Northern Territory, in a tropical monsoon climate. It has a description based on the two known locations, which occur in open grassland, in a range of intermittent water sources. It lives from sea level to an altitude of 900 m. Based on the identified groups, population is estimated at 10 000 to 50 000. The males commence breeding by crying at floodways - this is frequently heard - with females responding by releasing up to 1000 eggs during a wet season. The tadpoles develop rapidly before evaporation of the floodwaters.

== Threatened status ==
No threats have been identified and the species is located within a protected area. The species is given a least concern LC status by the IUCN. The species is presumed to be secure due to high populations and wide dispersal in its range. No study of any trends of these has been undertaken.
