= James John Walker =

James John Walker may refer to:

- Jimmy Walker (1881–1946), mayor of New York City, 1926–1932
- James John Walker (entomologist) (1851–1939), English entomologist
- James John Walker (1846–1922), businessman, see J. W. Walker & Sons Ltd, organ makers
