= U. orientalis =

U. orientalis may refer to:

- Udotea orientalis, an alga species in the genus Udotea
- Uperoleia orientalis, the Alexandria toadlet, a frog species endemic to Australia

== See also ==
- Orientalis (disambiguation)
