= Littlejohni =

Littlejohni may refer to:

- Littlejohn's Tree Frog, Litoria littlejohni
- Littlejohn's Toadlet, Uperoleia littlejohni

== See also ==
- Little Johnny
