= Little Johnny (disambiguation) =

Little Johnny may refer to:

- Little Johnny, the fictional subject of a genre of jokes.
- Little Johnny Jones, a musical
- Little Johnny Sheep-Dung, a French fairy tale

== People ==
- Little Johnny Jones (pianist) (1924–1964). Chicago blues pianist and singer.
- John Howard (born 1939), the 25th Prime Minister of Australia. Colloquially known as Little Johnny.
- Little Johnny Taylor (1943–2002), an American blues and soul singer

== Animals ==
- Littlejohn's Tree Frog, Litoria littlejohni
- Littlejohn's Toadlet, Uperoleia littlejohni
