= Tiny toadlet =

Conservation status
- Least Concern (IUCN 3.1)

Scientific classification
- Kingdom: Animalia
- Phylum: Chordata
- Class: Amphibia
- Order: Anura
- Family: Myobatrachidae
- Genus: Uperoleia
- Species: U. micra

Binomial name
- Uperoleia micra Doughty & Roberts, 2008

Species of Australian frog

The tiny toadlet (Uperoleia micra) is a species of small frog that is endemic to Australia. The specific epithet micra refers to its small size.

== Description ==
The species grows to about 20 mm in length (SVL). The upper body is brown with dark spots. The sides of body and head are bluish-grey. The belly is white, speckled grey. The fingers unwebbed, toes partly webbed. The backs of the thighs and groin are orange-red.

== Behaviour ==
Breeding takes place in summer and autumn in the wet season.

== Distribution and habitat ==
The species' known range is limited to the north-west Kimberley region of Western Australia in the tropical north-west of the continent. The area is characterised by rugged sandstone topography and high seasonal rainfall.

== Conservation ==
The species was last assessed by the IUCN in August 2020 when it was classified as Least Concern.
