= Pilbara toadlet =

Scientific classification
- Kingdom: Animalia
- Phylum: Chordata
- Class: Amphibia
- Order: Anura
- Family: Myobatrachidae
- Genus: Uperoleia
- Species: U. saxatilis

Binomial name
- Uperoleia saxatilis Catullo, Doughty, Roberts & Keogh 2011

Species of frog

The tiny Pilbara toadlet (Uperoleia saxatilis)) is a species of frog in the family Myobatrachidae. It is endemic to the arid Pilbara region of Australia. It is a burrowing frog and is found in rocky gorges and creeks in the Pilbara following cyclonic rains. The species name saxatilis means "rock-dwelling".

== Description ==
They are only about 2 centimetres (0.79 in) long with small limbs and a narrow snout. They have large glands and their toes have extensive webbing. They are brown with darker spotting and red femoral patches. They eat termites and small insects they find underground. Males sit in the rocks in places where "they can amplify and direct their call to the females". Their closest relative is thought to be the mole toadlet (Uperoleia talpa), which looks very similar but has a higher-pitched and more intense call.

== Discovery ==
The Pilbara toadlet was recently identified as a new species through DNA analysis by researchers from the Australian National University (ANU) in Canberra, and the Western Australian Museum and University of Western Australia in Perth to differentiate between frog species that look very similar. A doctoral candidate from the ANU, Renee Catullo, said: "The good news is that it appears to be secure from a conservation perspective ... Toadlets are native to Australia and this new species brings the total number to 27, the second-largest group of frog species in the country." The discovery was part of a research project that uses genetic analysis to try to understand the true number of species of toadlets, as DNA can be used to differentiate between very similar species. "They tell themselves apart by their different calls, but we're not so good at that", Catullo said.
