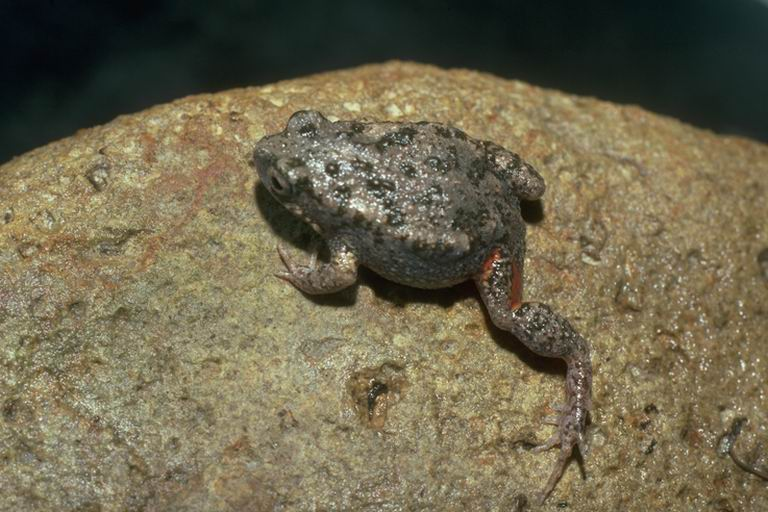

Conservation status
- Least Concern (IUCN 3.1)

Scientific classification
- Kingdom: Animalia
- Phylum: Chordata
- Class: Amphibia
- Order: Anura
- Family: Myobatrachidae
- Genus: Uperoleia
- Species: U. altissima

Binomial name
- Uperoleia altissima Davies, Watson, McDonald, Trenerry, & Werren, 1993

= Montane toadlet =

Species of frog

The montane toadlet (Uperoleia altissima) is a species of frog in the family Myobatrachidae. It is endemic to Australia. Its natural habitats are subtropical or tropical dry forests, dry savanna, moist savanna, rivers, and intermittent rivers. It is threatened by habitat loss.
