= Ratcheting toadlet =

Conservation status
- Least Concern (IUCN 3.1)

Scientific classification
- Kingdom: Animalia
- Phylum: Chordata
- Class: Amphibia
- Order: Anura
- Family: Myobatrachidae
- Genus: Uperoleia
- Species: U. stridera

Binomial name
- Uperoleia stridera Catullo, Doughty & Keogh, 2014

Species of Australian frog

The ratcheting toadlet (Uperoleia stridera) is a species of small frog that is endemic to Australia. The specific epithet stridera, as well as the common name, refer to the grating nature of the call.

== Taxonomy ==
The ratcheting toadlet was split in 2014 from the blacksoil toadlet (Uperoleia trachyderma), with the populations in the western part of the range being assigned to the new species.

== Description ==
The species grows to about 25 mm in length (SVL). The upper body is basically brown, of shades varying from brownish grey to brownish orange, often with darker markings. The belly is white, speckled grey. The fingers and toes are unwebbed. The backs of the thighs and groin are bright red.

== Distribution and habitat ==
The species' known range extends from Fitzroy Crossing in the southern Kimberley region of Western Australia, extending eastwards to just west of Daly Waters in the Northern Territory, in the western part of the Northern Deserts region of the continent. There it occupies blacksoil plains in tropical savanna country.

== Conservation ==
The species was last assessed by the IUCN in August 2020 when it was classified as Least Concern.
