= Daly Waters frog =

Conservation status
- Least Concern (IUCN 3.1)

Scientific classification
- Kingdom: Animalia
- Phylum: Chordata
- Class: Amphibia
- Order: Anura
- Family: Pelodryadidae
- Genus: Cyclorana
- Species: C. maculosa

Binomial name
- Cyclorana maculosa Tyler & Martin, 1977

Synonyms
- Cyclorana maculosus Tyler and Martin, 1977; Litoria maculosa (Tyler and Martin, 1977); Ranoidea maculosa (Tyler & Martin, 1977)

Species of amphibian

The Daly Waters frog (Cyclorana maculosa) is a species of frog in the family Pelodryadidae. It is endemic to Australia, inhabiting subtropical or tropical dry lowland grassland and intermittent freshwater marshes.
