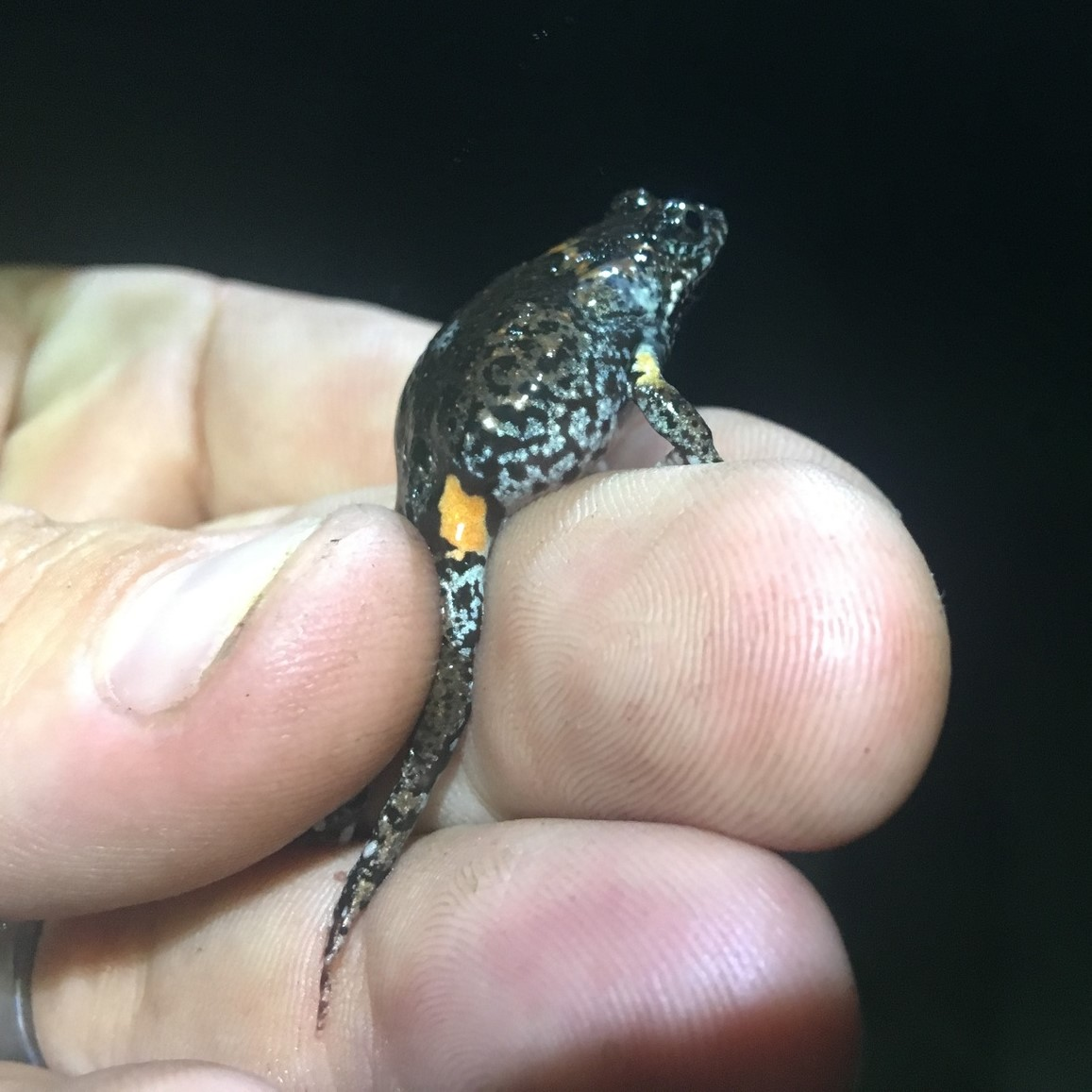

Conservation status
- Endangered (EPBC Act)

Scientific classification
- Kingdom: Animalia
- Phylum: Chordata
- Class: Amphibia
- Order: Anura
- Family: Myobatrachidae
- Genus: Uperoleia
- Species: U. mahonyi

Binomial name
- Uperoleia mahonyi Clulow, Anstis, Keogh & Catullo, 2016

= Mahony's toadlet =

Species of Australian frog

Mahony's toadlet (Uperoleia mahonyi) is a species of small frog that is endemic to Australia. The specific epithet honours Professor Michael Mahony of the University of Newcastle for contributions to the study of Australian frogs.

== Description ==
The species grows to about 35 mm in length (SVL). The upper body is brown to dark brown, which may be patched with grey, pale pink or orange-brown, and often has a triangular brown patch on the head. The tops of the arms are sometimes yellow. The belly is marbled black and bluish-white. The fingers and toes are unwebbed. The backs of the thighs and groin are bright orange.

== Behaviour ==
Breeding takes place in spring and summer. Eggs are attached singly to submerged vegetation in ponds and swamps.

== Distribution and habitat ==
The species’ known range is limited to the Central Coast region of New South Wales on the east coast of Australia. The frogs are found in coastal swamps, occasionally in dams, in heath or wallum habitats on white sand soils, and acidic paperbark swamps.

== Conservation status ==
As of March 2021, the species is classified as endangered under the Environment Protection and Biodiversity Conservation Act 1999.
