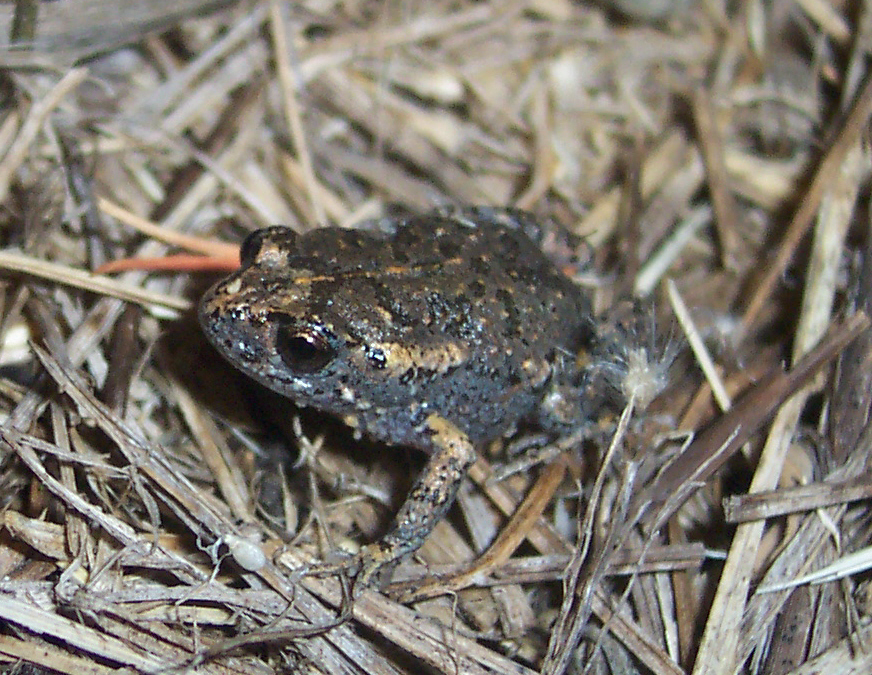

Conservation status
- Least Concern (IUCN 3.1)

Scientific classification
- Kingdom: Animalia
- Phylum: Chordata
- Class: Amphibia
- Order: Anura
- Family: Myobatrachidae
- Genus: Uperoleia
- Species: U. fusca

Binomial name
- Uperoleia fusca Davies, McDonald and Corben, 1986
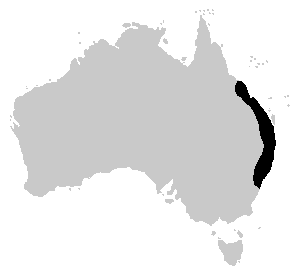
- Range of the dusky toadlet

= Dusky toadlet =

Species of amphibian

The dusky toadlet (Uperoleia fusca) is a species of Australian ground-dwelling frog that inhabits coastal areas from just north of Sydney, New South Wales to mid-northern Queensland.

== Description ==
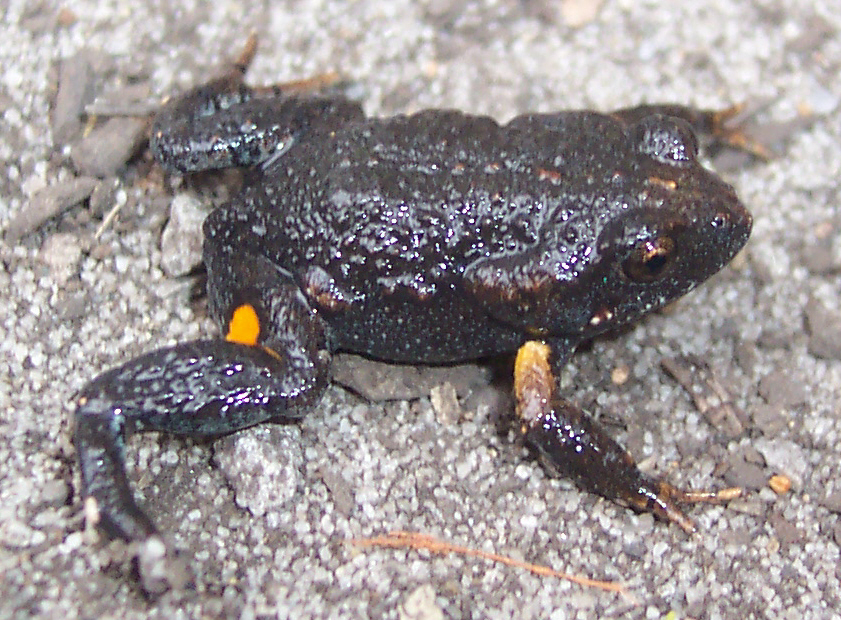
The orange leg patch of the dusky toadlet

The dusky toadlet reaches 30 mm (1.2 in) in length. It can be dark brown or grey-brown with lighter brown variegations or uniform dark brown on the dorsal surface, which is slightly rough and warty. There is normally a pale triangle shape on the head, starting from the eyes. There is a pale yellow patch in the armpit. It has moderate-sized parotoid glands. The ventral surface is white with a fair amount of dark blue/black speckling. There is an orange patch on the thighs. The flanks of this species are normally bluish in colour, giving it a dusky appearance.

This species is very similar to the smooth toadlet, (Uperoleia laevigata) and differences between the two are discussed on that page.

== Ecology and behaviour ==
This species inhabits coastal forest, bushland, heathland, and wet or dry sclerophyll forest. Frogs call during spring and summer, normally from dams, swamps, roadside ditches, or flooded grassland areas. The call of this species is similar to other Uperoleia species, as it is an "arrk" noise. Males call from the bases of grass clumps close to the water's edge.
