= Jabiru toadlet =

Conservation status
- Least Concern (IUCN 3.1)

Scientific classification
- Kingdom: Animalia
- Phylum: Chordata
- Class: Amphibia
- Order: Anura
- Family: Myobatrachidae
- Genus: Uperoleia
- Species: U. arenicola

Binomial name
- Uperoleia arenicola Tyler, Davies & Martin, 1981

Species of frog

The Jabiru toadlet (Uperoleia arenicola) is a species of frog in the family Myobatrachidae. It is endemic to Australia. Its natural habitats are subtropical or tropical dry lowland grassland and intermittent rivers.
