= Mole toadlet =

Conservation status
- Least Concern (IUCN 3.1)

Scientific classification
- Kingdom: Animalia
- Phylum: Chordata
- Class: Amphibia
- Order: Anura
- Family: Myobatrachidae
- Genus: Uperoleia
- Species: U. talpa

Binomial name
- Uperoleia talpa Tyler, Davies & Martin, 1981

Species of frog

The mole toadlet (Uperoleia talpa) is a species of frog in the family Myobatrachidae. It is endemic to Western Australia. Its natural habitats are dry savanna and subtropical or tropical dry lowland grassland.

Its closest relative is thought to be the Pilbara toadlet (Uperoleia saxatilis), described in 2011.
