= Alexandria toadlet =

Conservation status
- Data Deficient (IUCN 3.1)

Scientific classification
- Kingdom: Animalia
- Phylum: Chordata
- Class: Amphibia
- Order: Anura
- Family: Myobatrachidae
- Genus: Uperoleia
- Species: U. orientalis

Binomial name
- Uperoleia orientalis (Parker, 1940)

Species of frog

The Alexandria toadlet (Uperoleia orientalis) is a species of frog in the family Myobatrachidae, endemic to Australia, whose natural habitats are subtropical or tropical swamps.
