= Small toadlet =

Conservation status
- Least Concern (IUCN 3.1)

Scientific classification
- Kingdom: Animalia
- Phylum: Chordata
- Class: Amphibia
- Order: Anura
- Family: Myobatrachidae
- Genus: Uperoleia
- Species: U. minima

Binomial name
- Uperoleia minima Tyler, Davies & Martin, 1981

Species of frog

The small toadlet (Uperoleia minima) is a species of frog in the family Myobatrachidae. It is endemic to Australia. Its natural habitats are subtropical or tropical dry lowland grassland and subtropical or tropical seasonally wet or flooded lowland grassland in the Kimberley region of Western Australia.

== Description ==
The species grows to about 25 mm in length (SVL).

== Conservation ==
The species was last assessed by the IUCN in May 2021 when it was classified as "least concern".
