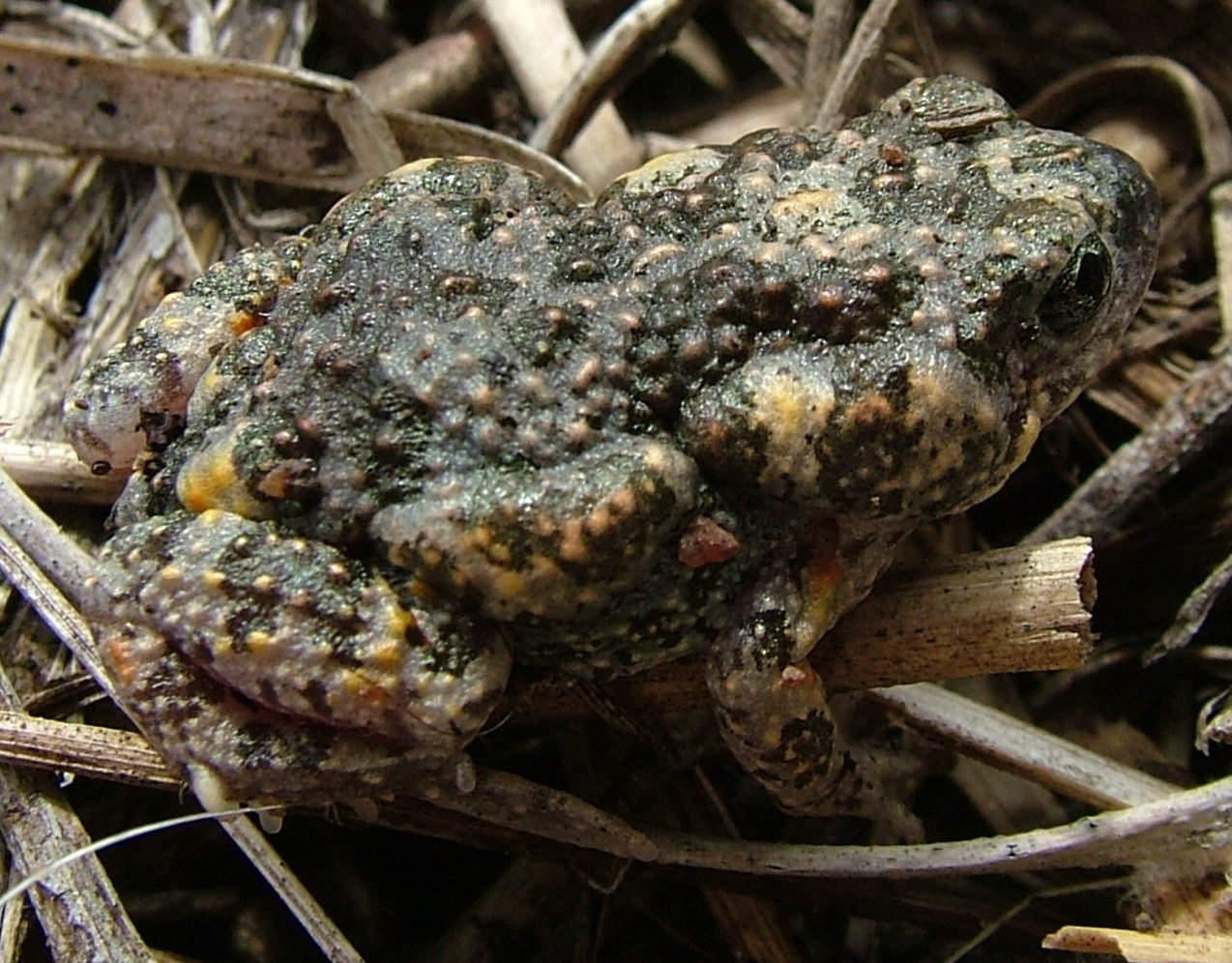

Conservation status
- Least Concern (IUCN 3.1)

Scientific classification
- Kingdom: Animalia
- Phylum: Chordata
- Class: Amphibia
- Order: Anura
- Family: Myobatrachidae
- Genus: Uperoleia
- Species: U. rugosa

Binomial name
- Uperoleia rugosa Andersson, 1916

Synonyms
- Uperoleia capitulata Davies, McDonald, & Corben, 1986

= Wrinkled toadlet =

Species of amphibian

The wrinkled toadlet (Uperoleia rugosa) is a species of small, ground-dwelling frog in the family Myobatrachidae It is endemic to Australia. It is also commonly called the small-headed toadlet, red-groined toadlet or the chubby gungan.

== Description ==
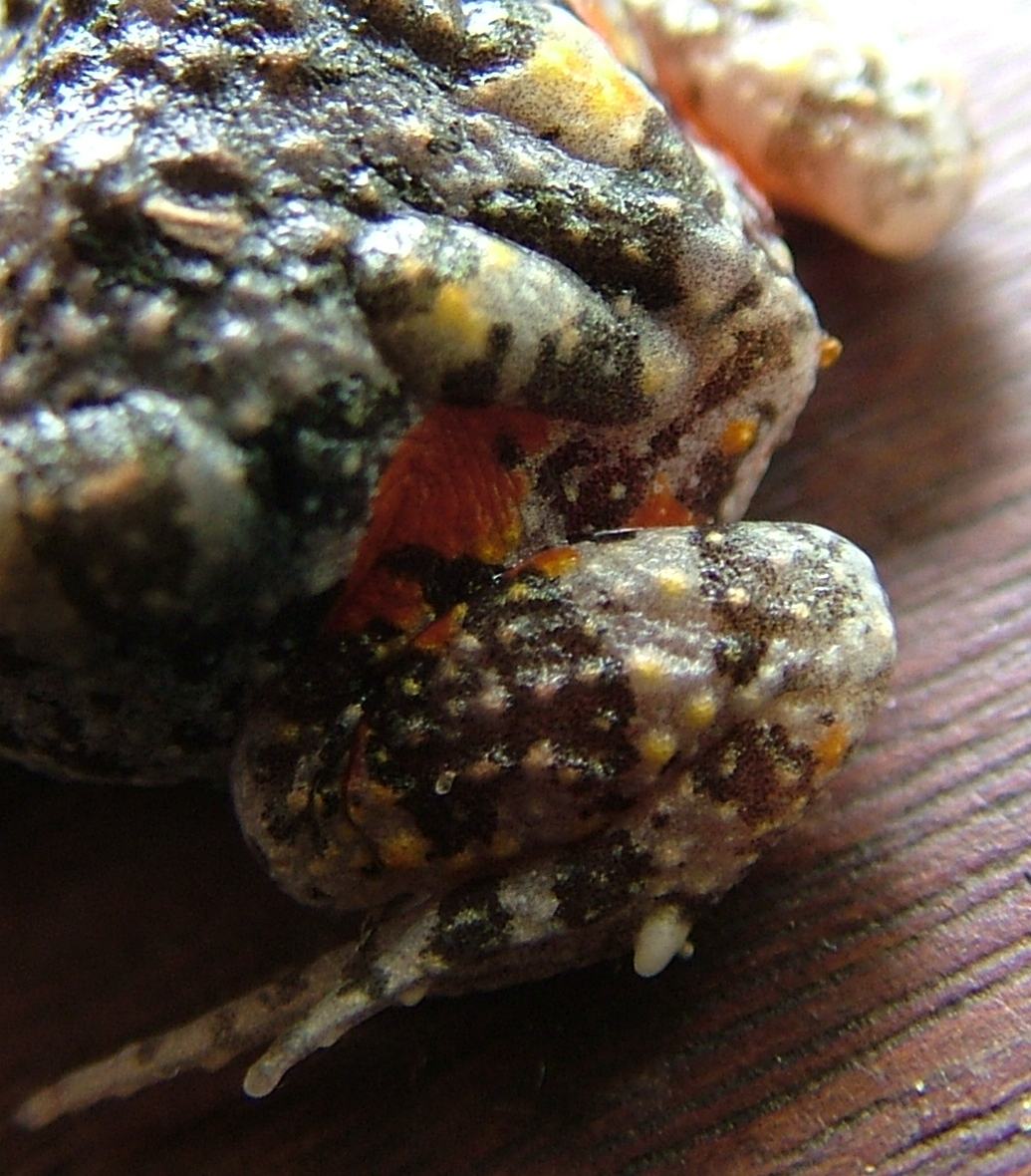
Thigh colouration of the wrinkled toadlet

The wrinkled toadlet is a small frog, which varies largely in size. It is smaller on the coast of eastern Australia, and larger inland, ranging from 1.8 to 3.2 cm (0.71 to 1.26 in). The dorsal surface is warty, and grey to brown, with dark markings. The ventral surface is smooth and grey. The parotoid glands and inguinal glands are large in comparison to the size of the frog, and yellowish in colour. Behind each knee, and in the groin are bright orange.

The tadpoles hatch mostly black, with a distinct gold patch behind each eye. As development continues, the gold pigment spreads, until the tadpole is mottled grey and gold.

The wrinkled toadlet has mostly unwebbed hands and feet, and the tympanum is not visible.

== Ecology and behavior ==
The wrinkled toadlet inhabits subtropical or tropical dry shrubland, subtropical or tropical dry lowland grassland and forests, and intermittent freshwater marshes. The males call from within flooded grasslands any time of the year, except winter. The male's call is a high pitched click. Amplexus takes place within the flooded grassland. The male fertilizes each egg individually. The female then dives under water and attaches it to a submerged object. Each egg is attached to a different object.
