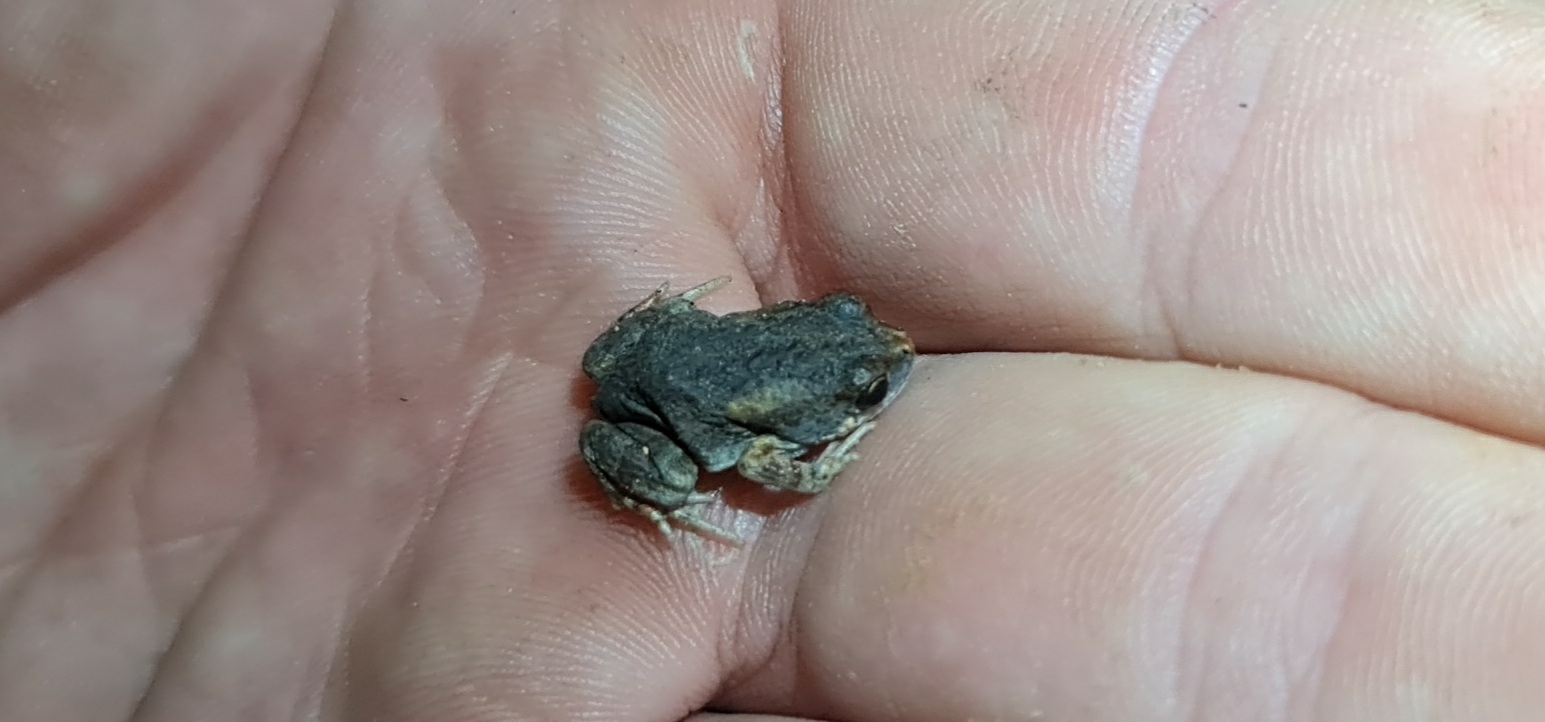

Conservation status
- Least Concern (IUCN 3.1)

Scientific classification
- Kingdom: Animalia
- Phylum: Chordata
- Class: Amphibia
- Order: Anura
- Family: Myobatrachidae
- Genus: Uperoleia
- Species: U. crassa

Binomial name
- Uperoleia crassa Tyler, Davies, & Martin, 1981

= Fat toadlet =

Species of frog

The fat toadlet (Uperoleia crassa) is a species of frog in the family Myobatrachidae. It is endemic to Australia. Its natural habitats are subtropical or tropical dry lowland grassland and intermittent freshwater marshes.
