= Martin's toadlet =

Conservation status
- Data Deficient (IUCN 3.1)

- Endangered (EPBC Act)

Scientific classification
- Kingdom: Animalia
- Phylum: Chordata
- Class: Amphibia
- Order: Anura
- Family: Myobatrachidae
- Genus: Uperoleia
- Species: U. martini

Binomial name
- Uperoleia martini Davies & Littlejohn, 1986

Species of frog

The Martin's toadlet (Uperoleia martini) is a species of frog in the family Myobatrachidae. It is endemic to south-eastern Australia.

As of November 2023, the species is classified as endangered under the Environment Protection and Biodiversity Conservation Act 1999.
