= Masked frog =

Conservation status
- Least Concern (IUCN 3.1)

Scientific classification
- Kingdom: Animalia
- Phylum: Chordata
- Class: Amphibia
- Order: Anura
- Family: Pelodryadidae
- Genus: Litoria
- Species: L. personata

Binomial name
- Litoria personata Tyler, Davies & Martin, 1978

Species of amphibian

The masked frog or masked rock frog (Litoria personata) is a species of frog in the subfamily Pelodryadinae, endemic to Australia. Its natural habitats are subtropical or tropical dry forests, subtropical or tropical dry lowland grassland, rivers, freshwater marshes, and intermittent freshwater marshes.
