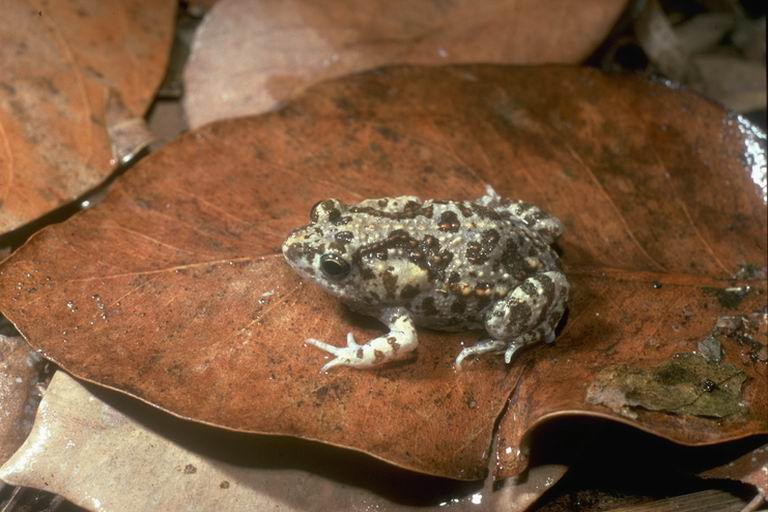

Conservation status
- Least Concern (IUCN 3.1)

Scientific classification
- Kingdom: Animalia
- Phylum: Chordata
- Class: Amphibia
- Order: Anura
- Family: Myobatrachidae
- Genus: Uperoleia
- Species: U. lithomoda

Binomial name
- Uperoleia lithomoda Tyler, Davies, & Martin, 1981

= Stonemason's toadlet =

Stonemason toadlet

Species of frog

The stonemason toadlet (Uperoleia lithomoda) is a species of frog in the family Myobatrachidae. It is found in Australia, Papua New Guinea, and possibly Indonesia. Its natural habitats are dry savanna, moist savanna, subtropical or tropical dry lowland grassland, subtropical or tropical seasonally wet or flooded lowland grassland, intermittent rivers, intermittent freshwater lakes, and intermittent freshwater marshes.
