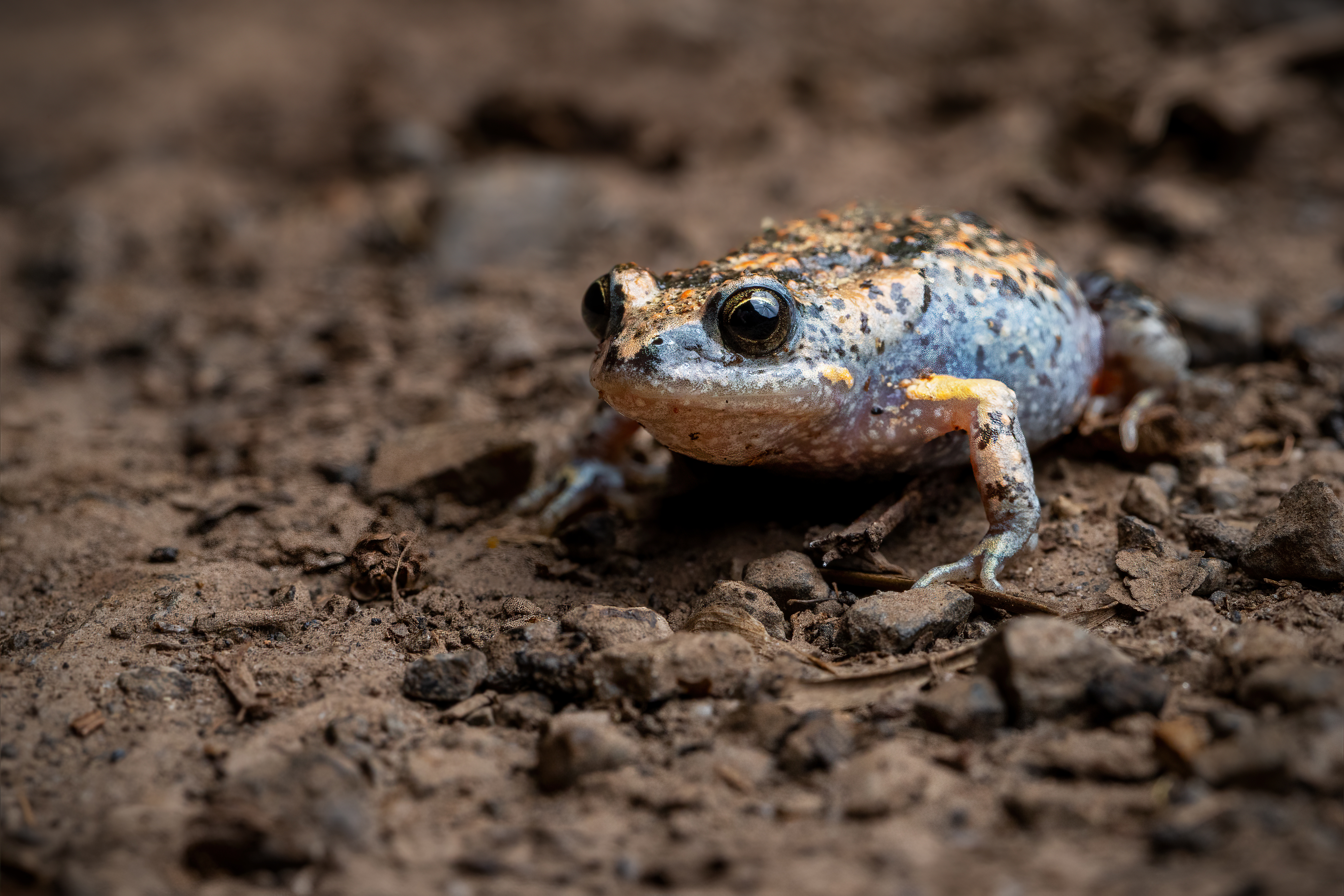

Conservation status
- Least Concern (IUCN 3.1)

Scientific classification
- Domain: Eukaryota
- Kingdom: Animalia
- Phylum: Chordata
- Class: Amphibia
- Order: Anura
- Family: Myobatrachidae
- Genus: Uperoleia
- Species: U. laevigata

Binomial name
- Uperoleia laevigata Keferstein, 1867
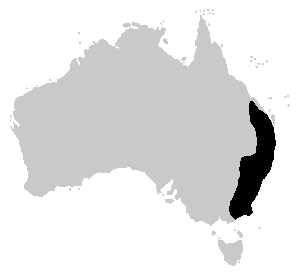
- Range of the smooth toadlet

= Smooth toadlet =

Species of amphibian

The smooth toadlet (Uperoleia laevigata) is a species of Australian ground-dwelling frog native to the coast and west of the ranges of south-east Queensland, all of eastern New South Wales and north-eastern Victoria.

== Description ==
The smooth toadlet reaches 35mm in length. It is grey-brown to olive-brown above often with darker spots and blotches. There is normally a pale triangular patch on the head in front of the eyes and a pale yellow patch in the armpit. It has prominent parotoid glands. Its belly is white and there is a red patch in the thighs.

== Ecology and behaviour ==
This frog is associated with dry forest, sclerophyll forest and cleared grassland/farmland along the coast, slopes and ranges. Males make a drawn out "arrrrk" call from around the breeding site, this can be anything from a large permanent dam to a flooded ditch or grassland. Calling males can be right at the waters edge to up to 20 metres away. Calling occurs from spring to autumn. After heavy rain many of these frogs may breed in one or two weeks, when in drier times the breeding site may appear absent of this species.

== Similar species ==
This species is very similar to two other Uperoleia species, the dusky toadlet, (Uperoleia fusca) and the Tyler's toadlet, (Uperoleia tyleri). There are however some ways to tell them apart.

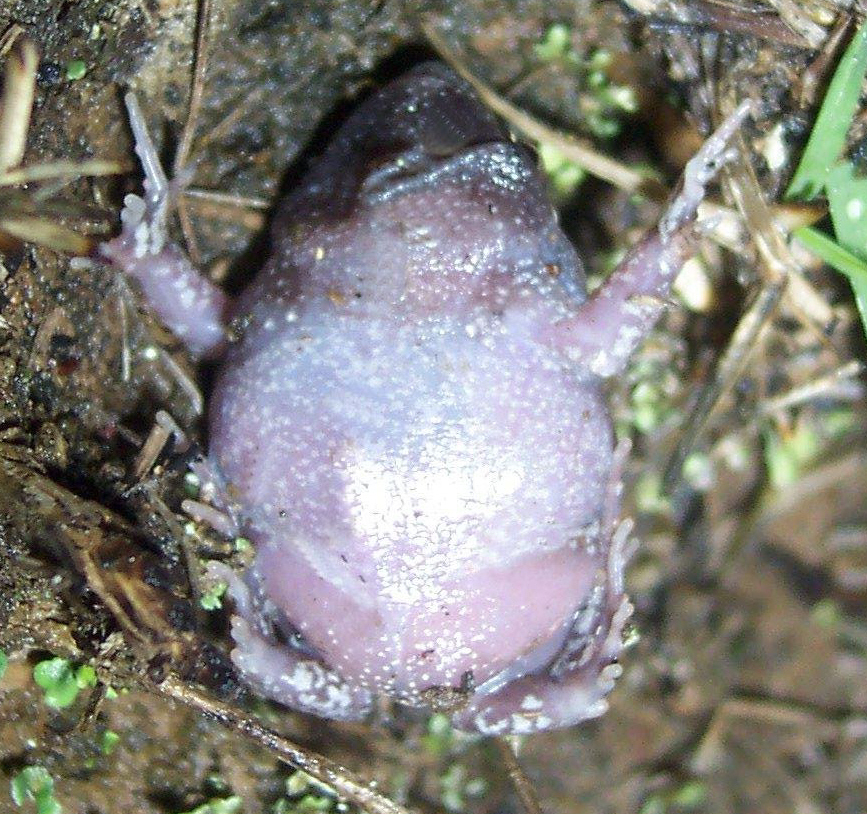
The white ventral surface of the smooth toadlet

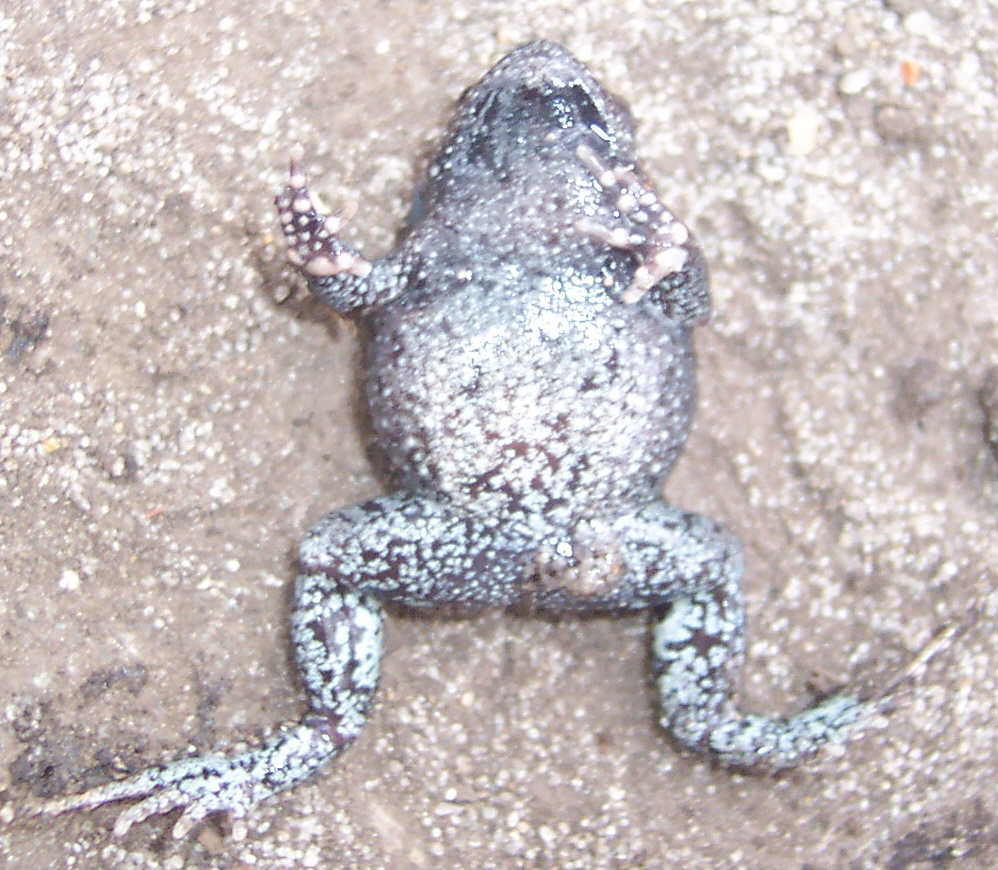
The flecked ventral surface of the dusky toadlet

The smooth toadlet has a white belly, occasionally with a few spots of black, while the dusky toadlets belly is white with many dark spots and flecks, almost covering the entire ventral surface, the Tyler's toadlet has a fully pigmented underbelly of dark blue/black colour. Male smooth toadlets may have a dark throat, however the belly will still be white.

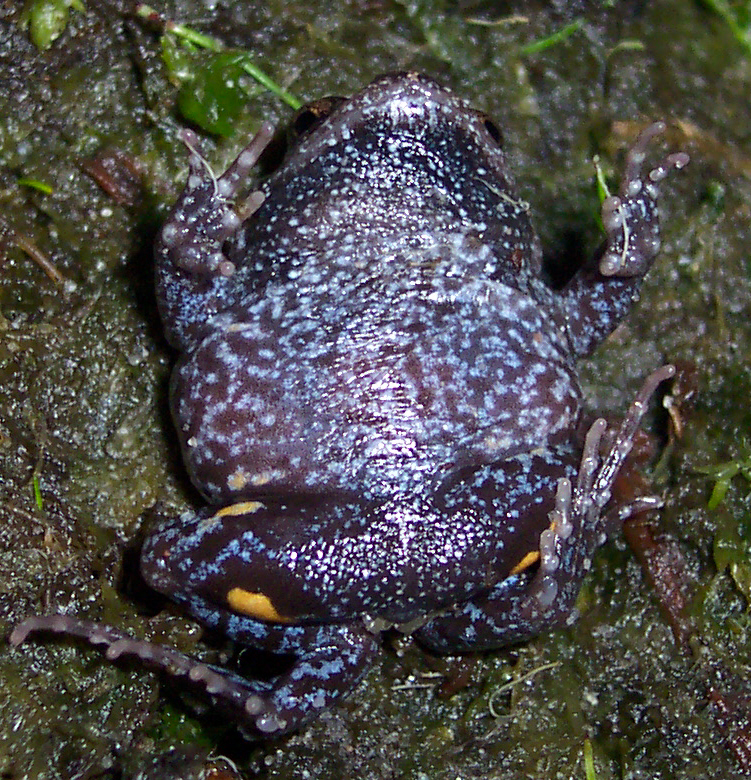
The dark ventral surface of the Tyler's toadlet

In all three of these species there is a red/orange/yellow patch in the thigh, back of legs and behind the knee. In the smooth toadlet this patch is quite large and is almost always red, it can however be orange but is not yellow. In the dusky toadlet this colour patch is more reduced and is almost always orange, but can be red and occasionally yellow. In the Tyler's toadlet this patch is rarely anything other than yellow.

Each of these species has a different but similar call the dusky toadlet has a short "arrk", the smooth toadlet has a slightly longer and deeper "arrrk", while the Tyler's toadlet has the deepest and most elongated "arrrrk".

Sydney is the collision point of the 3 species, however around Sydney there is only smooth toadlets, just north of Sydney there are dusky toadlet and just south of Sydney there are Tyler's toadlets, the smooth toadlet occurs throughout much of the Tyler's toadlet and dusky toadlet's range.
