= Derby toadlet =

Conservation status
- Least Concern (IUCN 3.1)

Scientific classification
- Kingdom: Animalia
- Phylum: Chordata
- Class: Amphibia
- Order: Anura
- Family: Myobatrachidae
- Genus: Uperoleia
- Species: U. aspera

Binomial name
- Uperoleia aspera Tyler, Davies & Martin, 1981

Species of frog

The Derby toadlet (Uperoleia aspera) is a species of frog in the family Myobatrachidae. It is endemic to the Kimberley region near Derby and Broome in Western Australia. Its natural habitats are subtropical or tropical dry lowland grassland and intermittent freshwater marshes.
