= Flood plain toadlet =

Conservation status
- Least Concern (IUCN 3.1)

Scientific classification
- Kingdom: Animalia
- Phylum: Chordata
- Class: Amphibia
- Order: Anura
- Family: Myobatrachidae
- Genus: Uperoleia
- Species: U. inundata

Binomial name
- Uperoleia inundata Tyler, Davies, & Martin, 1981

Species of frog

The floodplain toadlet (Uperoleia inundata) is a species of frog in the family Myobatrachidae.

== Habitat ==
The floodplain toadlet is endemic to northern Australia ranging from the Timor sea to the gulf of Carpentaria. The floodplain toadlet natural habitats are subtropical or tropical dry forests, subtropical or tropical dry lowland grassland, and intermittent freshwater marshes.

== Conservation status ==
The population of the species is stable and is on the least concerned list. The species faces no threats.
