= Pale frog =

Conservation status
- Least Concern (IUCN 3.1)

Scientific classification
- Kingdom: Animalia
- Phylum: Chordata
- Class: Amphibia
- Order: Anura
- Family: Pelodryadidae
- Genus: Litoria
- Species: L. pallida

Binomial name
- Litoria pallida Davies, Martin & Watson, 1983

Species of amphibian

The pale frog (Litoria pallida) is a species of frog in the subfamily Pelodryadinae, endemic to Australia. Its natural habitats are subtropical or tropical dry forests, subtropical or tropical seasonally wet or flooded lowland grassland, and intermittent freshwater marshes.
