= Masked rough-sided frog =

Masked rough-sided frog may refer to:

- Hylarana baramica, a frog in the family Ranidae found in Brunei, Indonesia (including Borneo, Java, Sumatra, and Bangka Island), Malaysia, Singapore, and the extreme south Thailand
- Hylarana laterimaculata, treated as a synonym of H. baramica by some authorities, a frog in the family Ranidae native to the Malay Peninsula (southernmost Thailand, Malaysia, Singapore), Sarawak (Malaysia), and the Natuna Besar island of Indonesia in the South China Sea
