= Lerista walkeri =

Conservation status
- Least Concern (IUCN 3.1)

Scientific classification
- Kingdom: Animalia
- Phylum: Chordata
- Class: Reptilia
- Order: Squamata
- Family: Scincidae
- Genus: Lerista
- Species: L. walkeri

Binomial name
- Lerista walkeri (Boulenger, 1891)
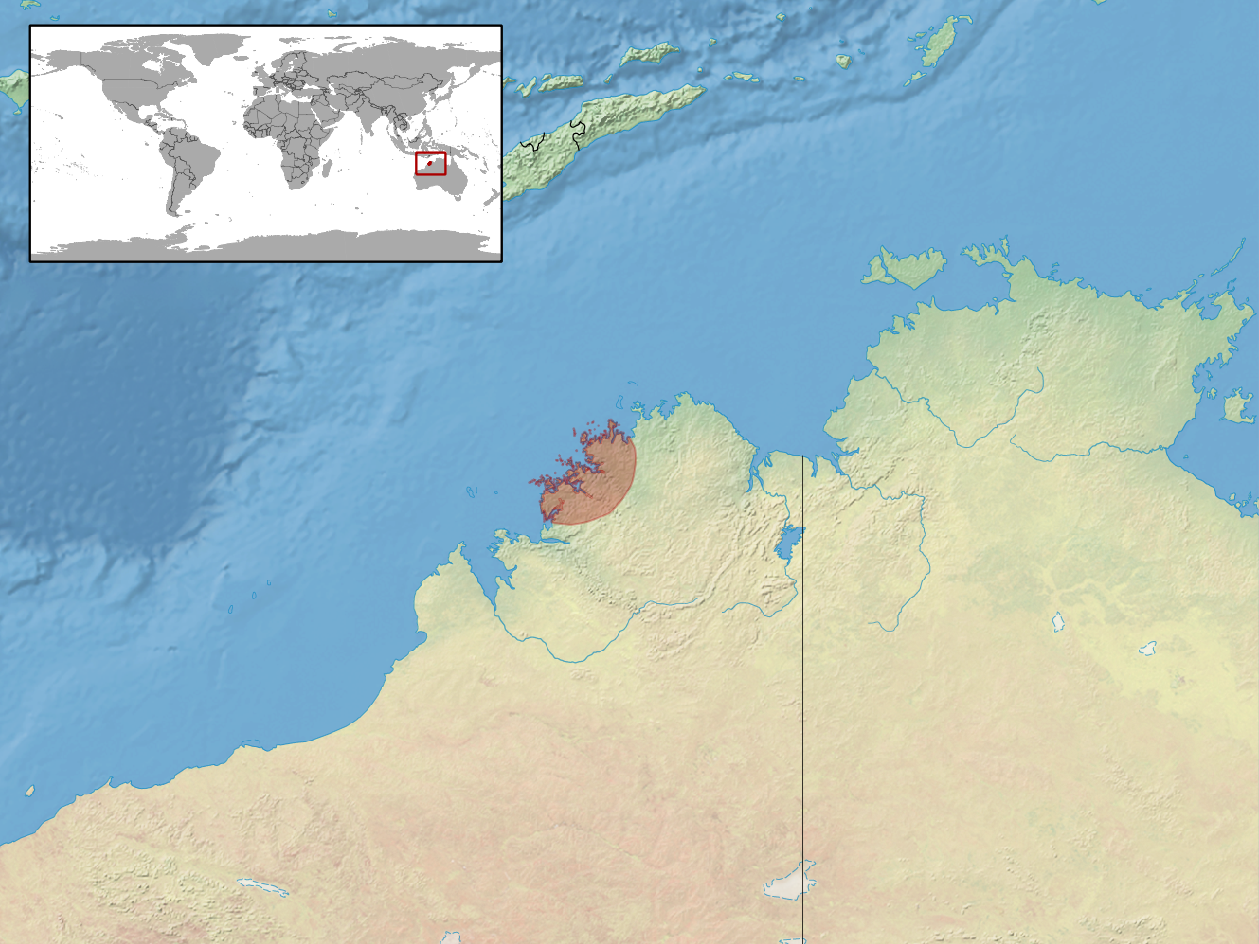

Synonyms
- Lygosoma walkeri Boulenger, 1891; Rhodona walkeri — M.A. Smith, 1937; Lerista walkeri — Greer, 1967; Marrunisauria walkeri — Wells, 2012

Species of lizard

Lerista walkeri, also known commonly as the coastal Kimberley slider and Walker's lerista, is a species of skink, a lizard in the family Scincidae. The species is endemic to Australia.

== Etymology ==
The specific name, walkeri, is in honor of British entomologist James John Walker.

== Geographic range ==
L. walkeri is found in Western Australia, Australia.

== Habitat ==
The preferred natural habitats of L. walkeri are forest, shrubland, and rocky areas.

== Description ==
L. walkeri has only two digits on each of its four feet.

== Reproduction ==
L. walkeri is oviparous.
