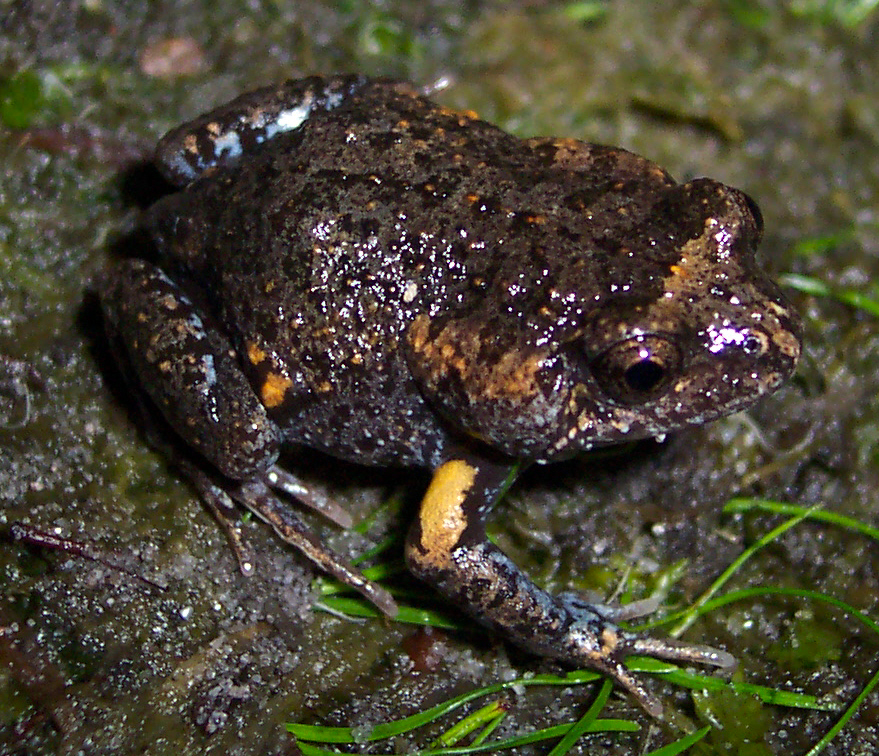
- Tyler's toadlet, Uperoleia tyleri

Scientific classification
- Domain: Eukaryota
- Kingdom: Animalia
- Phylum: Chordata
- Class: Amphibia
- Order: Anura
- Family: Myobatrachidae
- Genus: Uperoleia; Gray, 1841

Species
- See text.

Synonyms
- Hyperolia — unjustified emendation Glauertia Loveridge, 1933; Hosmeria Wells and Wellington, 1985; Prohartia Wells and Wellington, 1985

= Uperoleia =

Genus of amphibians

Uperoleia is a genus of frogs in the family Myobatrachidae. They are native to northern and eastern Australia and southern lowlands of New Guinea. These are small squat frogs, more commonly known as "toadlets". They have glandular skin, often with a pair of raised glands behind each eye, or on the flanks.

They have bumpy, rough skin giving them the appearance of a small toad, hence the name "toadlet", although they are often called "gungans" in Queensland. There are two distinct types of calls—Uperoleia species make either a "click" or a "squelch". Generally, the "clicking" Uperoleia have long thin inguinal glands that run along the dorsal surface, while the "squelching" Uperoleia have round inguinal glands restricted to the posterior half of the dorsal surface. It is unusual to find more than one species of "clickers" or "squelchers" in the same location, although finding one of each is quite frequent in northern Australia. The species in this genus show great similarities in body shape and colouration making them difficult to tell apart. Call analysis is often required to confirm identification. This genus is the largest of any in the family Myobatrachidae.

Clicking Uperoleia include U. glandulosa, U. aspera, U. minima, U. trachyderma, U. lithomoda, U. littlejohni, U. altissima, U. mimula, and U. rugosa. The squelching Uperoleia include U. russelli, U. saxatilis, U. talpa, U. borealis, U. crassa, and U. inundata. The eastern species U. laevigata, U. fusca, U. tyleri, and U. martini are also squelchers, but are distantly related. The species U. mjobergi, U. micromeles, U. micra, and U. daviesae are distinct from these other groups.

== Species ==
Following the Amphibian Species of the World, there are 29 species:

Common name	Binomial name
Montane toadlet	Uperoleia altissima Davies, Watson, McDonald, Trenerry & Werren, 1993
Jabiru toadlet	Uperoleia arenicola Tyler, Davies & Martin, 1981
Derby toadlet	Uperoleia aspera Tyler, Davies & Martin, 1981
Northern toadlet	Uperoleia borealis Tyler, Davies & Martin, 1981
Fat toadlet	Uperoleia crassa Tyler, Davies & Martin, 1981
Howard Springs toadlet	Uperoleia daviesae Young, Tyler & Kent, 2005
Dusky toadlet	Uperoleia fusca Davies, McDonald & Corben, 1986
Glandular toadlet	Uperoleia glandulosa Davies, Mahony & Roberts, 1985
Gurrumul's toadlet	Uperoleia gurrumuli Catullo & Keogh, 2021
Flood plain toadlet	Uperoleia inundata Tyler, Davies & Martin, 1981
Smooth toadlet	Uperoleia laevigata Keferstein, 1867
Stonemason's toadlet	Uperoleia lithomoda Tyler, Davies & Martin, 1981
Littlejohn's toadlet	Uperoleia littlejohni Davies, McDonald & Corben, 1986
Mahony's toadlet	Uperoleia mahonyi Clulow, Anstis, Keogh, and Catullo, 2016
Marbled toadlet, yellow-spotted toadlet	Uperoleia marmorata Gray, 1841
Martin's toadlet	Uperoleia martini Davies & Littlejohn, 1986
Tiny toadlet	Uperoleia micra Doughty and Roberts, 2008
Tanami toadlet	Uperoleia micromeles Tyler, Davies & Martin, 1981
Mimic toadlet	Uperoleia mimula Davies, McDonald & Corben, 1986
Small toadlet	Uperoleia minima Tyler, Davies & Martin, 1981
Mjoberg's toadlet	Uperoleia mjobergi (Andersson, 1913)
Alexandria toadlet	Uperoleia orientalis (Parker, 1940)
Wrinkled toadlet, red-groined toadlet	Uperoleia rugosa (Andersson, 1916)
Russell's toadlet	Uperoleia russelli (Loveridge, 1933)
Pilbara toadlet	Uperoleia saxatilis Catullo et al., 2011
Ratcheting toadlet	Uperoleia stridera Catullo, Doughty, and Keogh, 2014
Mole toadlet	Uperoleia talpa Tyler, Davies & Martin, 1981
Blacksoil toadlet	Uperoleia trachyderma Tyler, Davies & Martin, 1981
Tyler's toadlet	Uperoleia tyleri Davies & Littlejohn, 1986

Note that the AmphibiaWeb recognizes the small-headed toadlet (Uperoleia capitulata (Davies, McDonald & Corben, 1986)), a species that the Amphibian Species of the World, following Catullo and Keogh (2014), treats as a synonym of the wrinkled toadlet (Uperoleia rugosa).
