= James John Walker (entomologist) =

English entomologist

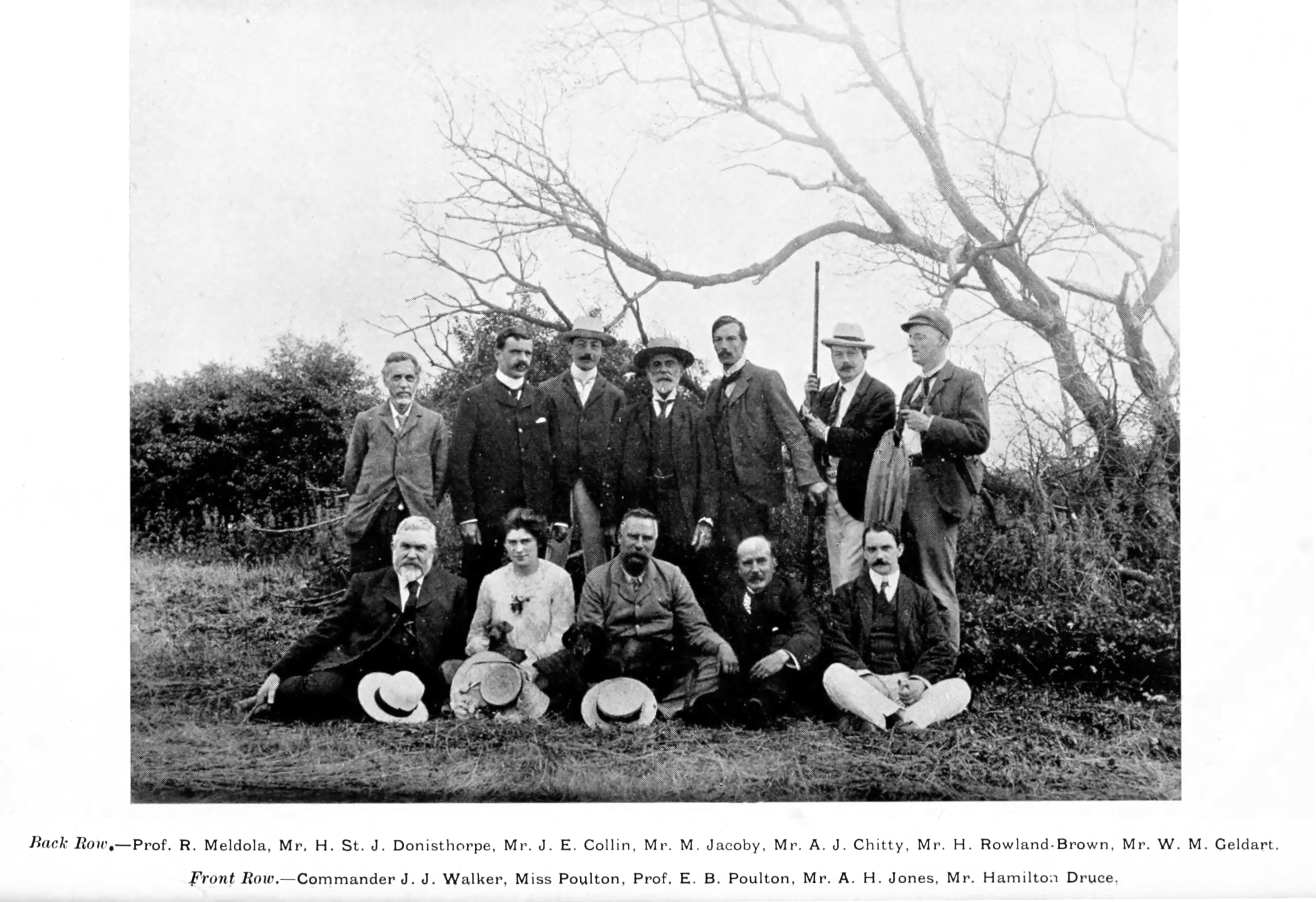
Walker with the Entomological Society in 1904 (sitting, left)

James John Walker (16 May 1851, Sheerness – 12 January 1939) was an English entomologist.

Walker was a marine engineer who trained at the Royal Navy dockyard in Sheerness and voyaged around most of the world, collecting insects when on land. His sister Adelaide married George Charles Champion (another entomologist) cementing their friendship. After his retirement, Walker lived in Oxford and became one of the editors of the Entomologist's Monthly Magazine. His house, in Summertown, a suburb of Oxford. was named Aorangi, a Māori name for Aoraki/Mount Cook, a favourite place visited on his travels.

Walker's collections from the Pacific, Australia, New Zealand and the Mediterranean are shared by the Natural History Museum, London and the Oxford University Museum which also conserves his British Coleoptera.

He was a Fellow of the Royal Entomological Society (President 1919–20) and a Fellow of the Linnean Society.

Walker is commemorated in the scientific names of two species of lizards, Draco walkeri and Lerista walkeri, both described in 1891 by George Albert Boulenger of the British Museum (Natural History). The epithet of a tiny australian bat, delivered by Walker and described as species Nyctophilus walkeri, was given by the author Oldfield Thomas to honour Walker's many collections of specimens.

== Sources ==
- Blair KG (1939). [Walker, J. J.] L'Entomologiste 72: 48.
- Carpenter GDH (1941). [Walker, J. J.] Proc. Linn. Soc. London 151 (4): 260–262.
- Grensted LW (1939). [Walker, J. J.] Rep. Ashmolean Nat. Hist. Soc. Oxfordshire 1938: 22–23.
- Hesselbart G, Oorschot H van, Wagener S (1995). Die Tagfalter der Türkei unter Berücksichtigung der angrenzenden Länder. Bocholt.
- Hobby BM (1939). [Walker, J. J.] J. Soc. British Ent 2 (1): 43–44.
- Poulton EB (1939). [Walker, J. J.] Entomologist's Monthly Magazine (3) 75 64–70. (Walker's publications on Coleoptera with some notes on other insect Orders, mainly Lepidoptera and Hemiptera are listed through to p. 79) as "A selected and classified bibliography of J.J. Walker's publications 1872–1939".
