= Mjoberg's toadlet =

Conservation status
- Least Concern (IUCN 3.1)

Scientific classification
- Kingdom: Animalia
- Phylum: Chordata
- Class: Amphibia
- Order: Anura
- Family: Myobatrachidae
- Genus: Uperoleia
- Species: U. mjobergii

Binomial name
- Uperoleia mjobergii (Andersson, 1913)

Synonyms
- Uperoleia mjobergi (Andersson, 1913)

Species of frog

Mjoberg's toadlet (Uperoleia mjobergii) is a species of frog in the family Myobatrachidae. It is endemic to Australia. Its natural habitats are subtropical or tropical dry shrubland and subtropical or tropical dry lowland grassland. It is named for Swedish zoologist Eric Mjöberg.
