= Littlejohn's toadlet =

Conservation status
- Least Concern (IUCN 3.1)

Scientific classification
- Kingdom: Animalia
- Phylum: Chordata
- Class: Amphibia
- Order: Anura
- Family: Myobatrachidae
- Genus: Uperoleia
- Species: U. littlejohni

Binomial name
- Uperoleia littlejohni Davies, McDonald, & Corben, 1986

Species of frog

The Littlejohn's toadlet (Uperoleia littlejohni) is a species of frog in the family Myobatrachidae. It is endemic to Australia. Its natural habitats are dry savanna, moist savanna, subtropical or tropical dry shrubland, subtropical or tropical dry lowland grassland, subtropical or tropical seasonally wet or flooded lowland grassland, intermittent freshwater lakes, and intermittent freshwater marshes.

The species was named in honour of Murray Littlejohn (1932–2024).
