= Michael J. Tyler =

Australian herpetologist (1937–2020)

Michael J. Tyler AO (27 March 1937 – 26 March 2020) dubbed "The Frog Man", was an Australian herpetologist and academic, noted for his research on frogs and toads, chiefly with the University of Adelaide.

== History ==
Tyler was born in Britain, and early developed an interest in herpetology. While working as a volunteer at the British Museum, he was advised to go to Australia and Papua New Guinea if he wanted to do any ground-breaking research on amphibians. Around 1958–1959 he hitch-hiked to Australia.

He joined the University of Adelaide staff as a laboratory technician in 1961, studying and researching part-time, and by 1971 had been promoted to laboratory manager, Department of Human Physiology and Pharmacology. In 1974 he qualified MSc, and in 1975 won a position as a lecturer, at the Department of Zoology. He was promoted to senior lecturer in 1979 and was appointed associate professor of zoology in 1984. In 2002 he was awarded D.Sc. and appointed visiting research fellow.

His research into amphibians both in Australia and overseas was continuous and extensive, with support from organisations as diverse as the South Australian Museum (in 1965, his first overseas travel grant), the Mark Mitchell Foundation, Rotary International, Australian Geographic magazine, Hamilton Laboratories, Australian National University, Mount Isa Mines and the World Wildlife Fund. Apart from descriptive, habitat, behaviour, identification and taxonomic work, which includes identification of new species, his research investigated novel chemicals which have found or may find, pharmaceutical and industrial uses such as fluid balance medications, sunscreens and adhesives. He investigated frog populations as an indicator of the environmental health of aquatic systems and frog mutations as an indicator of pollution. He is one of many who have worked on Australia's Cane toad (previously Bufo marinus, now Rhinella marina) pest problem.

He was prominent in research into the world-wide phenomenon of the disappearance of frogs, even entire species, notably in Australia the two species of gastric-brooding frog (Rheobatrachus vitellinus and Rheobatrachus silus), which were declared extinct shortly after their discovery). He was in the forefront of research into Australia's fossil frog record.

He was very public in the promotion of frogs as pets, as sources of potentially useful substances, and as an indicator of environmental quality, arguing that a species useful to humans will necessarily be protected. He was involved in a variety of nature documentaries, notably Nature of Australia (1988), ABC Natural History Unit in association with the BBC and WNET, broadcast within their Nature series, and David Attenborough's Life on Earth series (1979).

He was a longtime member of the board of the South Australian Museum and its chairman 1982–1992. He was president of the Royal Zoological Society of South Australia and was president of the Royal Society of South Australia 1985–1986.

== Recognition ==
- Royal Society of South Australia – Verco Medal 1980
- Field Naturalists Club of Victoria – Australian Natural History Medallion 1980
- Elected Fellow, Australian Institute of Biology 1988
- City of Adelaide Citizen of the Year, Australia Day 1993
- Order of Australia 1995 "for service to zoology, particularly through the research and conservation of Australian amphibians"
- Michael Daley Eureka Prize for Science Communication 1997
- Elected Fellow, American Association for the Advancement of Science 1998
- Riversleigh Society – Riversleigh Medal 1998 "for contributions to Australian Palaeontology"
- Ig Nobel Prize 2005 for research into frog odours

== Bibliography ==
Mike Tyler was the author or co-author of a large number of books and over 300 scientific papers, mostly on amphibians:

- Michael J. Tyler An account of collections of frogs from Central New Guinea Australian Museum, Sydney (1963)
- Michael J. Tyler The frogs of South Australia South Australian Museum, Adelaide (1966)
- Michael J. Tyler Papuan hylid frogs of the genus Hyla E. J. Brill, Leiden (1968)
- Michael J. Tyler The cane toad Bufo marinus : an historical account and modern assessment Vermin and Noxious Weeds Destruction Board, Victoria and Agriculture Protection Board, Western Australia (1975).
- Michael J. Tyler Frogs Collins' Australian naturalist library (1976)
- Michael J. Tyler Amphibians of South Australia (section, Handbook of the flora and fauna of South Australia) Government Printers, Adelaide (1978)
- Michael J. Tyler There's a frog in my throat/stomach Collins, Sydney (1984)
- Michael Tyler A natural history museum : behind the scenes Bookshelf, Gosford, N.S.W. (1992)
- Michael J. Tyler Australian frogs : a natural history Reed, Chatswood, NSW (1994)
- Michael J. Tyler The action plan for Australian frogs Australian Nature Conservation Agency, Canberra (1995)
- Michael J. Tyler Frogs as pets : a guide to keeping the Australian Green Tree Frog (Litoria caerulea) Graphic Print Group, Richmond, S.Aust (1996)
- Michael J. Tyler It's true : frogs are cannibals Allen & Unwin, Crows Nest, N.S.W. (2004)

Joint authorship etc.

- Michael J. Tyler (compiler) An annotated bibliography of the frogs of Papua New Guinea : (up to and including 1971) South Australian Museum, Adelaide (1973)
- Linda Trueb and Michael J. Tyler Systematics and evolution of the Greater Antillean hylid frogs Museum of Natural History, University of Kansas, Lawrence (1974)
- Michael J. Tyler and Marion Anstis Taxonomy and biology of frogs of the Litoria citropa complex (Anura: Hylidae) Govt. Printer, Adelaide (1975)
- C. R. Twidale, M. J. Tyler and B. P. Webb (eds.) Natural history of the Adelaide region Royal Society of South Australia, Northfield, S. Aust. (1976)
- Michael J. Tyler and Angus A. Martin Taxonomic studies of some Australian leptodactylid frogs of the genus Cyclorana Steindachner South Australian Museum, Adelaide (1977)
- M. J. Tyler, C. R. Twidale and J. K. Ling (eds.) Natural history of Kangaroo Island Royal Society of South Australia, Adelaide (1979)
- Michael J. Tyler (ed.) The status of endangered Australasian wildlife Royal Zoological Society of South Australia, Adelaide (1979)
- Michael J. Tyler, Margaret Davies and Angus A. Martin Australian frogs of the Leptodactylid genus Uperoleia Gray CSIRO, Melbourne (1981)
- Michael J. Tyler, Margaret Davies and A. A. Martin Frog fauna of the Northern Territory : new distributional records and the description of a new species Royal Society of South Australia, Adelaide (1981)
- M. J. Tyler, C. R. Twidale, J. K. Ling and J. W. Holmes Natural history of the South East Royal Society of South Australia, Adelaide (1983)
- Michael J. Tyler (ed.) The gastric brooding frog Croom Helm, London & Canberra (1983).
- C. R. Twidale, M. J. Tyler and M. Davies (eds.) Natural history of Eyre Peninsula Royal Society of South Australia, Adelaide (1985)
- Michael J. Tyler and Margaret Davies Frogs of the Northern Territory Conservation Commission of the Northern Territory, Darwin (1986).
- C. R. Twidale, M. J. Tyler, and M. Davies (eds.) Ideas and endeavours : the natural sciences in South Australia Royal Society of South Australia, Adelaide (1986)
- Michael J. Tyler; designed by Lynn Twelftree An introduction to frogs Bookshelf Publishing Australia, Gosford, N.S.W. (1987)
- M. J. Tyler & G. A. Crook Frogs of the Magela Creek system Australian Government Publishing Service, Canberra (1987)
- Michael J. Tyler The biology and systematics of frogs : contributions submitted to The University of Adelaide 1958–2002 (Thesis 2002)
- M. J. Tyler (ed.) et al, Natural history of the north east deserts Royal Society of South Australia, Adelaide, S. Aust. (1990)
- Ronald Strahan, series editor Encyclopedia of Australian animals : the National Photographic Index of Australian Wildlife / Michael J. Tyler Frogs The Australian Museum (1992)
- Michael J. Tyler; photographs by Kathie Atkinson Earthworms Bookshelf Publishing Australia, Gosford, N.S.W., (1992)
- M. J. Tyler, L. A. Smith, R. E. Johnstone Frogs of Western Australia Western Australian Museum, Perth, W. A. (1994)
- M. Davies, C. R. Twidale and M. J. Tyler (eds.) Natural history of the Flinders Ranges Royal Society of South Australia, Adelaide, S. Aust. (1996)
- M. J. Tyler, R. Short Identification of diseases contributing to the decline of frog populations in South Australia : final report to the Wildlife Conservation Fund pub. by the authors, Adelaide (1996)
- Michael J. Tyler and Frank Knight Field guide to the frogs of Australia CSIRO Publishing, Colllingwood, Vic (2009)
- Michael J. Tyler & Paul Doughty Field guide to frogs of Western Australia (2009)
- Michael J. Tyler, Steve G. Wilson and Angus Emmott Frogs of the Lake Eyre Basin : a field guide Desert Channels Queensland, Longreach, Qld. (2011)
