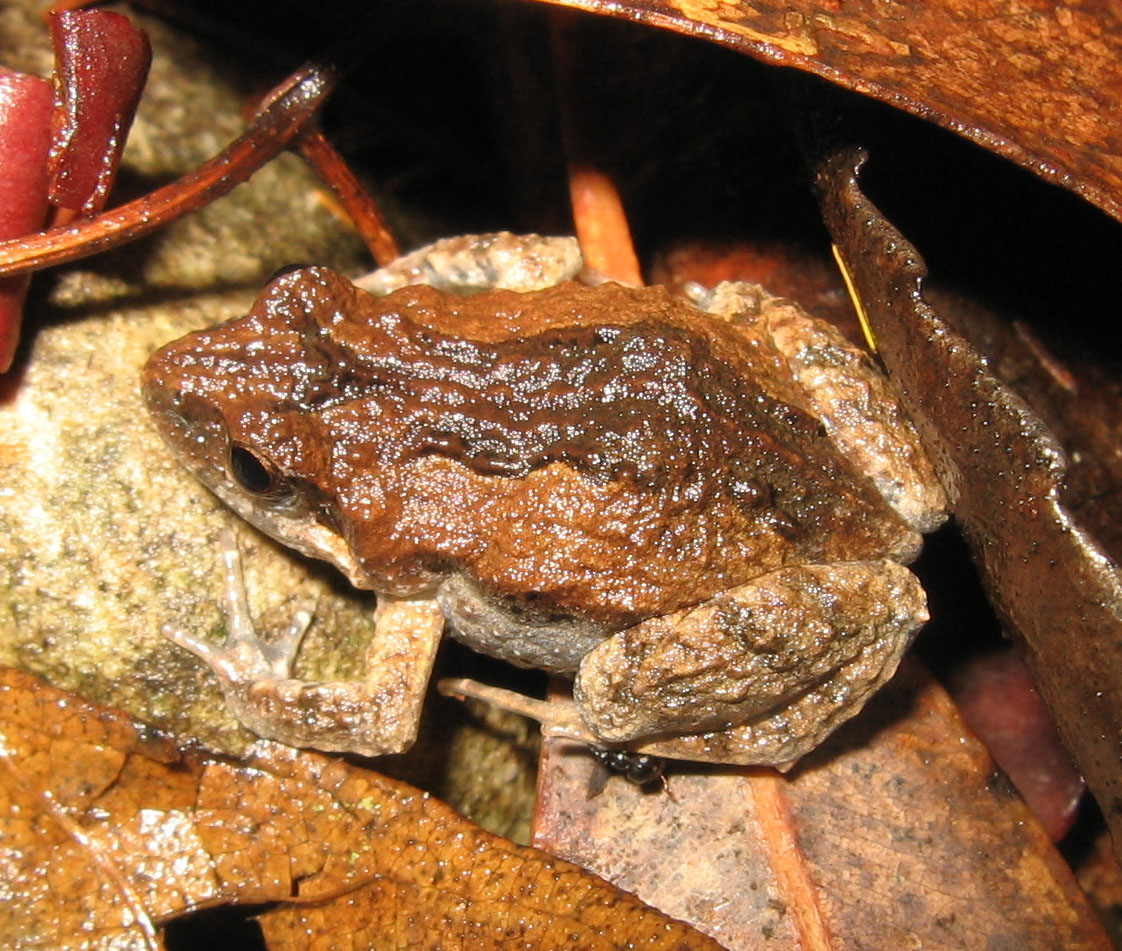
- The common eastern froglet (Crinia signifera)

Scientific classification
- Kingdom: Animalia
- Phylum: Chordata
- Class: Amphibia
- Order: Anura
- Superfamily: Myobatrachoidea
- Family: Myobatrachidae; Schlegel, 1850

Subfamilies
- See text
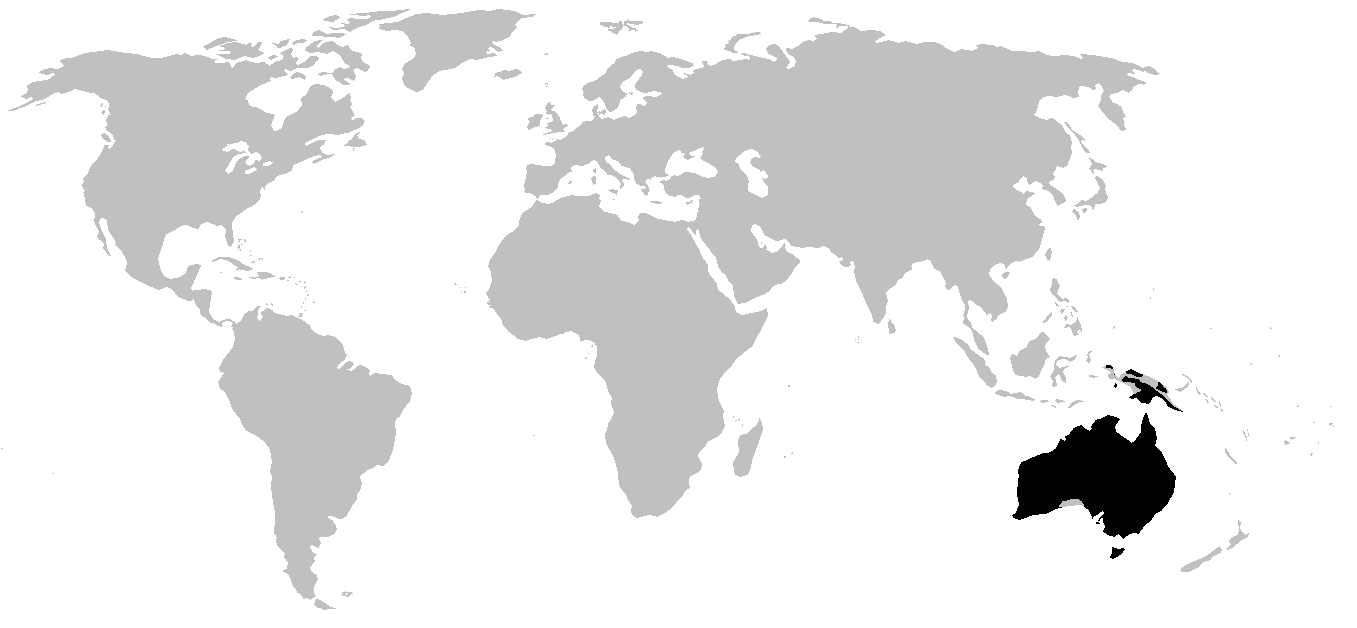
- Distribution of Myobatrachidae (in black)

Synonyms
- Rheobatrachinae Heyer & Liem, 1976

= Myobatrachidae =

Myobatrachidae Temporal range: 25–0 Ma Late Oligocene – Recent

Family of amphibians

Myobatrachidae, commonly known as Australian ground frogs or Australian water frogs, is a family of frogs found in Australia and New Guinea. Members of this family vary greatly in size, from species less than 1.5 cm (0.59 in) long, to the second-largest frog in Australia, the giant barred frog (Mixophyes iteratus), at 12 cm (4.7 in) in length. The entire family is either terrestrial or aquatic frogs, with no arboreal species.

== Characteristics ==
The family Myobatrachidae contains forms of parental care unique in the animal kingdom. The two species of gastric-brooding frog (genus: Rheobatrachus), are found in this family. The females of these species swallow their young, where they develop until metamorphosis. The pouched frog (Assa darlingtoni) has pouches on the sides of its body. The male will guard the eggs until hatching, and assist the tadpoles into its side, where they stay until metamorphosis. Another form of parental care, although not unique, is found in many species of the genus Limnodynastes, where the male buries himself near an egg mass, and protects the eggs.

While many species are adapted to burrowing, helping them survive in semiarid or seasonally arid environments, the turtle frog and sandhill frog go so far as to lay their eggs directly into moist sand several feet below the surface, rather than into water. These species lack tadpoles, with the eggs hatching directly into miniature frogs.

These frogs lack adhesive toe discs found in the tree frogs. The family is broken into subfamilies based mainly upon their egg-laying habits. Those of the subfamily Limnodynastinae lay foam nests. The female creates foam by agitating a chemical on her skin with her hands. The foam may float on top of water, or be on land. The subfamily Rheobatrachinae contains the two species of gastric-brooding frogs, and the rest are within the subfamily Myobatrachinae.

== Taxonomy ==
The following genera are recognised in the family Myobatrachidae. Some taxonomists split these genera into two subfamilies, Myobatrachinae and Rheobatrachinae, while other sources include Limnodynastinae as a subfamily of Myobatrachidae.

Species	Common name	Genus
4	Western ground froglets	Anstisia Webster and Bool, 2022
2	Australian dumpy frogs	Arenophryne Tyler, 1976
2	Pouched frogs	Assa Tyler, 1972
17	Australian froglets	Crinia Tschudi, 1838
3	Ground froglets	Geocrinia Blake, 1973
1	Nicholls' toadlet	Metacrinia Parker, 1940
9	Barred frogs	Mixophyes Günther, 1864
1	Turtle frog	Myobatrachus Schlegel In Gray, 1850
1	Haswell's frog	Paracrinia Heyer & Liem, 1976
13	Crowned toadlet	Pseudophryne Fitzinger, 1843
2	Gastric-brooding frogs	†Rheobatrachus Liem, 1973
1	Sunset frog	Spicospina Roberts et al., 1997
6	Australian torrent frogs	Taudactylus Straughan & Lee, 1966
29	Australian toadlets	Uperoleia Gray, 1841
