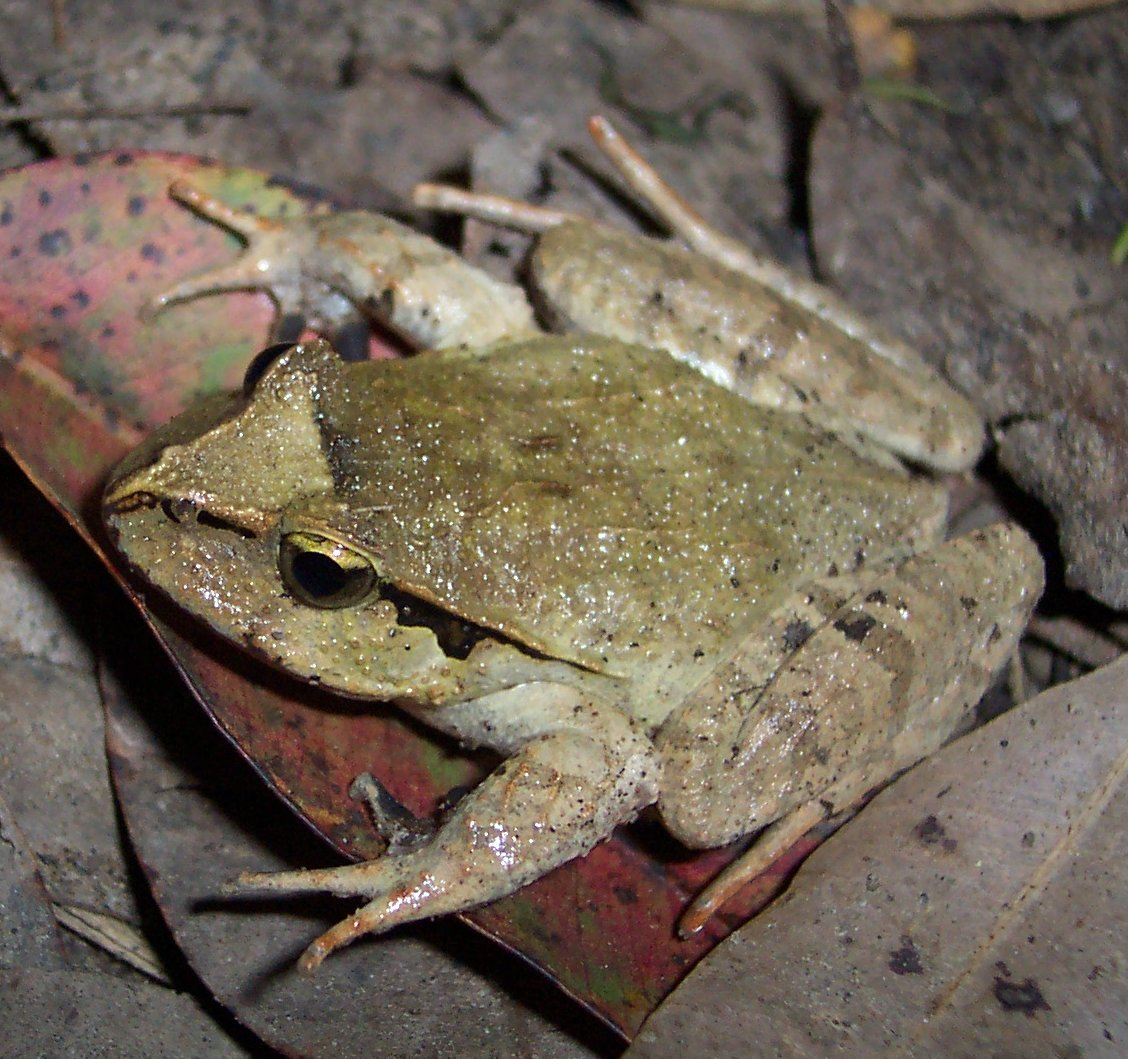

Conservation status
- Least Concern (IUCN 3.1)

Scientific classification
- Kingdom: Animalia
- Phylum: Chordata
- Class: Amphibia
- Order: Anura
- Family: Limnodynastidae
- Genus: Platyplectrum
- Species: P. fletcheri

Binomial name
- Platyplectrum fletcheri Boulenger, 1890
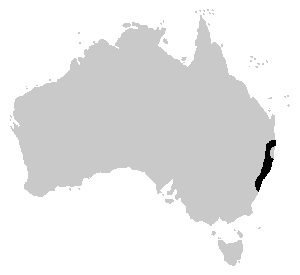
- Range of the Fletcher's frog

Synonyms
- Lechriodus fletcheri (Boulenger, 1890)

= Fletcher's frog =

Species of amphibian

Fletcher's frog (Platyplectrum fletcheri), commonly known as the sandpaper frog or black-soled frog, is a species of nocturnal, terrestrial frog native to eastern Australia. It is primarily found in wet sclerophyll forests along mountain ranges and the coast.

The Fletcher's frog's breeding behavior revolves around ephemeral water bodies created by rainfall. Male frogs compete with one another over territories that contain these pools, while female frogs choose desirable males to mate with. Female frogs produce foam and lay their eggs within the frothy mass. The nest's mucus has protective properties that enhance the survival odds of the progeny.

Because ephemeral environments are resource-poor, sandpaper frog tadpoles rely primarily on the cannibalism of conspecific eggs to satisfy their nutritional needs. The Fletcher's frog's post-metamorphic life revolves around foraging for food in leaf litter and searching for mates.

The Fletcher's frog is a semelparous species, mating and laying an abundance of eggs after a courtship opportunity that might arise once in a lifetime.

== Taxonomy ==
Fletcher's frog was classified in the former genus Lechriodus until its synonymization with Platyplectrum in 2021. Prior to its merging, Lechriodus was one of three subfamilies of Leptodactylidae present in New Guinea and Australia. Three other species in the former Lechriodus genus are Platyplectrum aganoposis, Platyplectrum melanopyga, and Platyplectrum platyceps.

== Distribution and habitat ==
Fletcher's frog resides in the temperate rainforest along the southeast coast of Australia, preferring a habitat with high rainfall and deep soil. This frog actively seeks areas with mid-slopes or plateaux. The environment provided by these geographical conditions fosters an abundance of ephemeral water bodies, a feature essential to Fletcher's frog's breeding success.

There have been several confirmed sightings of the species in the 800-mile region between Ourimbah, New South Wales, and southeastern Queensland.

== Description ==
Considered a medium-sized anuran, Fletcher's frog is approximately 4–5 centimeters in length. It has a reddish-brown to black colored back and a white colored stomach. Although its stomach is smooth in texture, the back of Fletcher's frog is granular and contains multiple ridges. The limbs have dark-colored crossbands. One shaded narrow stripe runs between the frog's eyes. There is an additional band that starts at the nostril, extends through the eye, curves around the tympanum, and ends at the shoulder. The frog's pupil is horizontal, and the iris is golden in color. Fingers and toes show traces of webbing. The hands of Fletcher's frog consist of four fingers. In both hands, the lateral side of the inner finger had nuptial pads. Unlike female frogs, male frogs have a small, raised nub on their inner finger. Moreover, male fingers are shorter and thinner compared to those of females.

There is only a small degree of sexual dimorphism within the species. Females are approximately 6% larger than males, a relatively small difference compared to other amphibians where females are up to 20% larger than males.

Some other species that resemble Fletcher's frog are Mixophyes balbus, Mixophyes fasciolatus, Mixophyes fleayi, and Mixophyes iteratus; however, Fletcher's frog is generally smaller in size. Moreover, it has horizontal pupils instead of the vertical pupils found in the Mixophyes genus.

== Diet ==
Adults consume a variety of small insects ranging from flies (e.g. Chironomidae, Psychodidae, etc.) to beetles (e.g. Scirtidae).

Feltcher's frog tadpoles are cannibalistic, actively preying on conspecific eggs by removing sections of oviduct fluid from the froth nests and consuming them whole. Tadpoles remain near the spawn for extended periods of time, feeding continuously until their entire abdomen is filled.

Due to the environmental and competitive pressures of living in temporary water bodies where vegetable food is scarce, tadpoles appear to be habitually carnivorous and cannibalistic. When raised in laboratory conditions, tadpoles fed on Spirulina algae when it was added to their environment; however, they quickly showed a preference for conspecific eggs when it was added to their container. In the wild, tadpoles have also been observed to hunt mosquito larvae, supporting the notion that non-specialised tadpole species will engage in active opportunistic predation to obtain animal-based food.

== Reproduction and lifecycle ==
The Fletcher's frog's development is very rapid. Tadpoles hatch from their eggs after 3 to 4 days, and metamorphism occurs after 20 to 30 days. The lifespan of the Fletcher's frog is estimated to be less than 2 years, which is significantly shorter than the average temperate zone anuran lifespan of 4-6 years. Recapture data suggests that nearly all breeding adults do not survival before the start of a new mating season, meaning that the breeding population is almost completely replaced every year.

== Mating ==
=== Courtship ===
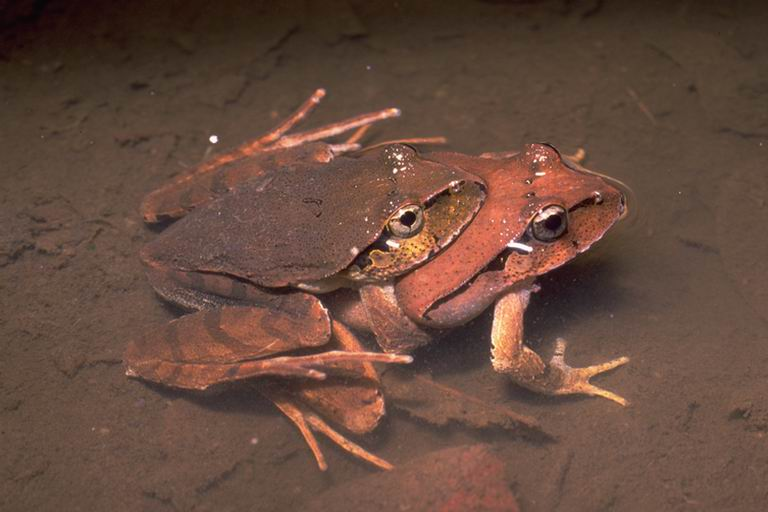
Fletcher's frogs engaged in amplexus

As a nocturnal anuran, Fletcher's frog has an extended breeding season from September to March; however, mating only occurs at night during discrete periods of heavy rainfall. This punctuated breeding pattern is a consequence of choosing a specific egg deposition site. Fletcher's frog lays its eggs exclusively in ephemeral water bodies that dry out in weeks or days; thus, the breeding duration is restricted to the onset of each rain event. Because heavy rainfall can occur multiple times throughout the mating season, explosive breeding during a short period of time is often separated by long stretches of general inactivity.

While most anurans use size as a metric for mate evaluation, Fletcher's frog engages in assorted mating behavior based on body condition. The condition of amplecting pairs is positively correlated, suggesting an assorted mating behavior where individuals find mates whose quality is comparable to their own.

Male frogs remain stationary next to the ephemeral waters and employ mating calls to attract mobile females throughout multiple rain seasons. Weight loss, reduced feeding rates, and exposure to prediction are some of the reproductive costs. Thus, as species, Fletcher's frog suffers from low inter-seasonal survival and a short lifespan. This set of conditions favors choosy females who can maximize opportunities to find a quality mate. The same pressure that produces choosy females also encourages males to pursue a terminal investment mating strategy, where a decreased probability of future reproduction opportunities hastens a greater investment in current reproduction efforts. For a species where an individual may only have the opportunity to mate once a year, a male is willing to invest excessively in mating calls – even if it is detrimental to its survival. Female selectivity and terminal reproductive signaling results in a competition where males call and reduce their condition, but benefit by attracting females. Among all the fervent signalers, superior females will select the best-conditioned males from the already depleted group, resulting in assortative mating.

=== Oviposition ===
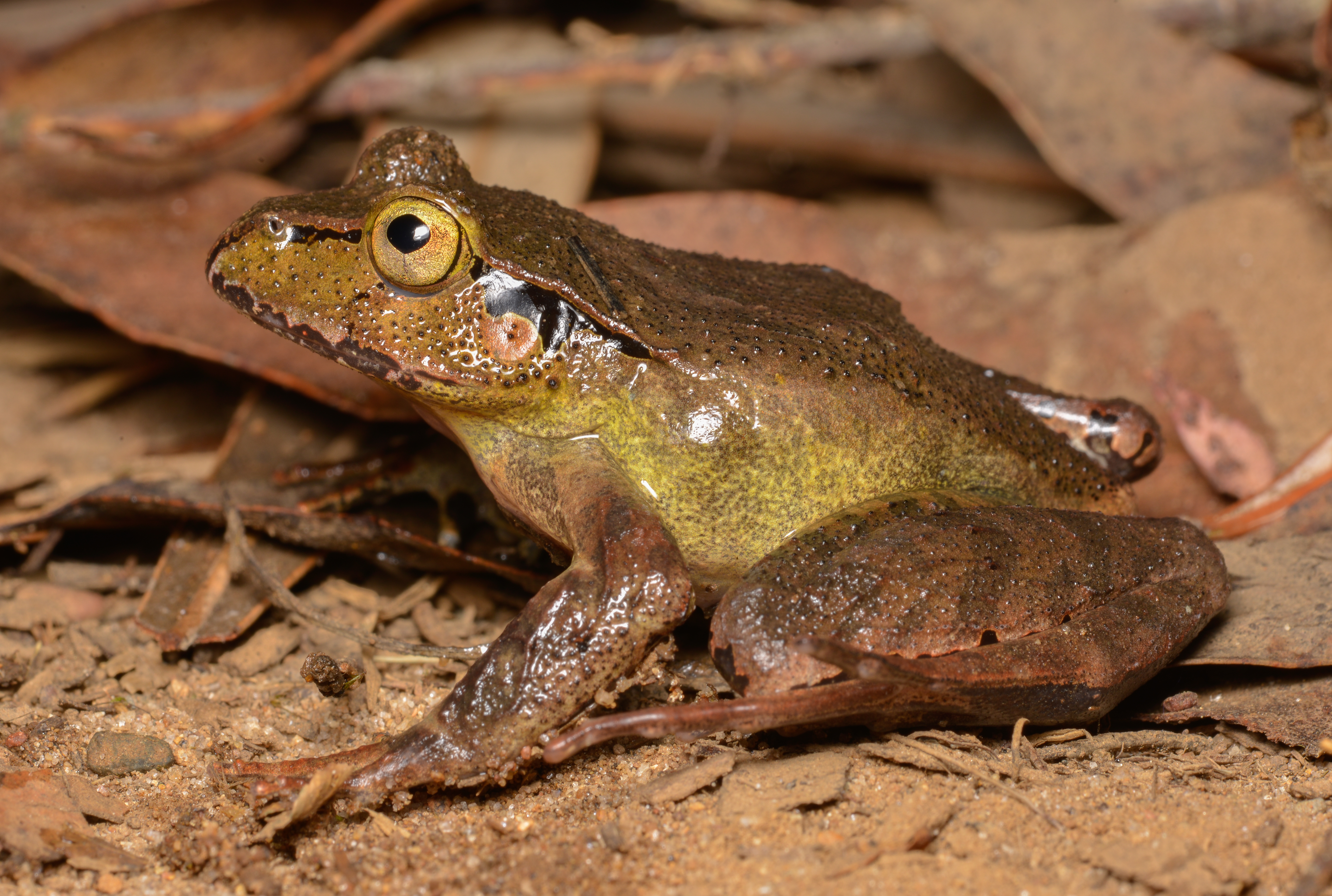
Male Fletcher's frog

Fletcher's frog exploits ephemeral pools, including water-filled tree hollows for reproduction, laying approximately 300 eggs in an organized, mucosal clutch structure within the water body. To improve oxygenation while still maintaining protection from external stressors, Fletcher's frog beats the mucus into a froth, placing air bubbles between the eggs while still maintaining the nest's integrity. The froth nesting serves as a line of defense for the eggs, shielding them from thermal extremes or predation (by foreign predators and conspecifics alike). Notably, it serves as an effective protection against desiccation. The nest's protective quality may be further enhanced when the outer mucus dries to form a hard outer cast, effectively reducing water loss by reflecting solar radiation and trapping moisture. Fletcher's frog eggs can survive and even continue developing for several days in the absence of free-standing water. Although eggs in the periphery of the nest structure dried more rapidly, the embryos in the center were preserved long enough until additional rainfall replenished the well, helping to reduce larvae death.

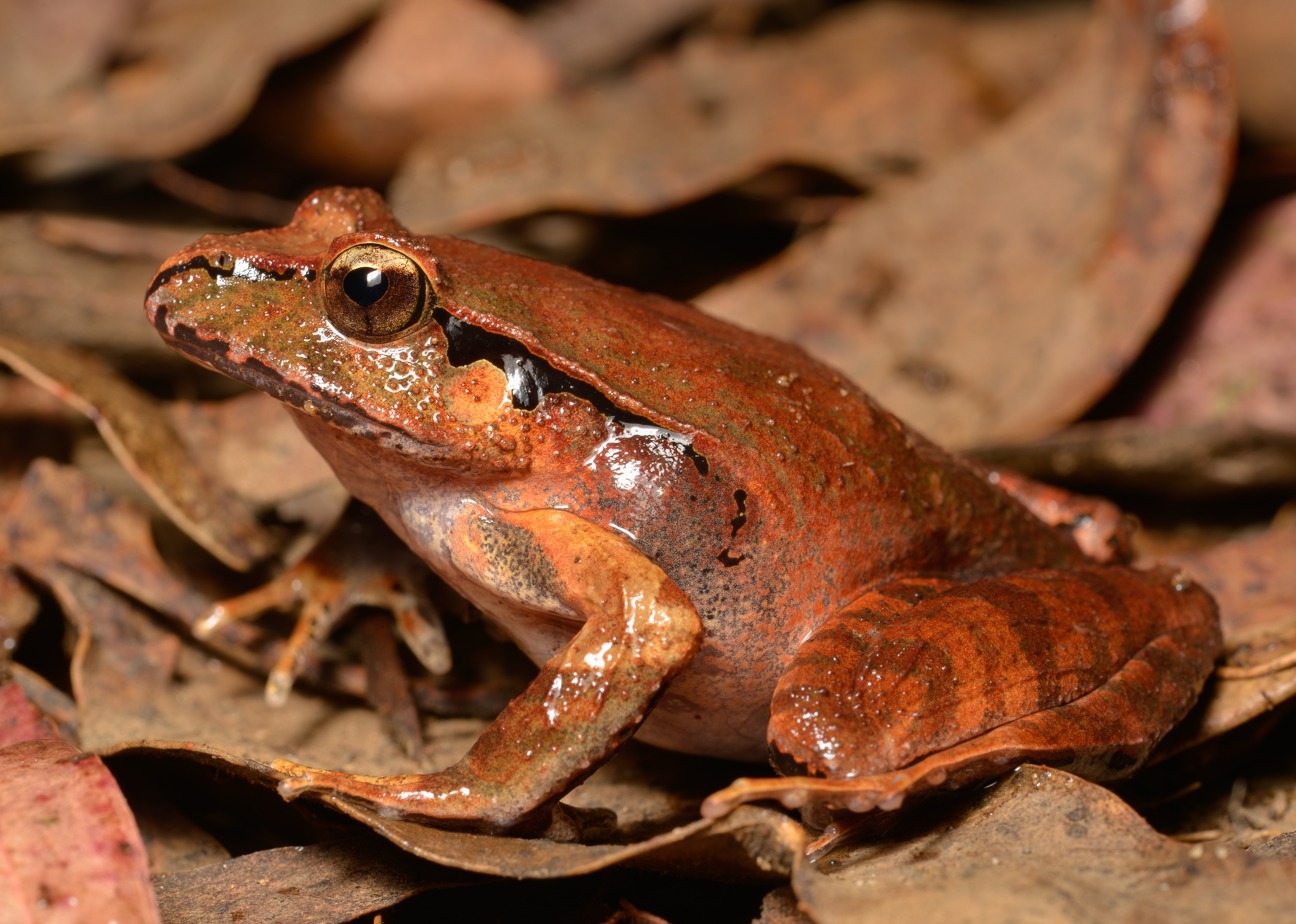
Female Fletcher's frog

Female frogs prefer to lay their eggs in pools that contain pre-existing eggs (as opposed to laying their eggs in empty pools). Adult frogs perceive the presence of pre-existing nests within an oviposition site and make an active decision to lay their eggs alongside other conspecific eggs. Female Fletcher's frogs are hypothesized to engage in this behavior because it provides their own offspring with a nutrition source that can be exploited by the cannibalism of non-siblings.

Although almost all pools contain more than one nest, their distribution within the shared water body varied. Eggs were deposited both solitarily and in communal masses, indicating the presence of two nesting behaviors. There is a significant benefit associated with commonality among anurans producing frothed nests. Laying eggs in groups reduces the surface area to volume ratio of nests, which increases the eggs' protection against environmental threats. Despite its advantages, however, communal nests may increase visibility to predators and be more susceptible to disease transmission. It is unknown why female Fletcher's frogs exhibit both solitary and communal nesting behaviors, but there may be specific circumstances where the costs associated with communality occasionally outweigh the benefits.

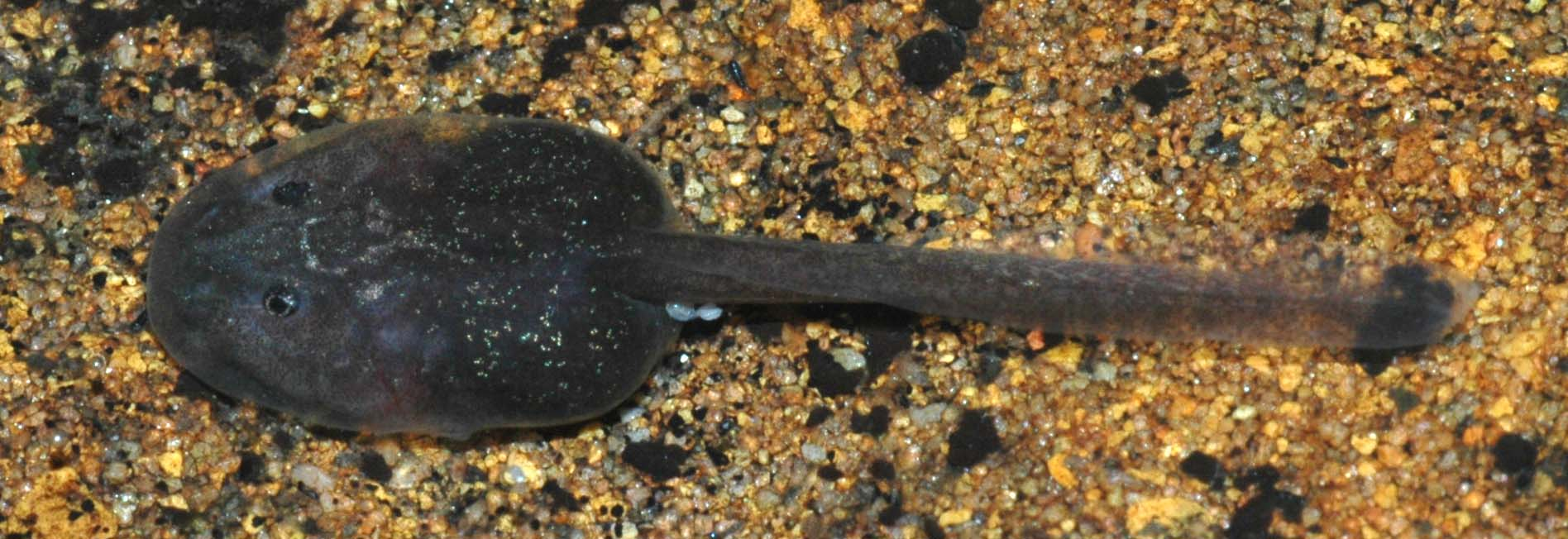
Fletcher's frog tadpole

Conspecifics at two different stages in the anuran life cycle (eggs and tadpoles) have opposing effects on a female Fletcher's frog's choice of oviposition site. Although female frogs seek water bodies with preexisting eggs, they do not prefer sites that include conspecific tadpoles. Given the limited availability to desirable nests, however, spawning frequently occurs in pools containing both conspecific eggs and tadpoles.

The mass spatial and temporal distribution of breeding events, coupled with the ephemeral oviposition sites significantly increases the odds of total clutch failure; however, this risk is offset by low competition during the larval stages and fewer predation related deaths. Thus, the Fletcher's frog, despite being an obligate ephemeral pool breeder maintains a stable, reproductively active population over time.

== Threats ==
=== Predators ===
Hydaticus parallelus, a species of predatory water beetle, is a voracious predator of Fletcher's frog larvae. Female H. parallelus show a preference to deposit eggs in habitats that contain Fletcher's frog larvae. The H. parallelus' sit-and-wait and swim-and-hunt predation techniques are extremely effective for hunting Fletcher's frog larvae in the ephemeral water pools, where vegetation is limited.

=== Disease ===
Like other anurans, Fletcher's frog is vulnerable to Batrachochytrium dendrobatidis (Bd), a fungal pathogen that infects the skin and disrupts osmoregulation. Susceptibility to Bd varies by species, but Fletcher's frog suffers from a particularly high mortality rate when infected with the disease. While some frog species (ex. Lim. peronii and Lim. tasmaniensis) perform skin sloughing to reduce infection load, this mechanism does appear to be effective for Fletcher's frog where infection intensity continues despite shedding.

== Conservation ==
Fletcher's frog is listed by the International Union for Conservation of Nature Red List of Threatened Species (IUCN Red List) as Least Concern in 2004 due to its abundance in suitable habitats; however, the IUCN Red List acknowledges that the status to be updated to reflect the current population demographic.

In 2004, the IUCN Red List claimed that the species has become more difficult to find in Queensland due to the restrictions that forest logging has placed on the species distribution.

Since the 1970s, Australian forest-dwelling anurans have experienced a significant population decline. Forest-dependent species and terrestrial breeders, like Fletcher's frog, are the most likely to be negatively affected by logging. The exploitation of wet sclerophyll forests and continued forest logging has reduced this species' natural habitat dramatically, presenting a significant threat to this species.

Climate change presents unique challenges to Fletcher's frog. Female frogs lay their eggs in ephemeral pools and streams that can only be replenished by rainfall. It is likely that the reproductive success of organisms like Fletcher's frog, which can only breed in temporary systems, is disproportionately impacted by climate change.
