= Spencer's frog =

Spencer's frog may refer to:

- Spencer's burrowing frog (Opisthodon spenceri), a frog in the family Myobatrachidae native to western and central Australia
- Spencer's river tree frog (Litoria spenceri), a frog in the family Hylidae endemic to Australia
