= Sibling rivalry (animals) =

Animals, including siblings, compete for resources such as food, territory, and potential mating partners. In animal sibling rivalry, individuals compete for parental care or limited resources, which can sometimes result in siblicide, the killing of siblings. Sibling rivalry occurs in many different forms. Siblings may compete for resources in a prenatal and/or post-birth environment. The degree of rivalry varies, ranging from a low level of violence in non-aggressive to the killing of kin in siblicide.

== Function of behavior ==
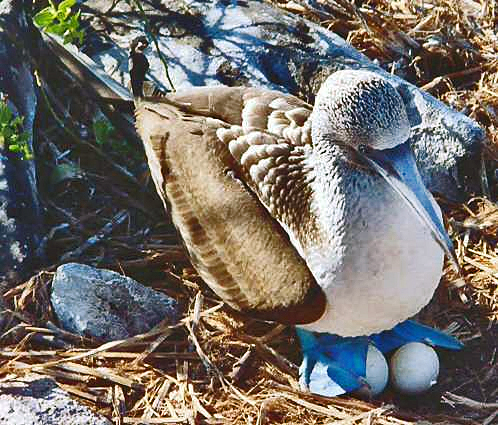
Blue-footed booby nesting with multiple eggs. If more than one egg hatches successfully, the chicks may compete with each other for food and attention from parents.

When there are multiple offspring in a single brood, the potential for sibling rivalry arises due to competition for food and parental attention. Natural selection may favor behaviors that allow an individual offspring to gain more resources, even if the behavior decreases a sibling's fitness. Competition for food and resources can be seen in many bird species. For example, blue-footed booby (Sula nebouxii) siblings often exhibit aggression towards each other, with older chicks pecking at younger chicks. This behavior increases when there are food shortages, indicating more intense competition. In other bird species, siblings compete for food through manipulation of parental behavior rather than direct aggressive acts. Increased parental attention may mean more food for the offspring, favoring the development of begging behavior in nestlings. American robin (Turdus migratorius) chicks compete for food provided by their parents through louder and more prominent cheeps or other vocalizations, with the most food given to chicks exhibiting the most intense begging behavior.

Sibling rivalry may not seem to align with the kin selection theory, which predicts that altruistic behaviors may evolve if inclusive fitness benefits (including those of relatives) from such behaviors outweigh the costs. Theoretically, helping relatives would allow individuals to spread genes related to their own. However, some species may show sibling rivalry when the fitness costs outweigh the benefits of helping relatives. Sibling relatedness can influence degree of rivalry. Canary nestlings are more selfish and competitive if other nestlings are less related. When offspring beg for more food from their parents, they also are “competing” with their future siblings by decreasing the fitness of parents, reducing their ability to invest in future offspring. This is known as interbrood rivalry, which can lead to parent–offspring conflict.

== Siblicide ==
Siblicide is a consequence of sibling rivalry, and its occurrence may be due to a variety of factors, such as food shortages and limited parental care. Killing a sibling could be advantageous for an animal because it monopolizes more resources through the elimination of a competitor. Moreover, there are different types of siblicide. For example, obligate siblicide is the unconditional killing of a sibling. In species of birds that exhibit this behavior, the larger chick commits the act of siblicide. On the other hand, facultative siblicide refers to situations in which the death of a sibling does not always occur, but is usually motivated by environmental factors such as limited resources. Facultative siblicide is exhibited by the previously discussed case of the blue-footed booby (Sula nebouxii). In this species, senior chicks may sometimes eliminate siblings when there are food shortages. During these shortages, chicks exhibit higher levels of pecking, but this aggression decreases when food levels are brought back to sufficient levels. In some species, parents have evolved behaviors to take advantage of siblicide to increase their own fitness. For example, the laughing gull exhibits asynchronous hatching patterns in order to cut parental losses. In this species, birds that lay their eggs at different times produce, on average, a larger number of fledglings per nest in comparison to birds with synchronous hatches. Staggered hatching creates chicks in different stages of growth. Older, and thus larger, chicks kill their younger siblings, reducing brood size and allowing the parent to concentrate efforts when food is scarce. Once the brood is reduced, sibling rivalry decreases because there are fewer competitors, benefitting the surviving offspring. This also benefits the parents by minimizing unproductive parental investment in offspring that are unlikely to be successful. This is especially advantageous during food shortages when parents are unable to adequately feed all offspring.

=== Spotted hyena sibling aggression ===
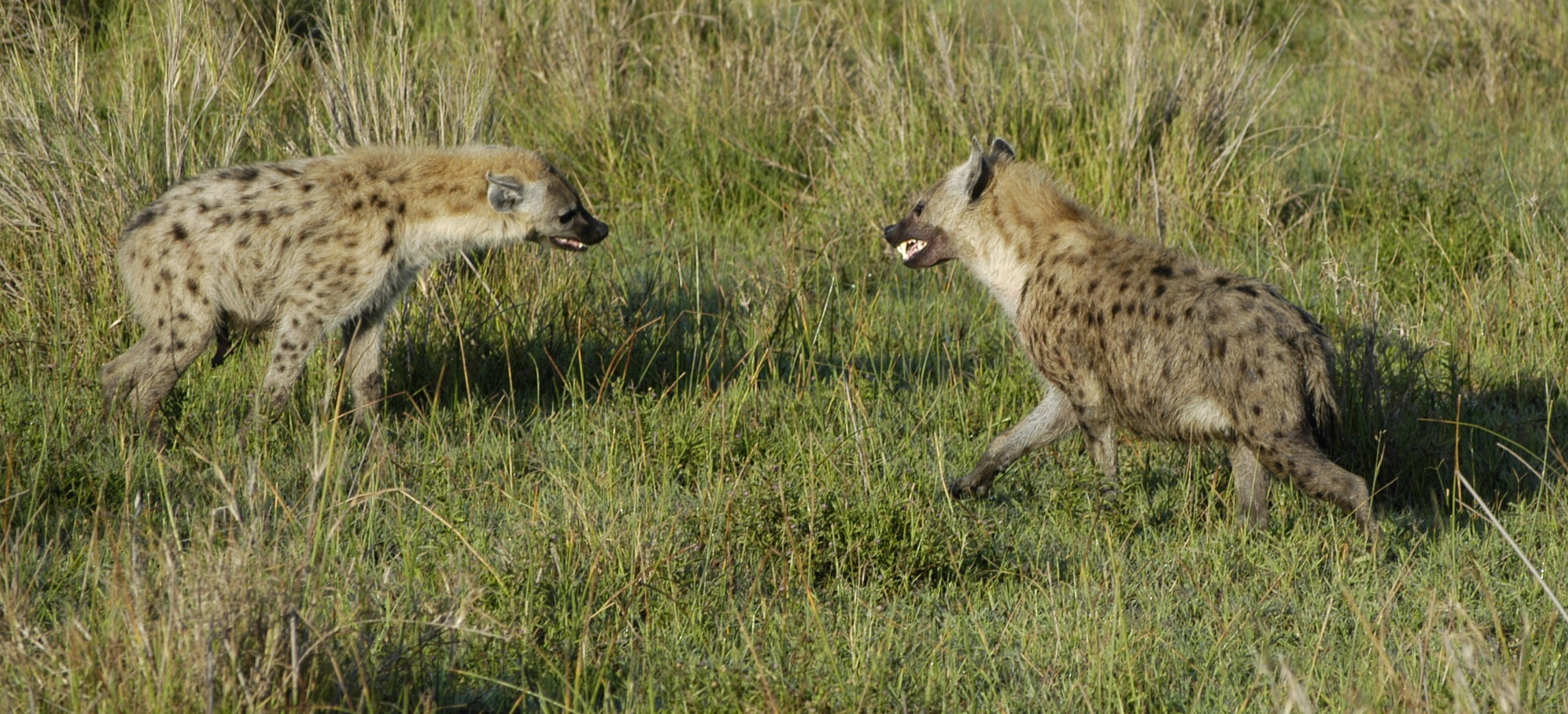
Spotted hyenas interacting aggressively. Siblicide in this species is facultative, and it is triggered when competition increases due to limited resources.

Siblicide has also been noted in mammalian species. For instance, spotted hyenas (Crocuta crocuta) have been known to exhibit facultative siblicidal behavior. Intense sibling aggression begins only a few minutes after birth and then continues for a few days. The function of sibling aggression is to establish and maintain rank relationships between litter mates, but this aggression does not always lead to sibling death. However, during periods of intense feeding competition, aggression can escalate to siblicide. Spotted hyena aggression demonstrates how facultative siblicide can be triggered by environmental factors.

=== Intrauterine cannibalism ===
Intrauterine cannibalism (see also: cannibalism) occurs when siblings eat each other in the embryonic phase. This can take the form of embryophagy when siblings eat embryos, and oophagy, when siblings eat eggs. Intrauterine cannibalism can benefit embryos by providing increased nutrition. Fire salamander (Salamandra salamandra) populations exhibiting intrauterine cannibalism have embryos that develop more quickly into larvae due to nutritional supplementation from feeding on siblings. Lamnoid shark embryos have adaptations to facilitate intrauterine cannibalism in the form of precocious teeth, which they use to feed on intrauterine eggs and siblings after their yolk supply is used up. In sand tiger sharks (Carcharias taurus), the first embryo to reach a certain size, referred to as "the hatchling," will always consume the smaller, less-developed siblings in the womb. Because the first embryo may have a different father from the eaten embryos, this form of siblicide early during development may be indirectly involved in male competition. This phenomenon of embryonic cannibalism may play a role in sexual selection, as males compete post-fertilization for paternity. Thus, intrauterine cannibalism in sharks may reflect not only sibling rivalry, but also male competition for successful mating with females, which is an example of sexual selection.

== Non-lethal competition ==
Not all forms of sibling rivalry in animals involve direct aggression or death of a sibling. This is not an extremely aggressive form of rivalry; however, it still results in reduced sibling fitness.

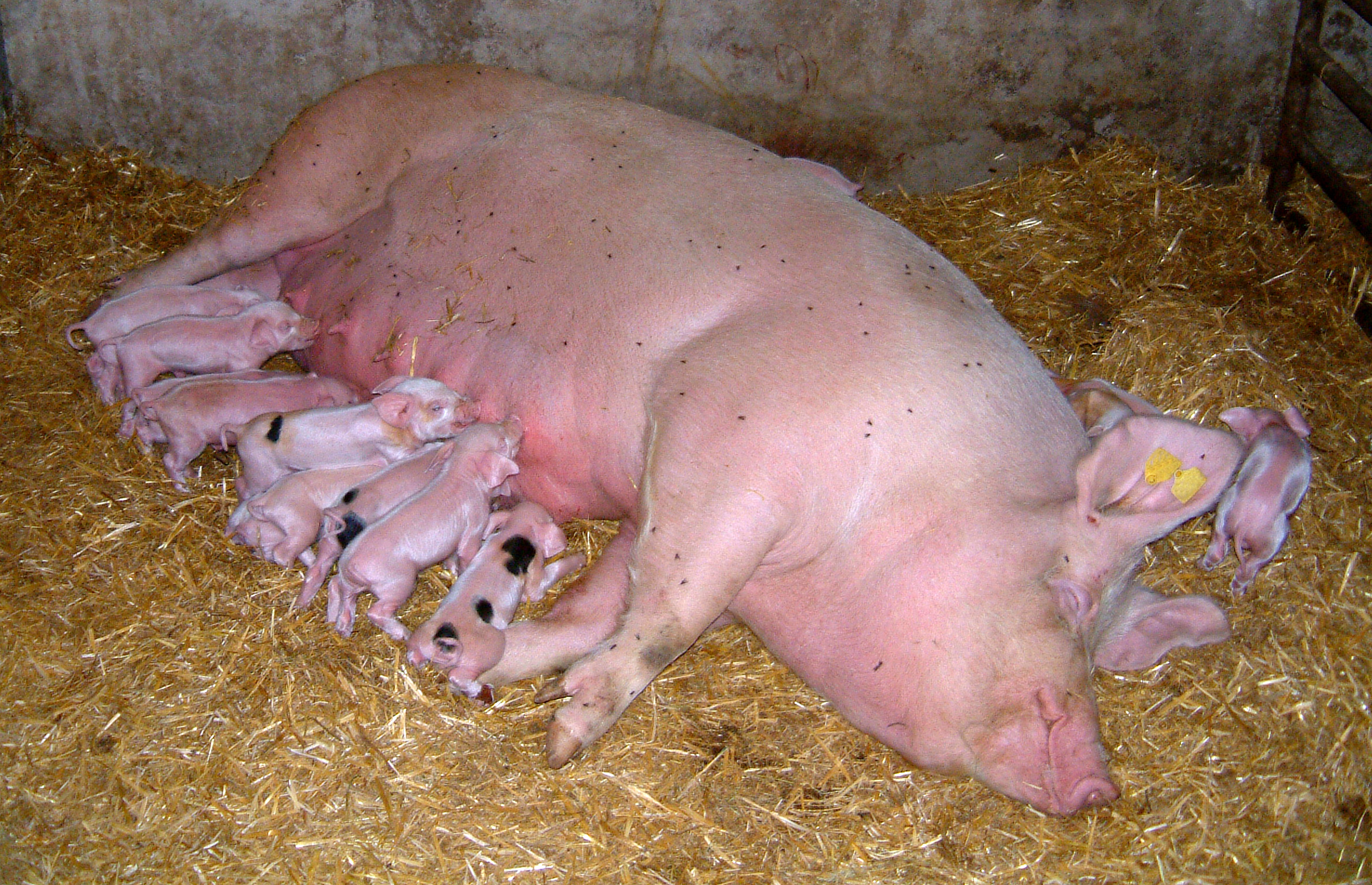
Suckling piglets often exhibit strong competition for access to their mother's teats through armed sibling rivalry.

=== Fetal programming in sheep ===
Fetal programming (see also: Barker's Hypothesis) refers to the persisting effects in adult life caused by the fetal environment. In sheep, competition for resources within the uterus may lead to impaired reproductive abilities and different body composition. Sheep that were born 600 grams lighter than their twins have an impaired reproductive ability - the lighter the sheep weighed in comparison to their twin, the more impaired. Although the sheep are not competing physically like in intrauterine cannibalism, the disparity in birth weight suggests an overall fitness difference.

A piglet's most precious possession

Is the teat that he fattens his flesh on.
He fights for his teat with tenacity
Against any sibling's audacity.
The piglet, to arm for this mission,
Is born with a warlike dentition
Of eight tiny tusks, sharp as sabres,
Which help in impressing the neighbors;
But to render these weapons less harrowing,
Most farmers remove them at farrowing.
We studied pig sisters and brothers
When some had their teeth, but not others.
We found that when siblings aren't many,
The weapons help little if any,
But when there are many per litter,
The teeth help their owners grow fitter.
But how did selection begin
To make weapons to use against kin?

(Abstract from the paper “Armed Sibling Rivalry
among Suckling Piglets” by Fraser and Thompson)

=== Sibling rivalry among suckling piglets ===
Domestic piglets (Sus scrofa) have been shown to exhibit different forms of non-lethal competition such as uterine competition. The relative development of the embryo in the uterus can affect their chance of survival. Pig embryos follow different developmental paths because during estrus, sows will ovulate the majority of their follicles during a short period of time and then a few during a longer period of time. This pattern causes a difference in development, so the less developed embryos are less likely to survive. Competition also exists over space in the uterus of the sow. The central portion of the uterus is the most crowded and the site of the greatest competition. This competition prevents some embryos from fully growing, often resulting in a low birthweight that may put piglets at a disadvantage once out of the womb. Neonatal competition also exists among piglets as they directly compete against their siblings for their mother's teats only hours after their birth. Competition is responsible for 43% of piglet neonatal death due to starvation. Under normal conditions (i.e. stable environment, average litter size), larger piglets appear to have an advantage in survival partially due to their ability to win more fights against smaller piglets over access to teats. It is believed that teeth in piglets evolved as a product of an evolutionary arms race caused by sibling competition, resulting in armed sibling rivalry. Teeth become more important when the litter size is larger than normal, causing increased competition. In these situations, the teeth can help the individual piglet compete against siblings.

== Role of the parent and interbrood conflict ==
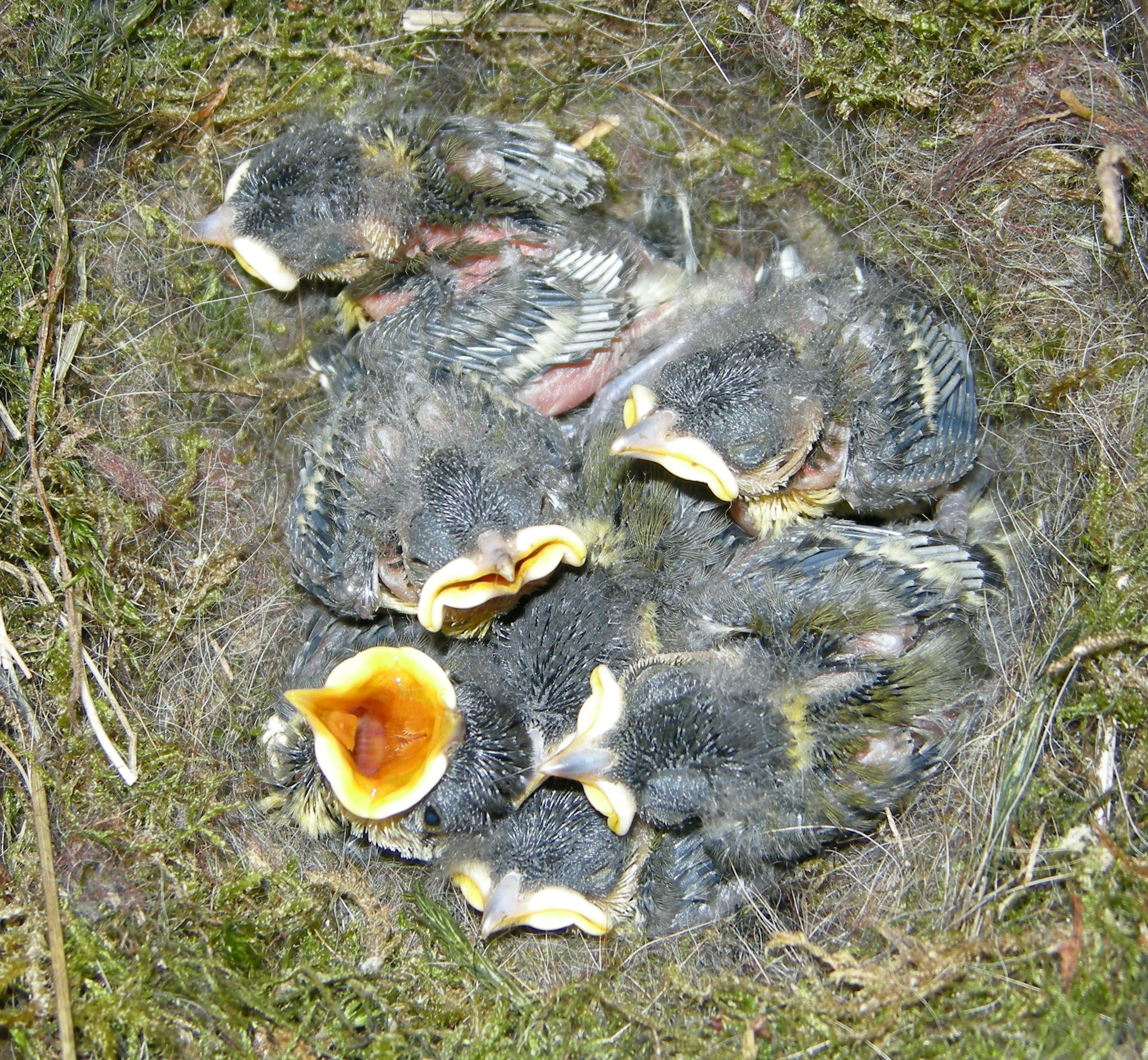
Great tit chicks beg for food from their parents, but their proximity to parents often determines amount of feeding. As a result, chicks compete for optimal feeding location within the nest.

Sibling rivalry can be mediated and/or encouraged by parents, especially in bird species. Sibling rivalry can also have a negative impact on the parent and the fitness of future offspring due to interbrood conflict which may lead to parent–offspring conflict. This conflict may force parents to exert extra energy at the expense of future broods.

Parents may play a passive role in encouraging sibling rivalry. The most common case is in food distribution. When parent birds distribute food, they do not favor any individual offspring. Great tits (Parus major) preferentially distribute food from similar locations, so offspring compete for those prime spots closest to the feeding site where they will get more food, leading to unequal growth of offspring. This behavior exemplified in the young can be interpreted as an optimal foraging strategy driven by scramble competition.

Alternatively, parents may take an active role in mediating the intensity of rivalry between siblings. Again, great tit parents can choose what location to distribute food to as a means of controlling competition between nestlings. When parents feed chicks at one or two feeding locations in the nest, the distance between the male and female parents influences the level of competition between nestlings. In other words, parents may decrease sibling competition by varying the locations within the nest that receive food.

Interbrood conflict occurs when the current brood demands more at the expense of future broods. This sibling rivalry can lead to parent–offspring conflict, in which there are different optimal levels of parental investments whether viewed from the parental or offspring perspective. Biological signalling theory suggests that young can communicate with parents to maximize the amount of food they can get. Therefore, young that need or want more food may solicit or beg at higher levels. Parents can respond to this by providing more food, but this is based on the assumption of honest begging, in which chicks beg only when they actually need more food. However, if all the young start soliciting at higher levels, this incurs a cost on the parents because they will need to expend more energy searching for food. The increased travel to and from the nest may attract predators as well. These factors reduce the energy and resources parents have for future offspring. This is an example of where nestling intrabrood competition can influence the parents' investment in future broods.

== Effects on life history ==
In mammal species that have high rates of sibling rivalry, growth rates after birth tend to be low relative to size at birth. This can potentially be explained by the fact that energy expenditure becomes higher with increased scramble competition for the mother's milk.

== See also ==
- Behavioral ecology § Sibling-sibling conflict
