= Cannibalism =

Eating members of one's own species

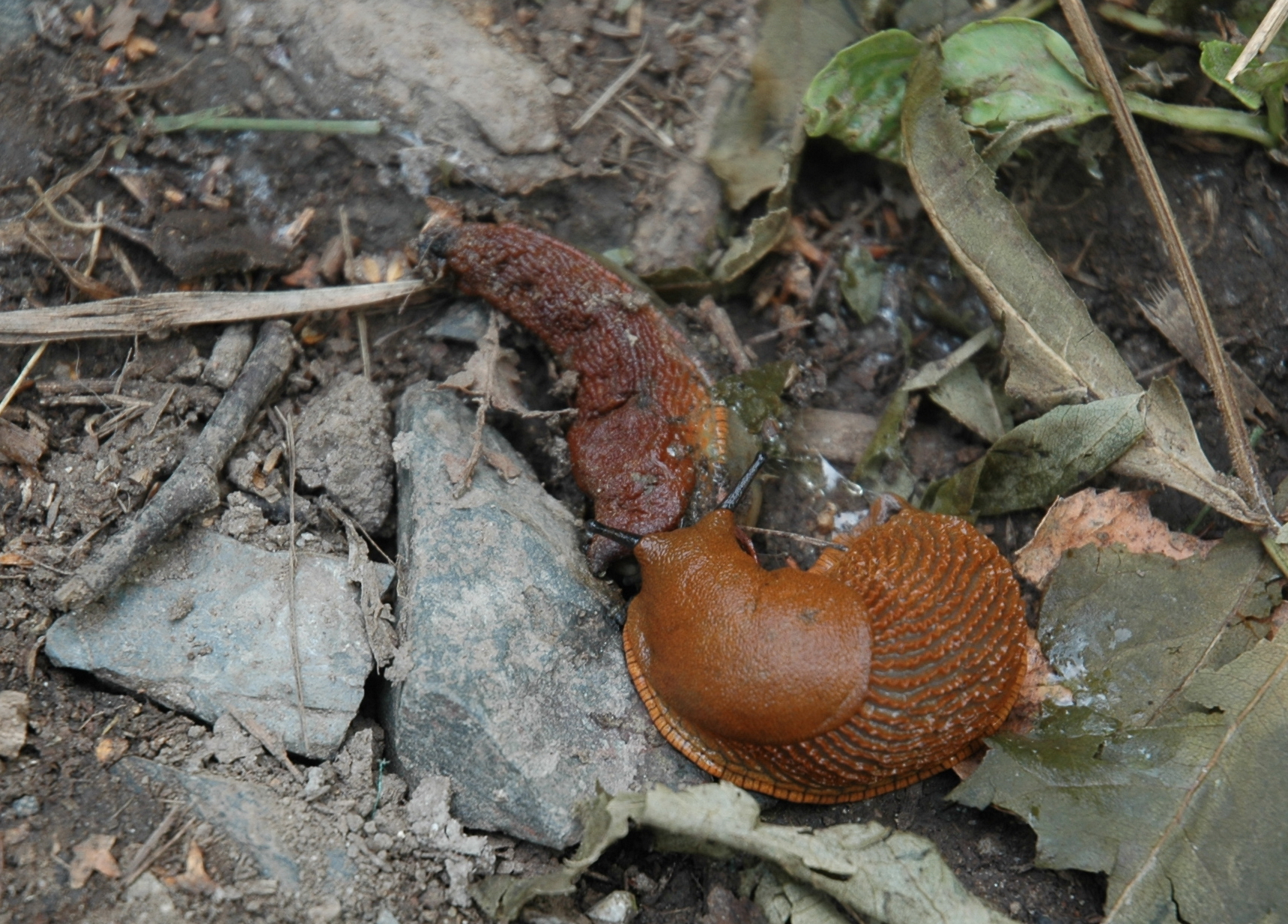
A slug, Arion vulgaris, eating a dead individual of the same species

Cannibalism is the act of consuming another individual of the same species as food. Cannibalism is a common ecological interaction in the animal kingdom and has been recorded in more than 1,500 species. Human cannibalism is also well documented, both in ancient and in recent times.

The rate of cannibalism increases in nutritionally poor environments as individuals turn to members of their own species as an additional food source. Cannibalism regulates population numbers, making resources such as food, shelter and territory more readily available with the decrease of potential competition. Although it may benefit the individual, it has been shown that the presence of cannibalism decreases the expected survival rate of the whole population and increases the risk of consuming a relative. Other negative effects may include the increased risk of pathogen transmission as the encounter rate of hosts increases. Cannibalism, however, does not—as once believed—occur only as a result of extreme food shortage or of artificial/unnatural conditions, but may also occur under natural conditions in a variety of species.

At the ecosystem level, cannibalism is most common in aquatic settings, though even here it is not necessarily frequent. One study of approximately 12,000 wild fish found that only around 0.3% of them had practised cannibalism during their last meals. Cannibalism is not restricted to carnivorous species: it also occurs in herbivores and in detritivores. Sexual cannibalism normally involves the consumption of the male by the female individual before, during or after copulation. Other forms of cannibalism include size-structured cannibalism and intrauterine cannibalism. Behavioral, physiological and morphological adaptations have evolved to decrease the rate of cannibalism in individual species.

== Benefits ==
In environments where food availability is constrained, individuals can receive extra nutrition and energy if they use members of their own species, also known as conspecifics, as an additional food source. This would, in turn, increase the survival rate of the cannibal and thus provide an evolutionary advantage in environments where food is scarce. For example, female Fletcher's frogs lay their eggs in ephemeral pools that lack food resources. Therefore, in order to survive, tadpoles within the same clutch are forced to consume each other and exploit their conspecifics as the only available source of nutrition. A study conducted on another amphibian, the wood frog, tadpoles showed that those that exhibited cannibalistic tendencies had faster growth rates and higher fitness levels than non-cannibals. An increase of size and growth would give them the added benefit of protection from potential predators such as other cannibals and give them an advantage when competing for resources.

The nutritional benefits of cannibalism may allow for the more efficient conversion of a conspecific diet into reusable resources than a fully herbaceous diet, as herbaceous diets may consist of excess elements which the animal has to expend energy to get rid of. This facilitates faster development; however, a trade-off may occur as there may be less time to ingest these acquired resources. Studies have shown that there is a noticeable size difference between animals fed on a high conspecific diet which were smaller compared to those fed on a low conspecific diet. Hence, individual fitness could only be increased if the balance between developmental rate and size were balanced out, with studies showing that this is achieved in low conspecific diets.

In some insects, cannibalism is used to control population. In confused flour beetles, population density is lowered by cannibalism when crowding occurs.

Cannibalism regulates population numbers and benefits the cannibalistic individual and its kin, as resources such as extra shelter, territory and food are freed, thereby increasing the fitness of the cannibal by lowering crowding effects. However, this is the case only if the cannibal recognizes its own kin, as this will not hinder any future chances of perpetuating its genes in future generations. The elimination of competition can also increase mating opportunities, allowing further spread of an individual's genes.

== Costs ==
Animals which have diets consisting of predominantly conspecific prey expose themselves to a greater risk of injury and expend more energy foraging for suitable prey as compared to non-cannibalistic species.

Predators often target younger or more vulnerable prey. However, the time necessitated by such selective predation could result in a failure to meet the predator's self-set nutritional requirements. In addition, the consumption of conspecific prey may also involve the ingestion of defense compounds and hormones, which have the capacity to impact the developmental growth of the cannibal's offspring. Hence, predators normally partake in a cannibalistic diet in conditions where alternative food sources are absent or not as readily available.

Failure to recognize kin prey is also a disadvantage, provided cannibals target and consume younger individuals. For example, a male stickleback fish may often mistake their own "eggs" for their competitor's eggs, and hence would inadvertently eliminate some of its own genes from the available gene pool. Kin recognition has been observed in tadpoles of the spadefoot toad, with cannibalistic tadpoles of the same clutch tending to avoid consuming and harming siblings, while eating non-siblings.

The act of cannibalism may also facilitate trophic disease transmission within a population, though cannibalistically spread pathogens and parasites generally employ alternative modes of infection.

== Diseases transmitted through cannibalism ==
Cannibalism can potentially reduce the prevalence of parasites in the population by decreasing the number of susceptible hosts and indirectly killing the parasite in the host. It has been shown in some studies that the risk of encountering an infected victim increases when there is a higher cannibalism rate, though this risk drops as the number of available hosts decreases. However, this is only the case if the risk of disease transmission is low. Cannibalism is an ineffective method of disease spread as cannibalism in the animal kingdom is normally a one-on-one interaction, and the spread of disease requires group cannibalism; thereby it is rare for a disease to have evolved to rely solely on cannibalism to spread. Usually there are different means of transmission, such as with direct contact, maternal transmission, coprophagy, and necrophagy with different species. Research results indicate that infected individuals are more likely to be consumed than non-infected ones, hence the risk of contracting diseases may reduce the prevalence of cannibalism in a population.

Some examples of diseases transmitted by cannibalism in mammals include the human disease kuru, a prion disease that degenerates the brain. This disease was prevalent in Papua New Guinea where tribes practiced endocannibalism in cannibalistic funeral rituals and consume the brains infected by these prions. It is a cerebellar dysfunctional disease which has symptoms including a broad-based gait and decreased motor activity control; however, the disease has a long incubation period and symptoms may not appear until years later.

Bovine spongiform encephalopathy, or mad cow disease, is another prion disease which is usually caused by feeding contaminated bovine tissue to other cattle. It is a neurodegenerative disease and could be spread to humans if the individual were to consume contaminated beef. The spread of parasites such as nematodes may also be facilitated by cannibalism, since eggs from these parasites are transferred more easily from one host to another.

Other forms of diseases include sarcocystis and iridovirus in reptiles and amphibians, granulosus virus, chagas disease, and microsporidia in insects, and stained prawn disease, white spot syndrome, helminthes and tapeworms in crustaceans and fish.

== Foraging dynamics ==
Cannibalism may become apparent when direct competition for limited resources forces individuals to use other conspecific individuals as an additional resource to maintain their metabolic rates. Hunger drives individuals to increase their foraging rates, which in turn decreases their attack threshold and tolerance to other conspecific individuals. As resources dwindle, individuals are forced to change their behaviour which may lead to animal migration, confrontation, or cannibalism.

Cannibalism rates increase with increasing population density as it becomes more advantageous to prey on conspecific organisms than to forage in the environment. This is because the encounter rate between predator and prey increases, making cannibalism more convenient and beneficial than foraging within the environment. Over time, the dynamics within the population change as those with cannibalistic tendencies may receive additional nutritional benefits and increase the size ratio of predator to prey. The presence of smaller prey, or prey which are at a vulnerable stage of their life cycle, increases the chances of cannibalism occurring due to the reduced risk of injury. A feedback loop occurs when increasing rates of cannibalism decreases population densities, leading to an increased abundance of alternative food sources; making it more beneficial to forage within the environment than for cannibalism to occur. When population numbers and foraging rates increase, the carrying capacity for that resource in the area may be reached, thus forcing individuals to look for other resources such as conspecific prey.

== Sexual cannibalism ==
Sexual cannibalism is present largely in spiders and other invertebrates, including gastropods. This refers to the killing and consumption of conspecific sexual partners during courtship, and during or after copulation. Normally, it is the female which consumes the conspecific male organism, though there have been some reported cases of the male consuming the adult female, however, this has only been recorded under laboratory conditions. Sexual cannibalism has been recorded in the female redback spider, black widow spider, praying mantis, and scorpion, among others.

In most species of spiders, the consumption of the male individual occurs before copulation and the male fails to transfer his sperm into the female. This may be due to mistaken identity such as in the case of the orb weaving spider which holds little tolerance to any spider which is present in its web and may mistake the vibrations for those of a prey item. Other reasons for male consumption before mating may include female choice and the nutritional advantages of cannibalism. The size of the male spider may play a part in determining its reproductive success as smaller males are less likely to be consumed during pre-copulation; however, larger males may be able to prevent the smaller ones from gaining access to the female. There exists a conflict of interest between males and females, as females may be more inclined to turn to cannibalism as a source of nutritional intake while the male's interest is mostly focused on ensuring paternity of the future generations. It was found that cannibalistic females produced offspring with greater survival rates than non-cannibalistic females, as cannibals produced greater clutches and larger egg sizes. Hence, species such as the male dark fishing spider of the family Dolomedes self-sacrifice and spontaneously die during copulation to facilitate their own consumption by the female, thereby increasing the chance of survivorship of future offspring.

Sexual dimorphism has been theorised to have arisen from sexual selection as smaller males were captured more easily than larger males; however, it is also possible that sexual cannibalism only occurs due to the difference in size between male and females. Data comparing female and male spider body length shows that there is little support for the prior theory as there is not much correlation between body size and the presence of sexual cannibalism. Not all species of spiders which partake in sexual cannibalism exhibit size dimorphism.

The avoidance of sexual cannibalism is present in males of certain species to increase their rate of survival, as they uses cautionary methods to lower the risk of his consumption. Male orb weaving spiders would often wait for females to moult or to finish eating before attempting to initiate mating, as the females are less likely to attack. Males which are vulnerable to post-copulation consumption may gather mating thread to generate a mechanical tension which they could use to spring away after insemination, while other spiders such as the crab spider may tangle the female's legs in webs to reduce the risk of the female capturing him. Male choice is common in mantids, with males preferring fatter females because they pose a lower risk of attack and hesitating to approach starved females.

== Size-structured cannibalism ==
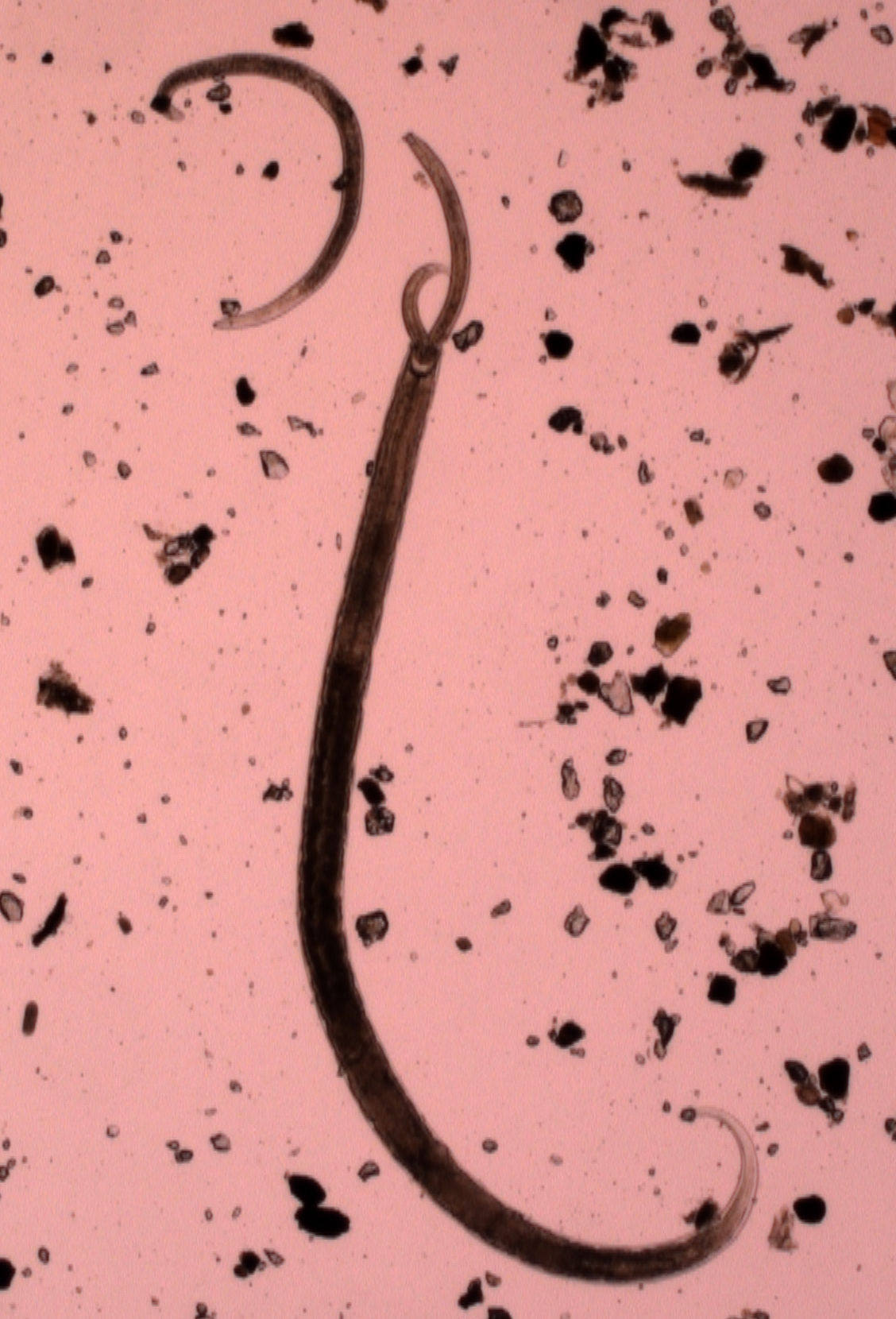
Nematode of the order Mononchida eating another Mononchid

Size-structured cannibalism is cannibalism in which older, larger, more mature individuals consume smaller, younger conspecifics. In size-structured populations, (where populations are made of individuals of various sizes, ages, and maturities), cannibalism can be responsible for 8% (Belding's ground squirrel) to 95% (dragonfly larvae) of the total mortality, making it a significant and important factor for population and community dynamics.

Size-structured cannibalism has commonly been observed in the wild for a variety of taxa. Vertebrate examples include chimpanzees, where groups of adult males have been observed to attack and consume infants.

=== Filial cannibalism ===
Filial cannibalism is a specific type of size-structured cannibalism in which adults eat their own offspring. Although most often thought of as parents eating live young, filial cannibalism includes parental consumption of stillborn infants and miscarried fetuses as well as infertile and still-incubating eggs. Vertebrate examples include pigs, where cannibalistic piglet savaging occurs at a rate of about 0.3% and is considered to be an abnormal behavior. However, consumption by the sow of already dead piglets that were stillborn or accidentally crushed occurs at a much higher rate and is considered normal.

Filial cannibalism is particularly common in teleost fishes, appearing in at least seventeen different families of teleosts. Within this diverse group of fish, there have been many, variable explanations of the possible adaptive value of filial cannibalism. One of these is the energy-based hypothesis, which suggests that fish eat their offspring when they are low on energy as an investment in future reproductive success. This has been supported by experimental evidence, showing that male three-spined sticklebacks, male tessellated darters, and male sphinx blenny fish all consume or absorb their own eggs to maintain their physical conditions. In other words, when males of a fish species are low on energy, it might sometimes be beneficial for them to feed on their own offspring to survive and invest in future reproductive success.

Another hypothesis as to the adaptive value of filial cannibalism in teleosts is that it increases density-dependent egg survivorship. In other words, filial cannibalism simply increases overall reproductive success by helping the other eggs make it to maturity by thinning out the numbers. Possible explanations as to why this is so include increasing oxygen availability to the remaining eggs, the negative effects of accumulating embryo waste, and predation.

In some species of eusocial wasps, such as Polistes chinensis, the reproducing female will kill and feed younger larvae to her older brood. This occurs under food stressed conditions in order to ensure that the first generation of workers emerges without delay. Further evidence also suggests that occasionally filial cannibalism might occur as a by-product of cuckoldry in fish. Males consume broods, which may include their own offspring, when they believe a certain percentage of the brood contains genetic material that is not theirs.

It is not always the parent that cannibalizes the offspring; in some spiders, mothers have been observed to feed themselves to their brood as the ultimate provision from mother to children, known as matriphagy.

The dinosaur Coelophysis was once suspected to practice this form of cannibalism but this turned out to be wrong, although Deinonychus may have done so. Skeletal remains from subadults with missing parts are suspected of having been eaten by other Deinonychus, mainly full-grown adults.

=== Infanticide ===
Infanticide is the killing of a non-adult animal by an adult of the same species. Infanticide is often accompanied by cannibalism. It is often displayed in lions; a male lion encroaching on the territory of a rival pride will often kill any existing cubs fathered by other males; this brings the lionesses into heat more quickly, enabling the invading lion to sire his own young. This is an example of cannibalistic behaviour in a genetic context.

In many species of Lepidoptera, such as Cupido minimus and the Indianmeal moth, the first larvae to hatch will consume the other eggs or smaller larvae on the host plant, decreasing competition.

== Intrauterine cannibalism ==
Intrauterine cannibalism is a behaviour in some carnivorous species, in which multiple embryos are created at impregnation, but only one or two are born. The larger or stronger ones consume their less-developed siblings as a source of nutrients.

In adelphophagy or embryophagy, the fetus eats sibling embryos, while in oophagy it feeds on eggs.

Adelphophagy occurs in some marine gastropods (calyptraeids, muricids, vermetids, and buccinids) and in some marine annelids (Boccardia proboscidia in Spionidae).

Intrauterine cannibalism is known to occur in lamnoid sharks such as the sand tiger shark, and in the fire salamander, as well as in some teleost fishes. The Carboniferous period chimaera, Delphyodontos dacriformes, is suspected of having practiced intrauterine cannibalism, also, due to the sharp teeth of the recently born (or possibly aborted) juveniles, and the presence of fecal matter in the juveniles' intestines.

== Protection against cannibalism ==
Animals have evolved protection to prevent and deter potential predators such as those from their own kind. Many amphibian eggs are gelatinous and toxic to decrease edibility. Often, adults would lay their eggs in crevices, holes, or empty nesting sites to hide their eggs from potential conspecific predators which tend to ingest the eggs for an additional nutritional benefit or to get rid of genetic competition. In amphibians, the development of non-aquatic egg deposition has helped increase the survival rates of their young by the evolution of viviparity or direct development. In bees, worker policing occurs to prohibit worker reproduction: workers detect and cannibalize eggs laid by fellow workers. Queen-laid eggs have a different scent than worker-laid eggs, allowing workers to tell them apart and nurture the queen's eggs instead of cannibalizing them. Parental presence at nesting sites is also a common method of protection against infanticide committed by conspecific individuals, with the parent exhibits defensive displays to ward off potential predators. Parental investment in newborns are generally higher during their early stages of development, with behaviours such as aggression, territorial behaviour, and pregnancy blocking becoming more apparent.

Morphological plasticity helps an individual account for different predation stresses, thereby increasing individual survival rates. Japanese brown frog tadpoles have been shown to exhibit morphological plasticity when they are in a high stress environment where cannibalism between tadpoles and more developed individuals were present. Shifting their morphology plays a key role in their survival, creating bulkier bodies when put into environments where more developed tadpoles were present, to make it difficult for the individuals to swallow them whole. Diet shifts between different stages of development have also evolved to decrease competition between each stage, thereby increasing the amount of food availability so that there is a decreased chance that the individuals will turn to cannibalism as an additional food source.

== See also ==
- Anthropophage
- Cannibalism in poultry
- Fall armyworm § Cannibalism
- Man-eating animal
- Uruguayan Air Force Flight 571
