= Parent–offspring conflict =

Evolutionary conflict arising from differences in optimal parental investment

Parent–offspring conflict (POC) is an expression coined in 1974 by Robert Trivers. It is used to describe the evolutionary conflict arising from differences in optimal parental investment (PI) in an offspring from the standpoint of the parent and the offspring. PI is any investment by the parent in an individual offspring that decreases the parent's ability to invest in other offspring, while the selected offspring's chance of surviving increases.

POC occurs in sexually reproducing species and is based on a genetic conflict: Parents are equally related to each of their offspring and are therefore expected to equalize their investment among them. Offspring are only half or less related to their siblings (and fully related to themselves), so they try to get more PI than the parents intended to provide even at their siblings' disadvantage. However, POC is limited by the close genetic relationship between parent and offspring: If an offspring obtains additional PI at the expense of its siblings, it decreases the number of its surviving siblings. Therefore, any gene in an offspring that leads to additional PI decreases (to some extent) the number of surviving copies of itself that may be located in siblings. Thus, if the costs in siblings are too high, such a gene might be selected against despite the benefit to the offspring. The problem of specifying how an individual is expected to weigh a relative against itself has been examined by W. D. Hamilton in 1964 in the context of kin selection. Hamilton's rule says that altruistic behavior will be positively selected if the benefit to the recipient multiplied by the genetic relatedness of the recipient to the performer is greater than the cost to the performer of a social act. Conversely, selfish behavior can only be favoured when Hamilton's inequality is not satisfied. This leads to the prediction that, other things being equal, POC will be stronger under half siblings (e.g., female's offspring have different fathers) than under full siblings.

== Occurrence ==
=== In plants ===
In plants, POC over the allocation of resources to the brood members may affect both brood size (number of seeds matured within a single fruit) and seed size. Concerning brood size, the most economic use of maternal resources is achieved by packing as many seeds as possible in one fruit, i.e., minimizing the cost of packing per seed. In contrast, offspring benefits from low numbers of seeds per fruit, which reduces sibling competition before and after dispersal. Conflict over seed size arises because there usually exists an inverse exponential relationship between seed size and fitness, that is, the fitness of a seed increases at a diminishing rate with resource investment but the fitness of the maternal parent has an optimum, as demonstrated by Smith and Fretwell (see also marginal value theorem). However, the optimum resource investment from the offspring's point of view would be the amount that optimizes its inclusive fitness (direct and indirect fitness), which is higher than the maternal parent's optimum.

This conflict about resource allocation is most obviously manifested in the reduction of brood size (i.e. a decrease in the proportion of ovules matured into seeds). Such reduction can be assumed to be caused by the offspring: If the maternal parent's interest were to produce as few seeds as observed, selection would not favour the production of extra ovules that do not mature into seeds. (Although other explanations for this phenomenon exist, such as genetic load, resource depletion or maternal regulation of offspring quality, they could not be supported by experiments.)

There are several possibilities how the offspring can affect paternal resource allocation to brood members. Evidence exists for siblicide by dominant embryos: Embryos formed early kill the remaining embryos through an aborting chemical. In oaks, early fertilized ovules prevent the fertilization of other ovules by inhibiting the pollen tube entry into the embryo sac. In some species, the maternal parent has evolved postfertilization abortion of few seeded pods. Nevertheless, cheating by the offspring is also possible here, namely by late siblicide, when the postfertilization abortion has ceased.

According to the general POC model, reduction of brood size – if caused by POC – should depend on genetic relatedness between offspring in a fruit. Indeed, abortion of embryos is more common in out-crossing than in self-pollinating plants (seeds in cross-pollinating plants are less related than in self-pollinating plants). Moreover, the level of solicitation of resources by the offspring is also increased in cross-pollinating plants: There are several reports that the average weight of crossed seeds is greater than of seeds produced by self-fertilization.

=== In birds ===
Some of the earliest examples of parent-offspring conflict were seen in bird broods and especially in raptor species. While parent birds often lay two eggs and attempt to raise two or more young, the strongest fledgling takes a greater share of the food brought by parents and will often kill the weaker sibling (siblicide). Such conflicts have been suggested as a driving force in the evolution of optimal clutch size in birds.

In the blue-footed booby, parent-offspring conflict results in times of food scarcity. When there is less food available in a given year, the older, dominant chick will often kill the younger chick by either attacking directly, or by driving it from the nest. Parents try to prevent siblicide by building nests with steeper sides and by laying heavier second eggs.

=== In mammals ===
Even before POC theory arose, debates took place over whether infants wean themselves or mothers actively wean their infants. Furthermore, it was discussed whether maternal rejections increase infant independence. It turned out that both mother and infant contribute to infant independence. Maternal rejections can be followed by a short-term increase in infant contact but they eventually result in a long-term decrease of contact as has been shown for several primates: In wild baboons infants that are rejected early and frequently spend less time in contact whereas those that are not rejected stay much longer in the proximity of their mother and suckle or ride even in advanced ages. In wild chimpanzees an abrupt increase in maternal rejections and a decrease in mother-offspring contact is found when mothers resume estrus and consort with males. In rhesus macaques a high probability of conception in the following mating season is associated with a high rate of maternal rejection. Rejection and behavioral conflicts can occur during the first months of an infant's life and when the mother resumes estrus. These findings suggest that the reproduction of the mother is influenced by the interaction with their offspring. So there is a potential for conflicts over PI. It was also observed in rhesus macaques that the number of contacts made by offspring is significantly higher than the number of contacts made by mother during a mating season, whereas the opposite holds for the number of broken contacts. This fact suggests that the mother resists offspring's demands for contact, whereas offspring is apparently more interested in spending time in contact. At three months of infant age a shift from mother to infant in responsibility for maintaining contact takes place. So when the infant becomes more independent, its effort to maintain proximity to its mother increases. This might sound paradoxical but becomes clear when one takes into account that POC increases during the period of PI. In summary, all these findings are consistent with POC-theory.

One might object that time in contact is not a reasonable measure for PI and that, for example, time for milk transfer (lactation) would be a better one. Here one can argue that mother and infant have different thermoregulatory needs due to the fact that they have different surface-to-volume ratios resulting in more rapid loss of heat in infants compared to adults. So infants may be more sensitive to low temperatures than their mothers. An infant might try to compensate by increased contact time with their mother, which could initiate a behavioral conflict over time. Consistency of this hypothesis has been shown for Japanese macaques where decreasing temperatures result in higher maternal rejections and increased number of contacts made by infants.

=== In social insects ===
In eusocial species, the parent-offspring conflict takes on a unique role because of haplodiploidy and the prevalence of sterile workers. Sisters are more related to each other (0.75) than to their mothers (0.5) or brothers (0.25). In most cases, this drives female workers to try and obtain a sex ratio of 3:1 (females to males) in the colony. However, queens are equally related to both sons and daughters, so they prefer a sex ratio of 1:1. The conflict in social insects is about the level investment the queen should provide for each sex for current and future offspring. It is generally thought that workers will win this conflict and the sex ratio will be closer to 3:1, however there are examples, like in Bombus terrestris, where the queen has considerable control in forcing a 1:1 ratio.

=== In amphibians ===
Many species of frogs and salamanders display complex social behavior with highly involved parental care that includes egg attendance, tadpole transport, and tadpole feeding.

==== Energy expenditure ====
Both males and females of the strawberry poison-dart frog care for their offspring, however, females invest in more costly ways. Females of certain poison frog species produce unfertilized, non-developing trophic eggs which provide nutrition to her tadpoles. The tadpoles vibrate vigorously against mother frogs to solicit nutritious eggs. These maternal trophic eggs are beneficial for offspring, positively influencing larval survival, size at metamorphosis, and post metamorphic survival.

In the neotropical, foam-nesting pointedbelly frog (Leptodactylus podicipinus), females providing parental care to tadpoles have reduced body condition and food ingestion. Females that are attending to her offspring have significantly lower body mass, ovary mass, and stomach volume. This indicates that the cost of parental care in the pointedbelly frog has the potential to affect future reproduction of females due to the reaction in body condition and food intake.

In the Puerto Rican common coqui, parental care is performed exclusively by males and consists of attending to the eggs and tadpoles at an oviposition site. When brooding, males have a higher frequency of empty stomachs and lose a significant portion of their initial body mass during parental care. Abdominal fat bodies of brooding males during the middle of parental care were significantly smaller than those of non-brooding males. Another major behavioral component of parental care is nest defense against conspecific egg cannibals. This defense behavior includes aggressive calling, sustained biting, wrestling, and blocking directed against the nest intruder.

Females of the Allegheny Mountain dusky salamander exhibit less activity and become associated with the nest site well in advance of oviposition in preparation for the reproductive season. This results in a reduced food intake and a decrease in body weight over the brooding period. Females either stop or greatly reduce their foraging activities and instead will eat opportunistically following oviposition. Since nutritional intake is reduced, there is a decrease in body weight in females. Females of the red-backed salamander make a substantial parental investment in terms of clutch size and brooding behavior. When brooding, females usually do not leave their eggs to forage but rather rely upon their fat reserves and any resources they encounter at their oviposition site. In addition, females could experience metabolic costs while safeguarding their offspring from desiccation, intruders, and predators.

==== Time investment ====
The plasticity of tadpoles may play a role in the weaning conflict in egg-feeding frogs, in which the offspring prefer to devote resources to growth, while the mother prefers nutrients to help her young become independent. A similar conflict happens in direct-developing frogs that care for clutches, with protected tadpoles having the advantage of a slower, safer development, but they need to be ready to reach independence rapidly due to the risks of predation or desiccation.

In the neotropical Zimmerman’s poison frog, the males provide a specific parental care in the form of transportation. The tadpoles are cannibalistic, hence why the males typically separate them from their siblings after hatching by transporting them to small bodies of water. However, in some cases parents do not transport their tadpoles but let them all hatch into the same pool. In order to escape their cannibalistic siblings, the tadpoles will actively seek transportative parental care. When a male frog approaches the water body in which the tadpoles had been deposited in, tadpoles will almost “jump” on the back of the adult, mimicking an attack, while adults would not assist with this movement. While this is an obvious example of sibling conflict, the one-sided interaction between tadpoles and frogs could be seen as a form of parent-offspring conflict, in which the offspring attempts to extract more from the interaction than the parent is willing to provide. In this scenario, a tadpole climbing onto an unwilling frog— who enters the pool for reasons other than tadpole transportation, such as egg deposition, cooling off, or sleeping— might be analogous to mammalian offspring seeking to nurse after weaning. In times of danger, the tadpoles of Zimmerman’s poison frog don't passively await parental assistance but instead exhibit an almost aggressive approach in mounting the adult frogs.

==== Trade-offs with mating ====
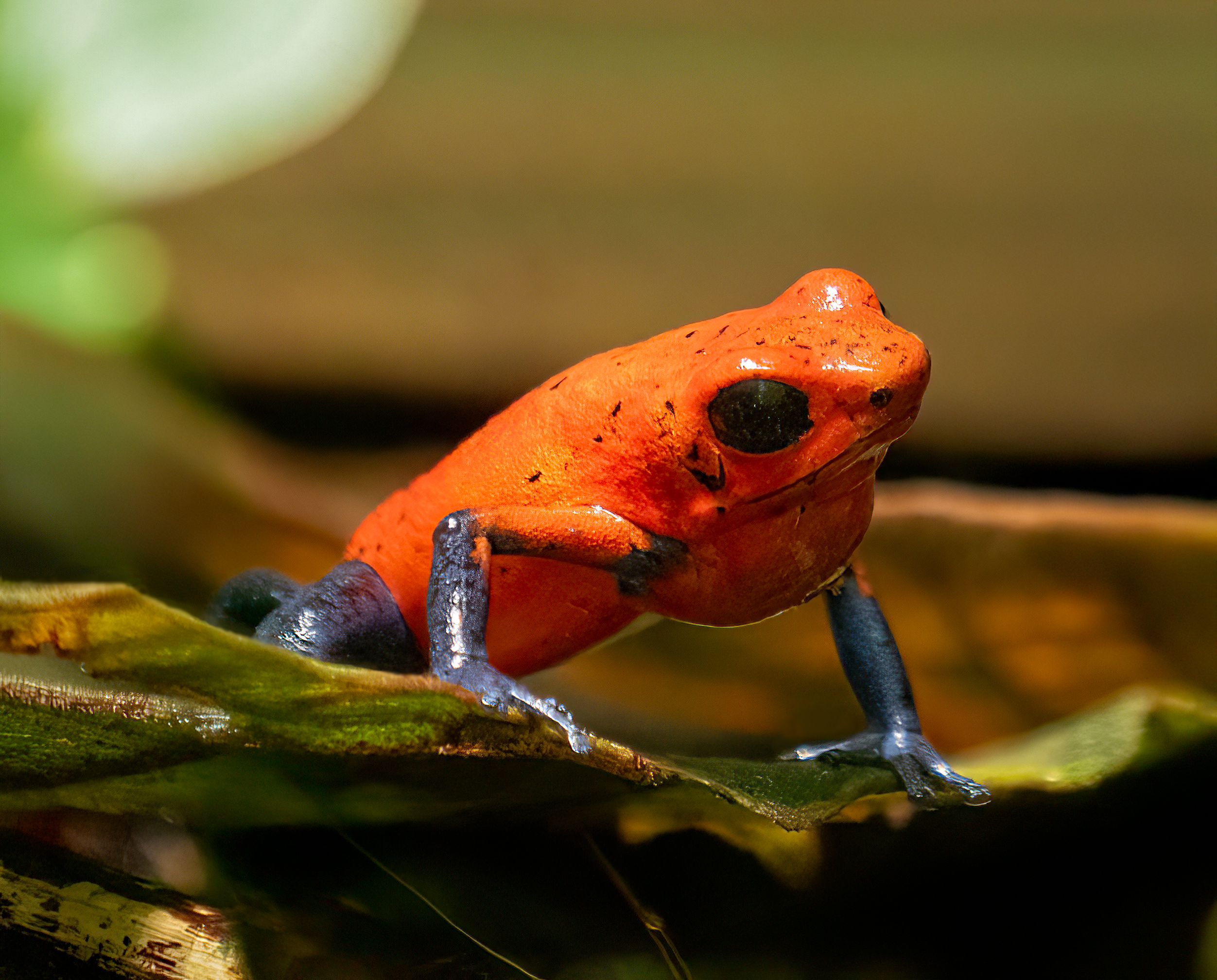
Strawberry poison-dart frog

Reproductive attempts in strawberry poison-dart frog such as courtship activity, significantly decreases or will entirely cease in tadpole-rearing females compared to non-rearing females. Most brooding males of the common coqui cease calling during parental care while gravid females are still available and known to mate, hence why non-calling males miss potential opportunities to reproduce. Caring for tadpoles comes at the cost of other current reproductive opportunities for females, leading to the hypothesis that frequent reproduction is associated with reduced survival in frogs.

=== In humans ===
An important illustration of POC within humans is provided by David Haig’s (1993) work on genetic conflicts in pregnancy. Haig argued that fetal genes would be selected to draw more resources from the mother than would be optimal for the mother to give. The placenta, for example, secretes allocrine hormones that decrease the sensitivity of the mother to insulin and thus make a larger supply of blood sugar available to the fetus. The mother responds by increasing the level of insulin in her bloodstream and to counteract this effect the placenta has insulin receptors that stimulate the production of insulin-degrading enzymes.

About 30 percent of human conceptions do not progress to full term (22 percent before becoming clinical pregnancies) creating a second arena for conflict between the mother and the fetus. The fetus will have a lower quality cut off point for spontaneous abortion than the mother. The mother's quality cut-off point also declines as she nears the end of her reproductive life, which becomes significant for older mothers. Older mothers have a higher incidence of offspring with genetic defects. Indeed, with parental age on both sides, the mutational load increases as well.

Initially, the maintenance of pregnancy is controlled by the maternal hormone progesterone, but in later stages it is controlled by the fetal human chorionic gonadotrophin released into the maternal bloodstream. The release of fetal human chorionic gonadotrophin causes the release of maternal progesterone. There is also conflict over blood supply to the placenta, with the fetus being prepared to demand a larger blood supply than is optimal for the mother (or even for itself, since high birth weight is a risk factor). This results in hypertension and, significantly, high birth weight is positively correlated with maternal blood pressure.

=== A tripartite (fetus–mother–father) immune conflict in humans and other placentals ===
During pregnancy, there is a two-way traffic of immunologically active cell lines through the placenta. Fetal lymphocyte lines may survive in women even decades after giving birth.

== See also ==
- Intrauterine cannibalism
- The kinship theory of genomic imprinting
- Intragenomic and intrauterine conflict in humans
