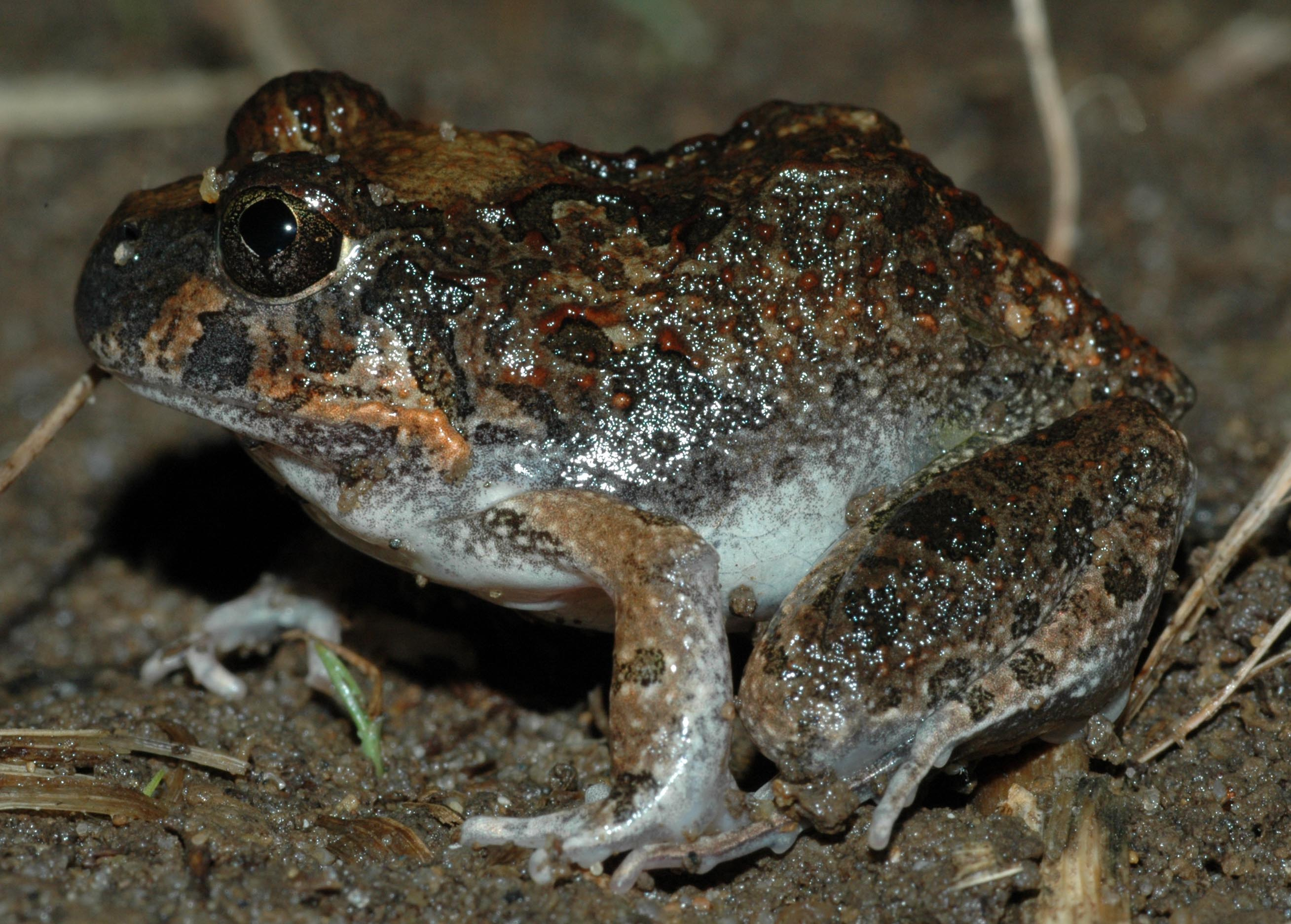
- Ornate burrowing frog (P. ornatum)

Scientific classification
- Kingdom: Animalia
- Phylum: Chordata
- Class: Amphibia
- Order: Anura
- Family: Limnodynastidae
- Genus: Platyplectrum; Günther, 1863

Species
- See text

Synonyms
- Platyplectron Peters, 1863 (missp.); Opisthodon Steindachner, 1867; Lechriodus Boulenger, 1882

= Platyplectrum =

Platyplectrum Temporal range: Early Eocene to present

Genus of frogs

Platyplectrum is a genus of ground-dwelling frog in the family Limnodynastidae. Species in this genus are found in Australia, New Guinea, and on the Aru Islands. They are medium-sized frogs and the dorsal skin has a sandpaper-like texture.

Although this genus was described in 1863 for the species Platyplectrum ornatum, in 2009 it was synonymized with the genus Opisthodon. This classification was found to be paraphyletic with respect to the former genus Lechriodus. For this reason, Platyplectrum was revived in 2021 for the members of Opisthodon and Lechriodus.

They inhabit a range of environments from arid areas to rainforests and wet sclerophyll forests, and are active after heavy rains in summer and rarely seen during drier conditions.

Breeding takes place in temporary pools and small streams and the tadpoles as well as the frogs are noted for their cannibalistic behaviour, due to which some members are commonly known as cannibal frogs. They are terrestrial and burrowing, spend much time under ground, particularly during drier periods. Breeding occurs after rain, and males call from temporary or permanent water.

The species in this genus are quite similar physically to many frogs in Limnodynastes, they also share many of the same habits of that genus including: burrowing, a "tok" like call and foamy egg nest (which in Platyplectrum breaks down after a few hours).

== Species ==
Common name	Binomial name
Morobe cannibal frog	Platyplectrum aganoposis (Zweifel, 1972)
Fletcher's frog	Platyplectrum fletcheri (Boulenger, 1890)
Wokan cannibal frog	Platyplectrum melanopyga (Doria, 1875)
Ornate burrowing frog	Platyplectrum ornatus (Gray, 1842)
Arfak cannibal frog	Platyplectrum platyceps (Parker, 1940)
Spencer's burrowing frog	Platyplectrum spenceri (Parker, 1940)

The fossil species †Platypectrum casca (Tyler & Godthelp, 1993) is known from the Early Eocene of the Tingamarra Fauna of Queensland. This is the earliest record of the family.
