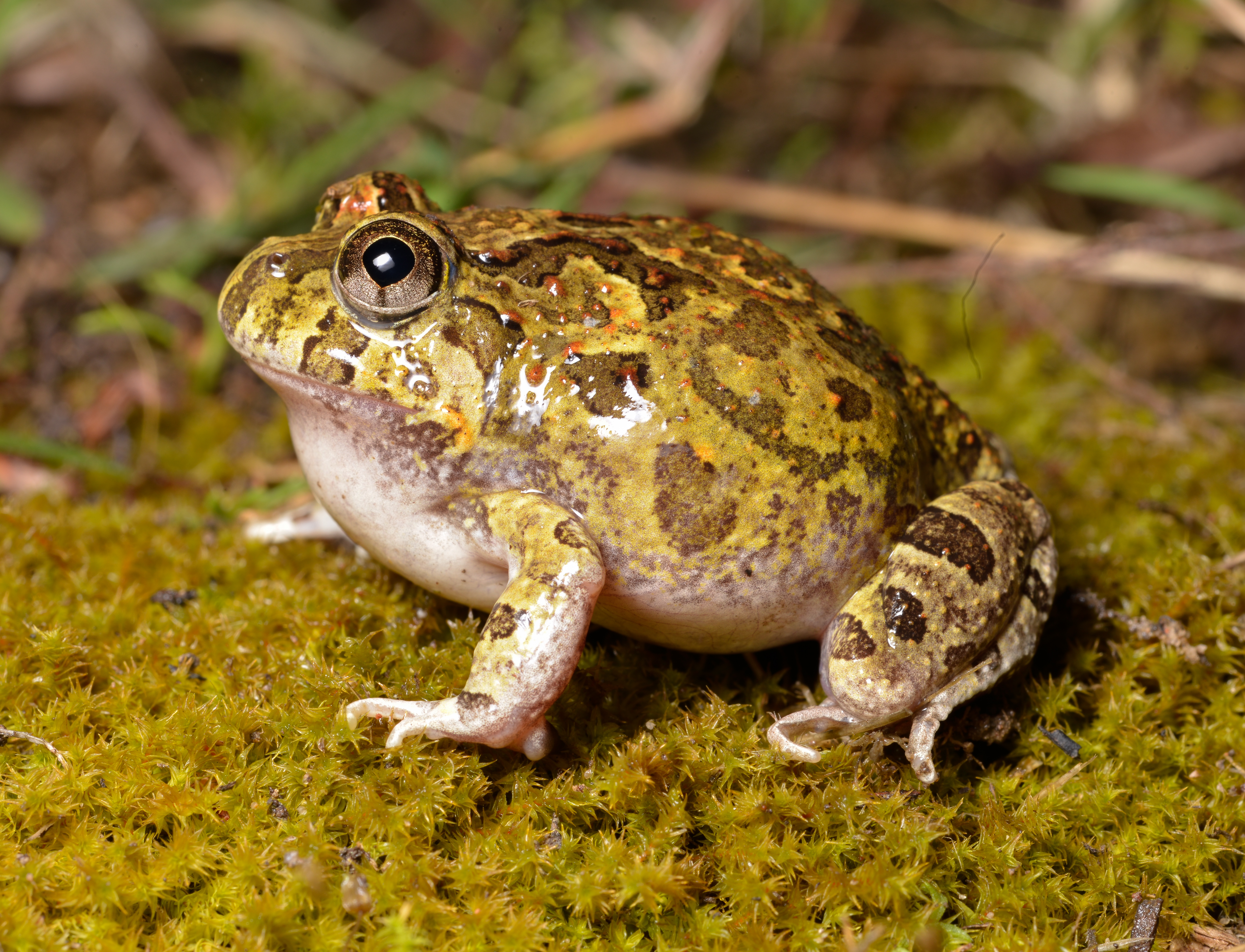

Conservation status
- Least Concern (IUCN 3.1)

Scientific classification
- Kingdom: Animalia
- Phylum: Chordata
- Class: Amphibia
- Order: Anura
- Family: Limnodynastidae
- Genus: Platyplectrum
- Species: P. ornatum

Binomial name
- Platyplectrum ornatum (Gray, 1842)
- Range of the ornate burrowing frog (Platyplectrum ornatus).

Synonyms
- Limnodynastes ornatus; Opisthodon ornastus Günther, 1859

= Ornate burrowing frog =

Species of amphibian

The ornate burrowing frog (Platyplectrum ornatum) is a species of ground frog native to Australia. It was moved to the genus Opisthodon in 2006, following a major revision of amphibians, and is now classified in the genus Platyplectrum.

== Description ==
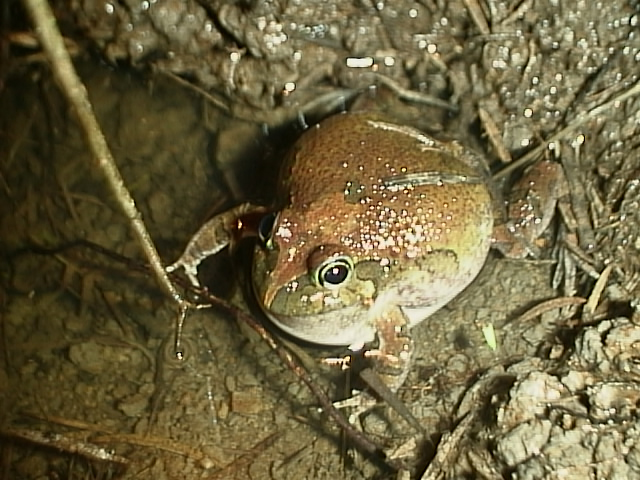
A male ornate burrowing frog calling

This frog is a relatively small and stubby species, growing no larger than 50 mm. It ranges in colour from grey to brown to yellow, and the dorsal surface patterns vary greatly between specimens. There is usually a butterfly-shaped patch behind the eyes. The dorsum is generally covered with red-tipped warts, and skin folds are present towards the head. The legs and arms are barred or spotted with darker markings. Toes have a slight webbing, while fingers have none.

It has the smallest genome known to any frog, and is even smaller than that of many birds. This is an adaptation to the desert environment where it lives. Because the ponds where they breed dries up fast in the desert, the tadpoles has to go through metamorphosis as fast as possible, which can occur just eleven days after the eggs were fertilized. A small genome gives small cells, and the smaller the cells are, the faster the tadpoles transform into small frogs and can escape the shrinking ponds.

== Ecology and behaviour ==
This species distribution ranges from western Sydney to Cape York in Queensland, running along either side of the Great Dividing Range across to Western Australia. It occurs in both wet sclerophyll forest in coastal areas and in woodland in more arid regions. As its name suggest, this species of frog burrows. It burrows feet first, enlarged tubercles on the frogs feet help them in scraping out soil. This species is usually only seen after heavy rain during spring or summer. Males call while floating in still water bodies such as dams, puddles and flooded grassland. The call is a short, nasal "unk" repeated slowly.

== Breeding ==
Breeding occurs only after heavy rain. Up to 1600 eggs are deposited in a small, dome shaped foam mass that soon collapses into a single floating film layer of eggs and jelly. Tadpoles reach 50mm but commonly only reach 36 mm in length. The dorsum is a dusky grey or brown. The side of the body has silver and/or gold flecking and the tail has grey-silver flecks.

== Similar species ==
This species looks very similar to Spencer's burrowing frog, Platyplectrum spenceri and some Neobatrachus species. It is distinguished from all of these species by the reduced webbing and mating call.
