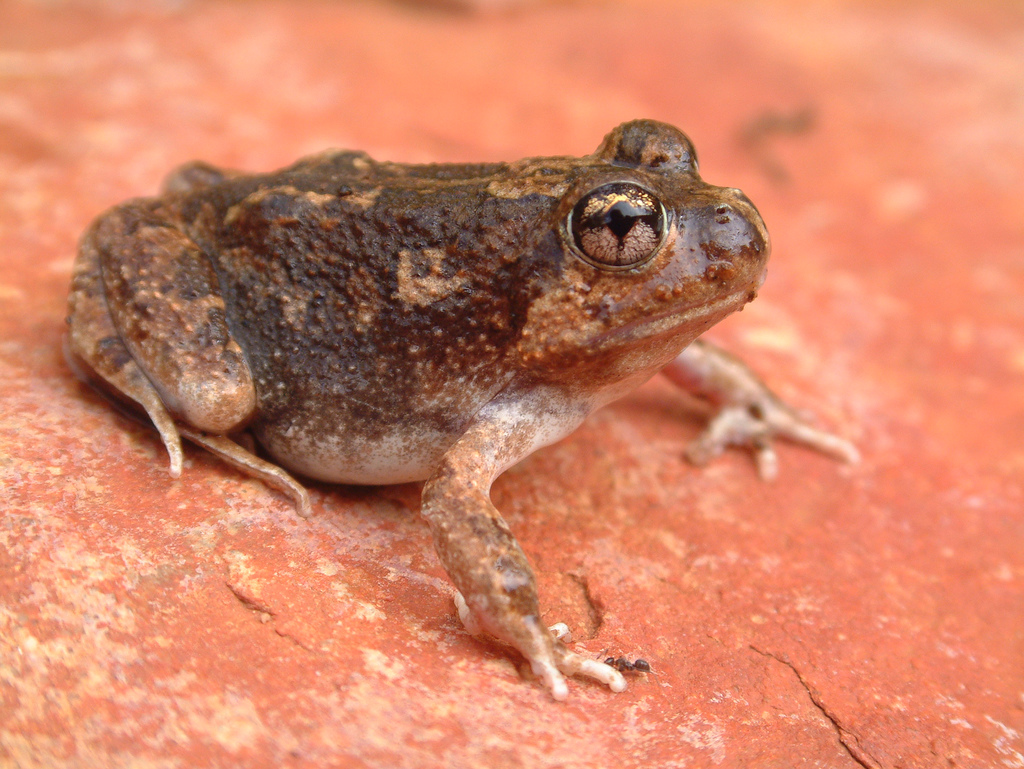

Conservation status
- Least Concern (IUCN 3.1)

Scientific classification
- Kingdom: Animalia
- Phylum: Chordata
- Class: Amphibia
- Order: Anura
- Family: Limnodynastidae
- Genus: Platyplectrum
- Species: P. spenceri

Binomial name
- Platyplectrum spenceri (Parker, 1940)

Synonyms
- Limnodynastes spenceri Parker, 1940; Opisthodon spenceri

= Spencer's burrowing frog =

Species of amphibian

Spencer's burrowing frog (Platyplectrum spenceri) is a species of frog native to western and central Australia.

== Description ==
Spencer's burrowing frog is very similar in appearance to the ornate burrowing frog (Platyplectrum ornatus). Both it and P. ornatus were moved to the genus Opisthodon in 2006, following a major revision of amphibians, and are now classified in the genus Platyplectrum. Previously, P. spenceri was classified in the genus Limnodynastes.

Spencer's burrowing frog is a short, rotund frog with a small head and large eyes. The colour and patterns of the dorsal surface vary greatly. The colour ranges from a dark brown to light grey, with darker blotches. A butterfly shaped, darker patch is often found behind the eyes. The legs and arms are striped or spotted, the tympanum is not visible, and the feet range from partially to fully webbed. The absence of webbing between the toes allows for easier burrowing.

== Ecology and behaviour ==
Spencer's burrowing frog is a fossorial frog native to the deserts of western and central Australia. During dry periods, the frog burrows underground to avoid desiccation. After a period of heavy rain, they emerge from the ground to feed and mate, laying their eggs in temporary pools of water. Tadpole development may be as short as 60 days because there is a danger that the water could dry up before the tadpoles have morphed.

Spencer's burrowing frog inhabits sandy creeks and rivers. The males will call near a water source with a rapidly repeated "hoh-hoh-hoh". Eggs are laid in foam, which breaks down in a day and releases the eggs into a layer on the top of the water.
