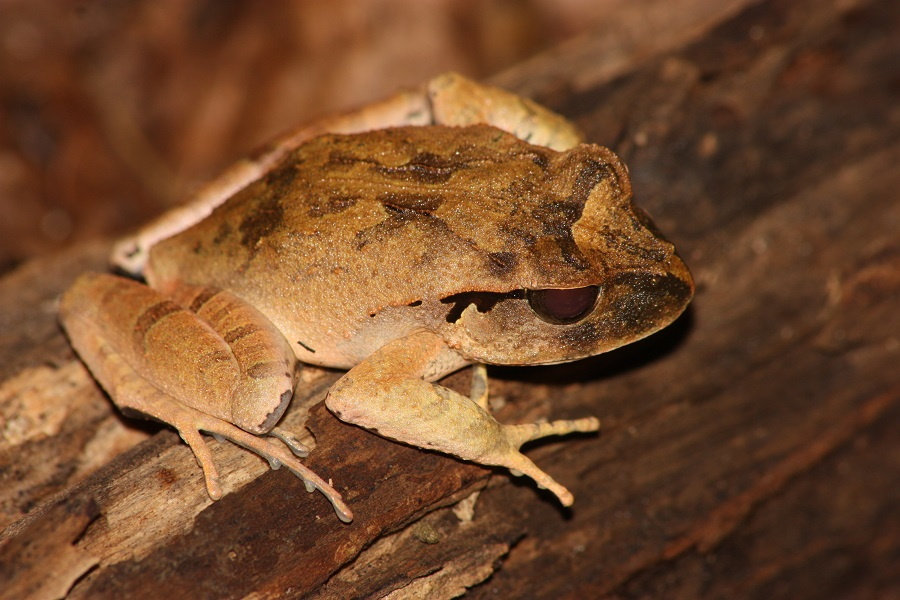
- In Porotona, Milne Bay, Papua New-Guinea

Conservation status
- Least Concern (IUCN 3.1)

Scientific classification
- Kingdom: Animalia
- Phylum: Chordata
- Class: Amphibia
- Order: Anura
- Family: Limnodynastidae
- Genus: Platyplectrum
- Species: P. melanopyga

Binomial name
- Platyplectrum melanopyga (Doria, 1875)

Synonyms
- Lechriodus melanopyga (Doria, 1875)

= Platyplectrum melanopyga =

Wokan cannibal frog

Species of amphibian

Platyplectrum melanopyga, the Wokan cannibal frog, is a species of frog in the family Limnodynastidae. It is found in New Guinea.

It was classified in the former genus Lechriodus until its synonymization with Platyplectrum in 2021.

As one of the most common amphibians of New Guinea, its natural habitats are subtropical or tropical dry forests, subtropical or tropical moist lowland forests, freshwater marshes, intermittent freshwater marshes, and plantations.
