= Platyplectrum platyceps =

Arfak cannibal frog

Conservation status
- Least Concern (IUCN 3.1)

Scientific classification
- Kingdom: Animalia
- Phylum: Chordata
- Class: Amphibia
- Order: Anura
- Family: Limnodynastidae
- Genus: Platyplectrum
- Species: P. platyceps

Binomial name
- Platyplectrum platyceps (Parker, 1940)

Synonyms
- Lechriodus platyceps Parker, 1940

Species of amphibian

Platyplectrum platyceps, the Arfak cannibal frog, is a species of frog in the family Limnodynastidae. It is endemic to West Papua, Indonesia. Its natural habitats are subtropical or tropical moist montane forests, freshwater marshes, and intermittent freshwater marshes.

It was classified in the former genus Lechriodus until its synonymization with Platyplectrum in 2021.
