= Clutch (eggs) =

Grouping of eggs in a nest

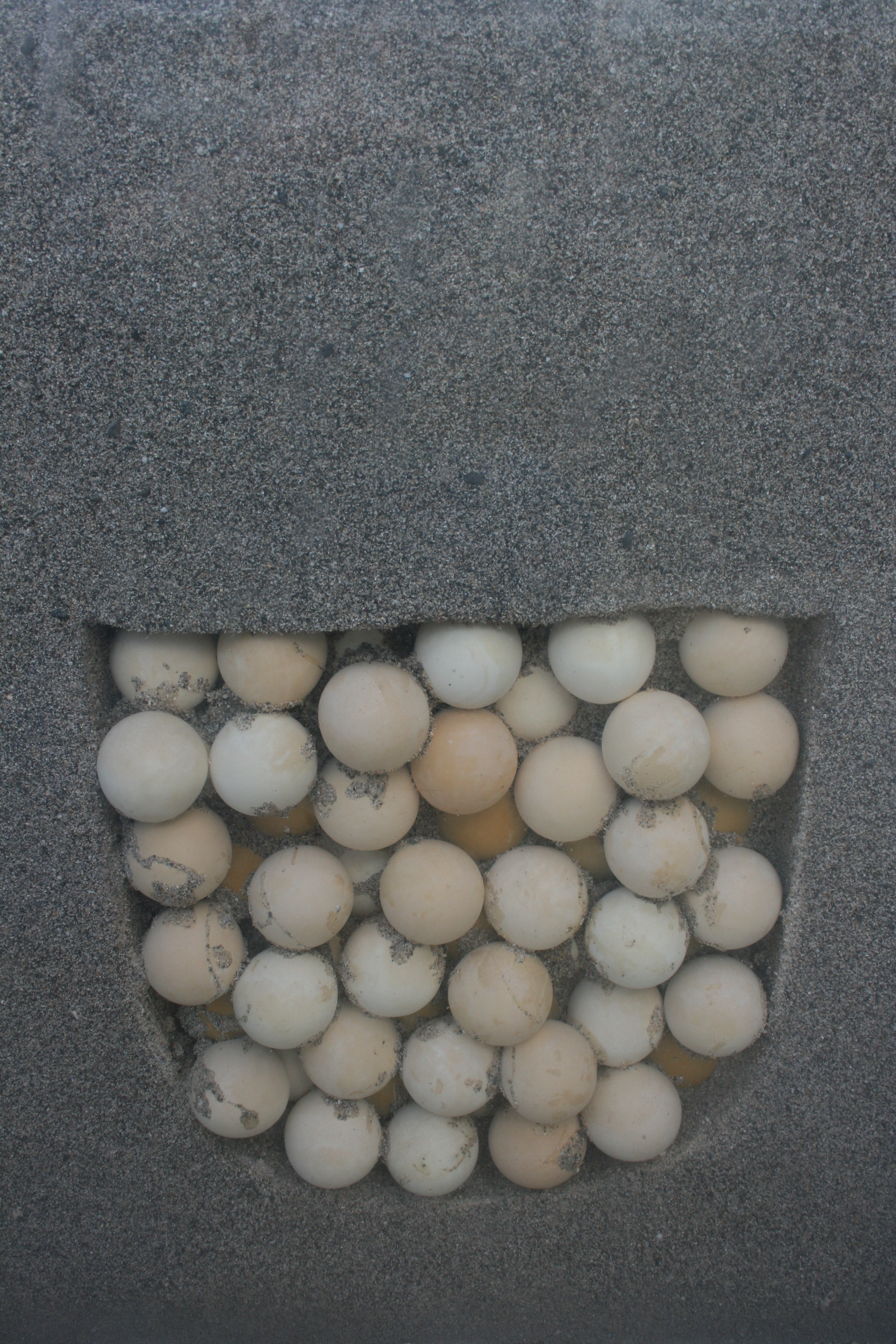
A sea turtle clutch

A clutch of eggs is the group of eggs produced by birds, amphibians, or reptiles, often at a single time, particularly those laid in a nest.

In birds, destruction of a clutch by predators (or removal by humans, for example the California condor breeding program) results in double-clutching. The technique is used to double the production of a species' eggs, in the California condor case, specifically to increase population size.

== Size ==
Clutch size differs greatly between species, sometimes even within the same genus. It may also differ within the same species due to many factors including habitat, health, nutrition, predation pressures, and time of year. Clutch size variation can also reflect variation in optimal reproduction effort. In birds, clutch size can vary within a species due to various features (age and health of laying female, ability of male to supply food, and abundance of prey), while some species are determinant layers, laying a species-specific number of eggs. Long-lived species tend to have smaller clutch sizes than short-lived species (see also r/K selection theory). The evolution of optimal clutch size is also driven by other factors, such as parent–offspring conflict.

In birds, ornithologist David Lack carried out much research into regulation of clutch size. In species with altricial young, he proposed that optimal clutch size was determined by the number of young a parent could feed until fledgling. In precocial birds, Lack determined that clutch size was determined by the nutrients available to egg-laying females. An experimental study in brant geese (Branta bernicla), which rarely lay more than five eggs, found that the probability of an egg successfully leading to a fledged gosling declined from 0.81 for two-egg clutches to 0.50 for seven-egg clutches, whilst the nesting period increased with the increasing number of eggs laid. This suggests that there is no benefit for female brant geese to lay more than five eggs.

== Gallery ==
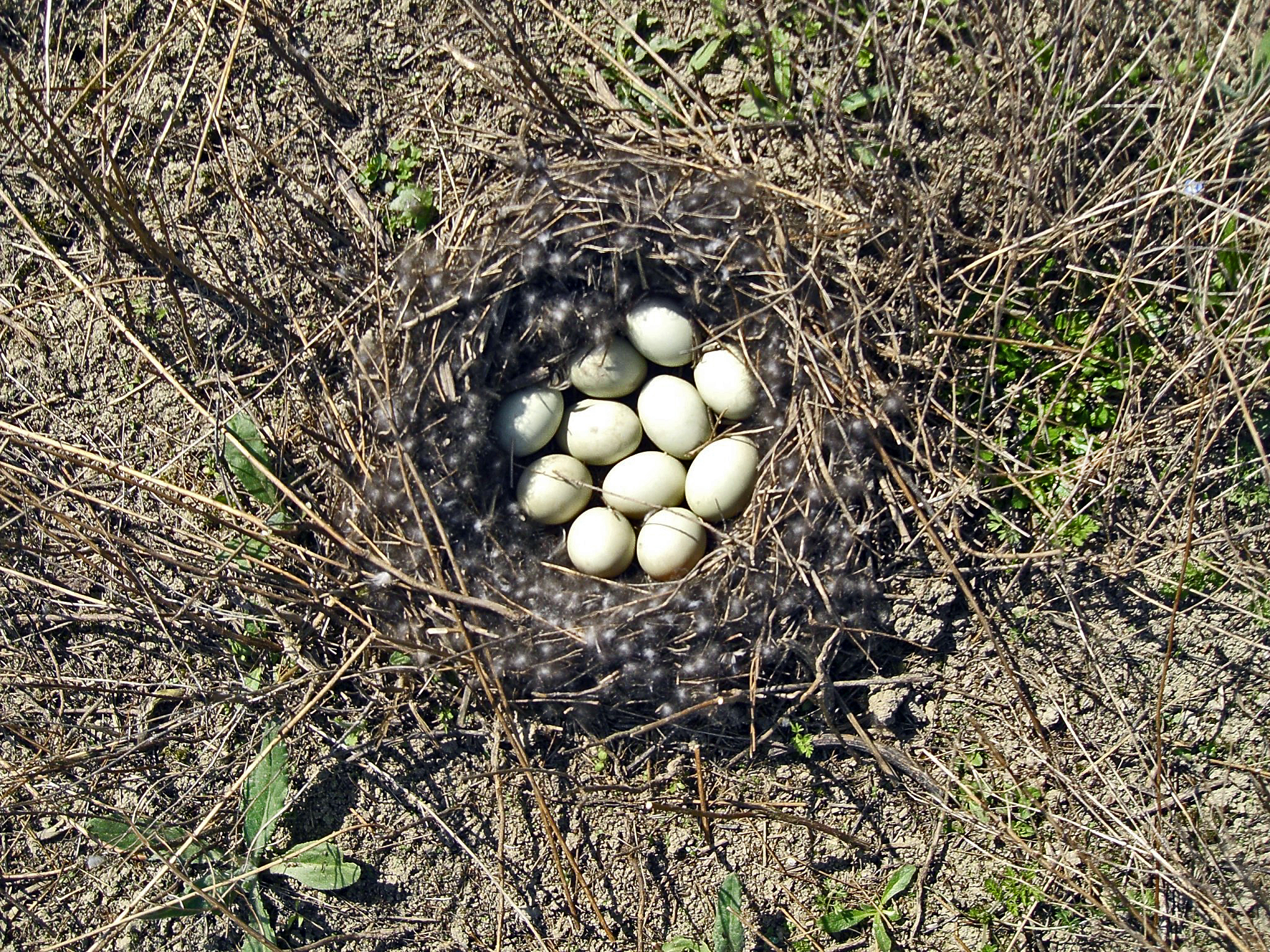
Mallard (Anas platyrhynchos), very large clutch or possibly from two females

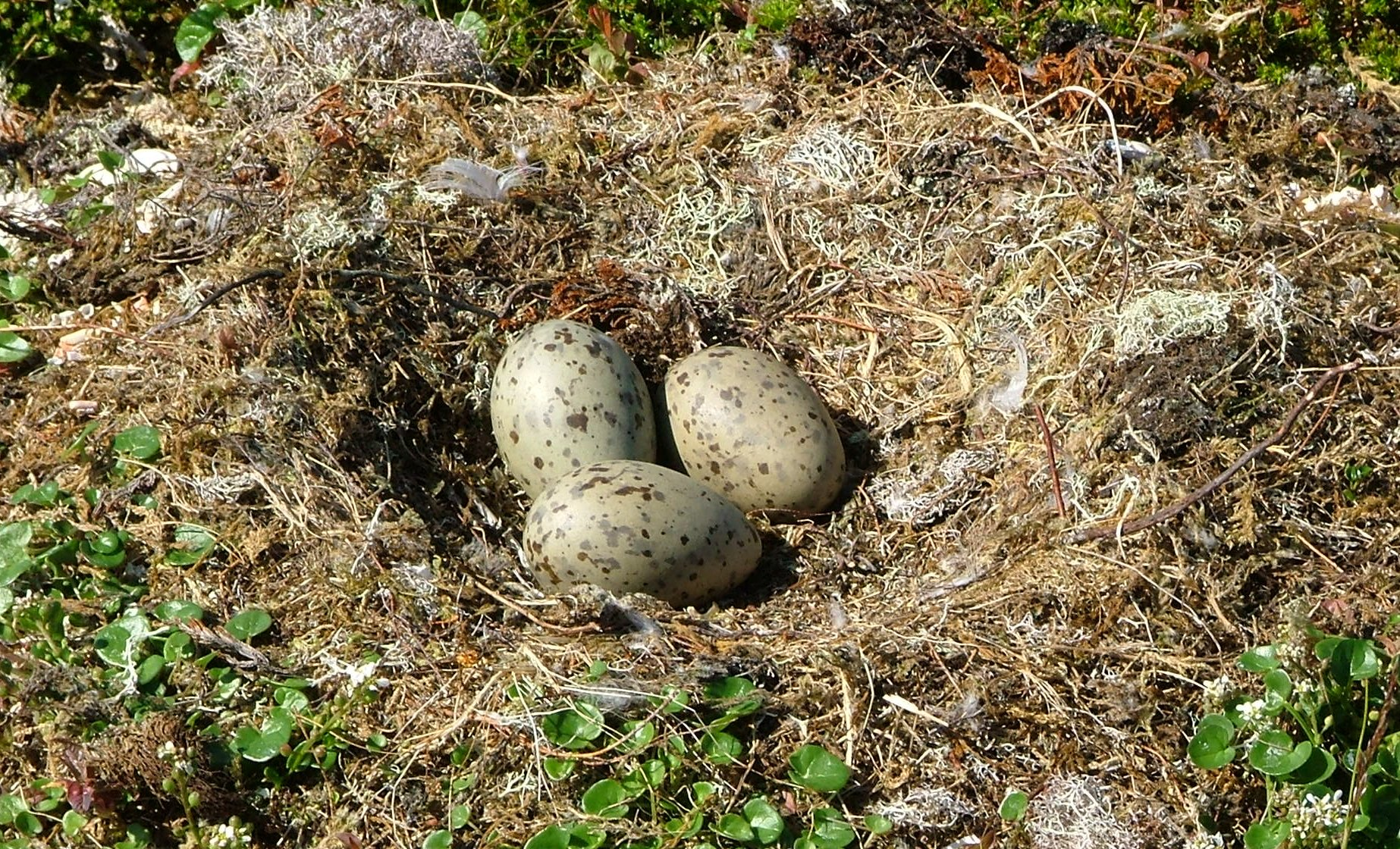
Great black-backed gull (Larus marinus), small clutch

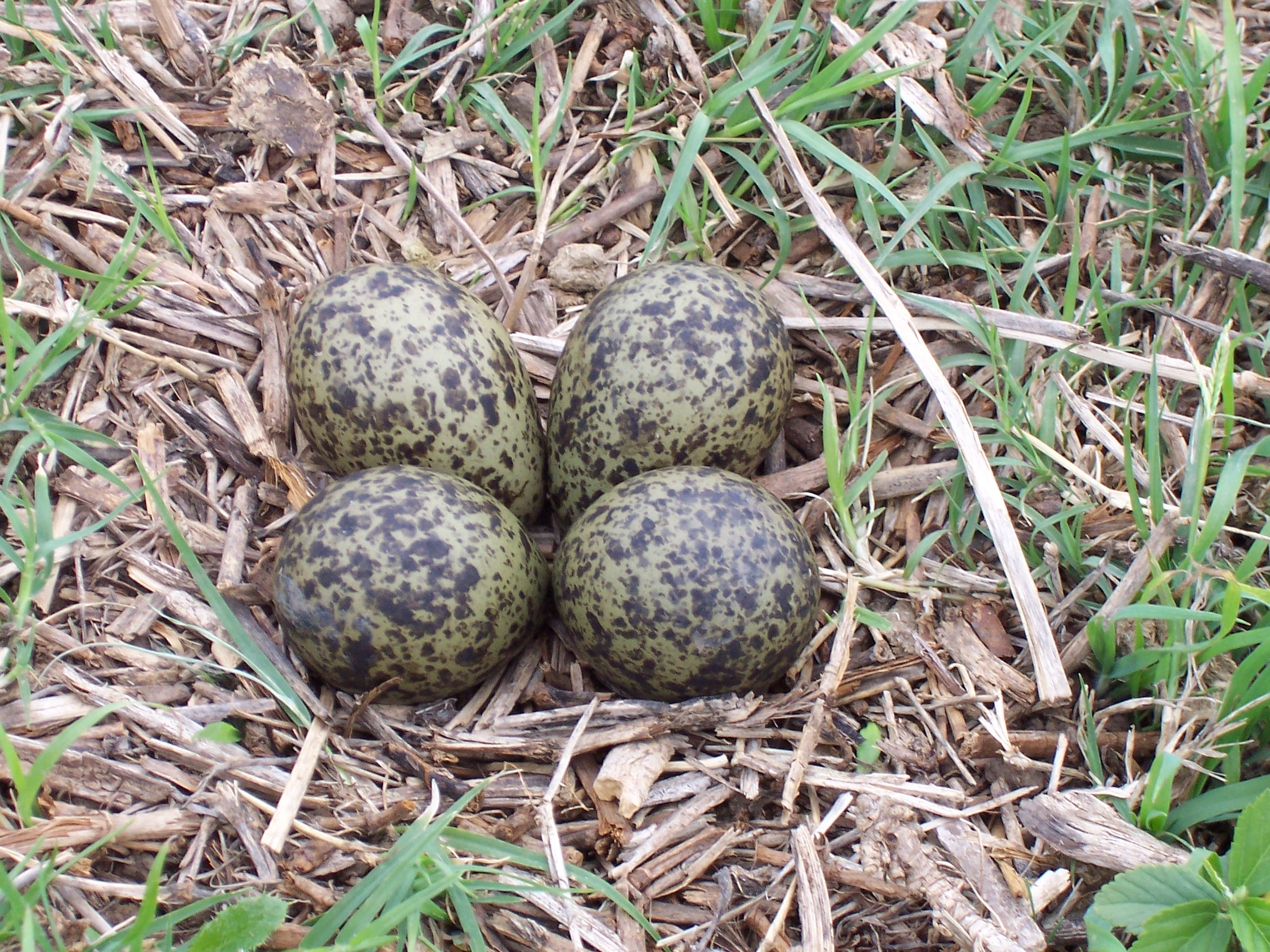
Masked lapwing (Vanellus miles), typical clutch

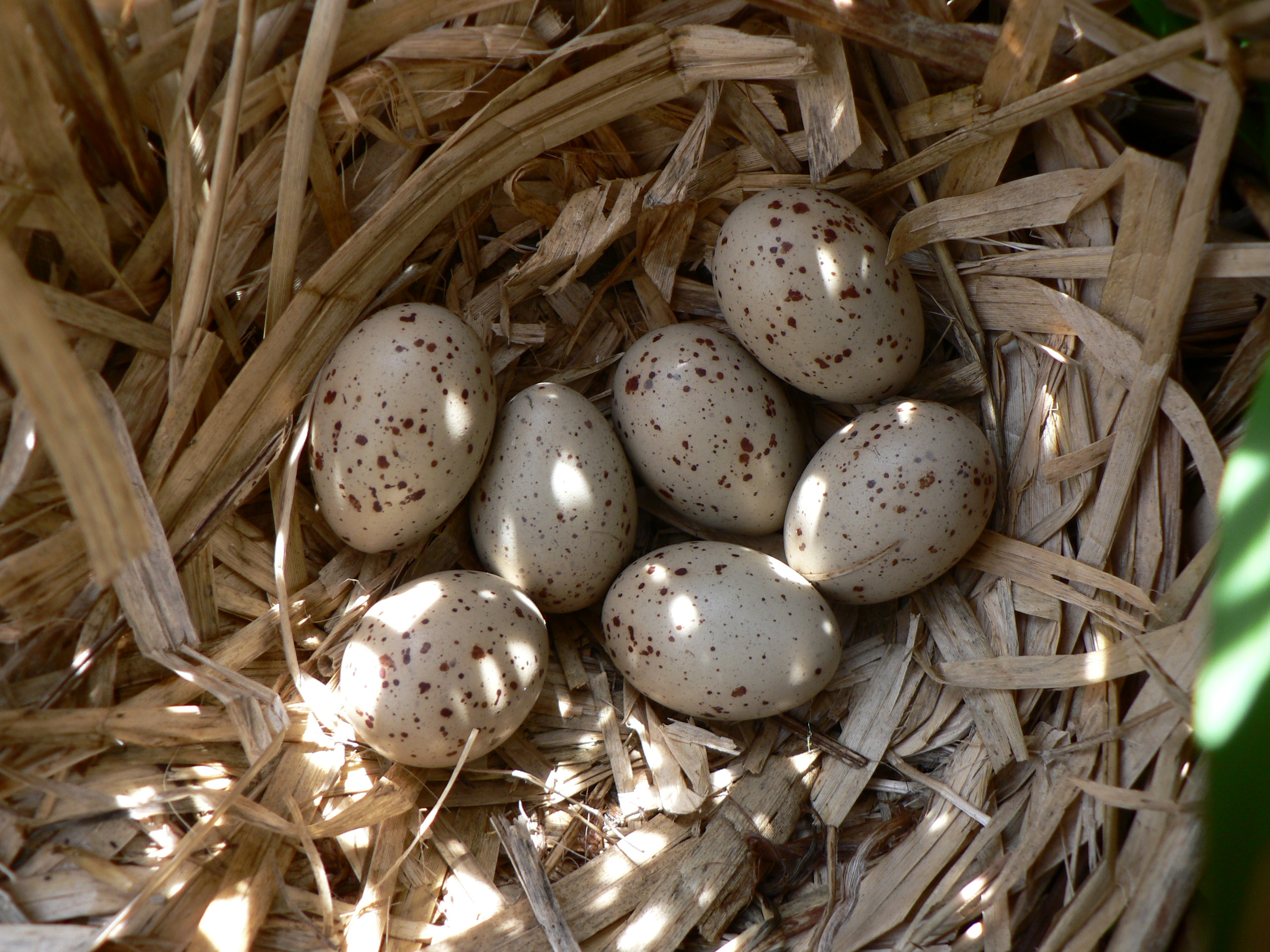
Common moorhen (Gallinula chloropus), small clutch

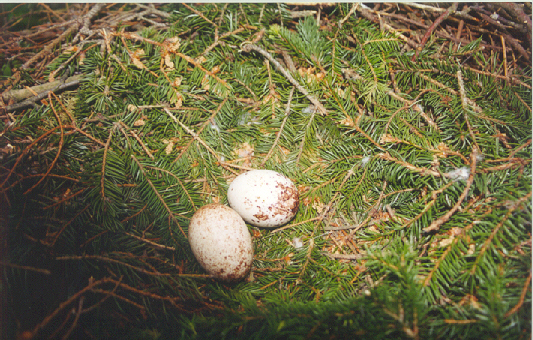
Lesser spotted eagle (Clanga pomarina), typical clutch

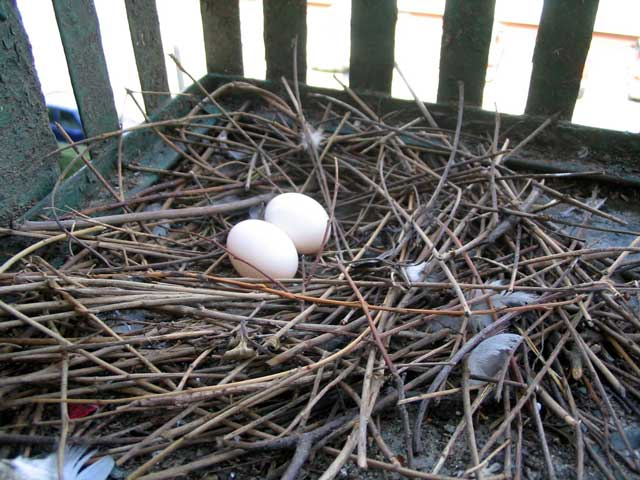
Feral pigeon (Columba livia), typical clutch

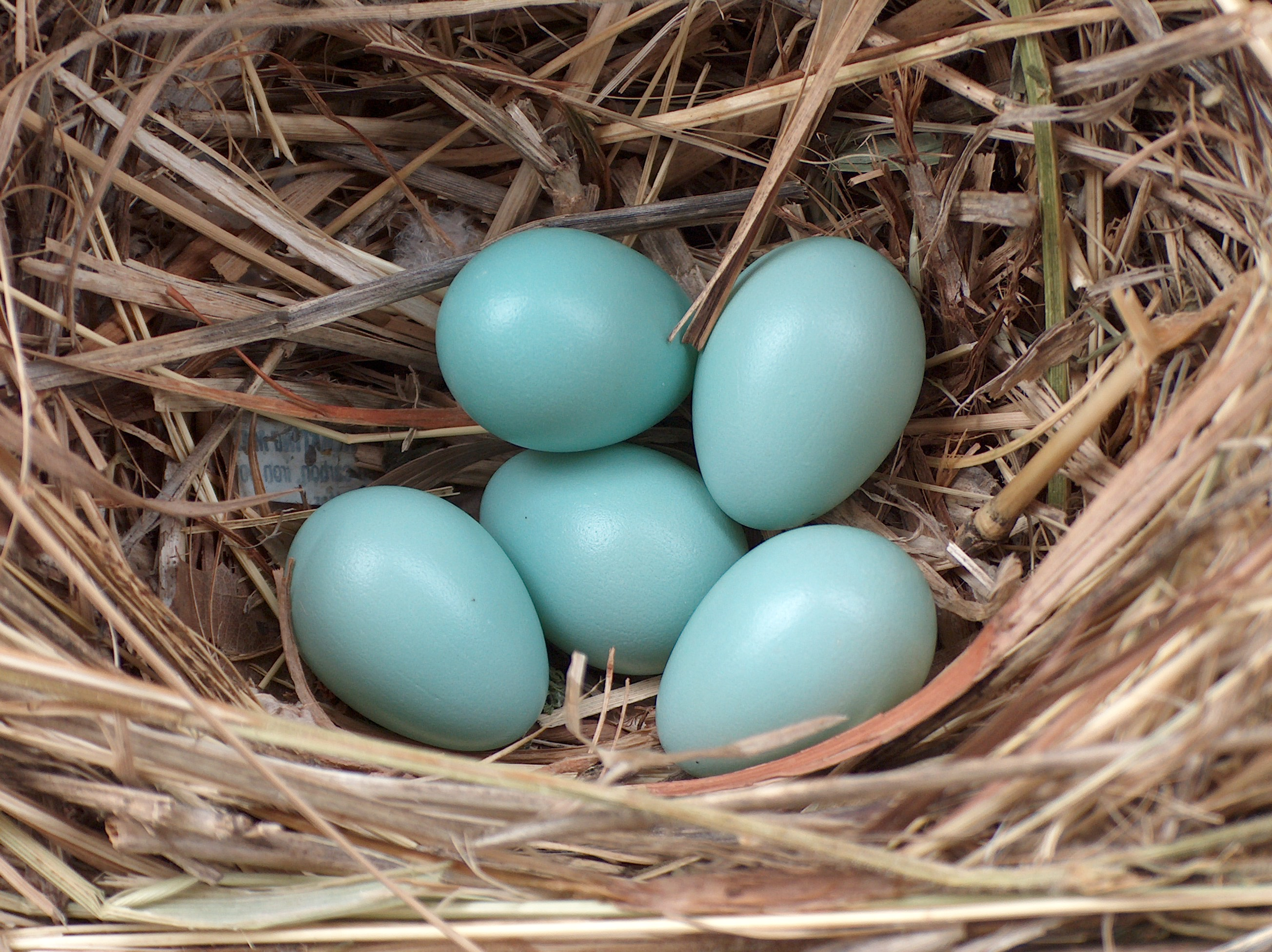
European starling (Sturnus vulgaris), typical clutch

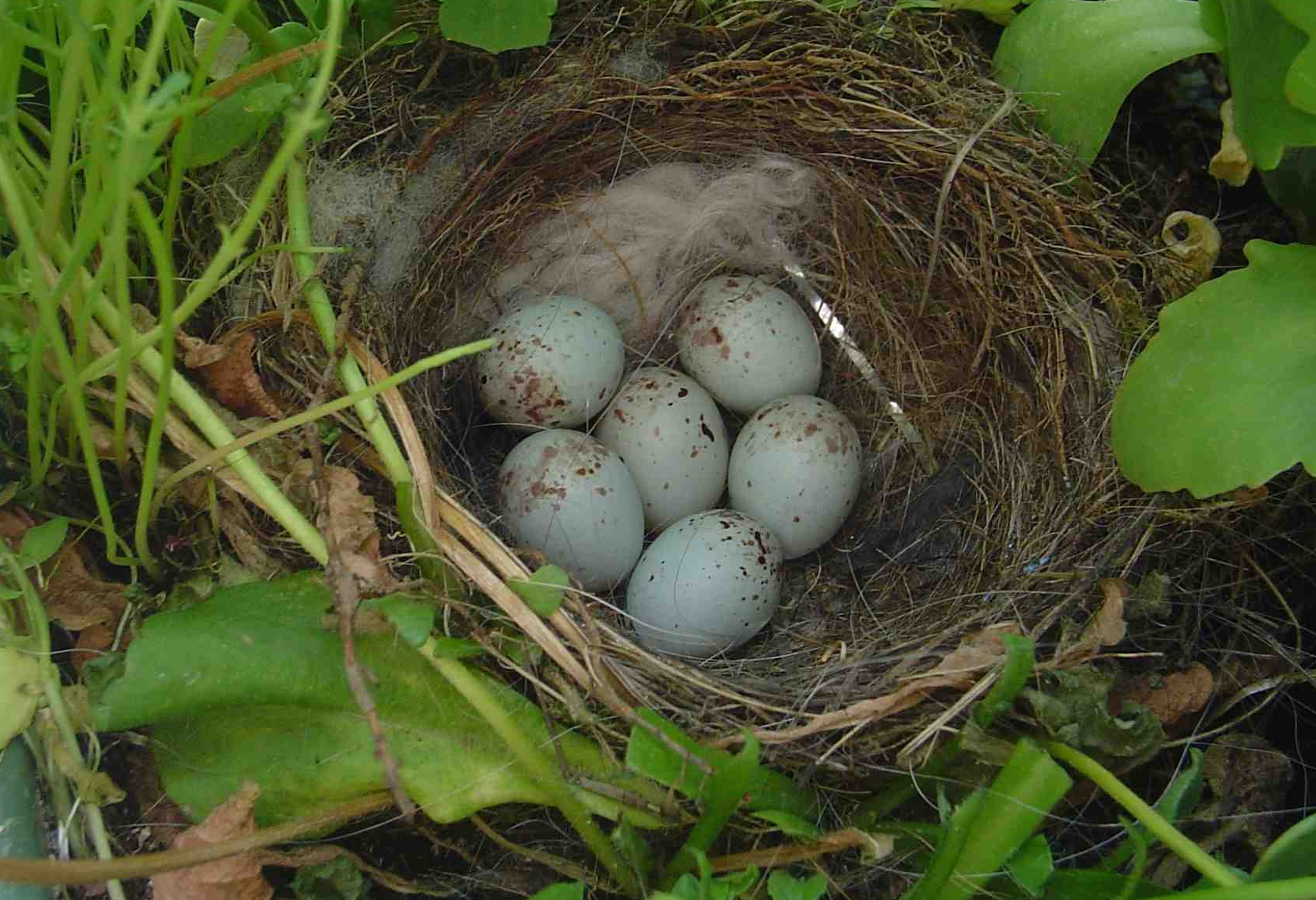
European goldfinch (Carduelis carduelis), large clutch

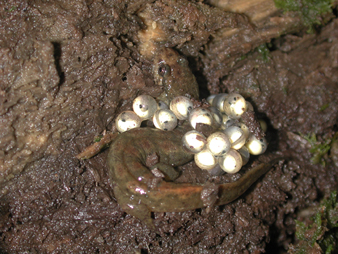
Northern dusky salamander (Desmognathus fuscus), typical egg clutches

== See also ==
- Litter (zoology) – Multiple animal offspring from one gestation
- Oology – Branch of ornithology studying bird eggs, nests and breeding behavior
- Viviparity – Development of the embryo inside the mother
