= Intragenomic and intrauterine conflict in humans =

Different perspectives on the cost of survival and future reproduction of the offspring

Intragenomic and intrauterine conflicts in humans arise between mothers and their offspring. Parental investment theory states that parents and their offspring will often be in conflict over the optimal amount of investment that the parent should provide. This is because the best interests of the parent do not always match the best interests of the offspring. Maternal-infant conflict is of interest due to the intensity of maternal investment in her offspring. In humans, mothers often invest years of care into their children due to the long developmental period before children become self-sufficient.

Parents and their children are typically engaged in a cooperative venture in which both benefit by the survival and future reproduction of the offspring. However, their interests cannot be identical because their genes are not identical. While both parent and offspring are 100% related to themselves, they share only 50% of their genes with each other, which means both parent and child will at times be in conflict with each other.

== Intrauterine conflict ==
Maternal-infant conflict begins during pregnancy, where the mother's body must maintain her own health while also providing for the developing fetus. Broadly, both the fetus and the mother have the same evolutionary interests in the fetus coming to term and resulting in a healthy birth. However, there may also be conflicts between the amount of nutrients the fetus prefers to receive and the amount the mother prefers to give. For example, there may be conflict between the mother and the fetus over who should control fetal growth, wherein the fetus would prefer optimal growth and the mother would prefer to control fetal growth relative to the level of resources she has available.

=== Role of the placenta ===
The placenta plays an important role in this conflict since it is the source of nutrient delivery from mother to fetus, and also receives signals from both mother and fetus. The placenta is believed to play a balancing role in the conflict between mother and fetus, and confers optimal fitness to the fetus given the developmental constraints of the mother's resource availability. For instance, Rutherford and Tardiff suggested that in marmosets with variable litter sizes, litters of triplets were associated with smaller shares of the placenta each, suggesting that the fetuses were able to increase placental efficiency, perhaps by manipulating placental structure and function to solicit additional maternal resources, in the face of competition between the fetuses for limited maternal resources. However, they also note that the infrequency of successful gestation and weaning of complete triplet litters suggests that even in the face of a fetal mechanism for efficiency, maternal mechanisms may otherwise constrain energetic investments, perhaps especially after birth.

A key discovery related to both intrauterine and intragenomic conflict is that the fetal genotype can influence maternal physiology. Fetal manipulation of the maternal endometrium allows the fetus to gain access to maternal arterial blood. Through this manipulation, the mother cannot restrict blood flow to the fetus without restricting blood flow to herself. When mothers are unable to defend against fetal alterations, development of pregnancy related syndromes such as gestational diabetes and pre-eclampsia occur. Gestational diabetes occurs when higher blood glucose leads to increased production of insulin in response to fetally-influenced resistance to insulin. Pre-eclampsia is high blood pressure that occurs during pregnancy which may be the result of fetal manipulations which increase blood flow.

== Genomic imprinting ==
Genomic imprinting refers to the different effects of the same gene depending on whether the gene was inherited from one's mother or father. While most genes do not have different effects based on their parental origin, a small subset do. These genes are referred to as imprinted. Imprinting arises when the effect of the gene's expression in the offspring is likely to have a strong effect on a parent's fitness. For example, genes which are implicated in the offspring's acquisition of resources from the mother are strongly beneficial to the father's fitness because his offspring who have genes which are highly successful at acquiring the mother's resources are likely to survive and reproduce. Furthermore, the father pays no direct cost of breastfeeding the infant whereas the mother does pay the cost. In this case, the father's copy of these genes should be selected to acquire more resources than the mother's copy of these genes. Currently, there are around 100 known imprinted genes in mice, and 50 in humans. Some imprinted genes appear to have no effect, or if the gene is clearly related to function the imprinted expression of the gene does not.

As with intrauterine conflict, genomic imprinting is believed to be highly related to placentation, because evidence of genomic imprinting is found only in placental mammals, leading to the hypothesis that genomic imprinting and placentation are evolutionarily linked. Imprinted gene expression is shown to be integral to normal development and functioning of the placenta. Furthermore, the web of signaling which is expressed between fetus, placenta, and maternal hypothalamus is likely the result of co-adaptations of gene expression related to fetal growth and brain development.

=== Disorders of imprinting ===
The discovery of the genomic imprinting phenomenon helped researchers to understand the basis for several disorders with otherwise unclear inheritance patterns including Prader-Willi/Angelman syndromes, Beckwith-Wiedemann syndrome, and Silver-Russell syndrome. Disorders of imprinting are thought to be related to abnormal DNA methylation, which may involve multiple imprinted loci. Evidence that assistive-reproductive technology and peri-conceptional environmental factors such as maternal diet are implicated in imprinting-related disorders draws a link between oocyte health and proper imprinting development.

==== Prader-Willi syndrome and Angelman syndrome ====
Prader-Willi and Angelman syndromes are genetic disorders which are caused when the only copy of an imprinted gene is the 'silent' copy and the active copy is absent, either due to a deletion or to uniparental disomy. Both are due to the absence of gene expression at 15q11–q13, wherein Prader-Willi is believed to reflect the absence of the paternally derived gene, and Angelman syndrome reflects the absence of the maternal copy.

In the case of Prader-Willi syndrome, the paternal copy is absent while the maternal 'silent' copy is present. Prader-Willi syndrome is characterized by low birth weight, hypersomnolence, low appetite and poor suckling. The child typically develops a voracious appetite around 1–2 years of age which typically leads to early onset obesity. Children with Prader-Willi syndrome typically have reduced height throughout childhood and absence of pubertal growth.

==== Kinship theory ====
A paradigm used to study genomic imprinting is kinship theory. Kinship theory argues that imprinting evolves due to conflicts between the interests of paternal and maternal genes within an infant, specifically in regards to infant use of maternal resources. Mothers can have children who have different fathers, therefore paternally-derived genes are expected to exploit maternal resources in favor of offspring growth, while maternally-derived genes are expected to constrain maternal resource allocation in order to spread resources over multiple offspring.

Through kinship theory, the occurrence of Prader-Willi syndrome is theorized to result from the absence of the paternally derived gene, and the only copy is the maternally 'silent' copy. In this case, the child is expected to express behaviors which reduced maternal costs in evolutionary history. In particular, a reduction of infant feeding responses and low appetite over the period of years when the child would near completely rely on breastmilk from its mother would allow mothers to allocate their resources across themselves and multiple offspring. Breastfeeding an infant is estimated to cost around an additional 500 kcals per day, if additional energy is not consumed during lactation, body stores are used making breastfeeding a costly maternal endeavor. Low appetite in early age is followed by a sudden onset of appetite and feeding behaviors around age 2. In traditional subsistence communities, this corresponds with the age that children would be weaned from breastmilk and offered supplementary solid foods. It is likely that these weaning foods were less directly costly to the mother than breastfeeding, either because gathering these food items were less energetically costly for her to gather, or she could rely on social partners to assist her in gathering the food. Therefore, Prader-Willi allows us to see the roles of normally invisible imprinting effects which arose in relation to ancestral parental provisioning conflicts. In typically developing individuals, the imprinted genes related to Prader-Willi and Angelman syndrome are balanced in a "tug-of-war" designed by natural selection. However, when one of these genes is missing the balance is disrupted and the effects result in the phenotypes seen in these disorders.

=== Menopause ===
Some authors have argued that variability in the timing of onset and the symptom expression of menopause may represent intragenomic conflict. Human female reproductive capacity ends around age 50, which is around two decades earlier than women's expected lifespans, including in communities without access to medical care. Many have questioned why menopause evolved, since women who did not experience menopause would be able to increase their fitness by extending their reproductive capacities and having more children. The Grandmother Hypothesis argues that menopause evolved because it is an adaptation which increases a woman's fitness through inclusive fitness, that is promoting her genes through her relatives such as her grandchildren. Selective forces related to the onset of menopause may be different between paternal and maternal interests. Ecological differences in female-biased dispersal patterns in ancestral environments may be related to current difference between populations as to the onset and symptomatology of menopause. If so, women whose ancestors evolved in populations with lower female bias in dispersal will be more likely to experience more severe symptoms and earlier menopause than women whose ancestors evolved in populations with higher female bias in dispersal.
