= Platyplectrum aganoposis =

Conservation status
- Least Concern (IUCN 3.1)

Scientific classification
- Kingdom: Animalia
- Phylum: Chordata
- Class: Amphibia
- Order: Anura
- Family: Limnodynastidae
- Genus: Platyplectrum
- Species: P. aganoposis

Binomial name
- Platyplectrum aganoposis (Zweifel, 1972)

Synonyms
- Lechriodus aganoposis Zweifel, 1972

Species of frog

Platyplectrum aganoposis, the Morobe cannibal frog, is a species of frog in the family Limnodynastidae. It is found in New Guinea. Its population is unknown, but studies show it is, while uncommon, not endangered, nor are there any threats to its future due to its stable nature currently and its potential tolerance to habitat degradation. It was classified in the former genus Lechriodus until its synonymization with Platyplectrum in 2021.

This species also can be found in the Huon Peninsula, along the central mountainous spine of New Guinea from Purosa (Eastern Highlands Province, Papua New Guinea) west to the Sibil Valley (Papua, Indonesia), and in Central Province (Mount Obree) and Milne Bay Province (Munimum) in southeast Papua New Guinea.

Its natural habitats are subtropical or tropical moist montane forests, intermittent freshwater marshes, and rural gardens. Their breeding grounds include ephemeral ponds.
