= Marsh frog (disambiguation) =

The marsh frog (Pelophylax ridibundus), a frog in the family Ranidae, is the largest frog native to Europe.

Marsh frog may also refer to:

- Barking marsh frog (Limnodynastes fletcheri), a frog in the family Myobatrachidae native to southeastern Australia
- Greek marsh frog (Pelophylax kurtmuelleri), a frog in the family Ranidae found in Greece, Albania, Montenegro, and Serbia
- Montane marsh frog (Poyntonia paludicola), a frog in the family Pyxicephalidae endemic to Western Cape, South Africa
- Persian marsh frog (Pelophylax persicus), a frog in the family Ranidae found in Iran, Afghanistan, Tajikistan and Turkmenistan
- Spotted marsh frog (Limnodynastes tasmaniensis), a frog in the family Myobatrachidae native to southeastern Australia including Tasmania
- Striped marsh frog (Limnodynastes peronii), a frog in the family Myobatrachidae native to coastal eastern Australia
- Western marsh frog (Heleioporus barycragus), a frog in the family Myobatrachidae endemic to Australia
