= Banjo frog =

Banjo frog may refer to:

== Frogs in the family Myobatrachidae ==
- Eastern banjo frog or Limnodynastes dumerilii, native to eastern Australia
- Giant banjo frog or Limnodynastes interioris, endemic to Australia
- Northern banjo frog or Limnodynastes terraereginae, native to eastern Queensland and northeastern New South Wales, Australia
- Western banjo frog or Limnodynastes dorsalis, endemic to Western Australia

== Other uses ==
- Banjo Frogs, a 1998 Australian clay animation film
