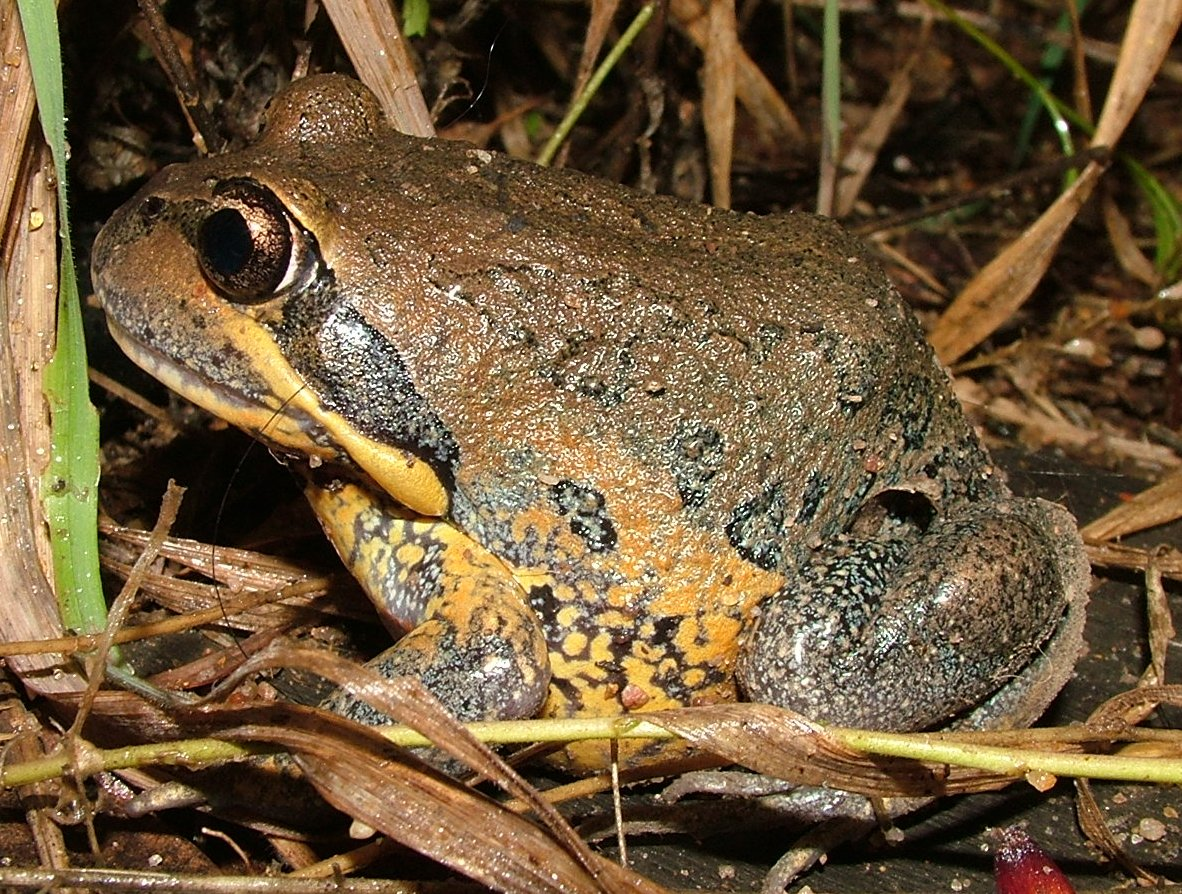

Conservation status
- Least Concern (IUCN 3.1)

Scientific classification
- Kingdom: Animalia
- Phylum: Chordata
- Class: Amphibia
- Order: Anura
- Family: Limnodynastidae
- Genus: Limnodynastes
- Species: L. grayi

Binomial name
- Limnodynastes grayi (Steindachner, 1867)

= Scarlet-sided banjo frog =

Species of amphibian

The scarlet-sided banjo frog (Limnodynastes grayi) is a species of ground-dwelling burrowing frogs native to eastern Queensland and northeastern New South Wales, Australia.

== Description ==
It is a moderately large species of frog reaching 78 mm in length. It is brown above with occasional darker flecks. There are red-orange or scarlet markings in the thigh and flanks, which gives this species its common name. There is a dark band which runs from the snout though the eye to above the forearm. This is underlined by a glandular cream to orange bar. The armpit is orange and the belly is white. The distinctive abrupt calls of this group give them the name banjo frogs or pobblebonks.

== Ecology and behaviour ==
It is a burrowing species and will spend time underground during dry periods. It is associated with dams, flooded areas and ditches in forest, woodland, cleared land or farmland. Males make a high pitched "bonk" call from concealed positions in water after heavy rains from October to May.

Eggs are laid in a large floating foamy mass. Tadpoles hatch about 2 to 3 days after laying. Tadpoles are very dark brown and reach 70 mm. Tadpole development takes about 70 days and metamorphs measure 20 mm and resemble the adult, however thigh colouration does not become apparent until about 1 week later.

== Similar species ==
It is similar to the eastern banjo frog, with which it overlaps in distribution. This species can be distinguished by calls and by the red thigh colouration. It is also similar to the superb banjo frog, which is larger and is restricted to Cape York Peninsula in far-northern Queensland. It can be distinguished from the coastal banjo frog, occurring in eastern coastal areas of New South Wales, by the smaller size of the latter species, which also lacks scarlet coloration in the thighs, flanks and groin.
