= Marsh snake =

There are two genera of snake named marsh snake:

- Hemiaspis, a monotypic genus wits sole representative, Hemiaspis signata
- Natriciteres
