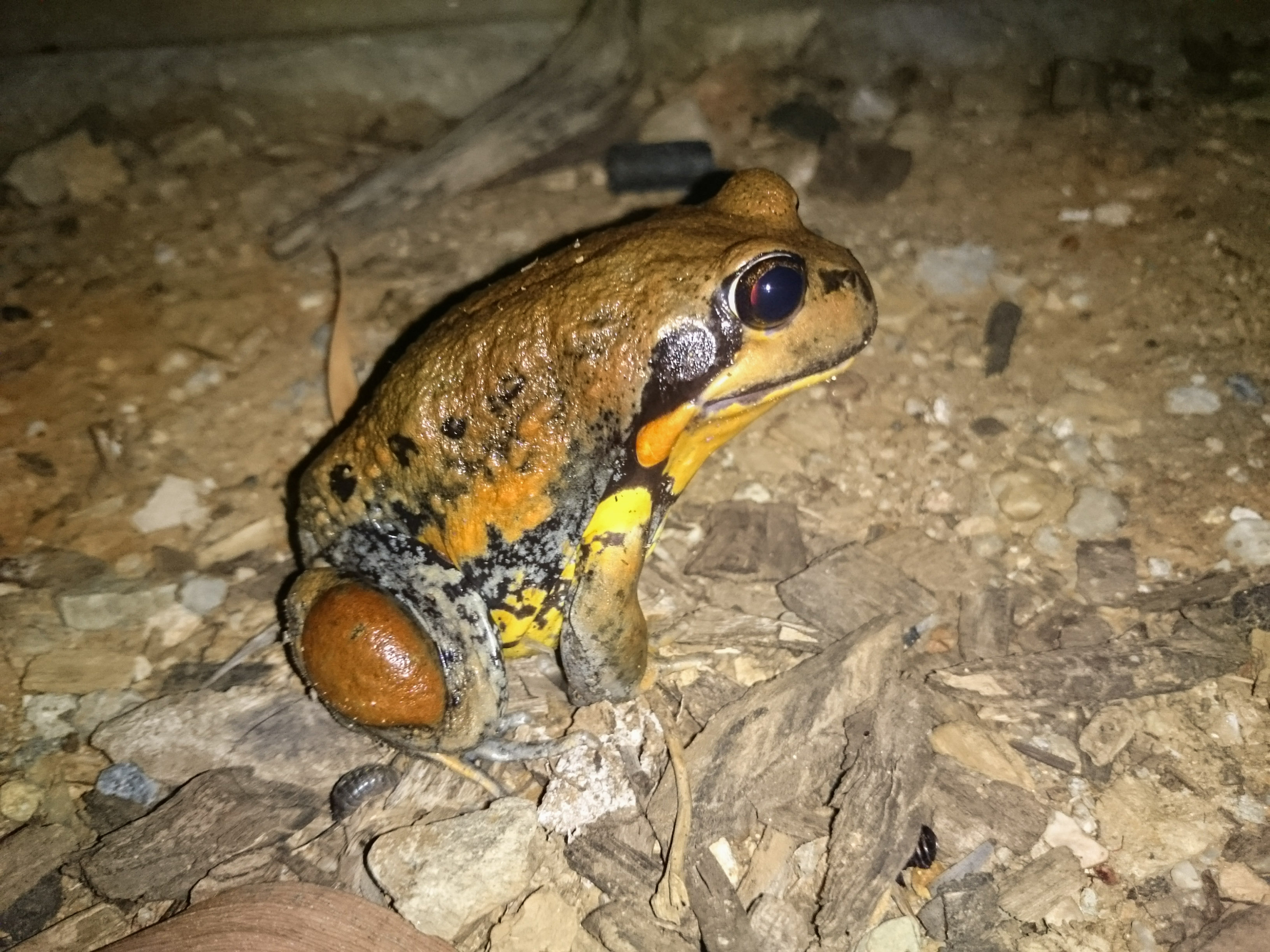
- Limnodynastes interioris

Scientific classification
- Kingdom: Animalia
- Phylum: Chordata
- Class: Amphibia
- Order: Anura
- Clade: Australobatrachia
- Superfamily: Myobatrachoidea; Schlegel, 1850

Families
- Limnodynastidae; Myobatrachidae

= Myobatrachoidea =

Myobatrachoidea Temporal range: Early Eocene to present

Superfamily of frogs

Myobatrachoidea is a superfamily of frogs. It contains two families, both of which are found in Australia, New Guinea, and the Aru Islands. Some sources group these two families into a single family Myobatrachidae.

Their closest relatives are thought to be the Calyptocephalellidae of southern South America, from which they diverged during the mid-Cretaceous (about 100 million years ago). Together, they comprise the clade Australobatrachia; their common ancestor is thought to have inhabited South America, with the ancestors of Myobatrachoidea dispersing to Australasia during the Cretaceous via (then ice-free) Antarctica. Both families within Myobatrachoidea are thought to have diverged from each other during the Late Cretaceous or during the earliest Paleocene (immediately after the Cretaceous-Paleogene extinction event). The earliest fossils of this group are of Platypectrum casca from the Early Eocene.

== Taxonomy ==
Myobatrachoidea contains the following families:

- Limnodynastidae Lynch, 1969 - 44 species
- Myobatrachidae Schlegel, 1850 - 91 species
