= Barking frog =

Barking frog may refer to:

- Craugastor augusti (barking frog or eastern barking frog), a frog in the family Craugastoridae found in Mexico and the southern United States
- Limnodynastes fletcheri (barking marsh frog), a frog in the family Myobatrachidae that is native to southeastern Australia
