= Eduard Dämel =

German entomologist

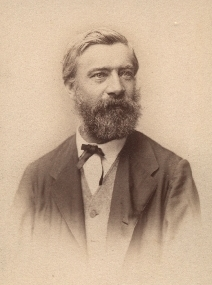
Eduard Dämel

Carl Friedrich Eduard Dämel also Damel, Daemel (1821–3 September 1900) was a German entomologist and natural history collector and dealer from Hamburg.

Dämel visited Australia three times, making natural history collections, many of which he later traded or sold. On his first trip, between 1852–1860 he mainly worked in the vicinity of Sydney but also visited Western Australia in 1859 and Port Curtis Gladstone, Queensland in 1860. Dämel made further collections in Queensland between 1865–1867 and 1871-1875, collecting insects and other natural history material (including botanical specimens) for his dealership and for the Museum Godeffroy in Hamburg. Dämel was the agent for Jacob Boll, a Swiss born entomologist who lived in Texas. Boll supplied insects from the southwestern United States and northwestern Mexico.

Dämel and another Hamburg entomologist working in Australia, Amalie Dietrich, collected the butterflies described by Georg Semper in 1879 in "Beitrag zur Rhopalocerenfauna von Australien ". (J. Mus. Godeffroy 14: 138–194 + Plates 8, 9). Dämel also supplied specimens from Queensland to Austrian Zoologist Franz Steindachner which augmented his description of herpetological collections made by the Austrian SMS Novara expedition in the vicinity of Sydney in 1858. These included the type specimen of Limnodynastes grayi (Steindachner 1867).

== Legacy ==
Dämel is commemorated in the scientific name of a species of Australian venomous snake, Hemiaspis damelii and the Australian frog, Papurana daemeli.

== Source ==
- Weidner, H. (1967). "Geschichte der Entomologie in Hamburg ". Abh. Verh. Naturwiss. Ver. Hamburg, N. F. 9 (Supplement): 5–387.
