= Opportunistic breeder =

Environmental mating strategy employed by various organisms

Flexible or opportunistic breeders mate whenever the conditions of their environment become favorable. Their ability and motivation to mate are primarily independent of day-length (photoperiod) and instead rely on cues from short-term changes in local conditions like rainfall, food abundance and temperature. Another factor is the presence of suitable breeding sites, which may only form with heavy rain or other environmental changes.

Thus, they are distinct from seasonal breeders that rely on changes in day length to induce entry into estrus and to cue mating, and continuous breeders like humans that can mate year-round. Other categories of breeders that perhaps can be subdivided under the heading "opportunistic" have been used to describe many species, such as many that are anurans like frogs. These include sporadic wet and sporadic dry, describing animals that breed sporadically not always under favorable conditions of rain or lack thereof.

Many opportunistic breeders are non-mammals. Those that are mammals tend to be small rodents.

Since changes in season can coincide with favorable changes in environment, the distinction between seasonal breeder and opportunistic can be muddled. In equatorial climes, the change in seasons is not always perceptible and thus, changes in day length not remarkable. Thus, the tree kangaroo (Dendrolagus) previously categorized as a seasonal breeder is now suspected to be an opportunistic breeder.

Additionally, opportunists can have qualities of seasonal breeders. The red crossbill exhibits a preference (not a requirement) for long-day seasonality, but requires other factors, especially food abundance and social interactions, in order to breed. Conversely, food availability by itself incompletely promotes reproductive development.

== Physiology ==
Opportunistic breeders are typically capable of breeding at any time or becoming fertile within a short period of time. An example is the golden spiny mouse where changes in dietary salt in its desert habitat due to rainfall appear to cue reproductive function. Increased levels of salinity in drying vegetation cause females to experience a reproductive hiatus.

While reproduction is generally independent of photoperiod, animals can still experience reduced fertility with changes in day-length.

== Partial list of opportunistic breeders ==
=== Mammals ===
- Golden spiny mouse
- Red kangaroo
- Tree kangaroo
- Musk shrew
- Cape spiny mouse

=== Birds ===
- Zebra finch
- Crossbill
- Budgerigar
- Princess parrot
- Blue-footed booby

=== Amphibians ===
Frogs and toads including:

- Long-thumbed frog
- Southern spadefoot toad (Scaphiopus)
- African clawed frog
- Fowler's toad

== See also ==
- opportunistic feeder
- opportunistic infection
