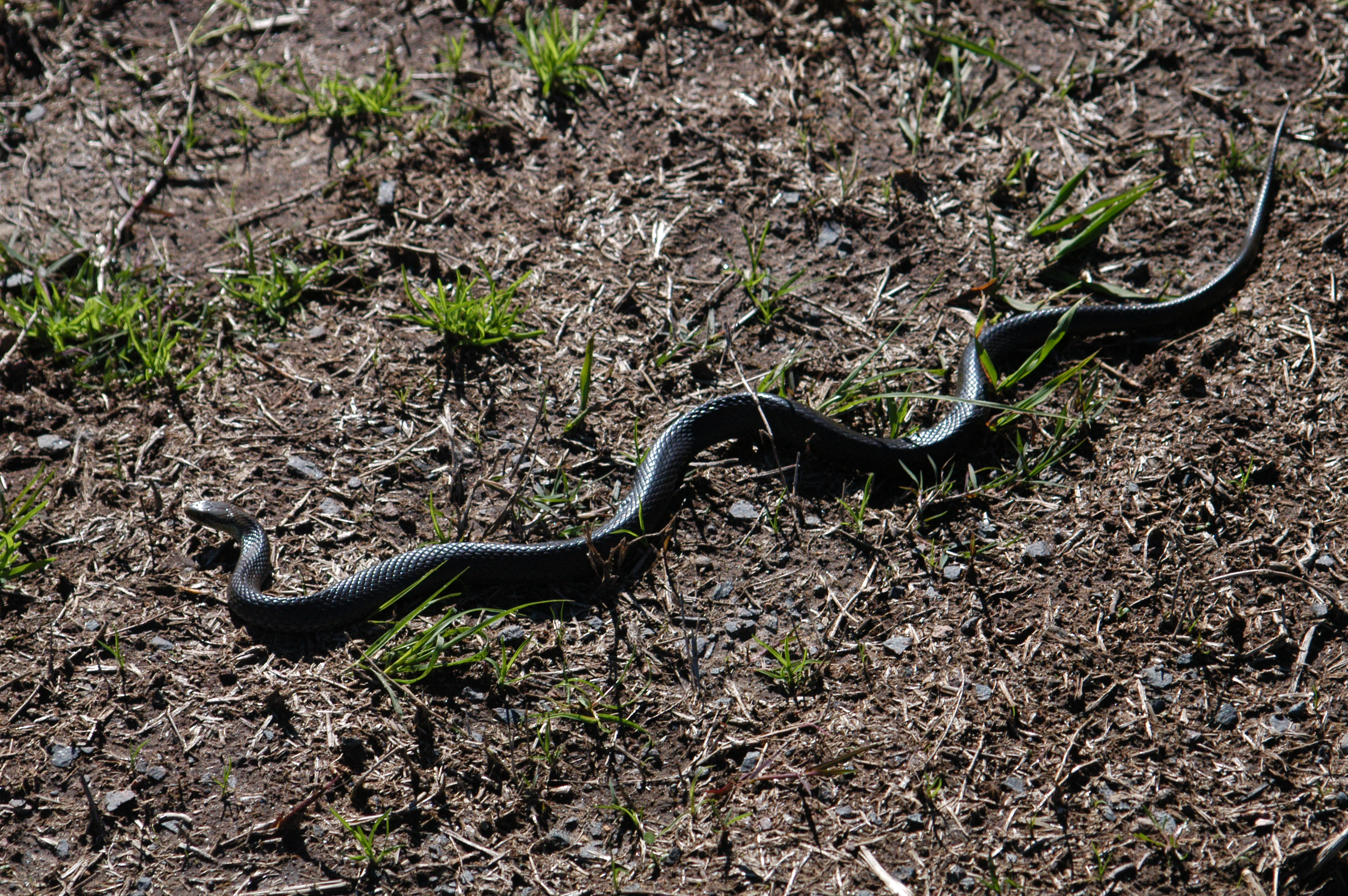

Conservation status
- Least Concern (IUCN 3.1)

Scientific classification
- Kingdom: Animalia
- Phylum: Chordata
- Class: Reptilia
- Order: Squamata
- Suborder: Serpentes
- Family: Elapidae
- Genus: Hemiaspis
- Species: H. signata

Binomial name
- Hemiaspis signata (Jan, 1859)

Synonyms
- Alecto signata Jan, 1859; Denisonia signata — Boulenger, 1896; Drepanodontis signata — Rankin, 1972; Hemiaspis signata — Cogger, 1983

= Hemiaspis signata =

Species of snake

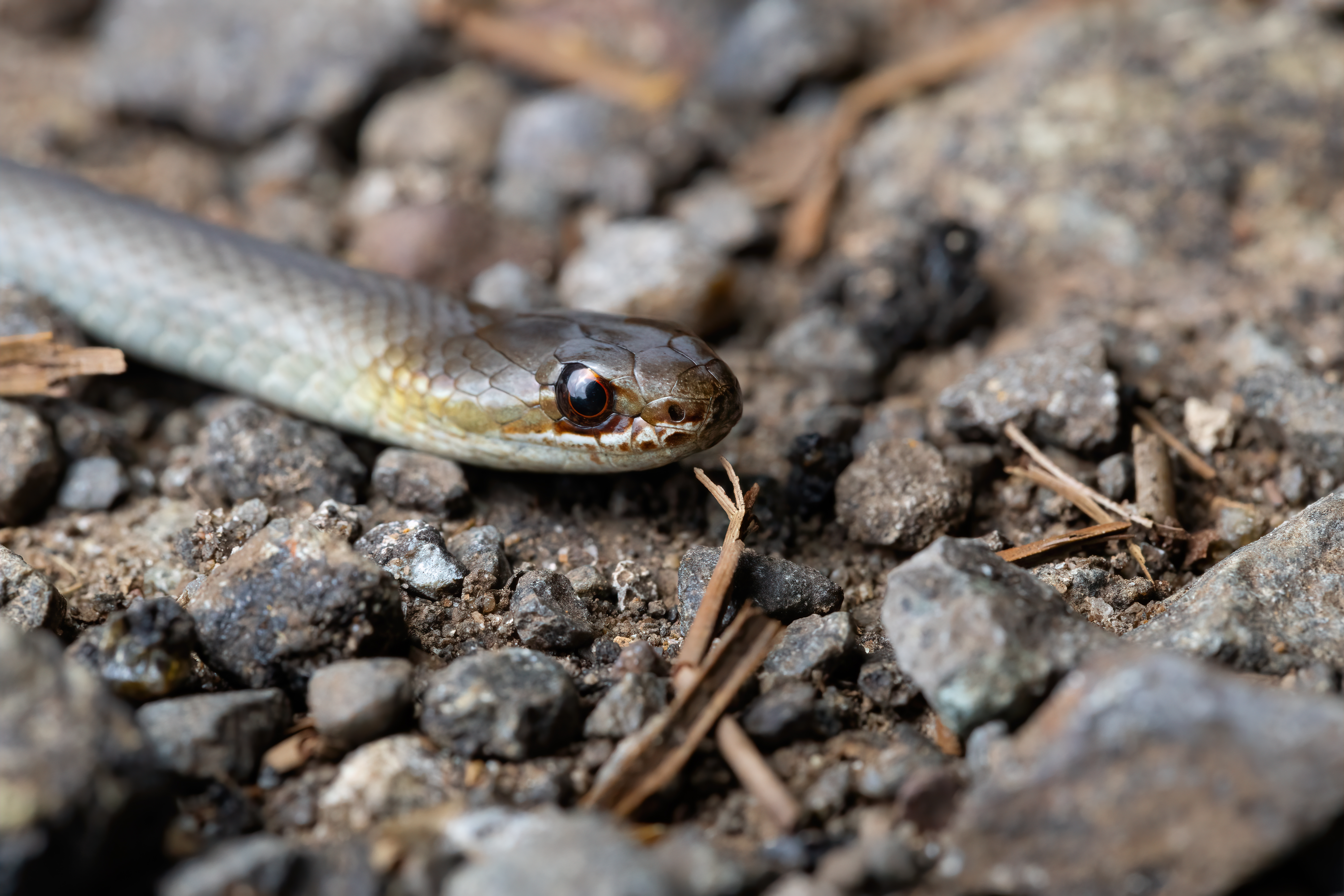

Hemiaspis signata (common names: black-bellied swamp snake and marsh snake) is a species of venomous elapid snake endemic to Australia, where it is found along the east coast.

Recognisable by two distinctive narrow white lines on the face, the colour can range from pale olive to black top with a dark grey to black belly. Adults can grow to 70 cm in length, but most specimens are smaller than this. Their diet consists mainly of skinks and frogs.

It was first described in 1859 by Giorgio Jan as Alecto signata.
