= Continuous breeder =

Animal that can breed throughout the year

Continuous breeders are animal species that can breed or mate throughout the year. This includes humans and apes (bonobos, chimpanzees, gorillas, orangutans, and gibbons), who can have a child at any time of year. In continuous breeders, females are sexually receptive during estrus, at which time ovarian follicles are maturing and ovulation can occur. Evidence of ovulation, the phase during which conception is most probable, is advertised to males among many non-human primates via swelling and redness of the genitalia.

== See also ==
- Opportunistic breeder
- Seasonal breeder
