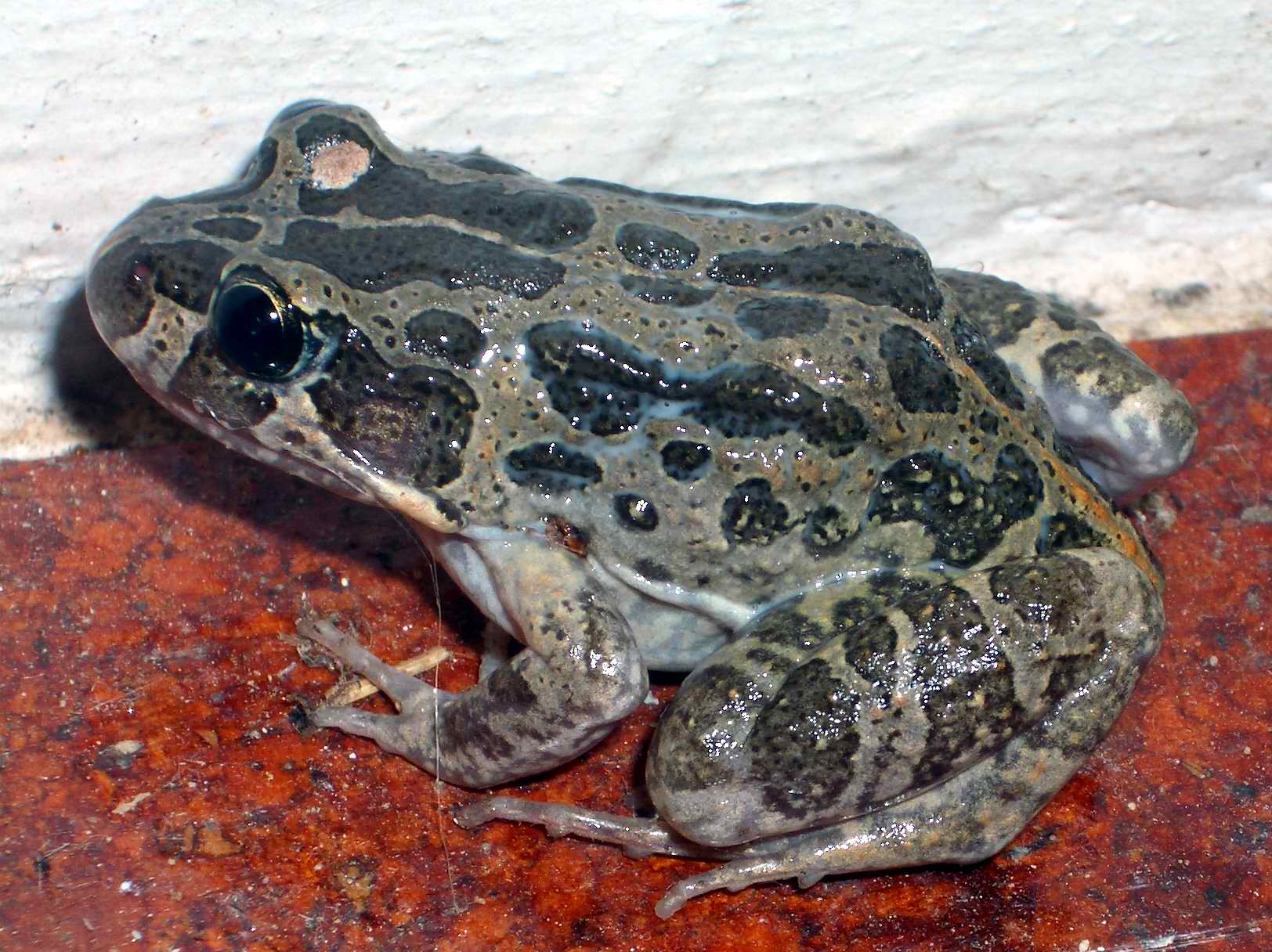

Conservation status
- Least Concern (IUCN 3.1)

Scientific classification
- Kingdom: Animalia
- Phylum: Chordata
- Class: Amphibia
- Order: Anura
- Family: Limnodynastidae
- Genus: Limnodynastes
- Species: L. convexiusculus

Binomial name
- Limnodynastes convexiusculus (Macleay, 1878)

Synonyms
- Ranaster convexiusculus Macleay, 1878; Limnodynastes olivaceus De Vis, 1884; Phanerotis novae-guineae Van Kampen, 1909; Ranaster olivaceus (De Vis, 1884)

= Marbled frog =

Species of amphibian

The marbled frog or marbled marsh frog (Limnodynastes convexiusculus) is a species of ground-dwelling frog native to northern and north-eastern Australia, and southern New Guinea in both Indonesia and Papua New Guinea.

It should not be confused with the spotted grass frog (Limnodynastes tasmaniensis), which was also formerly known as the "marbled frog" in South Australia.

== Description ==
Adult marbled frogs reach about 4.5 centimetres (1.8 in) in length, sometimes larger. Toes are long and unwebbed. Grey to light brown on back with numerous prominent darker blotches. The belly is white. Males have a yellowish throat and numerous small sharp black spines on their backs. When disturbed their skin excretes large amounts of mucus.

== Ecology and behaviour ==
The marbled frog tends to be solitary inhabiting thick ground vegetation and is more often heard than seen. Males often call from hidden sites, usually partly submerged beneath vegetation. Its call has been described as "a rapid series of uk uk uks". Eggs are laid in a floating foam nest under vegetation and are small and brown. Tadpoles reach 7 centimetres (2.8 in) in length.

The marbled frog inhabits waterholes and pools in open grassland and woodland.
