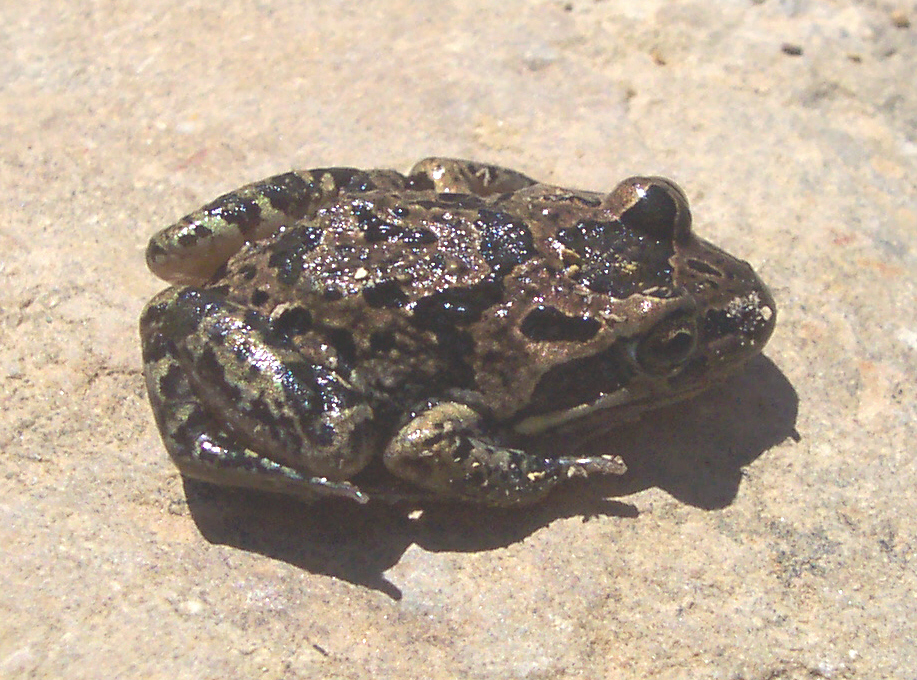

Conservation status
- Least Concern (IUCN 3.1)

Scientific classification
- Kingdom: Animalia
- Phylum: Chordata
- Class: Amphibia
- Order: Anura
- Family: Limnodynastidae
- Genus: Limnodynastes
- Species: L. fletcheri

Binomial name
- Limnodynastes fletcheri Boulenger, 1888

Synonyms
- List: Limnodynastes marmoratus (Lamb, 1911); Opisthodon fletcheri (Wells & Wellington, 1985); Opisthodon lambi (Wells & Wellington, 1985)

= Long-thumbed frog =

Species of amphibian

The long-thumbed frog, Fletcher's frog or barking marsh frog (Limnodynastes fletcheri) is a species of non-burrowing ground frog native to south-eastern Australia. The species belongs to the genus Limnodynastes. The twelve species in the genus are characterised by a lack of toe pads. Following phylogenetic analysis, the species was placed in L. peronii clade group alongside L. depressus, L. tasmaniensis and L. peronii.

== Description ==
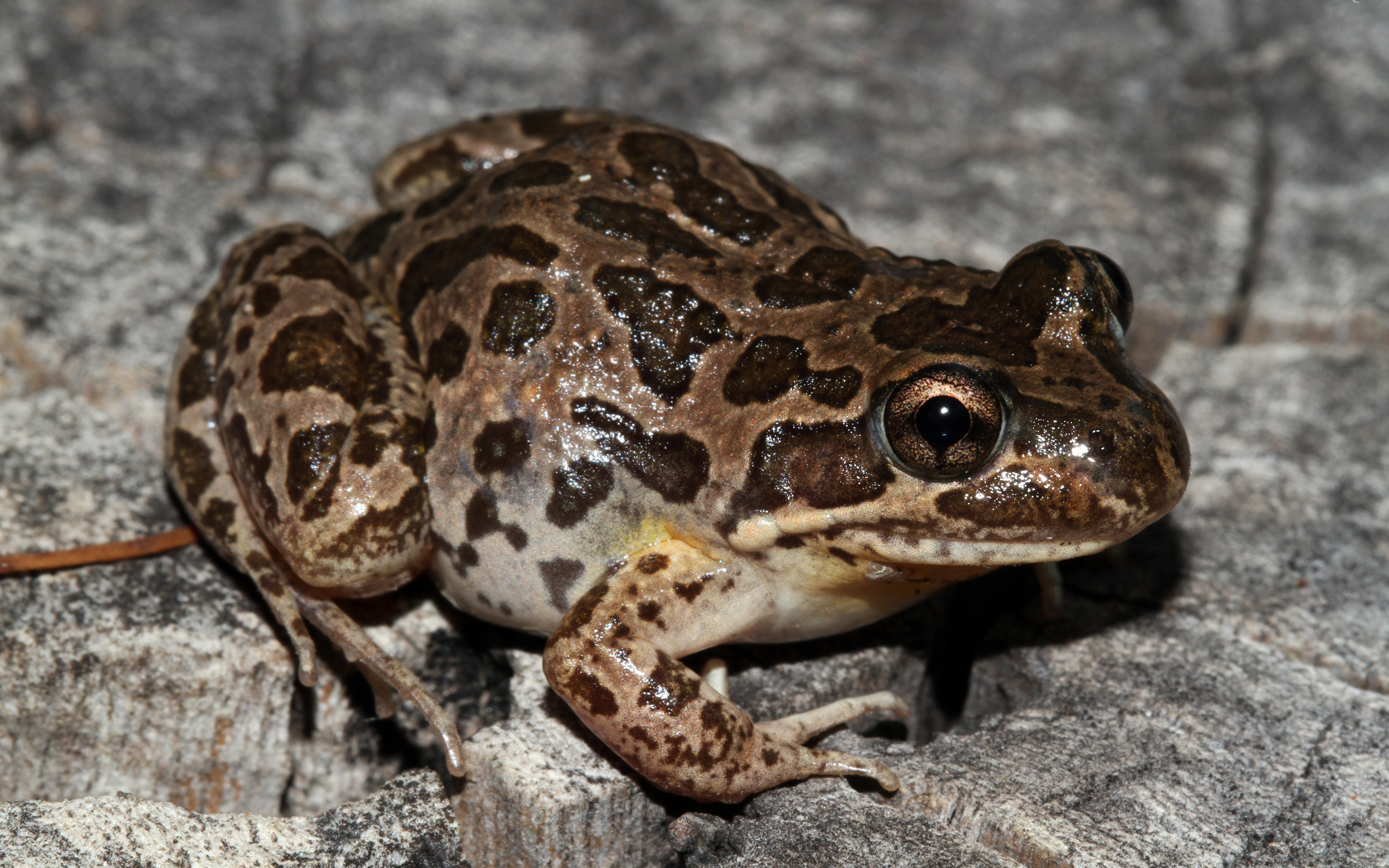
A demonstration of the butterfly-shaped blotch between the long-thumbed frog's eyes

The long-thumbed frog is a medium-sized frog reaching about 50 mm (2.0 in) in length. It is grey or brown with abnormal shaped darker patches or irregular spots, and in most individuals a butterfly-shaped patch between the eyes. There is normally a red or purplish patch above the eye. It is similar in many respects to L. tasmaniensis from which it can be most reliably distinguished by its call. The belly is white. The tympanum is indistinct.

== Distribution and habitat ==
This species inhabits drier areas west of the ranges of New South Wales as well as southern Queensland, northern Victoria and eastern South Australia. It is associated with rivers, dams and creeks (often temporary) in woodland and grassland. During drier conditions they shelter under rocks, in cracked mud and yabby burrows.

== Behaviour and ecology ==
Males make a dog-like "rok" or "whrup" call from grassy areas around the edge of water bodies, after rain or when water levels are high, during spring to autumn. Breeding occurs mostly after heavy rain and eggs are laid in a floating foamy mass, often attached to vegetation. Eggs and tadpoles are generally found in slow moving or still waters Tadpoles can reach up to 69 mm (2.7 in) and as an opportunistic breeder metamorphosis can occur at any time of the year. The tadpoles are very similar to Limnodynastes tasmaniensis and cannot be readily distinguished until metamorphosis.

== As a pet ==
In Australia, this species may be kept in captivity with a license.

== Conservation ==
Although the species population is considered 'Least Concern' under the IUCN Red List and stable, L. fletcheri threatened by habitat loss. The species is also becoming increasingly threatened by altered flow regimes across Australia's rivers. There is a positive relationship between flooding frequency and the breeding activity for L. fletcheri Flooding between September and December is required to maximise breeding responses from the species, this will increase the likelihood of species persistence and diversity. Therefore, the species may be negatively affected by regulatory activities such as damming and would respond positively to environmental flow management
