= Seasonal breeder =

Animal species that successfully mate during certain times of year

Seasonal breeders are animal species that successfully mate only during certain times of the year. These times of year allow for the optimization of survival of young due to factors such as ambient temperature, food and water availability, and changes in the predation behaviors of other species. Related sexual interest and behaviors are expressed and accepted only during this period. Female seasonal breeders will have one or more estrus cycles only when she is "in season" or fertile and receptive to mating. At other times of the year, they will be anestrus, or have a dearth of their sexual cycle. Unlike reproductive cyclicity, seasonality is described in both males and females. Male seasonal breeders may exhibit changes in testosterone levels, testes weight, and fertility depending on the time of year.

Seasonal breeders are distinct from opportunistic breeders, that mate whenever the conditions of their environment become favorable, and continuous breeders that mate year-round.

== Timing of seasonal breeding ==
The breeding season is when seasonal breeders reproduce. Various variables can affect when it occurs. A primary influence on the timing of reproduction is food availability. Organisms generally time especially stressing events of reproduction to occur in sync with increases in food availability. This is not always true, however, both because of the importance of other factors and the invalidation of this generalization. For example, in species reproducing at high latitudes, food availability before breeding is more important than availability during reproduction itself. Other factors can also be responsible. For example, species that are preyed upon frequently may time reproduction to occur out of sync with the peak in density of predators.

== Physiology ==
The hypothalamus is considered to be the central control for reproduction due to its role in hormone regulation. Hence, factors that determine when a seasonal breeder will be ready for mating affect this tissue. This is achieved specifically through changes in the production of the hormone GnRH. GnRH in turn transits to the pituitary where it promotes the secretion of the gonadotropins LH and FSH, both pituitary hormones critical for reproductive function and behavior, into the bloodstream. Changes in gonadotropin secretion initiate the end of anestrus in females.

=== Day length ===
Seasonal breeding readiness is strongly regulated by length of day (photoperiod) and thus season. Photoperiod likely affects the seasonal breeder through changes in melatonin secretion by the pineal gland that ultimately alter GnRH release by the hypothalamus.

Hence, seasonal breeders can be divided into groups based on fertility period. "Long day" breeders cycle when days get longer (spring) and are in anestrus in fall and winter. Some animals that are long day breeders include ring-tailed lemurs, horses, hamsters, groundhogs, and mink. "Short day" breeders cycle when the length of daylight shortens (fall) and are in anestrus in spring and summer. The decreased light during the fall decreases the firing of the retinal nerves, in turn decreasing the excitation of the superior cervical ganglion, which then decreases the inhibition of the pineal gland, finally resulting in an increase in melatonin. This increase in melatonin results in an increase in GnRH and subsequently an increase in the hormones LH and FSH, which stimulate cyclicity.

== See also ==
- Musth – Condition in male elephants
- Rut (mammalian reproduction) – Mating season of ruminant mammals
