= Hemiaspis damelii =

Conservation status
- Endangered (IUCN 3.1)

Scientific classification
- Kingdom: Animalia
- Phylum: Chordata
- Class: Reptilia
- Order: Squamata
- Suborder: Serpentes
- Family: Elapidae
- Genus: Hemiaspis
- Species: H. damelii

Binomial name
- Hemiaspis damelii (Günther, 1876)

Synonyms
- Hoplocephalus damelii Günther, 1876; Denisonia dæmelii — Boulenger, 1896; Drepanodontis daemelii — Worrell, 1961; Hemiaspis damelii — Cogger, 1983

Species of snake

Hemiaspis damelii is a species of venomous snake in the family Elapidae. It is a relatively small species of elapid with a mean snout-vent length (SVL) of 42.6 to 60 cm (16.8 to 23.6 in). The species is endemic to eastern Australia and is most commonly found across central inland New South Wales through to the interior of south-eastern Queensland. Common names for this species include ngabi, grey snake and Dämel's Snake. The specific name, damelii, is in honor of German entomologist Edward Dämel, who collected Australian specimens for Museum Godeffroy.

== Description ==
H. damelii is a relatively small snake with an average snout-to-vent length (SVL) of 50 centimetres (20 inches). Minor size differences occur between sexes, with the males averaging a slightly larger size than females. It is olive to grey dorsally, and white to yellowish white ventrally, often flecked with dark grey. In some grey snakes, each scale may be tipped with black anteriorly, particularly on the flanks.

It has smooth dorsal scales which are in 17 rows at mid-body, 140-170 ventral scales, and 35-50 subcaudals which are single (undivided). This species also has a paired (divided) anal scale. Juvenile grey snakes have a distinctive black head which fades or sometimes completely disappears as the snake matures, occurring from the top of the head to the second scale row behind the parietals.

== Distribution and habitat ==
The distribution and ecology of H. damelii is poorly known. Existing records of the grey snake are most commonly found in south-eastern Queensland and north-central New South Wales, however small populations have also been found to occur in north-eastern South Australia and south-western New South Wales. It tends to favour dry sclerophyll forests and woodlands on clay soils where water bodies or gullies are present. It shelters under rocks, logs and other debris, as well as in cracks in soil.

== Reproduction and life cycle ==
The breeding period for H. damelii occurs from January to March. During Spring (September-October) adult females' ovarian follicles increase in size following ovulation in preparation of the breeding season. H. damelii has a relatively high fecundity, partly due to its large maternal snout-vent length (SVL), which has been found to significantly correlate with litter size. Litter size can range from 4-16 live young which are born fully formed (viviparous). The newborns take an average of 12 months to mature after birth.

== Diet ==
The diet of H. damelii consists predominately of terrestrial anurans. It has also been found to consume some scincid lizards, however this is quite rare.

== Behaviour ==
H. damelii is active during the night, beginning to move around sunset and remaining active for 1-2 hours after, using this time to hunt and feed.

== Venom and symptoms ==
The venom of H. damelii is fairly mild and is unlikely to cause fatalities in humans; however, a bite from a larger specimen may be very painful. The venom contains procoagulants and causes local pain and swelling.

== Conservation status and threats ==
In Queensland, H. damelii is listed as an endangered species under the Nature Conservation Act, 1992. It is also listed as endangered on the IUCN Red List of Threatened Species due to population decline. The key processes threatening H. damelii include the impacts of feral animals such as cats and foxes via predation, cane toads through ingestion and feral pigs through habitat destruction and competition for food resources. Increasing pasture improvement and cultivation are also destroying habitat through the disruption of soil structure in cracking clay soils. Changes to waterways and the hydrological cycle are also impacting grey snakes which rely on these floodplains and water sources.

Recent floods in NSW have helped researchers find 30 individual snakes. The venomous snake has only been seen a handful of times in the past 65 years.
