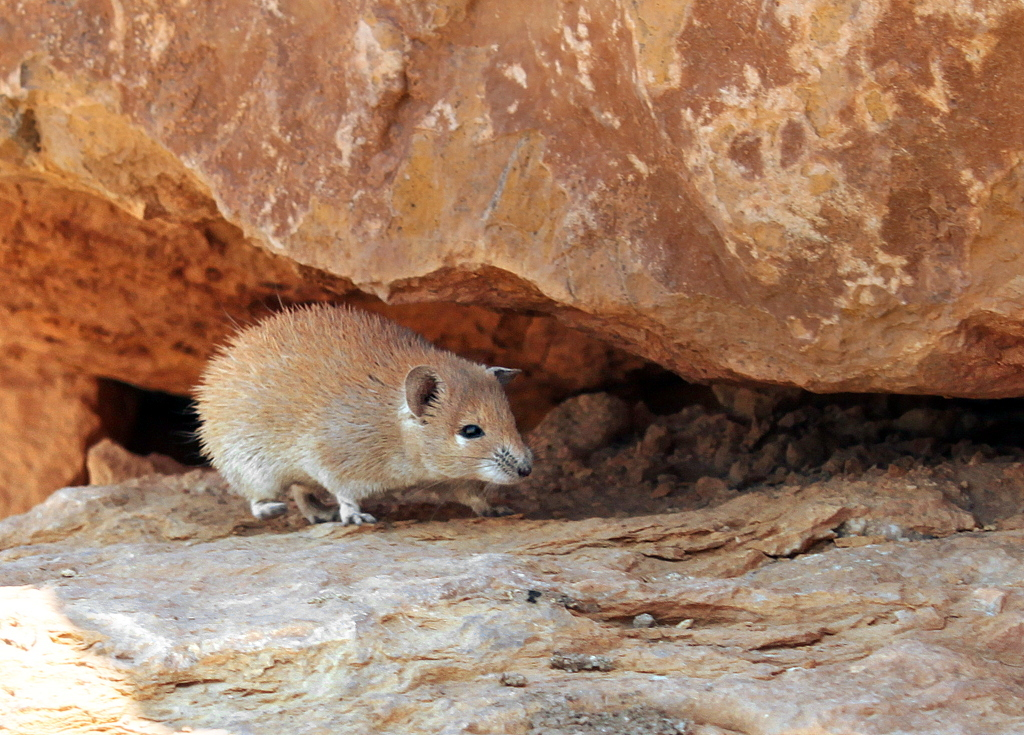

Conservation status
- Least Concern (IUCN 3.1)

Scientific classification
- Kingdom: Animalia
- Phylum: Chordata
- Class: Mammalia
- Order: Rodentia
- Family: Muridae
- Genus: Acomys
- Species: A. russatus

Binomial name
- Acomys russatus (Wagner, 1840)

Synonyms
- Acomys lewisi

= Golden spiny mouse =

Species of rodent

The golden spiny mouse (Acomys russatus) gets its name from the reddish-orange spiny fur that covers its body from head to tail. This coarse, inflexible fur is thought to protect it from predation. Aside from the golden fur that covers its head and upper parts, its flanks are yellow and its underside is pale. It has gray legs with pale feet and black soles. It is also described as having a small, but distinct white spot under each eye. It is often found in the wild missing a part or all of its tail because it is able to shed this as a defense mechanism. However, it is not known how this is done, how often it can occur, or under what conditions. It lives an average of three years in the wild. It is omnivorous and feeds on seeds, desert plants, snails, and insects. Living in desert regions, it is a xeric animal that obtains water from the plants that it eats and produces very concentrated urine in order to conserve water. A. russatus is naturally nocturnal, but adapts to being diurnal when it shares a habitat with A. cahirinus.

== Environment ==
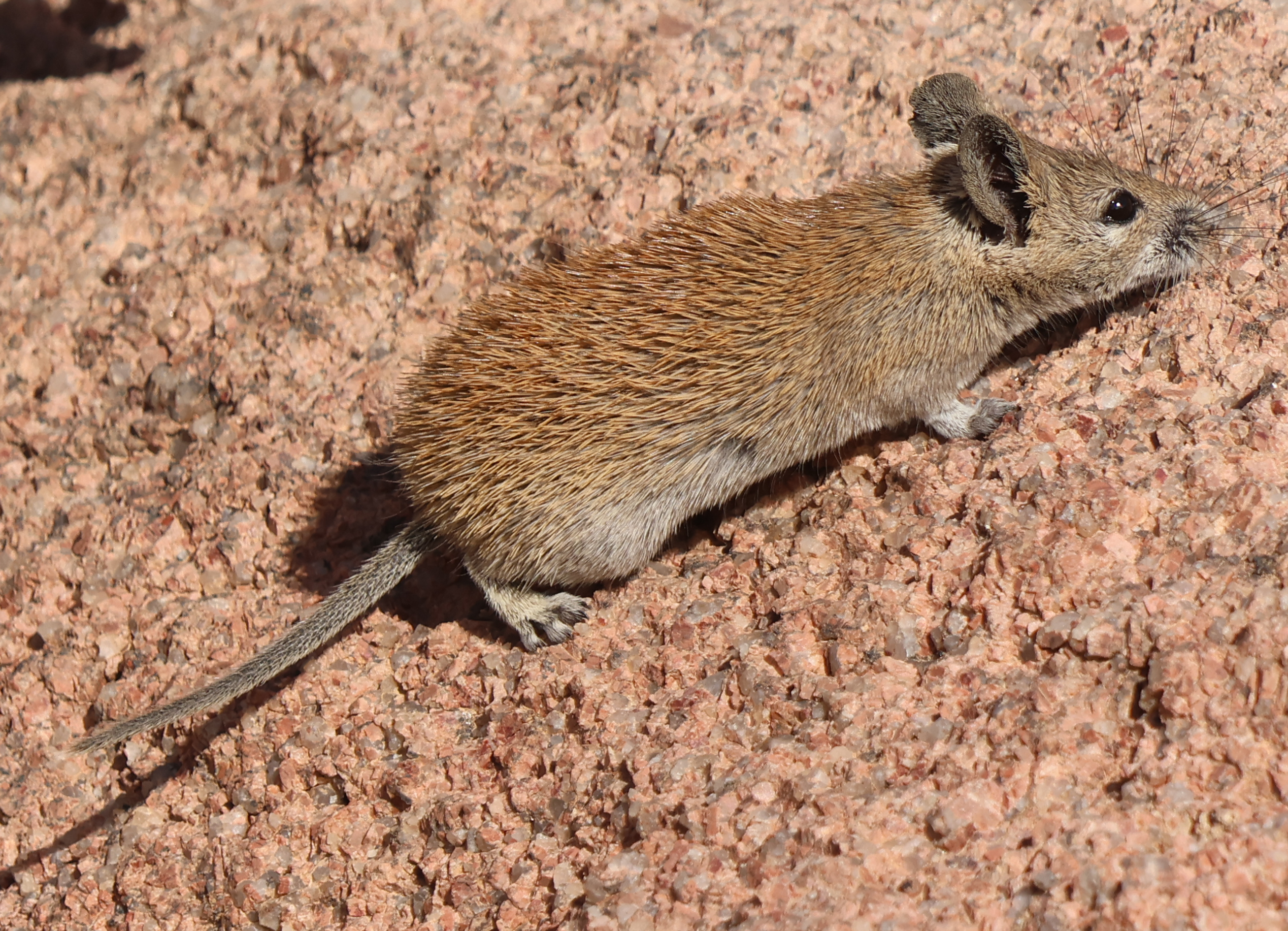
Golden Spiny Mouse from Eastern Saudi Arabia

The golden spiny mouse thrives in dry, hot deserts and is common in Egypt and much of the Middle East, including Jordan, Israel, Oman, Saudi Arabia, and Yemen. It is limited to these areas because its metabolic rate is much slower than predicted for an animal of its size, so it is unable to maintain a viable body temperature in colder environments where the temperature falls below 18 °C and can live in temperatures as high as 42.5 °C. A. russatus does not have a thermal neutral zone, but shows lowest oxygen consumption at 30 °C. However, one population was found in the high summits of the mountains in southern Sinai where the temperature falls well below this threshold and there is often snow in the winter.
A. russatus is also very good at conserving the little water it gets from its diet of insects and plants. It does this by producing extremely concentrated urine with urea content up to 4800 mM and chloride concentration up to 1500 mM. This means that it could survive drinking sea water, which is very rare in mammals.

== Reproduction ==
Acomys russatus is an opportunistic breeder that reaches sexual maturity at approximately 58 days of age. There is no mating season for spiny mice, but rather they continue to breed throughout the year. Each female has an average of 3.5 litters per year with about 34 days between litters. They are viviparous and each gestation period lasts 5–6 weeks and produces 1–5 offspring. Weaning of each litter takes two weeks. When rainfall decreases, the salt concentration in their food sources increases, which negatively impacts reproduction in both males and females.

== Flexible circadian rhythm ==
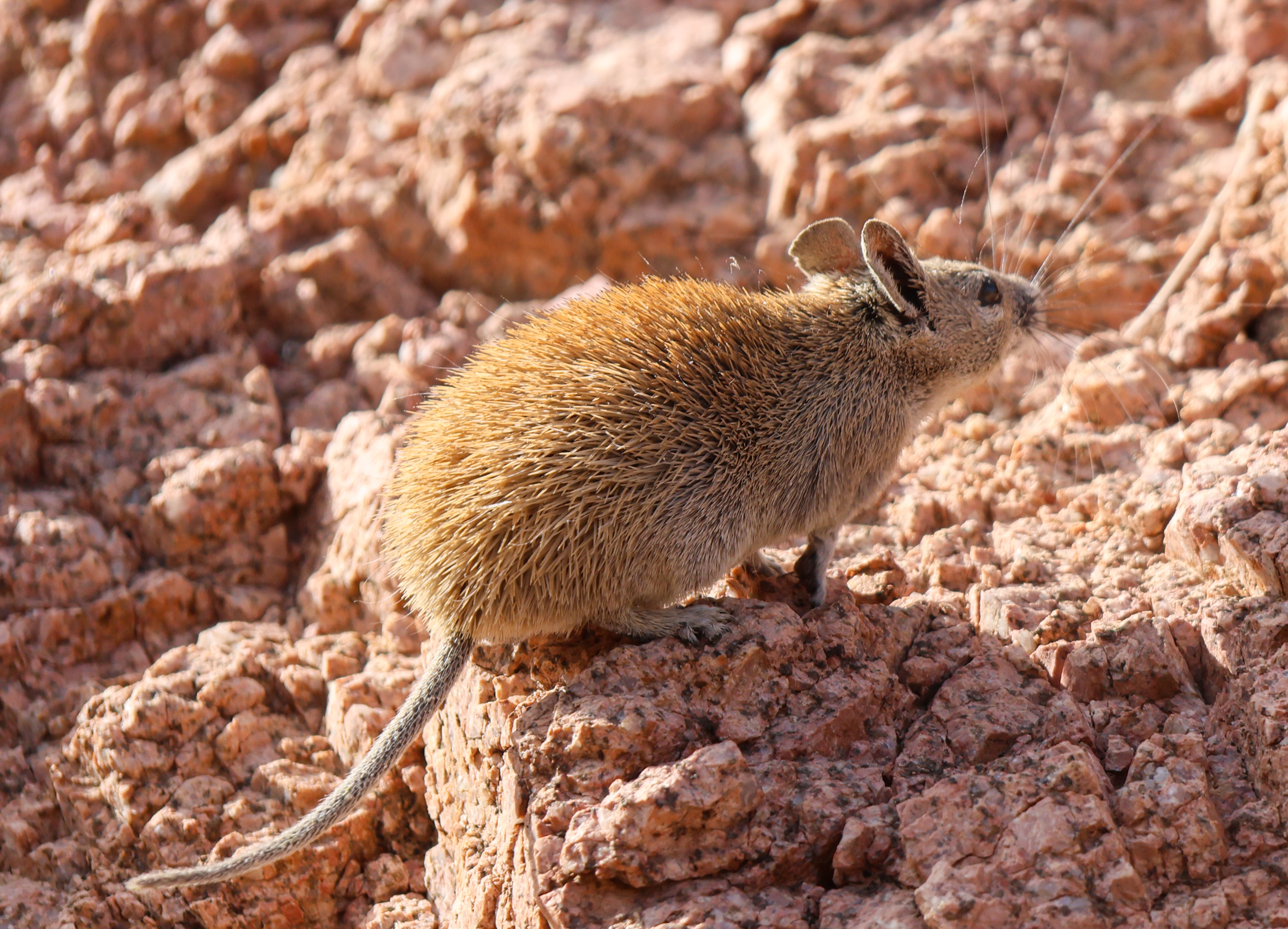
Golden Spiny Mouse from Saudi Arabia, Arabian Peninsula

The most frequently studied aspect of Acomys russatus is its apparent ability to switch from nocturnal to diurnal activity patterns. Specifically, it is naturally nocturnal, but will become diurnal when sharing a habitat with its congener, another spiny mouse species, Acomys cahirinus. Since the two species share food sources, competition does not allow for both of them to be active at the same time in the same habitat. Because of its tolerance for higher temperatures and significantly greater ability to conserve water by concentrating its urine, A. russatus is the species that is better suited to become day-active to eliminate this competition. When this occurs, there is a true switch in circadian rhythm that affects body systems such as metabolism and excretion. This new rhythm can furthermore adapt to seasonal changes in day length, as with any other diurnal species.
However, it is clear that the species has not completely evolved to be diurnal. In a lab setting where no other species is present, Acomys russatus immediately adopts nocturnal activity patterns with no transient phase, suggesting that its diurnal behavior is only an adaptation that is made when necessary. Furthermore, it has been found that the Golden Spiny Mouse's eyes have not evolved to fit a diurnal lifestyle, but rather match the normal pattern of a nocturnal animal. This finding, along with their preference to forage in areas of lower light, such as between and under boulders, further shows that, if not for environmental factors, golden spiny mice would be nocturnal animals.
