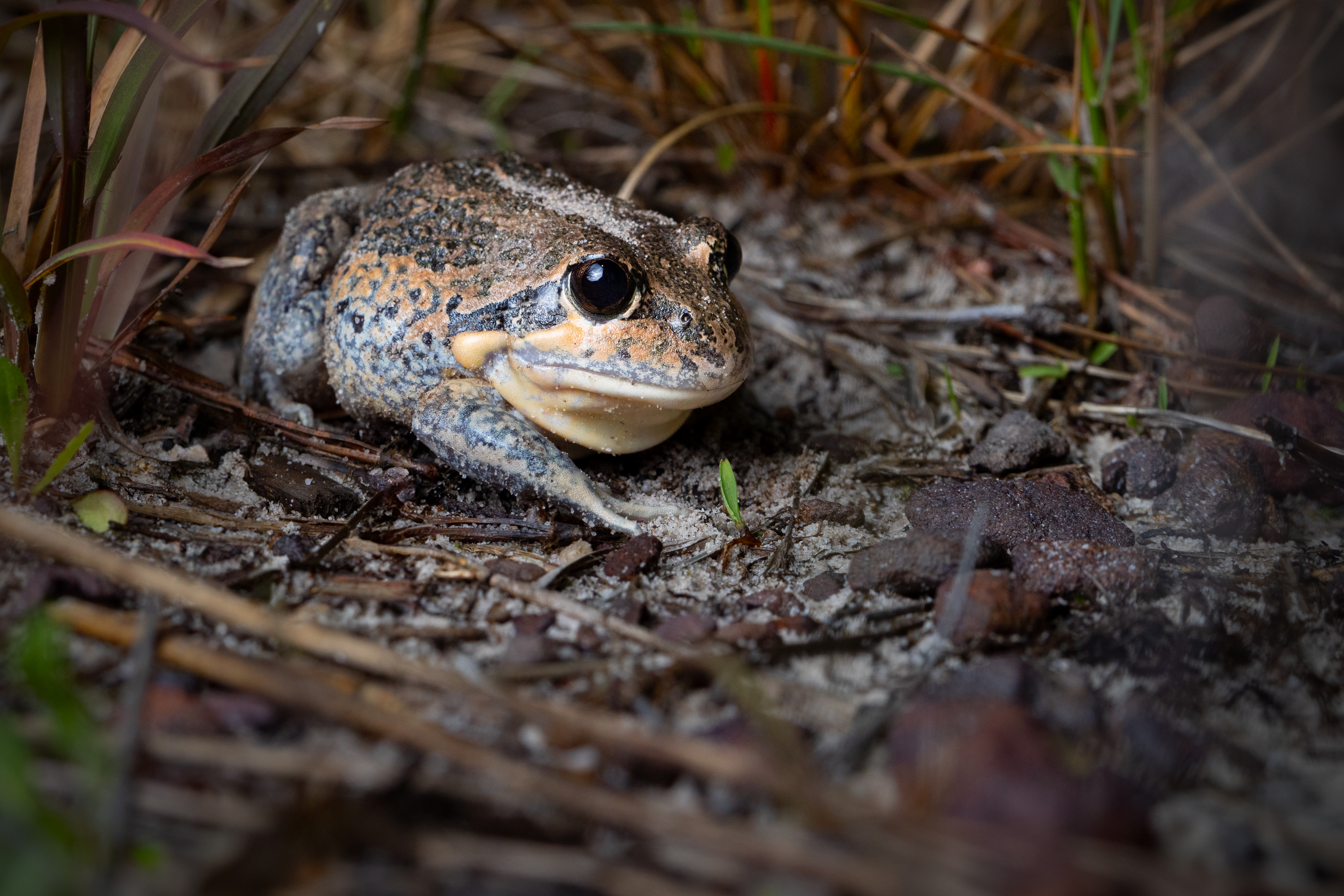
- Eastern banjo frog (Limnodynastes dumerilii dumerilii)

Conservation status
- Least Concern (IUCN 3.1)

Scientific classification
- Kingdom: Animalia
- Phylum: Chordata
- Class: Amphibia
- Order: Anura
- Family: Limnodynastidae
- Genus: Limnodynastes
- Species: L. dumerilii

Binomial name
- Limnodynastes dumerilii Peters, 1863

Subspecies
- L. d. dumerilii Peters, 1863; L. d. fryi Martin, 1972; L. d. grayi Steindachner, 1867; L. d. insularis Parker, 1940; L. d. variegata Martin, 1972
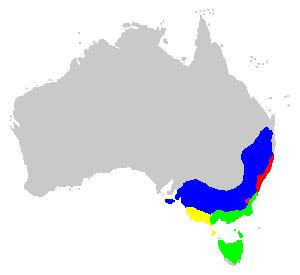
- Distribution of the Eastern Banjo Frog; Limnodynastes dumerilii dumerilii in blue; Limnodynastes dumerilii grayi in red; Limnodynastes dumerilii insularis in green; Limnodynastes dumerilii fryi in pink and Limnodynastes dumerilii variegata in yellow. This is a general distribution map and it is possible for an overlap of about 5% of the range of sub-species adjacent to each other.

= Limnodynastes dumerilii =

Species of amphibian

Limnodynastes dumerilii is a frog species from the family Limnodynastidae. The informal names for the species and its subspecies include eastern or southern banjo frog, and bull frog. The frog is also called the pobblebonk after its distinctive "bonk" call, which is likened to a banjo string being plucked. There are five subspecies of L. dumerilii, each with different skin coloration. The species is native to eastern Australia. There has been one occurrence in New Zealand, when tadpoles of the species were found in 1999 and destroyed.

== Description ==
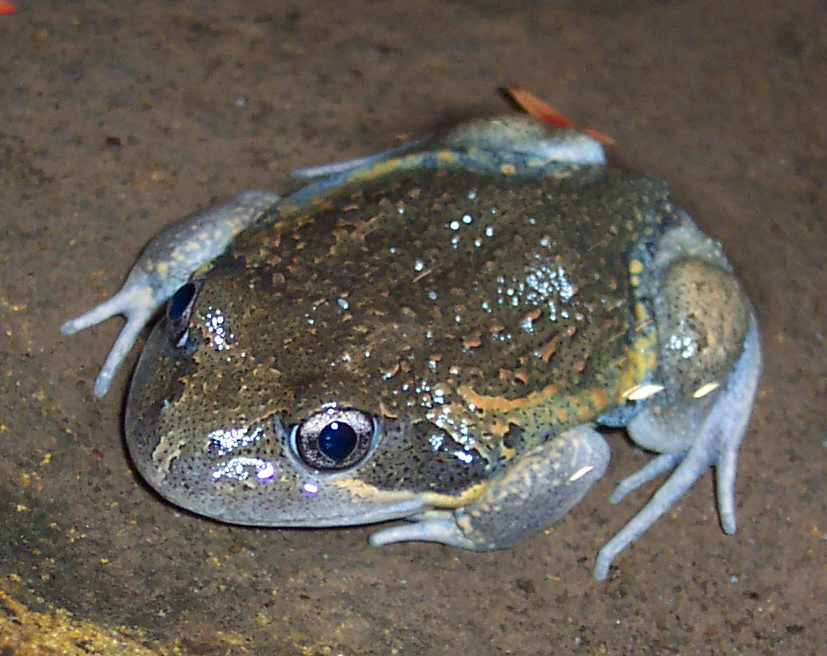
The eastern banjo frog, Limnodynastes dumerilii dumerilii

Adults are roughly seven to eight centimetres (2.8 to 3.1 in) long with dark warty backs, a prominent tibial gland, fleshy metatarsal tubercules and a smooth white or mottled belly. The tadpole stage is relatively long, lasting up to fifteen months. The species is common. The five subspecies of Limnodynastes dumerilii are:

=== Subspecies ===
==== Eastern banjo frog, Limnodynastes dumerilii dumerilii ====
This is the most widespread of the five subspecies. It is found in South-East Queensland, the Australian Capital Territory, the slopes and ranges of New South Wales, northern Victoria and the Murray River into South Australia. This subspecies normally inhabits woodland, heathland and farmland. Breeding takes place in streams, ponds and dams. Males of this subspecies have the most characteristic banjo-like "bonk" of all the subspecies. They are distinguished from other subspecies by more orange present on the flank and orange raised stripe present from the eye to the shoulder. The subspecies is normally one solid colour on the dorsal surface.

==== Eastern banjo frog, Limnodynastes dumerilii grayi ====
This subspecies occurs along the coast of New South Wales, Victoria and Tasmania It inhabits coastal swamps, dams, ponds associated with forest and heathland. This species does not breed in flowing water, which helps with distinguishing it from L. d. dumerilii in places where both occur. This is the most variegated of the subspecies, often with patches or blotches of a different colour on the dorsal surface. The call of this species sounds more like a "tok", similar but louder than the striped marsh frog.

==== Snowy Mountains banjo frog, Limnodynastes dumerilii fryi ====
This is the most restricted of the subspecies. It is only found in the Snowy Mountains area of south-eastern New South Wales. Males call from ponds or pools of streams in spring and summer. Due to its restricted range it is unlikely to be confused with other subspecies, however it is pale on the dorsal surface with fairly indistinct patches or variegations.

==== Southern banjo frog, Limnodynastes dumerilii insularis ====
This subspecies occurs south of Jervis Bay, along the south coast of New South Wales, in eastern Victoria and throughout Tasmania. It is characterised and distinguished by blue coloration present on the flank. There is often a pale mid-dorsal stripe. Males call from a concealed position in water during spring, summer and autumn.

==== Southern banjo frog, Limnodynastes dumerilii variegata ====
This subspecies is very similar to Limnodynastes dumerilii insularis. This subspecies occurs in western Victoria and south-eastern South Australia. It is chiefly distinguished by range.

== Ecology and behaviour ==
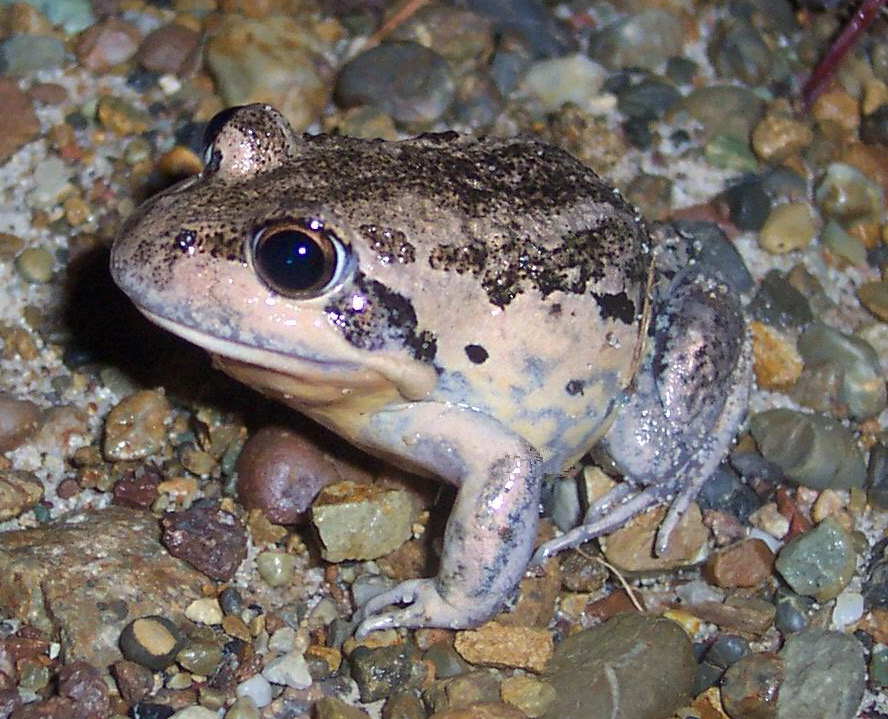
The eastern banjo frog, Limnodynastes dumerilii grayi

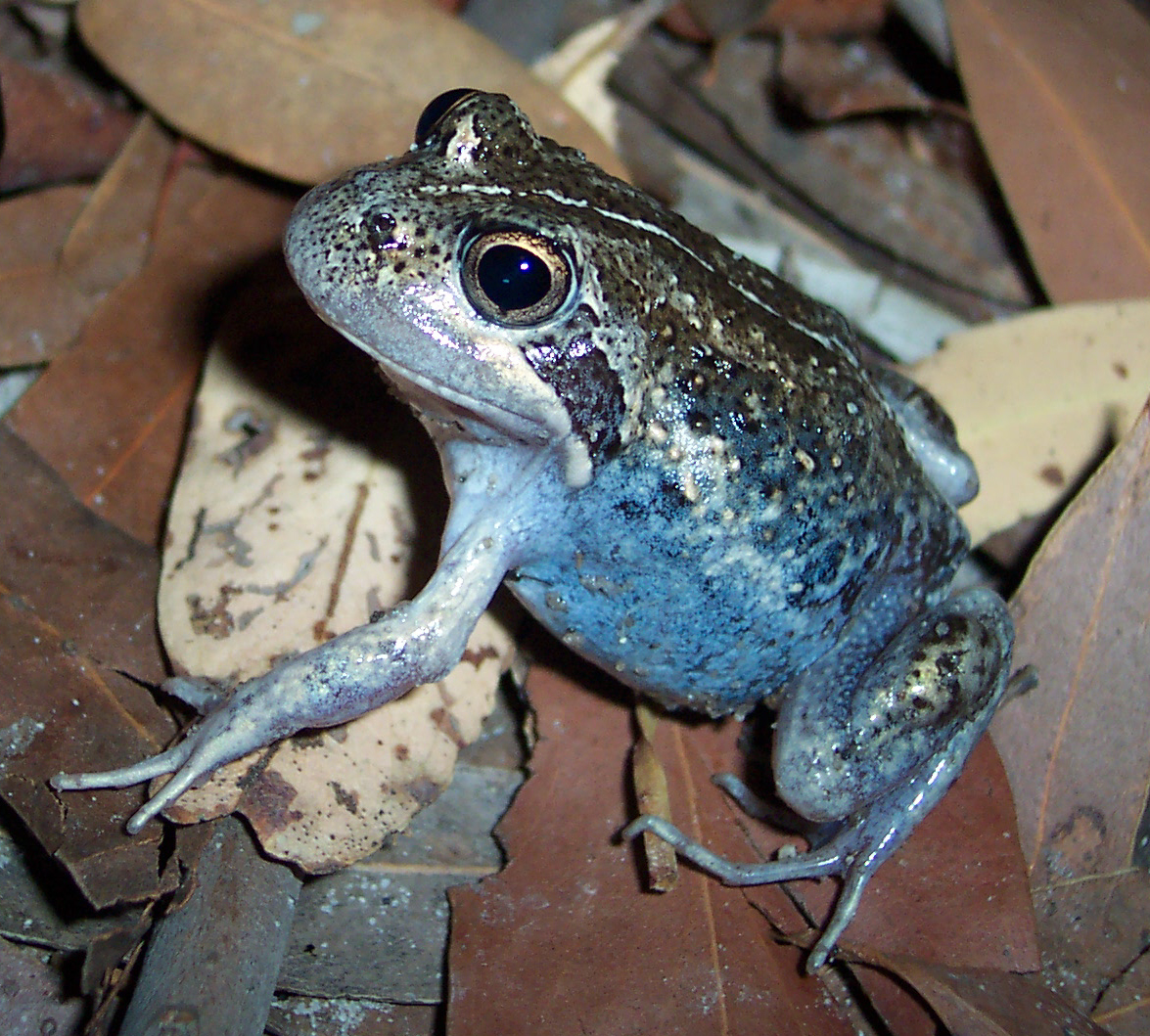
The southern banjo frog, Limnodynastes dumerilii insularis

Limnodynastes dumerilii is a burrowing frog. During dry times, and often just during the day, they will burrow underground. They will often be seen in large numbers after rain, and under the right conditions mass spawning can occur over just a few days. They have been known to call while underground, and can do so at any time of the year after rain. The Eastern banjo frog was the first of the species to have its reference genome sequenced, finding a compact (for an amphibian) 2.38 Gb genome and 24,548 protein-coding genes.

=== Breeding habits ===
Breeding occurs in stagnant aquatic habitats like ponds or swamps. During November to February, males will begin calling from behind vegetation or from within the water at females. Eggs are laid on the surface of bodies of water in the form of a distinct foamy mass, the frog can lay up to 4000 eggs. Tadpoles reach up to 7 cm, a dark and gold spotted appearance and take 4–5 months to mature into frogs.

== Related species ==
In Western Australia the western banjo frog, Limnodynastes dorsalis, is common around Perth. It also has a musical, resonant "plonk" call and is also called a pobblebonk.

In Queensland, the scarlet-sided pobblebonk, Limnodynastes terraereginae, is a small fat frog with distinctive orange or red irregular markings.

In Western New South Wales, the giant banjo frog, Limnodynastes interioris, is a similar species that tends to inhabit more arid areas than Limnodynastes dumerilii.
