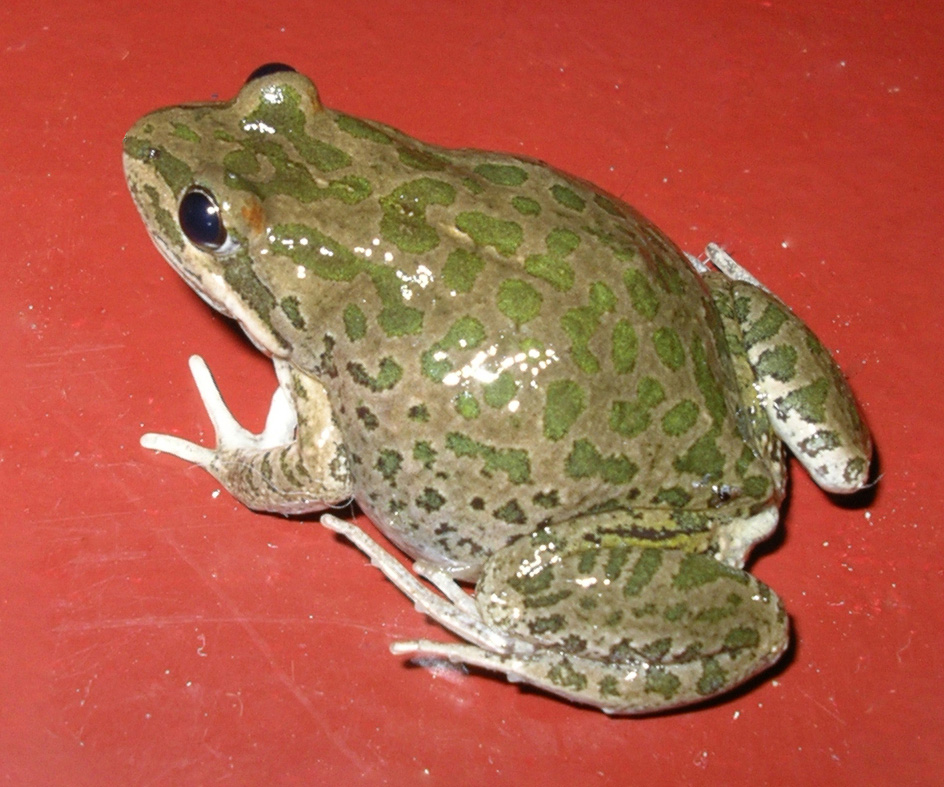

Conservation status
- Least Concern (IUCN 3.1)

Scientific classification
- Kingdom: Animalia
- Phylum: Chordata
- Class: Amphibia
- Order: Anura
- Family: Limnodynastidae
- Genus: Limnodynastes
- Species: L. tasmaniensis

Binomial name
- Limnodynastes tasmaniensis Günther, 1858
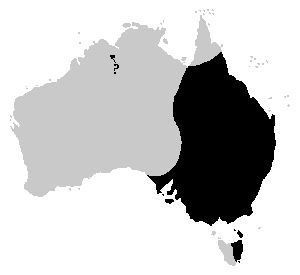
- Spotted grass frog range

= Spotted grass frog =

Species of amphibian

The spotted grass frog or spotted marsh frog (Limnodynastes tasmaniensis) is a terrestrial frog native to Australia. It is distributed throughout all of New South Wales and Victoria, eastern South Australia, the majority of Queensland, and eastern Tasmania. It is also naturalised in Western Australia, having been unintentionally introduced at Kununurra in the 1970s, apparently during the relocation of several hundred transportable homes from Adelaide.

The spotted grass frog was also formerly known as the "Marbled frog" in South Australia, although this common name is also used for Limnodynastes convexiusculus, a species of ground-dwelling frog native to northern and north-eastern Australia, and southern New Guinea.

== Description ==
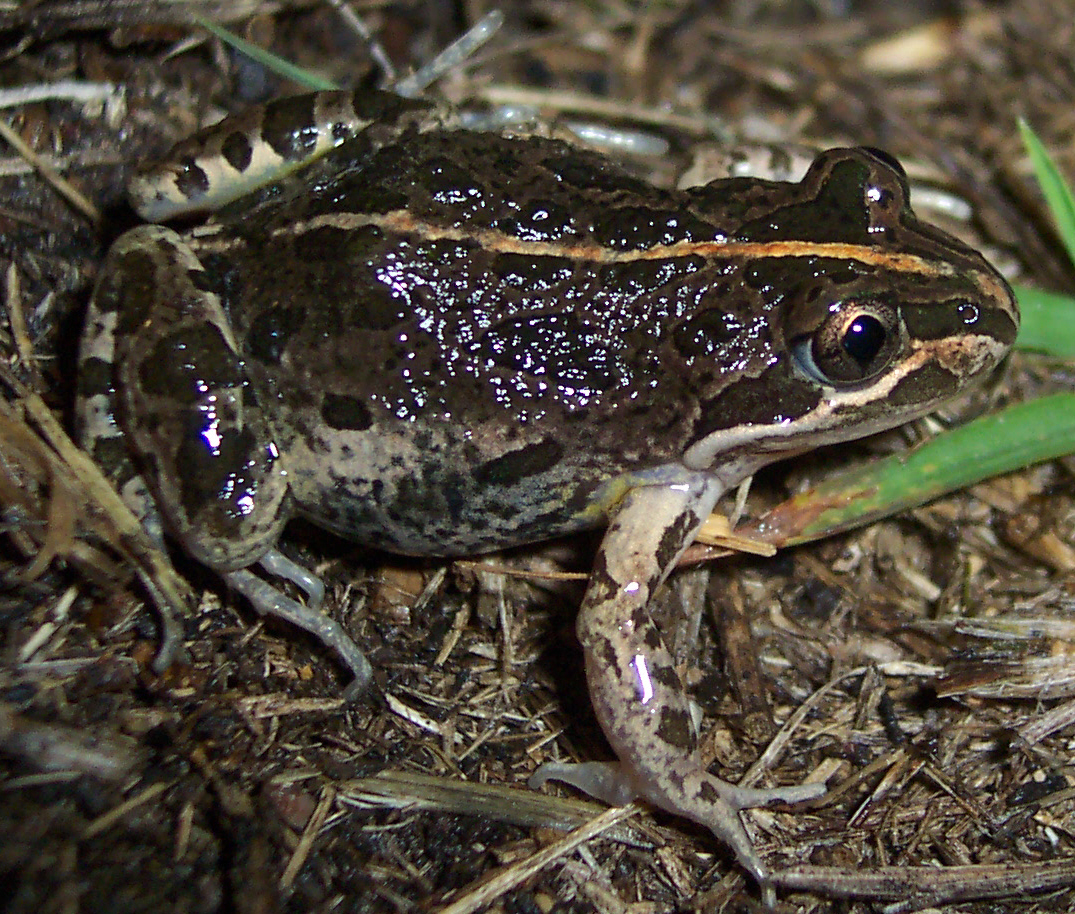
A Spotted Grass Frog demonstrating an orange mid-dorsal stripe.

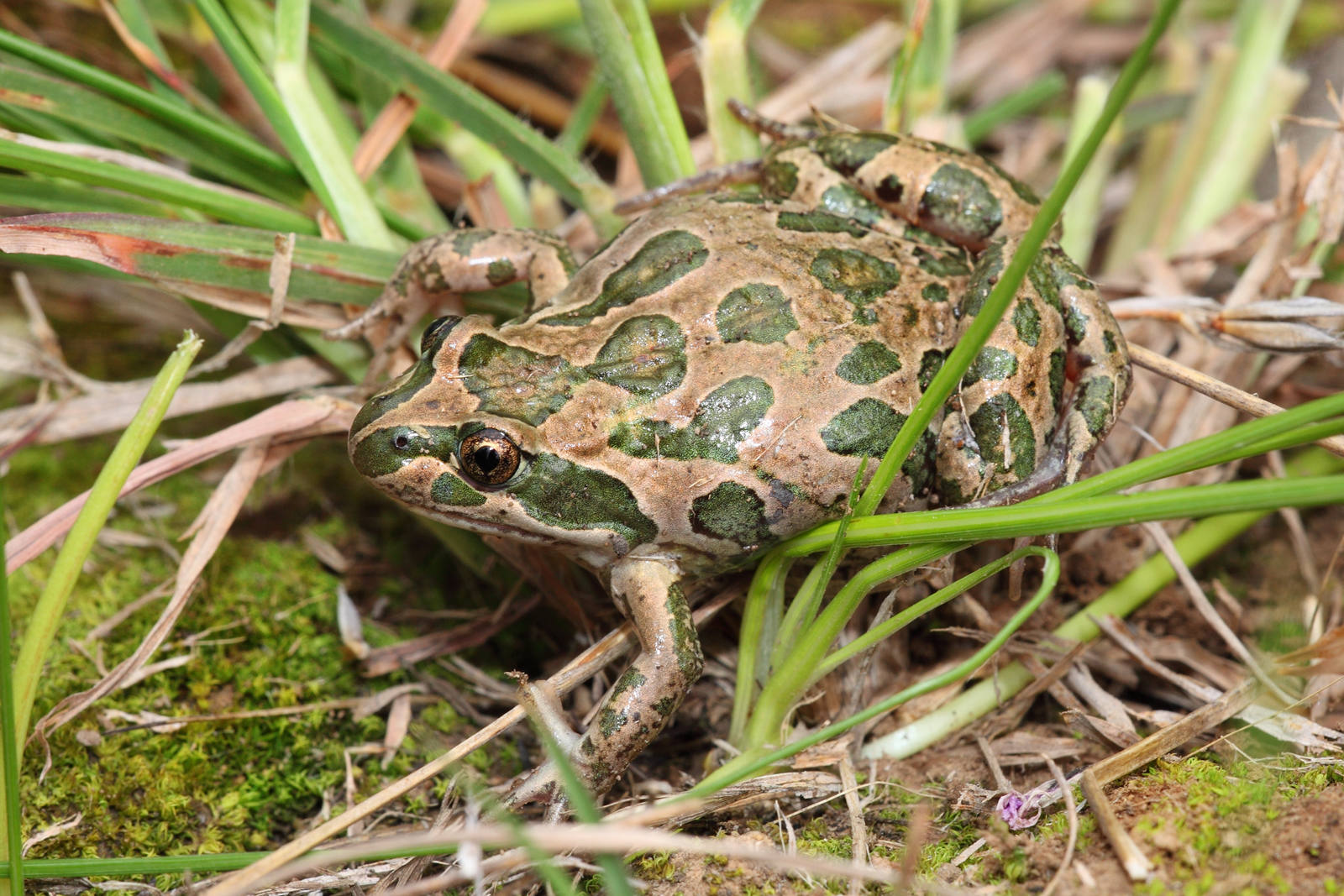
Demonstrating larger blotches

This frog reaches 45 mm (1.8 in) in length. Its colour ranges from light brown to olive-green, with large, irregular shaped, green or brown spots on its back. Occasionally it will have a thin, pale cream, yellow or bright orange stripe running from snout to vent. There is a raised pale stripe running from below the eye to the base of the arm. The arms and legs are spotted like the back, and the belly is white.

== Ecology and behaviour ==
This frog is common throughout Australia and is one of the first species to inhabit new dams and ditches. This species is associated with most habitats, including permanent or temporary dams, roadside ditches, ponds, flooded grassland and slow moving creeks, in urban areas, farmland, woodland, coastal areas and arid areas. The frog is usually found in grass or under other cover, near a still water source.

== Breeding ==
The males calling and the breeding will occur pretty much all year round, finishing during summer. The call of this frog varies from a staccato machine gun sounding burst to a single 'Tok' sound, depending on the call race, which varies geographically. The machine gun call is the northern call race, throughout NSW and QLD. The 'tok' call is the southern call race, which occurs in southern VIC and TAS.

The male and female frogs can be sexed by the presence of a flap of skin around the thumbs of the females. This is used to froth the water during amplexus to create the floating foamy nest that it lays eggs in, which is roughly the size of a human palm. The tadpoles of this frog are comparatively large (up to 6 cm (2.4 in). This frog spends a minimum of 3 months in the tadpole stage.

== Similar species ==
This species is commonly confused with the Long-thumbed Frog (Limnodynastes fletcheri), with which there is a regional overlap. The two frogs can be distinguished by a disproportionately long second digit of the inner front toes in the case of L. fletcheri. The long-thumbed frog also has larger irregular shaped spots on the back and a red/purple eyelid, which is uncommon in L. tasmaniensis.

== As a pet ==
Spotted grass frogs are known to be kept as pets; in Australia this animal may be kept in captivity with the appropriate permit
