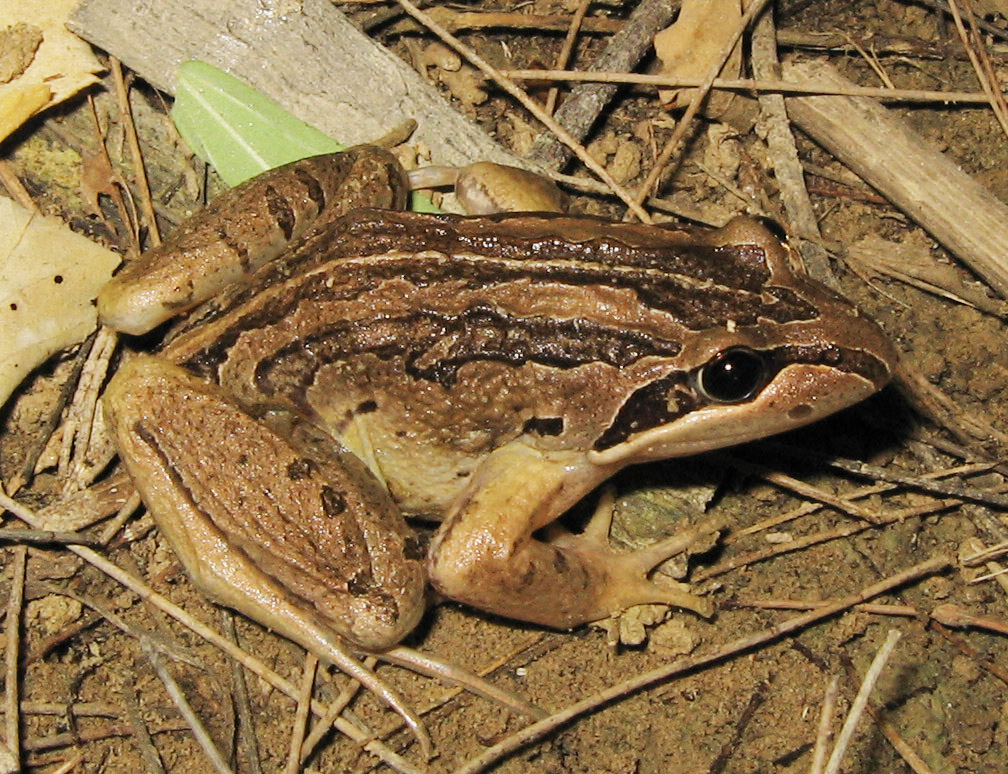
- The striped marsh frog (Limnodynastes peronii)

Scientific classification
- Domain: Eukaryota
- Kingdom: Animalia
- Phylum: Chordata
- Class: Amphibia
- Order: Anura
- Family: Limnodynastidae
- Genus: Limnodynastes; Fitzinger, 1843

Species
- 11, See text

= Limnodynastes =

Genus of amphibians

Limnodynastes (commonly known as the Australian swamp frogs) is a genus of frog native to Australia, southern New Guinea and some Torres Strait Islands. They are ground-dwelling frogs, with no toe pads. The size varies from 45 mm to 90 mm in the giant banjo frog. The webbing on the feet ranges between species, from very little, to almost complete. The tympanum is not visible in any species, except in the woodworker frog, which is sometimes classed in a separate genus Megistolotis. All species construct a foam nest in which the eggs are laid. However, in south-eastern South Australia female striped marsh frog and spotted grass frog lack the flanges of skin on the hands that helps trap the air bubble and do not construct foam nests.

== Species ==
Following a major revision of amphibians in 2006, two species, the ornate burrowing frog, Opisthodon ornatus and Spencer's burrowing frog, Opisthodon spenceri, were moved to the resurrected genus Opisthodon. This reduced the number of member species to eleven.

Common name	Binomial name
Marbled frog	Limnodynastes convexiusculus (Macleay, 1878)
Flat-headed frog	Limnodynastes depressus Tyler, 1976
Western banjo frog or Pobblebonk	Limnodynastes dorsalis (Gray, 1841)
Eastern banjo frog	Limnodynastes dumerilii Peters, 1863
Long-thumbed frog	Limnodynastes fletcheri Boulenger, 1888
Giant banjo frog	Limnodynastes interioris Fry, 1913
Woodworker frog	Limnodynastes lignarius (Tyler, Martin, and Davies, 1979)
Striped marsh frog or brown-striped frog	Limnodynastes peronii (Duméril and Bibron, 1841)
Salmon-striped frog	Limnodynastes salmini Steindachner, 1867
Spotted grass frog	Limnodynastes tasmaniensis Günther, 1858
Northern banjo frog	Limnodynastes terraereginae Fry, 1915
