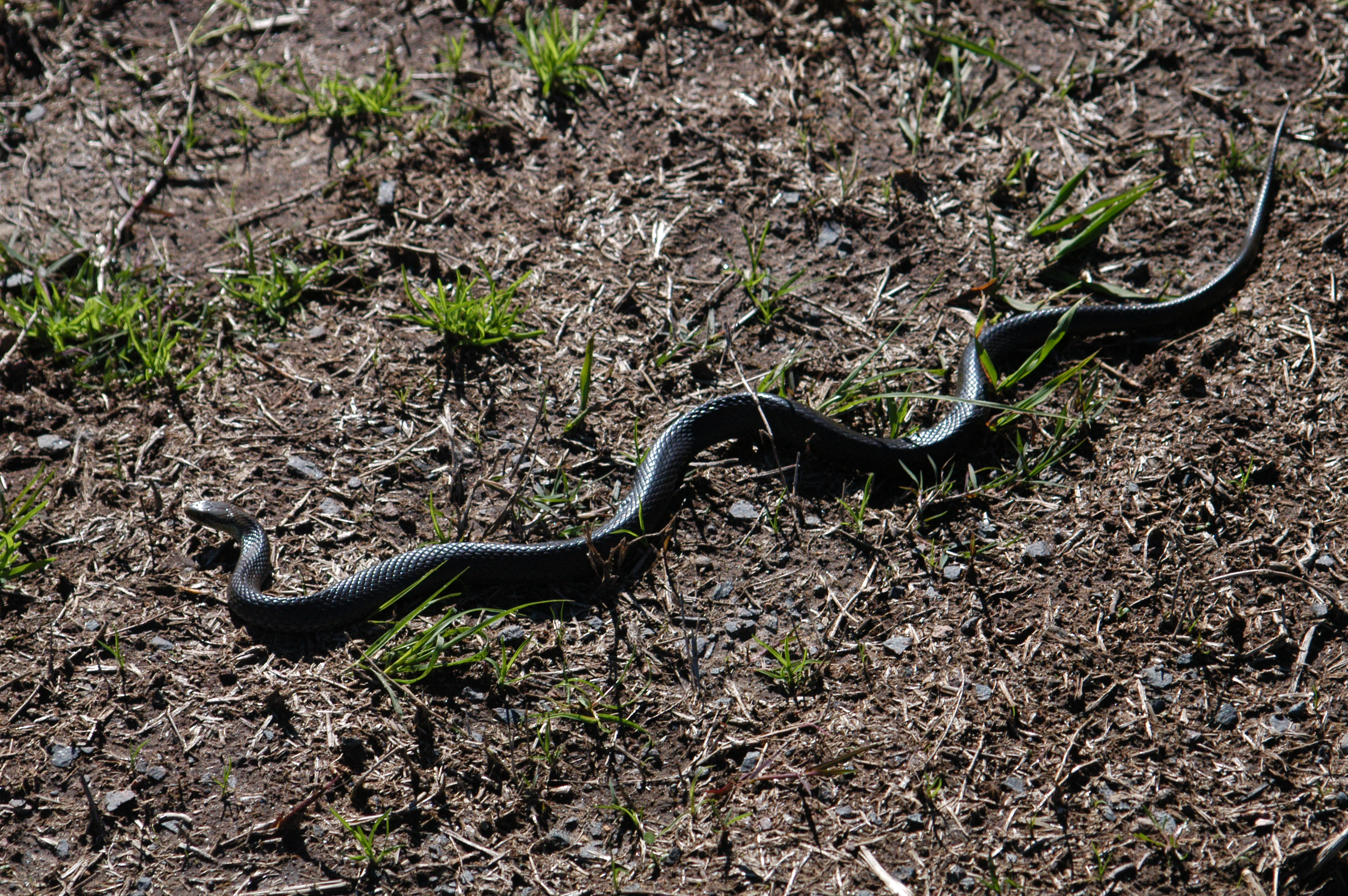
- Hemiaspis signata

Scientific classification
- Kingdom: Animalia
- Phylum: Chordata
- Class: Reptilia
- Order: Squamata
- Suborder: Serpentes
- Family: Elapidae
- Subfamily: Hydrophiinae
- Genus: Hemiaspis; Fitzinger, 1861

Species
- Hemiaspis damelii (Günther, 1876); Hemiaspis signata (Jan, 1859)

= Hemiaspis =

Genus of snakes

Hemiaspis is a genus of venomous snakes of the Elapidae family. The genus has two described species: Hemiaspis damelii and Hemiaspis signata, both endemic to Australia.
