= Flat-headed frog =

Conservation status
- Least Concern (IUCN 3.1)

Scientific classification
- Kingdom: Animalia
- Phylum: Chordata
- Class: Amphibia
- Order: Anura
- Family: Limnodynastidae
- Genus: Limnodynastes
- Species: L. depressus

Binomial name
- Limnodynastes depressus Tyler, 1976

Species of amphibian

The flat-headed frog (Limnodynastes depressus) is a species of frog in the family Limnodynastidae. It is endemic to Australia. Its natural habitats are subtropical and tropical dry lowland grassland and freshwater marshes. It is threatened by habitat loss.
