= Superb banjo frog =

Conservation status
- Least Concern (IUCN 3.1)

Scientific classification
- Kingdom: Animalia
- Phylum: Chordata
- Class: Amphibia
- Order: Anura
- Family: Limnodynastidae
- Genus: Limnodynastes
- Species: L. terraereginae

Binomial name
- Limnodynastes terraereginae Fry, 1915

Species of amphibian

The superb banjo frog (Limnodynastes terraereginae) is a species of ground-dwelling burrowing frogs native to Cape York, far-northern Queensland, Australia.

== Description ==
This is a large species of frog reaching 94 mm in length. It is brown above with irregular darker blotches with magenta suffusions markings in the thighs and bright yellow flanks. There is a dark band which runs from the snout to the shoulder. It is underlined by a raised cream to orange bar. The armpit is orange and the belly is white. The distinctive abrupt calls of this group give them the name Banjo Frogs or Pobblebonks.

== Ecology and behaviour ==
It is a burrowing species and will spend time underground during dry periods. It is associated with dams, flooded areas and ditches in forest, woodland, cleared land or farmland. Males make a high pitched "bonk" call from concealed positions in water after heavy rains from October to May.

Eggs are laid in a large floating foamy mass. Tadpoles hatch about 2 to 3 days after laying. Tadpoles are very dark brown and reach 70 mm. Tadpole development takes about 70 days and metamorphs measure 20 mm and resemble the adult, however thigh coloration does not become apparent until about 1 week later.

== Similar species ==
It is similar to the scarlet-sided banjo frog and the coastal banjo frog, from which it can be distinguished on distribution, size, coloration and calls.
