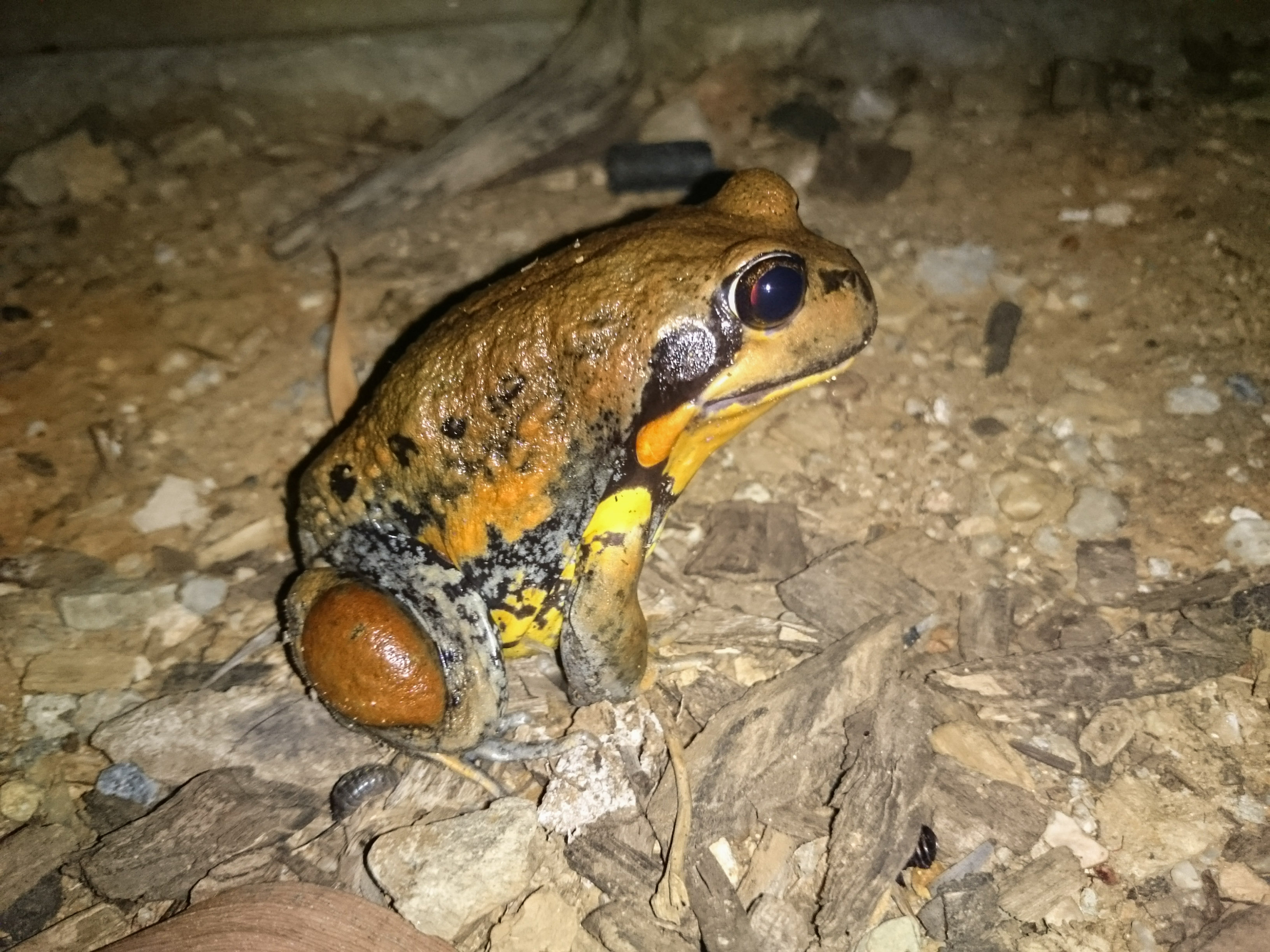

Conservation status
- Least Concern (IUCN 3.1)

Scientific classification
- Kingdom: Animalia
- Phylum: Chordata
- Class: Amphibia
- Order: Anura
- Family: Limnodynastidae
- Genus: Limnodynastes
- Species: L. interioris

Binomial name
- Limnodynastes interioris Fry, 1913
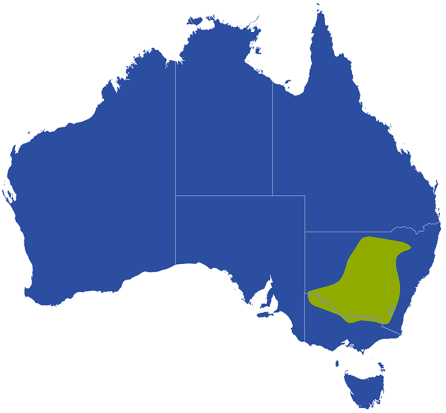
- Distribution of the Giant Banjo Frog

= Giant banjo frog =

Species of amphibian

The giant banjo frog, giant pobblebonk frog, giant bullfrog, or great bullfrog (Limnodynastes interioris) is a species of frog, endemic to Australia, in the family Limnodynastidae. Fry was the first to recognise the species of giant banjo frog (Limnodynastes interioris) as a distinct subspecies of banjo frog (Genus: Limnodynastes), differing from the similar Southern or Eastern banjo frogs (Limnodynastes dumerilii) which occupied most of eastern Australia.

== Description ==
The giant banjo frog grows to an average length of between 7 and 9 cm (2.8 and 3.5 in). The skin on its back is mostly brown with irregular black markings and a bumpy texture while its underside is pale to bright yellow and smooth. Along the sides of the body, the coloring ranges from red-brown to fawn with black and grey flecks with a black stripe from its snout down to its sides. The iris is a dark specked gold and the pupil is horizontal. Front feet are unwebbed and back feet are semi-webbed with a large, shovel-shaped metatarsal tubercle on the under-surface of each foot. The toes are strong, without discs and are predominantly for burrowing beneath the surface of soil.

The eggs appear pigmented and are spawned within a large foam mass situated within flooded burrows and surrounded by vegetation. The tadpoles are quite large in comparison to other Banjo Frog species, growing up to 9.5 cm (3.7 in) in length, and are dark brown, or black in color with gold clusters and dark grey fins.

== Taxonomy ==
Fry was the first to recognise the species of giant banjo frog (Limnodynastes interioris) as a distinct subspecies of banjo frog (Genus: Limnodynastes), differing from the similar Southern or Eastern banjo frogs (Limnodynastes dumerili) which occupied most of eastern Australia (see Scientific classification for full taxonomy).

== Ecology ==
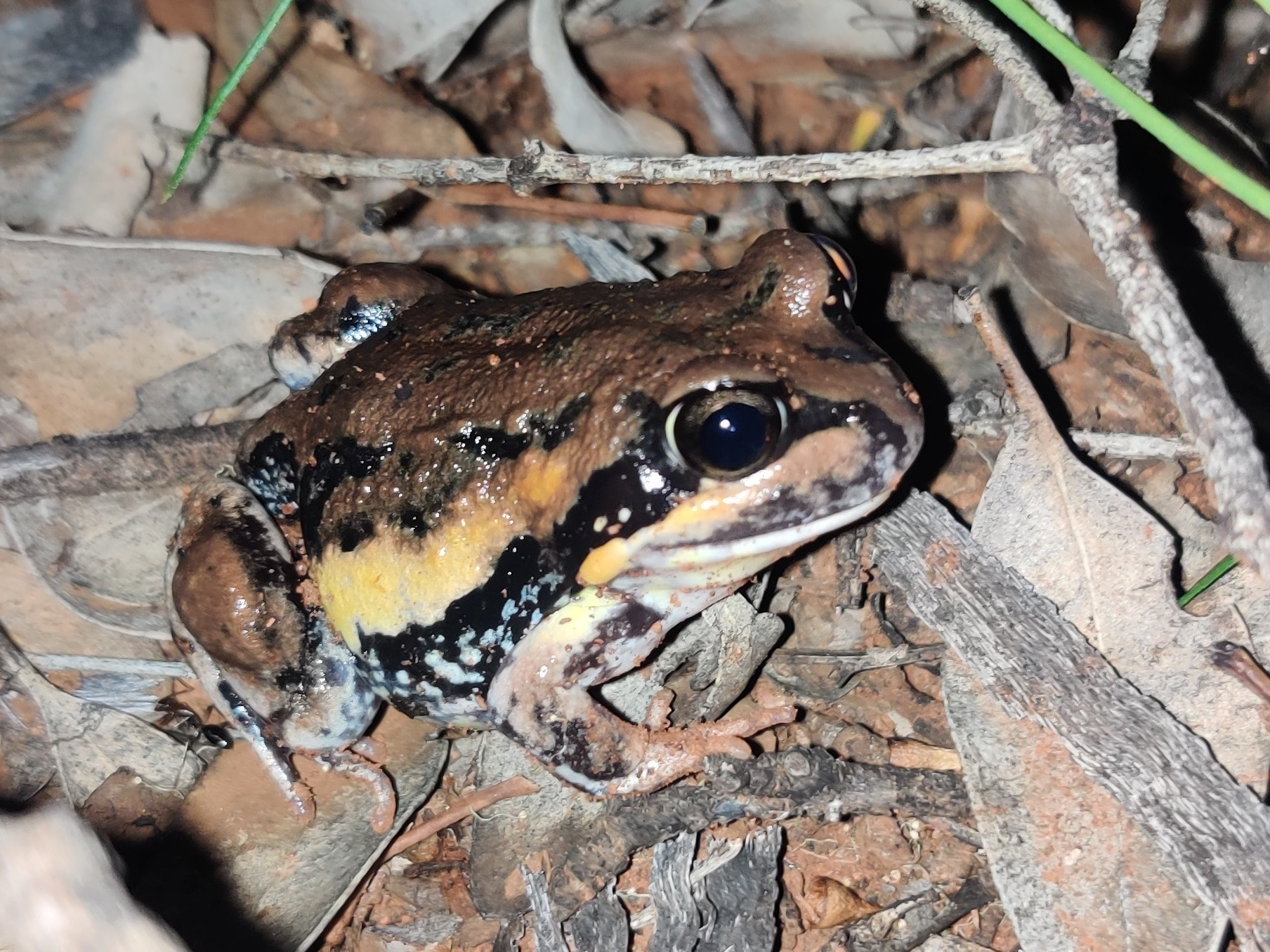
Giant Banjo Frog in its natural habitat in Cobar, NSW Australia

=== Distribution ===
The giant banjo frog is endemic to Australia and inhabits the arid region of central New South Wales and northern Victoria. It is largely restricted to Murray-Darling Basin and the floodplains of the Murray River. The area of occurrence of the Giant Banjo Frog covers an area of approximately 214,800 km^{2} (82,900 sq mi) (see Distribution map).

=== Population ===
The giant banjo frog has a large and stable population with a conservation status of least concern. However, their habitat is threatened by habitat loss due to hydrological modifications of the Murray-Darling Basin which significantly disrupts inland floodplain frog communities.

Despite a general negative impact of introduced species on inland frog communities, the presence of common carp (Cyprinus carpio) was shown to have a positive effect on the abundance of the giant banjo frog, this could be due to indirect effects of carp on the survival of predators to the tadpoles of the giant banjo frog.

=== Habitat ===
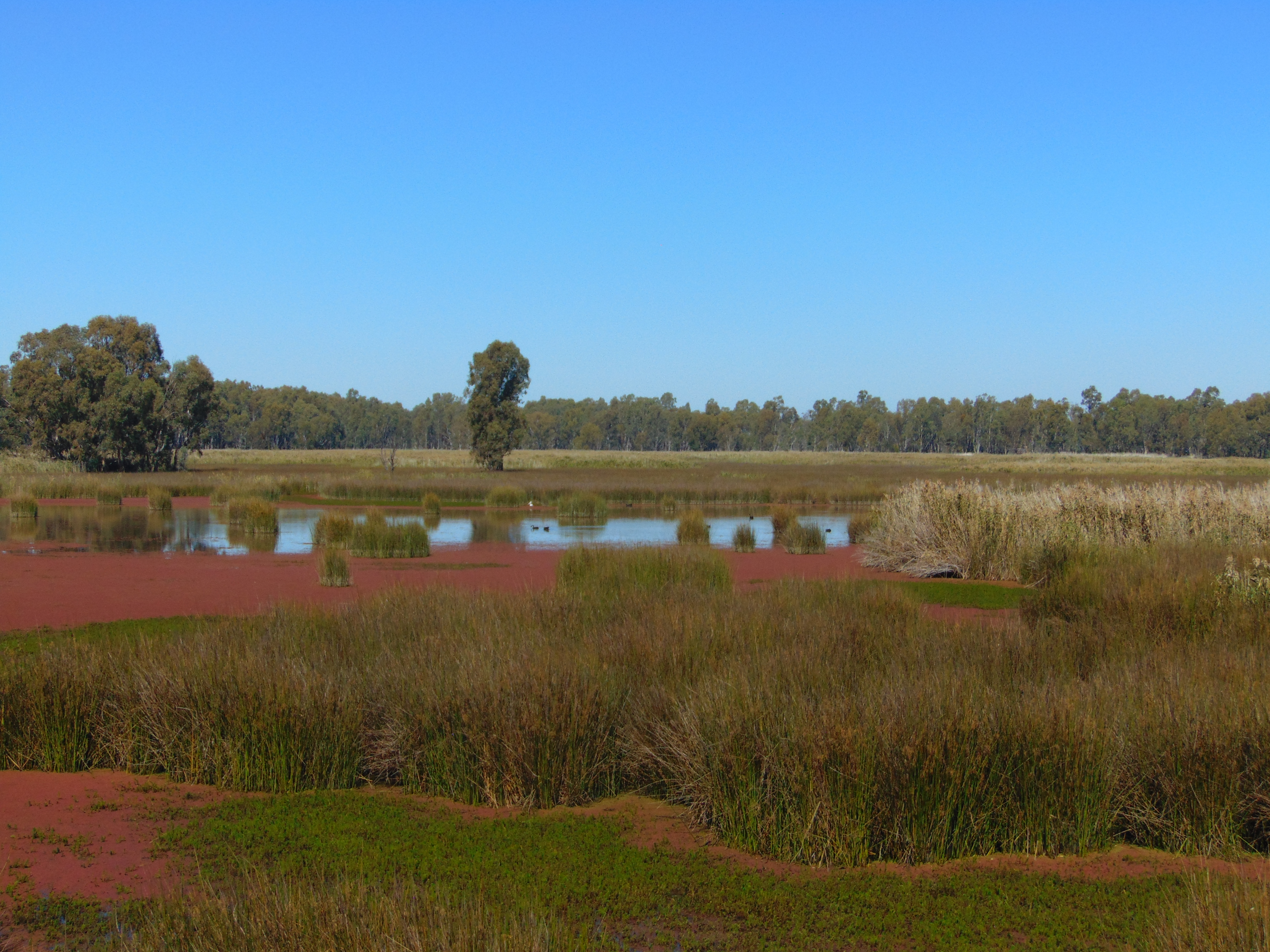
Freshwater marsh habitat of the giant banjo frog, Murray River, NSW Australia

The giant banjo frog spends the majority of its time underground and tends to only emerge after rain to feed and lay eggs. Their natural habitat is usually close to freshwater floodplains, marshes, swamps and ponds but can also be found in dry temperate forests, grassland and dry savanna. The Giant Banjo Frog is dissimilar to many other arid-adapted amphibians in the fact that it spends a large stage of its life-cycle in aquatic environments. Eggs are spawned in water, found mostly in flooded burrows, dams, swamps, and ponds and; tadpoles live in either slow moving or still water.

The giant banjo frog occurrence was found to be higher at permanent wetlands away from the main river channel of the Murray River and with more complex vegetation structure.

=== Diet ===
The giant banjo frog is a carnivore. Adults feed on a wide variety of insects, worms and spiders. Its refuge among complex vegetation sources provides a substrate for food sources.

=== Environmental Adaptations ===
For individuals to survive during periods of extended drought, the giant banjo frog has adapted stronger and shovel-shaped limbs to increase its burrowing ability. This is a specific adaptation of frogs that are found in arid regions with variable rainfall. The development of a larger body and capacity to burrow has allowed the relatively long-lived species to become more resilient to the arid climate and therefore it is seen to be of lower susceptibility to future climate changes. The giant banjo frog is a non-cocoon forming species and therefore tends to dig deeper during periods of drought to maintain adequate moisture.

== Life-History Traits ==
=== Lifespan ===
Similar to other species of frogs, the giant banjo frog lives an average lifespan of 10 years in the wild. During hotter and drier months, the frog spends prolonged periods aestivating where they are in a state of dormancy.

=== Nesting ===
Eggs are spawned in a nest made up of a large foamy mass situated on the surface of the static or slow flowing water in flooded burrows, ponds, dams or stream pools. The nest is constructed around vegetation to keep it from moving too far, the tadpoles are then able to drop into the still water below to mature.

=== Reproduction ===
Giant banjo frogs breeds during spring and summer and occasionally autumn if rainfall is adequate. The reproductive cycle of the giant banjo frog requires semi-permanent bodies of water, where each female can lay up to 4000 eggs. After the spawning phase eggs will hatch within a few days and tend to remain on the bottom of the water. The next stage of larval development where tadpoles mature into frogs takes around two and a half months.

== Behaviour ==
=== Calls ===
The peak calling period of the giant banjo frog is between September and November. Males call from vegetation or flooded burrows. The genus of Banjo Frogs is known for its distinctive "bonk" sound, similar to that of a banjo being plucked, with the giant banjo frog having a short deep note with a similar, but lower dominant frequency, to that of the Southern or Eastern banjo frog (Limnodynastes dumerilii). Males often synchronise their calls with surrounding frogs which causes a rapid series of "bonk" sounds.

=== Evolutionary relationships ===
Giant banjo frogs have been known to take advantage of Malleefowl (Leipoa ocellata) incubation mounds, which provide high moisture content and soft enough soil with which to dig, providing optimal aestivation sites. This has allowed giant banjo frogs to live on agricultural land when soil can typically be too dry and compacted for them. This relationship has the potential to impact this type of habitat for giant banjo frogs due to predation by foxes of the malleefowl, which is listed as a vulnerable species under the EPBC Act 1999.

== Threats ==
=== Environmental ===
Although the giant banjo frog is relatively resilient to periods of drought, other indirect effects such as retreating water tables or an increase in groundwater salinity has the potential to limit their ability to thrive throughout extended dry periods.

=== Human Interaction ===
An increase in agricultural practices, manufacturing and land-use around the Murray-Darling Basin has led to a decline in health of the area and its inhabitants. The Murray-Darling Basin is an ecological hotspot for not only the giant banjo frog but many other native plants, fish, reptiles, amphibians, birds and mammals.

== Conservation ==
The giant banjo frog is currently listed as species of Least Concern under the EPBC Act 1999. There is currently no conservation efforts in place for the giant banjo frog, but management of the Murray-Darling Basin includes plans to mitigate overall habitat loss and conserve Australia's natural landscape in the area.
