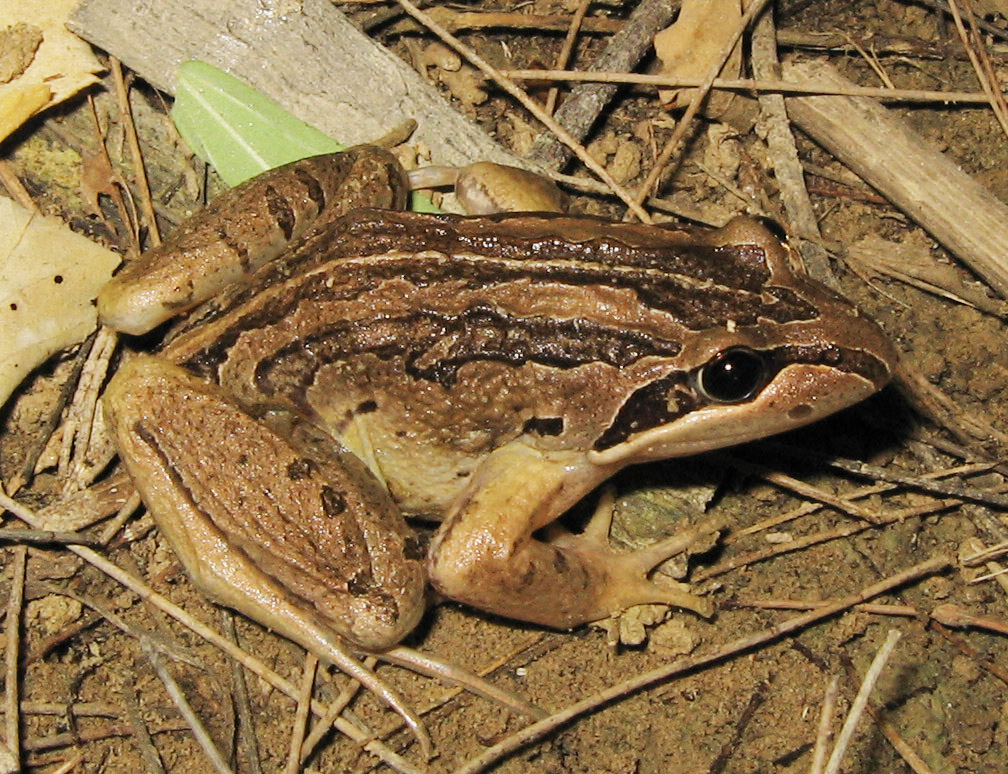

Conservation status
- Least Concern (IUCN 3.1)

Scientific classification
- Kingdom: Animalia
- Phylum: Chordata
- Class: Amphibia
- Order: Anura
- Family: Limnodynastidae
- Genus: Limnodynastes
- Species: L. peronii

Binomial name
- Limnodynastes peronii (A.M.C. Duméril& Bibron, 1841)
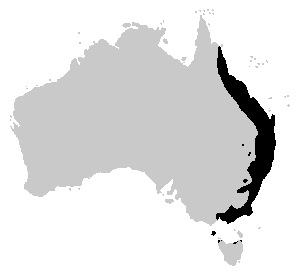
- Striped marsh frog geographic distribution (in black)

Synonyms
- Cystignathus peronii A.M.C. Dumeril & Bibron, 1841; Borborocoetes peronii (A.M.C. Duméril & Bibron, 1841); Wagleria peronii (A.M.C. Duméril & Bibron, 1841); Limnodynastes krefftii Günther, 1863; Limnodynastes lineatus De Vis, 1884

= Striped marsh frog =

Species of amphibian

The striped marsh frog (Limnodynastes peronii), also called the brown-striped frog, is a species of predominantly aquatic frog in the family Limnodynastidae. The species is native to coastal eastern Australia. It is a common species in urban habitats.

== Taxonomy and etymology ==
The striped marsh frog was described by French naturalists André Marie Constant Duméril and Gabriel Bibron in 1841. The specific name, peronii, is in honor of François Péron, a French naturalist and explorer.

== Description ==
Females of Limnodynastes peronii may reach a head + body length of 75 millimetres (3.0 in) and males 70 millimetres (2.8 in). Both sexes are a shade of brown on the dorsal surface. This colour can be light or dark; it can also be a red-brown on the dorsal surface. There are distinct darker stripes running down the frogs back (giving this species its common names). There is normally a paler mid-dorsal stripe running down the back. There is a black "mask" that runs from the nostril, through the eye and down to the shoulder. This "mask" is followed by a thick light golden line that runs underneath the "mask" and terminates at the end of the mouth. Breeding males develop thick arms, which are used in "wrestling" matches with other frogs. The throat of males is yellow in colour. The belly is white.

== Geographic distribution ==
Limnodynastes peronii is distributed from the southern parts of the Cape York Peninsula in North Queensland, through all of coastal New South Wales, Southern Victoria to southeastern South Australia and Northern Tasmania. Although this species is very common in coastal NSW, it is not common in Tasmania and listed as rare.

== Ecology and behaviour ==
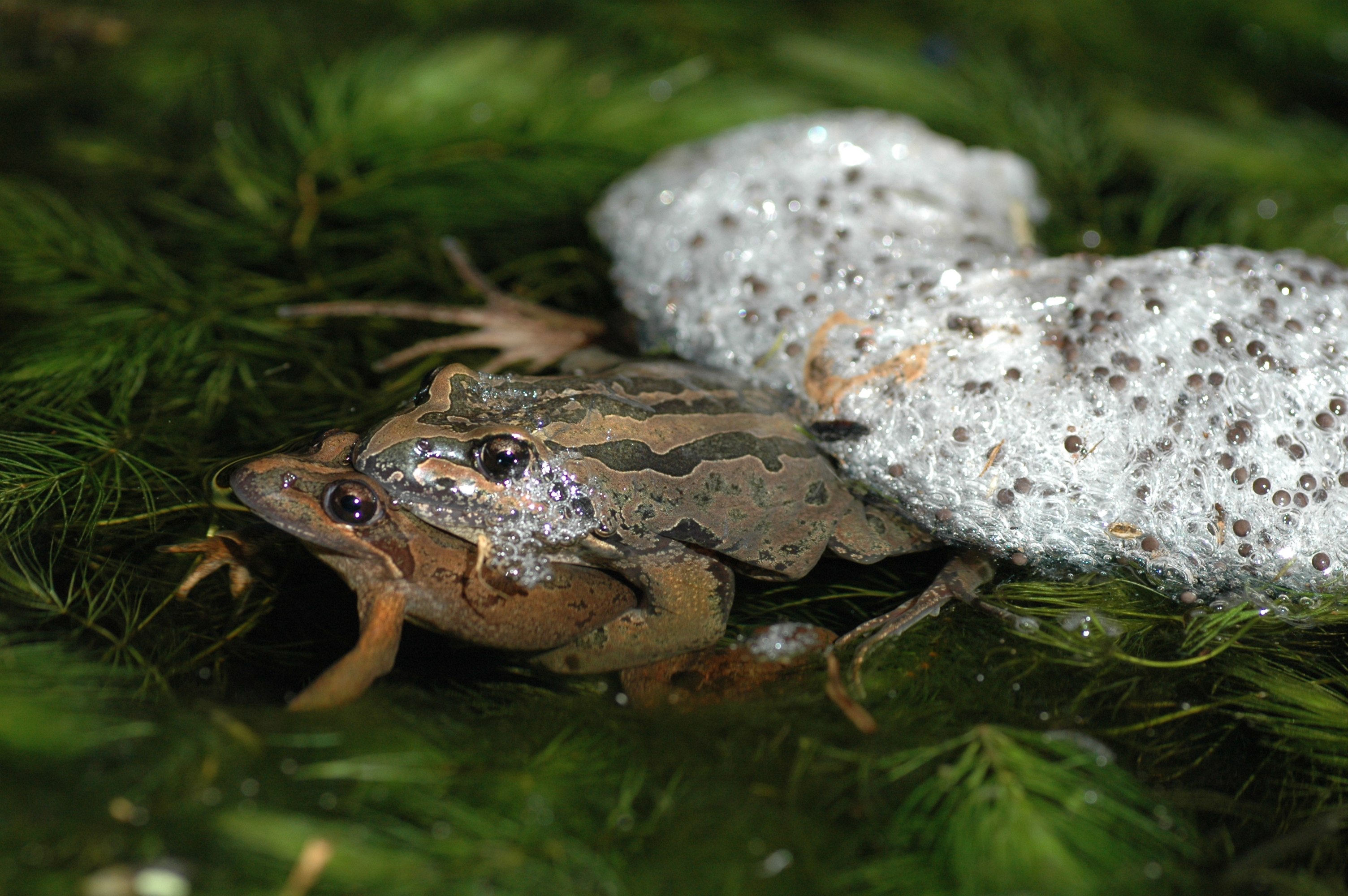
Striped marsh frog with spawn

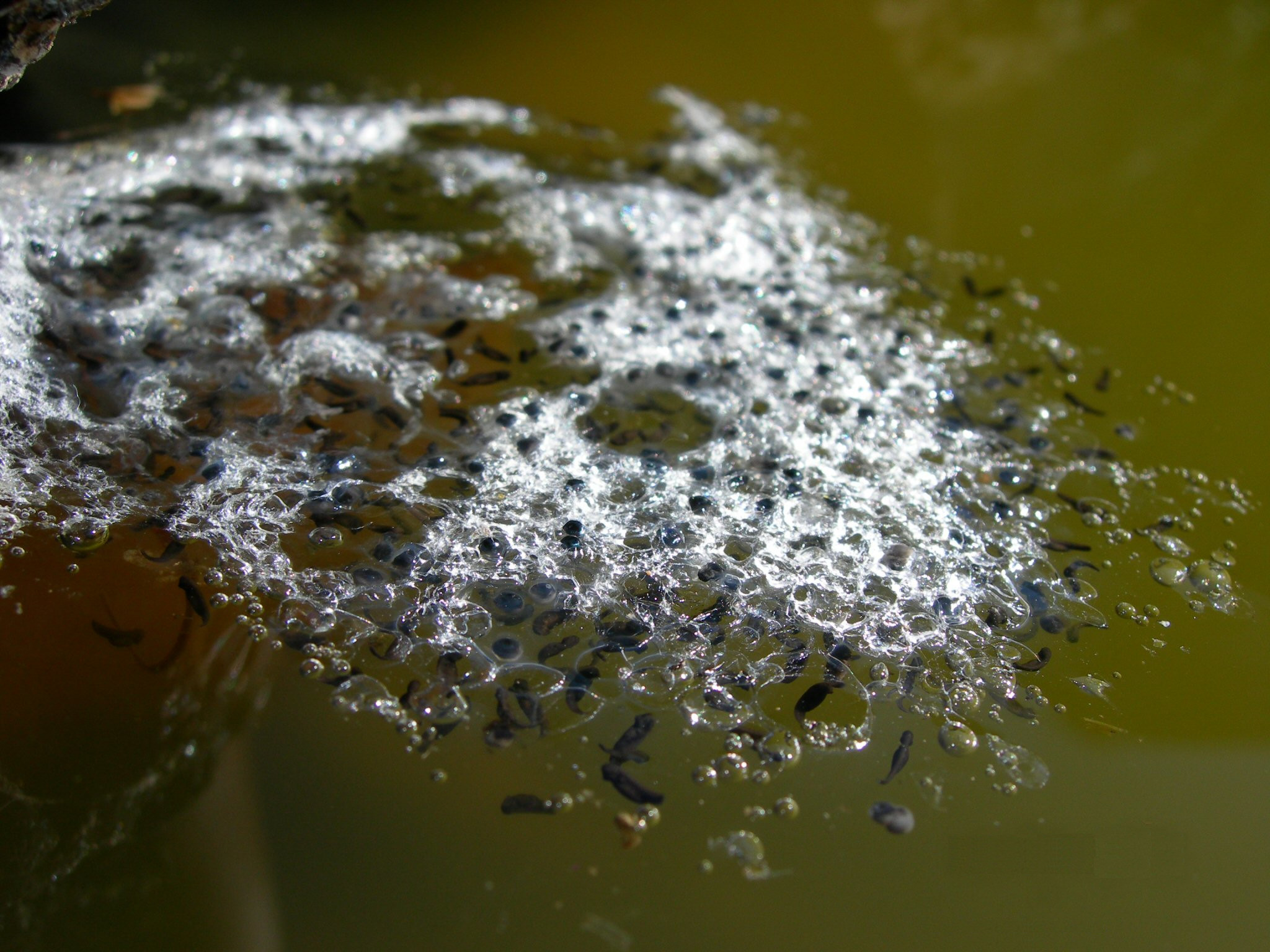
Striped marsh frog spawn in a garden pond in Melbourne

Limnodynastes peronii is the most frequently encountered frog on the east coast of Australia. It is normally the first frog to colonise a garden frog pond and is often a victim of backyard swimming pools. It will inhabit ponds, roadside ditches, creeks, dams, flooded areas and any other available water body. The natural prey of this species includes another local species of frog called Bibron's toadlet (Pseudophryne bibronii). The striped marsh frog is tolerant of polluted water. During all months of the year (particularly spring to autumn), males call while floating in water from a hidden area in vegetation, emitting a "knock" call resembling the sound of hitting a piece of timber with a hammer. This call is familiar to anyone in Sydney who has a garden pond.

Several studies have used the striped marsh frog to try to understand why worldwide amphibian declines are greater in montane regions. Researchers have found that negative effects of low temperatures and high ultraviolet-B (UVB) radiation on tadpole survival are greater when the two stressors are combined. UVB radiation decreased the survival of striped marsh frog tadpoles, but there was an increasingly large mortality rate when low temperatures were involved. UVB radiation caused DNA damage, and as the temperature decreased, the turnover time to repair DNA decreased, so the damage lasted longer.

== Reproduction ==
The breeding season of Limnodynastes peronii is from late winter to early spring. Eggs are laid in a foamy nest, and tadpoles can take 8–12 months to develop. The pale brown tadpoles can be up to 6.5 cm (2.6 in) long.

== Human interactions ==
In Australia Limnodynastes peronii may be kept in captivity with the appropriate permit. Also, the striped marsh frog often colonises garden ponds.

== Sources ==
- Anstis, M. 2002. Tadpoles of South-eastern Australia. Reed New Holland: Sydney.
- Robinson, M. 2002. A Field Guide to Frogs of Australia. Australian Museum/Reed New Holland: Sydney.
- Frogs of Australia
- Frog and Tadpole Study Group
- Department of Environment, Climate Change and Water, New South Wales: Amphibian Keeper's Licence: Species Lists
- Wildlife Victoria,keeping-and-trading-wildlife/private-wildlife-licences
