= List of convicts on the First Fleet =

1787 penal transportation to New South Wales

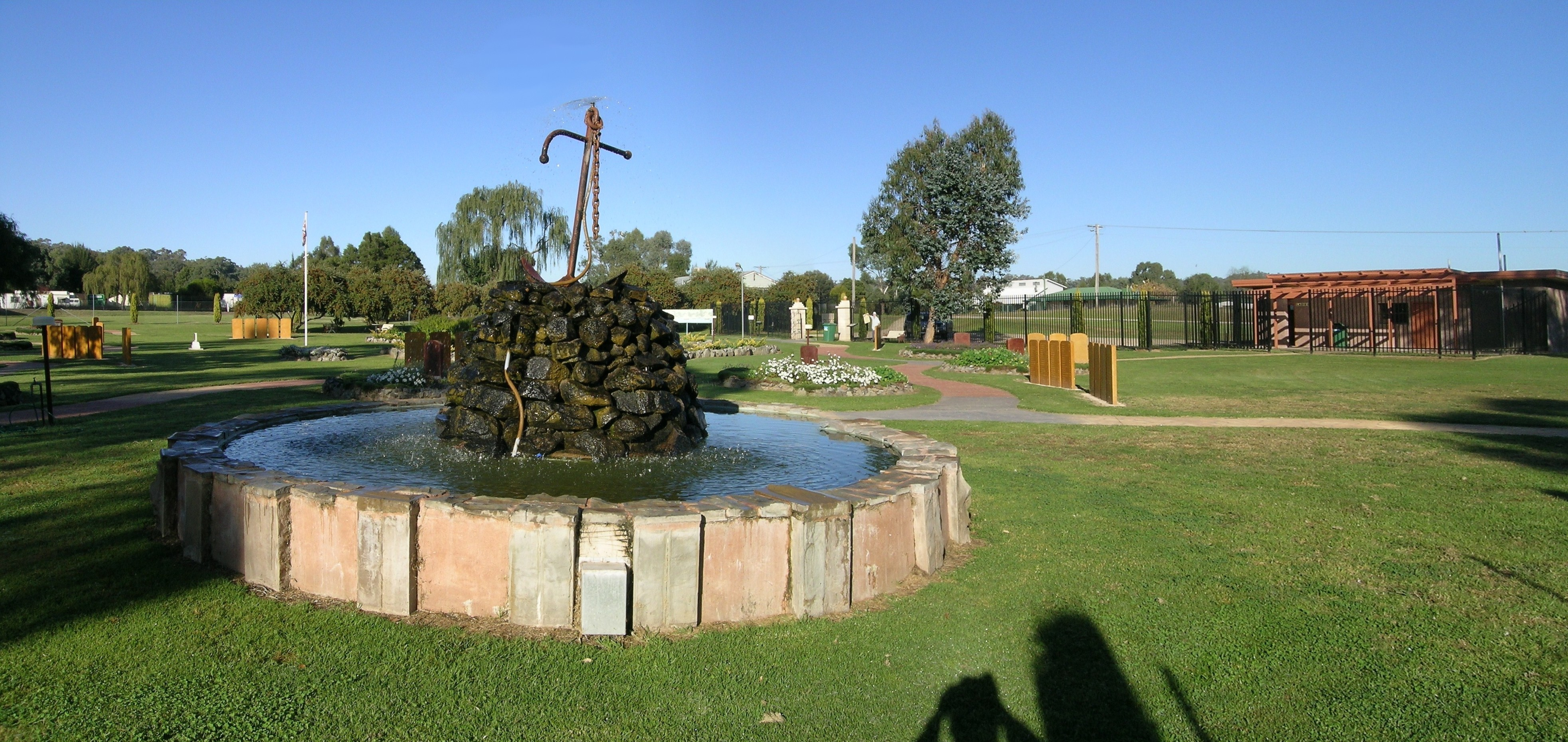
The First Fleet convicts are named on stone tablets in the Memorial Garden, Wallabadah, New South Wales.

The First Fleet is the name given to the group of eleven ships carrying convicts, the first to do so, that left England in May 1787 and arrived in Australia in January 1788. The ships departed with an estimated 775 convicts (582 men and 193 women), as well as officers, marines, their wives and children, and provisions and agricultural implements. After 43 convicts had died during the eight-month trip, 732 landed at Sydney Cove.

In 2005, the First Fleet Garden, a memorial to the First Fleet immigrants, friends and others was created on the banks of Quirindi Creek at Wallabadah, New South Wales. Stonemason Ray Collins researched and then carved the names of all those who came out to Australia on the eleven ships in 1788 on tablets along the garden pathways. The stories of those who arrived on the ships, their life, and first encounters with the Australian country are presented throughout the garden.

The six ships that transported the First Fleet convicts were:

- Alexander
- Charlotte
- Friendship
- Lady Penrhyn
- Prince of Wales
- Scarborough

No single definitive list of people who travelled on those ships exists; however, historians have pieced together as much data about these pioneers as possible. In the late 1980s, a simple software program with a database of convicts became available for Australian school students, both as a history and an information technology learning guide. An on-line version is now hosted by the University of Wollongong. Digitised images of the lists from the Orders in Council for the First Fleet are also available on-line at the Convict Indents Index.

The following list of persons is organized alphabetically by surname, with sections divided according to the initial letter.

== A ==
Name	Date of birth	Place of conviction	Date of conviction	Sentence	Other information	Transport ship
Mary Abel	c. 1757	Worcester	5 Mar 1785	7 years	Abel was convicted for stealing 3 Ells of hempen cloth, tablecloths, clothing & other items, value 31s, on 5 March 1785. Abel was a servant from Hanbury.On 25 November 1786, Abel was transferred from Worcester gaol to Southwark gaol in London. Abel was pregnant when she embarked and gave birth to a child, William on 13 April 1787. Mary married Thomas Tilley on 4 May 1788 at Sydney Cove. Her son died on 19 May 1788. On 21 July 1788, Abel died at Sydney Cove.	Lady Penrhyn
Robert Abel	c. 1772	London	15 Sep 1784	Death commuted to 7 years	Abel was convicted with another man at the Old Bailey for assault and highway robbery with a pistol that occurred on 4 July 1784, value 5s. Abel received the King's Pardon and sentenced was commuted. In June 1790, Abel received 200 lashes for stealing sugar from the Lady Juliana. In February 1794, Abel received a 30-acre land grant which he later sold. He left the Colony for India in 1795 on the Endeavour. The ship sank off New Zealand, and Abel was rescued and taken to Norfolk Island in January 1796. Abel did not remain on the island and there are no further records of him.	Alexander
Esther Abrahams	c. 1767	London	30 Aug 1786	7 years	Convicted at the Old Bailey for stealing twenty-four yards of black silk lace (50s). Listed as a Milliner by trade. Defended by William Garrow. Esther travelled with her baby daughter Rosanna. She became wife of Lt. Col. George Johnson. She was Jewish.	Prince of Wales
Henry Abrams	c. 1759	Chelmsford	9 Mar 1785	Death commuted to 7 years	Aka Abrahams. Convicted of Highway Robbery value 46s. Listed as a labourer by occupation.	Scarborough
Thomas Akers	c. 1757	Exeter	14 March 1785	Death, commuted to 7	a.k.a Acres. He was tried at Exeter, Devon on 14 March 1785 for assault and highway robbery with a value of 10 shillings.	Charlotte
John Adams	c. 1740	London	26 May 1784	7	Convicted at the Old Bailey (with John Ayners) for stealing 214lbs of lead (30s).	Scarborough
Mary Adams	c. 1758	London	13 December 1786	7	Convicted at the Old Bailey of stealing two cotton gowns (24s), one green sluff petticoat (3s), one white callico petticoat (12d), two shirts (5s), one shift (1s), one hat (2s), one ostrich feather (6s), one silver thimble (12d).	Lady Penrhyn
Charles Allen	c. 1767	London	7 July 1784	7	Convicted at the Old Bailey (with Peter Sampson) of burglarious breaking and entering a dwelling and stealing one linen sheet (10s), eight damask table cloths (40s), one sheet (10s), eight shirts (3s 1d) and one counterpane (10s).	Scarborough
John Allen	c. 1742	Hertford	3 Mar 1786	7	Allen was convicted for stealing bedding (200s). His occupation was listed as labourer or miller. He died in 1794.	Alexander
Mary Allen	c. 1765	London	25 Oct 1786	7	Convicted of stealing by highway robbery a watch with a tortoise-shell case (30s), a chain (2s), four gold seals (40s), a base metal watch key (2d).	Lady Penrhyn
Mary Allen	c. 1759	London	10 Jan 1787	7	Alias Conner. Convicted at the Old Bailey for stealing one man's hat (12s).	Lady Penrhyn
Susannah Allen	Unknown	London	18 Apr 1787	7	Convicted at the Old Bailey of stealing one dimity gown (15s), a cotton petticoat (6s), a silk cloak (5s), a muslin apron (7s), a pair of linen pockets (12s), a silk handkerchief (3s), a pair of base metal shoe-buckles (2s), a muslin handkerchief (2s), and a pair of thread stockings (6d).	Lady Penrhyn
Tamasin Allen	c. 1755	London	25 Oct 1786	7 years	Aka Jamasin, alias Boddington. Convicted at the Old Bailey of stealing one leather pocket-book (1s), ten grains of rose diamonds (£8), seven grains weight of other diamonds (£6), two brilliant diamonds (50s), a pearl (12s), one topaz (5s), a silver pencil-case (2s), and one promisory note called a bank note (£10). Known as a prostitute, described at her trial as "a lustyish woman with black hair."	Lady Penrhyn
William Allen	c. 1763	Ormskirk	11 Apr 1785	7 years	Allen, a labourer, was tried for assault and robbery (30s).	Alexander
Elizabeth Anderson	c. 1755	London	10 Jan 1787	7 years	Convicted at the Old Bailey (with Elizabeth Bruce) of stealing three linen table-cloths (15s) and two aprons (5s). Her occupation was listed as servant. She left New South Wales in 1799.	Lady Penrhyn
Fanny Anderson	c. 1757	Winchester	7 Mar 1786	7 years	Aka Frances. Anderson, a dealer, was tried for stealing clothing and money (13s). She was described in the colony as "too fond of spirituous liquors to be very industrious". She married Simon Burn on 10 February 1788.	Charlotte
John Anderson	c. 1761	Exeter	20 Mar 1786	7 years	He was tried at Exeter, Devon on 20 March 1786 for stealing linen with a value of 146 shillings. His occupation was listed as seaman. A report from Dunkirk hulk described him as "tolerably decent and orderly". On 14 December 1789 he received 200 lashes for robbing a garden. He was a Nightwatch member by 1791, and married Elizabeth Bruce on 16 March 1788.	Charlotte
John Anderson	c. 1763	London	26 May 1784	7 years	Convicted at the Old Bailey of stealing three linen table cloths (20s) and three linen aprons (6s). He died in 1816 after he was murdered by his wife.	Scarborough
John Archer	c. 1756	London	26 May 1784	7 years	Alias Forrester. Convicted at the Old Bailey of stealing two large coach glasses (40s).	Scarborough
John Arscott	c. 1767	Bodmin	18 Aug 1783	7 years	Arscott was tried for stealing tobacco (70s). Report from Dunkirk hulk was that he had behaved "tolerably well". Married Catherine Prior on 8 December 1792. He left NSW in 1793.	Scarborough
George Atkinson	c. 1765	London	21 Apr 1784	7 years	Aka Atkins. He was tried at Old Bailey for stealing one cloth coat (5s), one black silk waistcoat (2s), one stuff waistcoat (1s), four pair of breeches (2s), four shirts (2s), one pair of shoes (3s), one pair of stockings (1s), two handkerchiefs (1s), and one printed book (6d). He was a night watch member and died in 1834.	Scarborough
Sarah Ault	Unknown	London	21 Feb 1787	7 years	Convicted at the Old Bailey (with Elizabeth Scott) for stealing four bridles (11s), one bradoon (2s), two strap irons (1s), and two leather straps (1s).	Prince of Wales
John Ayners	c. 1760	London	26 May 1784	7 years	Alias Agnew. Convicted at the Old Bailey (with John Adams) for stealing 214lbs of lead (30s).	Scarborough

== B ==
Name	Date of birth	Place of conviction	Date of conviction	Sentence	Other information	Transport ship
Robert Bails	c. 1766	Reading	28 February 1785	Death commuted to 14	For more information see here	Alexander
Martha Baker	c. 1762	London	30 August 1786	7	For more information see here	Lady Penrhyn
Charles Mudie	c. 1764	Exeter	10 January 1786	7	Baker was convicted at Exeter for an unrecorded crime which resulted in him receiving 7 years transportation. A report from the Dunkirk Hulk described Thomas as "troublesome at times." Baker died between 1788 and September 1792.	Charlotte
James Balding	c. 1755	London	12 January 1785	Death commuted to 7	a.k.a. William and Baldwin	Scarborough
Ruth Baldwin	c. 1762	London	25 October 1786	7	alias Bowyer. Convicted at the Old Bailey of stealing three table spoons (20s) and two silver dessert spoons (10s).	Prince of Wales
John Ball	c. 1736	Exeter	20 March 1786	7	Ball was tried at Exeter, Devon on 20 March 1786 for stealing livestock (a sheep) with a value of 10 shillings. A report from Dunkirk hulk was "tolerably decent and orderly". He died in 1788.	Charlotte
George Bannister	c. 1768	London	21 April 1784	7	About 16 years old when convicted. Tried at the Old Bailey (with George Robinson and John Monroe alias Nurse) for stealing one marcella petticoat (8s), one child's dimity cloak (3s), one linen gown (1s 6d) and one pair of cotton stockings (6d) on 21 April 1784.	Alexander
Elizabeth Barber	c. 1755	London	16 October 1782	Death, commuted to 7 years	Became wife of Thomas Brown; Charlotte	Friendship
John Barferd	c. 1767	London	14 December 1785	7	aka Barford. Convicted at the Old Bailey (with John Cropper) of stealing one hair trunk (12d), four silk gowns (40s), one silk apron (2s), six linen ruffled shirts (30s), one plain linen ditto (3s), six stocks (6s), a silk cloak trimmed with fur (5s), two linen gowns (20s), one petticoat (4s), six children's night-gowns (5s), a yard of printed cotton (12d) two linen table-cloths (10s), one child's linen clout (12d), one silk petticoat (5s), a counterpane (10s), six pillow-cases (12d), a pair of stays (4s), one box iron (12d), a pair of steel snuffers (12d), a snuffer-stand (6d), a blanket (6d), six yards of silk ribbon (12d), one gauze cap (1d).	Alexander
George Barland	c. 1767	London	7 July 1784	7	Convicted at the Old Bailey (with James Burleigh) for stealing one cloth great coat (20s).	Scarborough
Stephen Barnes	c. 1765	York	9 July 1785	7	For more information see here	Alexander
Henry Barnett	c. 1744	Warwick	21 March 1785	Death commuted to 7	aka Barnard, alias Burton	Alexander
Daniel Barret	c. 1757	Winchester	29 July 1783	7	aka Barrett, Barnett, Barney	Friendship
Thomas Barrett	c. 1758	London	11 September 1782	Life	Barrett was convicted at the Old Bailey for stealing one silver watch (£3), one steel chain (3s), one stone seal (6d), one metal watch key (1d), one hook (1d), two shirts (8s), one shift (1s). His sentence was commuted from death to transportation to America for life. In March 1784, Thomas was sent aboard the Mercury bound for Nova Scotia. Barrett was a ringleader in the Mercury Mutiny in April 1784. He was recaptured and sentenced to death, but since he had intervened to save the steward's life and prevented injury to the Captain, he was reprieved and given transportation for life. On the voyage to New South Wales, Barrett was involved in passing counterfeit coin made from some pewter spoons and old buttons and buckles belonging to marines at Rio de Janeiro. John White asked Barrett to make a memento of the trip, and Barrett fashioned a medal out of a silver kidney dish. The Charlotte Medal (the first work of Australian Colonial art) was sold at auction to the Australian National Maritime Museum in 2008 for one million dollars. In February 1788 Barrett was hanged for stealing beef and peas. He was the first man executed by hanging in New South Wales.	Charlotte
John Barry	c. 1768	Bristol	23 November 1785	7	About 17-18 yrs old when convicted.	Friendship
George Barsby		Winchester	1 March 1785	Death commuted to life	Barsby was tried at Winchester, Hampshire on 1 March 1785 for assault and highway robbery with a value of 228 shillings. He was sentenced to transportation for life having been originally sentenced to death. He died in Portsmouth Harbour in 1787 before the fleet sailed.	Scarborough
Samuel Barsby	c. 1764	Exeter	20 March 1786	Death commuted to 7	Barsby was tried at Exeter, Devon on 20 March 1786 for stealing material with a value of 40 shillings. He was sentenced to transportation for 7 years having been originally sentenced to death. He was tried alongside Samuel Pigott for the same crime. He was flogged several times. First, on 11 February 1788 he was sentenced to receive 150 lashes for abuse and striking Marines. Secondly, he was sentenced to 50 lashes for threatening Catherine Prior, and again in January and March 1789 for insolence and drunkenness.	Charlotte
James Bartlett		Winchester	1 March 1785	7	Pardoned & released before 1st fleet departed	
Elizabeth Bason	c. 1757	Salisbury	24 July 1784	Death commuted to 7	Bason was tried at Salisbury, Wiltshire on 24 July 1784 for stealing material with a value of 16 shillings. She was sentenced to transportation for 7 years having been originally sentenced to death. She became wife of James Heatherly, crew of Sirius. They had three children and left for India.	Charlotte
Oten Batley	c.1764	London	10 December 1783	7	Batley was convicted of stealing one silver watch (40s), one silver seal (1s), and one steel chain (6d). He had previously been convicted at the Old Bailey for stealing one silk handkerchief (2s) on 30 May 1781, and for stealing a silk handkerchief (1s) on 23 July 1783. He took part in the mutiny aboard the Mercury in 1784 and was subsequently additionally found guilty of return from transportation.	Charlotte
Walter Batley	c. 1760	London	29 October 1783	7	aka Walton. Alias John Rous/Rouse/Rowse. Became husband of Martha Baker.	Friendship
James Bayley		New Sarum		7		Charlotte
John Bazley		Exeter		7		
Ann Beardsley		Derby		5		Friendship then from Rio; Charlotte
Elizabeth Beckford	c.1710	London	10 January 1787	7	Beckford was convicted at the Old Bailey of stealing 12lbs of Gloucester cheese. She was estimated to be approximately 70 years of age when the fleet sailed. She died of dropsy on 12 July as the Fleet neared the equator.	Lady Penrhyn
William Bell		London		7		Scarborough
Sarah Bellamy		Worcester	9 July 1785	7	married James Bloodsworth	Lady Penrhyn
Jacob Bellet		London		7		Scarborough
Samuel Benear		London		7		
John Best		London		7		Friendship
Elizabeth Bingham		London			alias MOORING	
Elizabeth Bird		Maidstone		7	alias WINIFRED	
James Bird		Croydon		7		
Samuel Bird		Croydon		7		
Joseph Bishop		London	10 December 1783	7	Convicted at the Old Bailey of stealing five silk handkerchiefs (12s), a cotton handkerchief (2s), one linen handkerchief (12d).	Friendship
John Baughan		Oxford		7	aka Baughn, Bingham, Boughan, Bunham. Alias Baffen, Boffin, Buffin	Friendship
William Blackhall		Abingdon		7		
Francis Blake		London	26 May 1784	7	Convicted at the Old Bailey of stealing nine linen shirts (18s), two pair of silk stockings (4s), four handkerchiefs (2s), two pair of ruffles (12d), eight oz. weight of chocolate (2d) and six muslin neckcloths (20s). Total value 39s. The prosecution was led by William Garrow.	
Susannah Blanchett		Kingston		7		
William Blatherhorn		Exeter/London	10 September 1783	Death commuted Life	aka Beans, Fisher. Originally convicted in the Old Bailey for stealing six yards of printed cotton (12s), five yards of other printed cotton (14s), twelve cotton handkerchiefs (24s), he was sentenced to be transported for 7 years on 26 February 1783. He was part of a group of 24 convicts lead principally by John Kellan which overthrew their transportation vessel bound for America, the Swift and returned to Britain. He was tried at the Old Bailey for returning from transportation and sentenced to death by hanging. The King, however, thought fit to extend his mercy upon them and commute their sentences to transportation for life on 10 September 1783.	Charlotte
James Bloodsworth	7 March 1759	Kingstone	3 October 1785	7	aka Bloedworth, Bloodworth. Bloodsworth was sentenced to 7 years for the theft of one game cock and two hens. After his sentence was served, Bloodsworth was a master bricklayer and builder responsible for the construction of most of the buildings in the colony of New South Wales between 1788 and 1800. He was offered rehabilitation to England, but he refused. In 1803 when offered a choice of employment at Port Phillip or the Derwent he again refused, preferring to remain in Sydney. He died from pneumonia in 1804.	Charlotte
William Blunt		London	10 December 1783	7	Convicted at the Old Bailey alongside a man named John Berryman for breaking and entering a dwelling house with intent to burglariously steal goods, chattels and monies. During the trial Blunt mentions that he is a coachman by trade and his father, also named William, is among those giving him a reference to good character. Originally both were sentenced to death. However, this was later overturned to seven years transportation for both those convicted.	
William Boggis	c. 1767	Kingston upon Thames	24 Mar 1784	7	For more information see here	Scarborough
Mary Bolton		Shrewsbury	12 Mar 1785	To be hanged. Commuted to 7 years transportation	aka Mary Boulton. She became the wife of Samuel Day.	Lady Penrhyn
Jane Bonner		London	18 April 1787	7	Convicted at the Old Bailey of stealing one black silk cloak (21s).	
Peter Bond		London	15 September 1784	7	Although a transcript of Bond's trial does not exist, the Old Bailey Punishment Summaries note that he was tried there on 15 September 1784 and sentenced to seven years transportation.	
William Bond		Exeter		7		Charlotte
Rebecca Boulton		Lincoln		7	aka Bolton. Had been in prison for 4 years before the fleet sailed. Considered both mentally ill and in poor physical condition.	Prince of Wales
John Boyle		London	21 April 1784	7	Convicted at the Old Bailey of fraud. Boyle, a seaman of the Royal Navy adopted the name of his former fellow seaman John Frazier upon returning home in order to obtain his wages. Upon the Navy Clerk stating that Frazier was listed as dead in the Americas, Boyle persisted to adopt several other identities in order to obtain wages that were not his. His story was disproved by three of his former shipmates present at the trial. Boyle had served with Frazier on board H.M.S. Marlborough and finally on board H.M.S. L'Hector, a captured French vessel. Originally sentenced to death, this sentence was commuted to seven years transportation on 23 February 1785.	
William Bradbury		London	10 September 1783	7	Originally sentenced to 7 years transportation to America at the Old Bailey for stealing a Bank post-bill, for £20 a bank-note for £10 another note for £5 5s the said notes being the property of John Baring and Company on 3 July 1782. He was part of a group of 24 convicts lead principally by John Kellan which overthrew their transportation vessel bound for America, the Swift and returned to Britain. He was tried at the Old Bailey for returning from transportation and sentenced to death by hanging. The King, however, thought fit to extend his mercy upon them and commute their sentences to transportation for life on 10 September 1783.	
John Bradford		Exeter		7		Charlotte
James Bradley	9 January 1765	London	29 June 1785	7	James Edward Bradley was found guilty on 29 June 1785 at the Old Bailey, London, of stealing a white linen handkerchief worth two shillings. Sentenced to seven years transportation he was sent to the Ceres hulk. He arrived in Sydney in January 1788 aboard the Scarborough as part of the First Fleet. On 23 February 1789 Bradley received 25 lashes for insolence to a sentinel. He married fellow convict Sarah Barnes on 12 August 1792 at Parramatta. In early 1794 he was granted 30 acres of land at the Eastern Farms. By 1802 the family was able to live 'off stores'. He was buried on 16 February 1838; his age was given as 64.	Scarborough
Curtis Brand		Maidstone		7	alias Bryn	Friendship
Lucy Brand		London	19 July 1786	7	alias Wood. Previously convicted at the Old Bailey of stealing by pickpocketing one piece of silver coin, called half a crown, and five shillings and sixpence on 11 May 1785 for which she was sentenced to privately whipped and imprisoned for one year. She was convicted and sentenced to seven years transportation at the Old Bailey approximately fourteen months later for stealing one gold ring (5s), three guineas (£3 3s) and two pieces of base metal (2d).	
Mary Branham		London	23 February 1785	7	Although a transcription of Branham's trial at the Old Bailey is not listed, her sentence is listed in the Old Bailey Punishment Summaries for 23 February 1785.	
James Brannegan		Exeter		7	aka Branagan	Charlotte
William Brewer		Exeter		7		Charlotte
William Brice		Bristol		7		
John Brindley		Warwick		7		
Mary Broad		Exeter		7	aka Braund or Brand. Pregnant when boarded ship and a daughter was born on voyage. Broad became the wife of William Bryant and they had a son. She and a group a convicts managed to escape the colony and returned to England.	Charlotte
William Brough		Stafford		7		
James Brown		Hertford		7		
Richard Brown		Reading		7		
Thomas Brown		London	30 April 1783	7	Convicted at the Old Bailey (with Joseph Dunnage) for stealing one chariot glass door (22s).	
Thomas Brown	c. 1762	Exeter	29 Oct 1783	7	Became husband of Elizabeth Barber	Charlotte
William Brown		Southwark		7		
William Brown		Exeter		7	died at sea, 19 September 1787	Charlotte
Elizabeth Bruce		London	10 January 1787	7	Convicted at the Old Bailey (with Elizabeth Anderson) of stealing three linen table-cloths (15s) and two aprons (5s).	
Robert Bruce		Exeter		7		Charlotte
John Bryant		Exeter		7		Charlotte
Michael Bryant		London	10 December 1783	14	Convicted at the Old Bailey of stealing one black cloth coat (5s), one striped silk waistcoat (2s 6d), one velvet waistcoat (2s 6d), one pair of cloth breeches (2s 6d), one pair of fustain breeches (2s 6d), one hat (1s), one handkerchief (9d), and three pair of stockings (1s 6d).	Friendship
Thomas Bryant		Maidstone		7		
William Bryant		Launceston		7		Charlotte
Joseph Buckley	c. 1748	Dorchester	16 March 1786	7	For more information see here	Charlotte
John Bufley						
Margaret Bunn	c. 1762	London	26 April 1786	7	For more information see here	Lady Penrhyn
Sarah Burdo	c. 1764	London	25 October 1786.	7	aka Burdoe/Bordeaux. Convicted at the Old Bailey (with Rebecca Davidson) of stealing three guineas (£3 3s) and one half guinea (10s 6d). Burdo was alluded to being a prostitute during the trial. Her occupation was listed as dressmaker. She died in 1834 in Sydney, NSW.	Lady Penrhyn
Mary Burkitt	c. 1757	London	30 August 1786	7	For more information see here	Lady Penrhyn
James Burleigh		London	7 July 1784	7	Convicted at the Old Bailey (with George Barland) for stealing one cloth great coat (20s).	
Patrick Burn						
Peter Burn		London	10 September 1783	7	No mention of Peter Burn, but a Peter Bourne was tried at the Old Bailey for stealing one large wooden cask bound with iron hoops (10s), and thirty-six gallons of porter (30s).	
Simon Burn						
James Burne		London	21 April 1784	Death commuted to 7	Originally sentenced to death at the Old Bailey for assault and stealing by highway robbery one black silk bonnet (4s), and one silver hat pin (4d) on 25 February 1784. His sentence was commuted to 7 years transportation on 21 April 1784.	
Samuel Burridge		Dorchester		7		Charlotte
William Butler		London	7 July 1784	7	Convicted at the Old Bailey (with Andrew Goodwin) of stealing 200lbs of lead (20s).	

== C ==
Name	Date of birth	Place of conviction	Date of conviction	Sentence	Other information	Transport ship
John Caesar	c. 1763	Maidstone		7	The first Australian bushranger and one of the first people of recent African descent to arrive in Australia.	Alexander
James Campbell		London		Death commuted to 7	alias George Campbell. Convicted of highway robbery in 1784. Death sentence commuted to transportation for 7 years.	Scarborough
James Campbell		Guildford		7		
Ann Carey		Taunton		7		Charlotte
Mary Carroll	c. 1751	London	25 Oct 1786	7	Carroll married John Nicholls in Sydney March 1788. Lived with William Thompson on Norfolk Island.	Lady Penrhyn
Richard Carter		Shrewsbury			alias Cartwright	
John Carney		Exeter		7		
Francis Carty		Bodmin		7		
Joseph Carver		Maidstone		7		
James Castle		London		7		
William Chaaf		Exeter		7		Charlotte
Thomas Chaddick		London		7		
Edward Chanin		Exeter		7	Died at sea on 8 Jan 1788	Charlotte
William Chields						
Samuel Chinery		Exeter		7		Charlotte
William Church		Dorchester		7		Charlotte
Elizabeth Clark	c.1766	Derby	11 Jan 1785	7	Clark was convicted at the Derby Assizes of stealing clothing (value 6s and 6d). Clark was sent to the Dunkirk hulk two days later and was discharged to the Friendship in March 1787. Transferred to the Prince of Wales at the Cape of Good Hope in August 1787. In May 1788, Clark was charged at Sydney Cove of abusing Private William Norris while in a state of intoxication. She was sentenced to be tied to a cart's tail and flogged publicly once up and down the women's camp, on the western side of the cove. The case was re-opened and the sentence was countermanded after it was learnt that the two had been intimate on the Friendship, and that Norris had struck her, calling her a whore. She died on 4 September 1788 aged approximately 22.	Friendship
James Clark	c.1753	London	6 Apr 1786	7	alias Hosier. Clark was convicted at the Old Bailey in London of stealing a silver watch (value 40s), a steel watch chain (value 5s) and two seals (value 2s each). He had been a butcher, and claimed at his trial that he had been "wounded in the action of Inigo Jones", and had a pension that he had used to go into business with his sister on Grub Street. Clark was held on the Ceres hulk before being transported to New South Wales. Clark worked at the governor's farm in 1789. In March 1790 he was sent (as James Clark) to Norfolk Island on the Sirius. By July 1791 he was living with Susannah Huffnell and her daughter Elizabeth on a Sydney Town lot. It is possible that he is the Charles Clark who lived with Mary Lammerman on a four-acre lot at Queenborough in June 1794. He departed with Mary for Van Diemen's Land on the Porpoise in 1807. In the 1811 Muster he was listed as Charles Clark, living at Hobart. By 1822 he was back in New South Wales, as Charles Clark, employed by W. Broughton at Appin. In 1828 he was working as a servant for Elizabeth Peisley. No further records have been located for him after 1828.	Scarborough
William Clarke	c.1764	London	14 Jan 1784	7	Clarke was convicted at the Old Bailey of having stolen one wooden cask (value 6d) and five gallons of raspberry brandy (value 22s) from the King of Prussia pub on Saltpetre Bank (now Dock Street, Whitechapel). Clarke was originally sentenced to death but had his sentence commuted to transportation for 7 years at some point. He was sent to the Censor hulk in August 1784. Clarke was sent to Norfolk Island on the Supply in February 1789. He may have been the William Clarke who received 50 lashes for neglect of duty in June 1790. In July 1791 he was subsisting two people on a Sydney Town lot. He married Sarah Cumberland in a mass wedding ceremony on the island in November 1791. In 1794 he was hired as a labourer for six months by Stephen Martin. Clarke left Norfolk Island (alone) for Van Diemen's Land (Tasmania) on the Porpoise in December 1807, settling on a 31-acre lot at New Norfolk. He died on 15 October 1822 at Richmond; his age was given as 52. He died "a very infirm old man" as a result of "excessive drinking of spirits".	Scarborough
John Clarke	Unknown	Exeter	7 Aug 1786	7	Clarke was convicted at Exeter for stealing livestock (two lambs) and mutton with a value of 14 shillings. He was sentenced to transportation for 7 years having been originally sentenced to death. He died on 6 June 1787 at sea.	Charlotte
George Clear						
Mary Cleaver		Bristol		7	Son, James, born on voyage in 1787.	Charlotte
Thomas Clements		London		7		
Richard Clough		Durham		7		
John Coffin		Exeter		7		Charlotte
Elizabeth Cole	1758	Exeter	20 Mar 1786	7	For more information see here	Charlotte
Elizabeth Cole		London		7		
William Cole		London		7		
Elizabeth Colley		London		14		
Richard Collier		Kingstone		7		
Joseph Colling		London		7		
Ishmael Colman		Dorchester		7	Died at sea on 29 May 1787	Charlotte
Ann Colpitts		Durham		7		
Ann Coombes	c. 1760	Taunton, Somerset	30 Mar 1786	7	Became wife of John Bryant. Lived with James Bryan Cullen.	Charlotte
Cornelius Conelly		Exeter		7		
William Connelly		Bristol		7		
William Connolly		Bodmin		7		
COOK, ?		London		7		
Mary Cooper		Worcester		7		
James Copp		Exeter		7		Charlotte
James Corden		Warwick		7		
Edward Cormick		Hertford		7		
James Cox						Charlotte
John Matthew Cox		London	7 July 1784	7	aka Banbury Jack. Convicted at the Old Bailey (with John Pontie) of stealing thirteen yards of lace (£5). He alluded to being a sailor during his trial. Originally sentenced to death, overturned to transportation for life on 23 February 1785.	
Taylor Crabtree		New Sarum		7		
John Creamer		Exeter		7		Charlotte
Jane Creek		London	1785	7	For more information see here	Lady Penrhyn
John Cropper		London	14 Dec 1785	7	Convicted at the Old Bailey (with John Barferd) of stealing one hair trunk (12d), four silk gowns (40s), one silk apron (2s), six linen ruffled shirts (30s), one plain linen ditto (3s), six stocks (6s), a silk cloak trimmed with fur (5s), two linen gowns (20s), one petticoat (4s), six children's night-gowns (5s), a yard of printed cotton (12d) two linen table-cloths (10s), one child's linen clout (12d), one silk petticoat (5s), a counterpane (10s), six pillow-cases (12d) a pair of stays (4s), one box iron (12d), a pair of steel snuffers (12d) a snuffer-stand (6d), a blanket (6d), six yards of silk ribbon (12d), one gauze cap (1d).	
William Cross		Coventry		7		
Thomas Restell Crowder	c. 1758	London	4 Dec 1782	Death commuted to Life	aka Thomas Ristol Crowder. Became husband of Sarah Davies.	Alexander
William Cuckow						
Jacob Cudlip		Bodmin		7	alias Norris	
James Bryan Cullen	c. 1742	London	6 Apr 1785	7	Lived with Ann Coombes.	Scarborough
John Cullyhorn		Exeter		7		
Edward Cunningham		London		7		
John Cuss		New Sarum		7	alias Hunsboy	Charlotte

== D ==
Name	Date of birth	Place of conviction	Date of conviction	Sentence	Other information	Transport ship
Richard Day		Reading		7		
Edward Davies		Stafford		7		
Samuel Day		Gloucester	23 March 1785	To be hanged. Commuted to 14 years transportation.	Married Mary Bolton/Boulton 2 Nov 1788, who was incorrectly recorded as Mary Bishop. There was no Mary Bishop in the First Fleet. However, Mary Davies/Davis formed a liaison with Thomas Bishop, Marine, prior to this marriage. As both she and Bolton were tried at the same place, on the same day, received identical sentences for similar crimes and travelled on the same ship, this mis-identification is the only logical explanation for a marriage characterised by Mollie Gillen as a "considerable complication" and a "mystery"	Alexander
Samuel Davis		Glocester		7		
William Davis						
James Davis		London	8 Dec 1784	7	For more information see here	Scarborough
Daniel Daniels		London		7	Convicted at the Old Bailey of stealing from Joseph Solomons on 21 May 1784 one copper pot with a copper cover (4s), one pewter dish (6d), one pewter porringer (3d), and one pair of shoes (6d). Daniels received 32 lashes for theft of flour in May 1791.	
Richard Dick		London		7		
John Davidson		London		Death commuted to 7	Convicted at the Old Bailey of burglary from Jane Box; one black bombazeen gown and petticoat (5s), one silk cloak (6s), one shift body (3d), four pair of linen sleeves (1s), two linen aprons (2s), two check aprons (6d), three laced caps (3s), one silver tea spoon, (1s), one muslin shawl (1s), one silk handkerchief (3s), one black silk apron (1s). Stealing from James Barkley; one linen stock (6d), two linen table cloths (10s), one silver table spoon (4s), one cotton bed gown (1s), one shaul (1s), and one linen apron (1s). Stealing from Eleanor Clegg, (with Benjamin Barlow, aged ten years, and Daniel Love, both acquitted) two linen aprons (6d) on 25 February 1784. The sentence of death was commuted to 7 years transportation on 23 February 1785.	Scarborough
William Davis		Brecon		Life		
Richard Davis						
Ann Daley		Nether Knutsfo		7	Mrs Gore Daley	
Margaret Darnell(Darnel)		London		7	Convicted 18 April 1787 - Married Owen Cavanough - Seaman on the "Sirus"	Prince of Wales
Ann Davis		London		7	First woman to be legally executed in New South Wales, on 23 November 1789	Lady Penrhyn
Elizabeth Dalton		London		7		Lady Penrhyn
Rebecca Davidson		London		7	Mrs Robert Davidson was convicted at the Old Bailey (with Sarah Burdo) of stealing three guineas (£3 3s) and one half guinea (10s 6d).	
Margaret Dawson	c. 1770	London		7	De facto relationship with William Balmain.	Lady Penhryn
Frances Davis		Chelmsford		14		
Sarah Davies		Worcester		7	aka DAVIS. Became wife of Thomas Crowder.	Lady Penrhyn
Mary Davies	c. 1752	Shrewsbury	12 Mar 1785	To be hanged: commuted to 7 years transportation.	aka Davis. Became wife of Thomas Bishop (FF Marine)	Lady Penrhyn
Michael Dennison		Poole		7		
Barnaby Denison		Bristol		7		
Patrick Delany						
Mary Dickenson		Southwark		7	For more information see here	Lady Penrhyn
Thomas Dickson		Durham		7	alias Ralph RAW	
Timothy Discall		Bodmin		7		
Mary Dixon		London		7		
William Douglas	c. 1763	Lincoln	9 Jul 1785	7	Married Mary Groves of the Prince of Wales on 1 June 1788.	Alexander
Ferdinand Dowland		London		7		
James Dodding					aka DORING	
William Dring		Kingston upon		7		
Joseph Dunnage		London		7 years commuted to Life	Convicted at the Old Bailey (with Thomas Brown) for stealing one chariot glass door (22s) on 30 April 1783 to seven years' transportation. This sentence was later commuted to transportation for life on 21 April 1784 for reasons currently undiscovered.	
Elizabeth Dudgens		London		7	aka Dudgeon. Convicted at the Old Bailey (with Susannah Garth) for stealing by pickpocketing nine guineas, value £9 9s and one half-guinea, value 10s and 6 pence in monies on 10 September 1783.	Friendship then from Cape; Charlotte
Jane Dundass		London		7		
Ann Dutton		London		7		
Leonard Deyer		Southwark		7		
Mary Dykes		London		7		

== E ==
Name	Date of birth	Place of conviction	Date of conviction	Sentence	Other information	Transport ship
William Earle		New Sarum		7		
Rachel Early		Reading		7	for stealing ribbon, tobacco and sugar valued at 3 shillings	transported on the Friendship
Martha Eaton						
Mary Eaton					alias Shepherd	
Thomas Eccles		Guildford		Life		
William Edmunds		Monmouth		7		
William Edwards		Westminster		7		
George Eggleston		Maidstone		7		
William Eggleton		Kingston		7	aka Eagleton, alias Bones, married Mary Dickenson on 17 February 1788; Mary died in 1799 leaving Eggleton with 3 children to raise. For more information see here.	Alexander
Deborah Elam		Chester		7		
Peter Ellam		Ormskirk		7		
Joseph Elliot		Croydon		7		
William Elliot		Croydon		7		
Nicholas English		London		7		
Elizabeth Evans		London		7		
William Evans		Shrewsbury		7		
John Everett		Hertford		7		
Matthew Everingham		London		7	Shortly before his conviction he was employed as a 'servant' by an attorney of the Middle Temple, hence the subsequent references to him as 'attorney's clerk'. Allegedly 'in great distress' he had obtained two books by false pretences from the servant of another attorney, and these he had offered for sale. Later married Elizabeth Rymes of London who arrived on the Neptune 1790.	Scarborough

== F ==
Name	Date of birth	Place of conviction	Date of conviction	Sentence	Other information	Transport ship
William Farley		Bristol		7		
Ann Farmer		London				
Phillip Farrell		London		7		
Benjamin Fentum		London		7		
John Ferguson		Exeter		7		Charlotte
Thomas Fillesey		Bristol		7		
Jane Fitzgerald		London		7	alias Phillips	Charlotte
William Field						
John Finlow					alias Hervey	
Jane Field		London				
Elizabeth Fitzgerald		London		7		
Edward Flyn						
Phebe Flarty		London		7	Flarty and Ann Parsley were convicted for stealing three muslin shawls (30s) from Robert Hincksman in Holborn.	
Francis Fowkes		London		7		
Robert Forrester		London		7		
William Foyle		New Sarum		7		Charlotte
Ann Fowles		London	16 April 1785	7	For more information see here	Lady Penrhyn
Margaret Fownes		Shrewsbury		7		Lady Penrith
Ann Forbes		Kingston	29 April 1787	7	Tried on the 29th day of April 1787. Ten yards of printed cotton of the value of 20 shillings, of the goods and chattles of James Rollinson in the shop of said James Rollinson, feloniously did steal take and carry away. Guilty, no chattels to be hanged – Reprieved, Transported 7 years. Sent 30 April 1787. Shipped on the Prince of Wales.	Prince of Wales
James Freeman		Hertford		7		
Robert Freeman		London		7		
William Francis		London		7		
George Francisco		London	8 December 1784	7	Convicted at the Old Bailey for stealing three linen shirts (3s), one pair of stockings (6d), and four guineas (£4 4s). Claimed to have been formerly in a French prison for three years and that he had served in some naval capacity.	
George Fry				7		
Catherine Fryer					alias Prior	
William Fraser		Manchester		7	Arrested Manchester 1787 theft of wagon full of fustian and canvas. aka Frazer, possibly a Veteran of American War of Independence (British Army), First blacksmith. Married to Ellen Fraser (below) Died 13 Jun 1791	Charlotte.
Ellen Fraser (née REDCHESTER or REGISTER).		Manchester		7	Arrested Manchester 1787 theft of wagon full of fustian and canvas. First female landowner - 20 acres, CONCORD 1794 (adjacent to current Yaralla Estate), first female to vote in colony 1798. 1791-Wife of WILLIAM MORGAN, NSW Corps Second Fleet. Mother of second European child born in colony. First female to sue her spouse in court. New partner TOM HUMPHRIES 1806. Died 1840. Estimated 15,000 descendants as at 2025.	Charlotte.
John Fuller		Manchester		7		

== G ==
	Date of birth	Place of conviction	Date of conviction	Sentence	Other information	Transport ship
Francis Gardner		London		7		
Edward Garth		London		7		
Francis Garland		Exeter		7		Charlotte
Susannah Garth		London	10 September 1783	7	aka Grath. Convicted at the Old Bailey (with Elizabeth Dudgens) for stealing by pickpocketing nine guineas (£9 9s) and one half-guinea (10s 6d). On Friendship and from Rio on Charlotte.	Friendship and Charlotte
Mary Gabel		Southwark		7		Lady Penrhyn
Olive/Olivia Gascoygne		Worcester		7		Lady Penrhyn
Thomas Gearing		Oxford		Life		
George Gess		Gloucester		7		
Anne George		London		7		Lady Penrhyn
Thomas Glenton		Northallerton		7		
William Gloster		London		7		
Daniel Gordon		Winchester		7		
Edward Goodwin		London		7		
Andrew Goodwin		London	7 July 1784	7	Convicted at the Old Bailey (with William Butler) of stealing 200lbs of lead (20s).	
John Gould		Exeter		7		Charlotte
Charles Gray		Southwark		7		
Samuel Griffiths		Gloucester			alias Briscow	
Nicholas Greenwell		London		7		
John Green		Reading		7		
Thomas Griffiths		London		7		
Charles Granger		Plymouth		7		
James Grace						
Hannah Green					On Friendship then from Rio on board Charlotte	Friendship and Charlotte
Mary Groves	c. 1763	Lincoln	9 July 1785	7	Married William Douglas of the Alexander on 1 June 1788.	Prince of Wales
Mary Green		London		7		
Ann Green		London		7		
Mary Greenwood		London		7		
William Gunter		Bristol		7		

== H ==
Name	Date of birth	Place of conviction	Date of conviction	Sentence	Other information	Transport ship
John Hadon	c. 1756	Exeter		7	For more information see here	Charlotte
Richard Hagley	c. 1743	Winchester	2 March 1784	Death commuted to 7	For more information see here	Scarborough
Joseph Haines		Gloucester		7		
Elizabeth Hall		Newcastle		7		
John Hall		Exeter		7		Charlotte
Joseph Hall		Exeter		Life		Charlotte
Margaret Hall						
Samuel Hall		London		7		
Sarah Hall		London	17 January 1787	7	alias Hammond. Convicted at the Old Bailey of stealing two gowns (14s), a bed gown (6d) pence, a shirt (4d), a sheet (18d), two waistcoats (2s 6d), two aprons (5s), a cloak (6d), five handkerchiefs (18d), and three pair of stockings (18d).	Lady Penrhyn
Maria Hamilton		London	19 October 1785	7	Convicted at the Old Bailey of stealing one linen gown (21s), nine yards and a half of linen trimming (2ss 3d), one silk and cotton gown (6s), one black stuff flounced petticoat (6s), one apron (12d), one black silk bonnet (12d) and 9s 6d in money (Guilty of stealing 39s total).	
William Hamlin		Exeter		7	aka Hamlyn	Charlotte
John Handford		Winchester		7		
Dorothy Handland		London	22 February 1786	7	alias Gray. Convicted at the Old Bailey of perjury in her evidence given at the trial of William Till at the Old Bailey in December 1785.	
Cooper Handy						
Joseph Harbine		London		7		
Joshua Harper		London		7		
William Harris		Maidstone		7		
John Harris		London		Life		Scarborough
Joseph Harrison		London		7		
Mary Harrison		Lincoln		7		
Mary Harrison		London	19 October 1785	7	Convicted at the Old Bailey (with Charlotte Springmore) for willfully destroying and defacing one cloth cotton gown (10s) of Susannah Edhouse, and for "making an assault on her". Harrison was said to be a prostitute during the trial.	
Frances Hart						Friendship and Charlotte
John Hart		London	12 January 1785	7	For more information see here	
Catherine Hart		London	8 December 1784	7	Convicted of stealing three gowns (20s), a silk petticoat (3s), a dimity petticoat (3s), five shirts (20s), four shirts (8s) and 3 bonnets (3s). The total value was 49s. The court argued that if the items stolen were above 40s then the sentence would be death. The prosecutor claimed they were worth 30s in order to save the life of Hart.	
John Hart		Stafford		7		
John Hartley		Oxford		7		
Ester Harwood		London	30 October 1786	7	aka Howard. Convicted at the Old Bailey of stealing one silver watch (20s), two iron keys (1s), one half guinea and two shillings in money.	
John Hatch		Reading		7		
John Hatcher		Winchester		7		
William Hatfield		Maidstone		7		
Henry Hathaway		Gloucester		7		
Joseph Hatton		York	24 July 1784	7 years	Convicted at York Summer Assizes for Grand Larceny. Breaking and entering house on 9 April and then shop of Benjamin Clay on 13th, stealing material, ribbons and handkerchiefs.	Scarborough
Thomas Hawell		Stafford		7		
Dennis Hayes		London	8 December 1784	7	Convicted at the Old Bailey of highway robbery with a knife.	
John Hayes		Guildford		7		
John Haydon						Charlotte
William Ha?es						
William Haynes						
George Hayton		London		7	aka Clayton	
Elizabeth Hayward		London	10 January 1787	7	Convicted at the Old Bailey of stealing a linen gown (4s), a silk bonnet (2s) and a bath cloak (1s).	
Richard Head		Reading		7		
James Heading		Chelmsford		Life		
Thomas Headington		Abingdon		7		
Catherine Henry		London	10 January 1787	7	Convicted at the Old Bailey for stealing three muslin shawls (50s).	
Jane Herbert		London	30 August 1786	7	alias Rose, also known as Jenny Russell. Convicted at the Old Bailey of stealing one promisory note (£20).	Prince of Wales
John Herbert		London	21 April 1784	7	Convicted at the Old Bailey of stealing a silk handkerchief (1s).	Scarborough
John Herbert		Exeter		7		
Elizabeth Hervey						Friendship and Charlotte
John Hill		Maidstone		Life		
John Hill		London	26 May 1784	7	Convicted at the Old Bailey of stealing one linen handkerchief (6s).	
Mary Hill		London	25 October 1786	7	Convicted at the Old Bailey of stealing by highway robbery a gilt watch in an enamel case (£3), a blue watch ribbon (1d), a gold seal (20s) and a gold key (5s). Suggested to be a prostitute during her trial.	
Thomas Hill		London	7 July 1784	7	Convicted at the Old Bailey of stealing one pair of linen sheets (10s), one cotton gown (7s), one check linen apron (12d), one cloth cloak (6d).	
Thomas Hill				7		
William Hilt		Exeter		Life		
William Hindley		Ormskirk		7	alias Platt	
Ottiwell Hindle		Preston		7		
Elizabeth Hipsley		London		7		
William Hogg		London	21 April 1784	14	Convicted at the Old Bailey of Deception and Forgery by unlawfully stamping certain wares, with a certain mark and stamp in imitation of, and to resemble the said mark and stamp of the Lion and unlawfully, wilfully, and knowingly had, and were possessed of a certain mark and stamp, that was made to resemble the said mark and stamp (that of the Worshipful Company of Goldsmiths).	
William Holland		Exeter		7		
Job Hollister		Bristol		7		
Elizabeth Hollogin		London		7		
James Holloway		London	20 October 1784	7	Convicted of stealing at the Old Bailey a silk handkerchief (3s).	
Susannah Holmes					Accompanied by young son Henry.	Friendship and Charlotte
William Holmes		London	7 July 1784	7	Convicted of stealing at the Old Bailey one linen handkerchief (2s).	
James Hortopp		Exeter		7		Charlotte
John Howard		London		7		
Thomas Howard		London	12 January 1785	7	Convicted of stealing at the Old Bailey to the value of 39s.	
William Hubbard		Surrey	24 March 1784	7	Convicted of theft in the Kingston Assizes	Scarborough
John Hudson	1775	London	Dec 1783	7	Hudson was 8 yrs old when convicted in Dec 1783. He was 12 yrs old when he arrived in Jan 1788.	Friendship
Susannah Huffnell		Worcester		7	For more information see William Baker (colonist) (footnote a.)	
Frances Ann Hughes		Lancaster		7		
Hugh Hughes		Southwark		7		Alexander
John Hughes		Maidstone		7		
Thomas Hughes						
Edward Humphreys		London	8 December 1784	7	aka Humphries. Convicted at the Old Bailey for stealing one cloth great coat (30s) and one pair of leather boots (10s).	Scarborough
Henry Humphreys		Exeter		7		Charlotte
Mary Humphries		London				
Jeremiah Hurley		Exeter		7		
William Husband		London		7		
James Hussey						
Thomas Huxley		Warwick – Old Bailey London	25 June 1788	7	Alias Jones -	Salamander
Thomas Hylids		Guildford		7		

== I ==
Name	Date of birth	Place of conviction	Date of conviction	Sentence	Other information	Transport ship
Ann Inett	c. 1757	Worcester	11 March 1786	Death commuted to 7	For more information see here	Lady Penrhyn
Benjamin Ingram	c. 1768	London	8 December 1784	7	For more information see here	Scarborough
John Irvine	c. 1761	Lincoln	6 March 1784	7	For more information see here	Scarborough

== J ==
Name	Date of birth	Place of conviction	Date of conviction	Sentence	Other information	Transport ship
William Jackson		Durham		7		
David Jacobs		London	20 October 1784	7	Convicted at the Old Bailey for stealing two livery cloth great coats (40s).	
John Jacobs		London		7		
Hannah Jackson		Bristol		7		
Joseph Jaget		Exeter		7		
James Jameson						
Jane Jackson		London			alias Esther Robert	Lady Penrhyn
Mary Jackson		London	30 August 1786	7	Convicted at the Old Bailey for stealing a total of 6 shillings.	Lady Penrhyn
Robert Jeffries		Devizes		7		
John Jefferies		Maidstone		7		
Robert Jenkins		Maidstone		7	alias Brown	
John Jepp		London	23 February 1785	7	Conviction mentioned in the Old Bailey Punishment Summary.	
William Jenkins		Exeter		7		
Francis Jones		Winchester		7		
Charles Johnson		Manchester		7		Alexander
Edward Jones		London	15 September 1784	7	Convicted at the Old Bailey for stealing 6 watch movements (20s), 185 watch movements framed (£4), 1 brass watch cap (6d), 48 centre watch wheels and pin (12s), 76 watch barrels and harbours (15s), 66 great watch wheels and fuzees (24s), 21 cantright watch wheels (2s), 237 small watch pins (16s), 248 watch screw wheels (5s), 9 watch studs (6d), 17 watch vergers (2s), 30 watch balances (18d), 3 turnbenches (5s), a pair of men's shoes (6d), a pair of buckles (6d), a spectacle case mounted with steel (6d), and a linen sheet (3s).	
Thomas Josephs		London		7		
William Johnson		Kingston		7		
Stephen Johns		Launceston		7		
Margaret Jones		Launceston		14		
Edward Johnson		Dorcester		7		
John Jones		Exeter		14		
William Jones		Shrewsbury		7		
Richard Jones		Shrewsbury		7		
Thomas Jones		Bristol		14		
Catherine Johnson		London		7		
Mary Johnson		London		7		

== K ==
Name	Date of birth	Place of conviction	Date of conviction	Sentence	Other information	Transport ship
Henry Kable	c. 1767	Thetford	14 Mar 1783	Death commuted to 7	aka Cable	Friendship
John Kellan	c. 1765	London	10 Sep 1783	Death commuted to Life	aka John Herbert Keeling. Convicted of stealing one steel hilted sword (10s) on 30 April 1783 and sentenced to 7 years transportation in America. Returned from transportation with 24 other convicts after taking control of the Swift in which he was to be transported. He was apprehended peacefully in August 1783 in Sandhurst, Kent. He was convicted for returning from transportation and sentenced to death, later commuted to transportation for life. His occupation was listed as a seaman. He was considered a man of education and ability Major Robert Ross. Night watch member in Sydney in 1789. On Norfolk Island on 31 July 1791 given 50 lashes for contempt of Ross's orders. Keeling left Norfolk Island on the Kitty for Port Jackson in March 1793 and received a conditional pardon in 1800. In January 1803 he was charged with assault and battery. In April 1806 he was charged with forging two £2 promissory notes. He conducted his own defence but the evidence was overwhelming and he was sentenced to death. He was hanged on 28 April 1806.	Scarborough
Thomas Kelly	c. 1764	Pontefract	13 Jan 1785	7		Alexander
Martha Kennedy	c. 1756	Kingston	9 Apr 1787	7		Prince of Wales
Thomas Kidney	c. 1764	Bristol	30 Oct 1782	7	aka Kidner	Alexander
William Kilby	c. 1737	Reading	16 Jan 1784	Death commuted to Life		Alexander
John King	c. 1754	London	21 Apr 1784	7	Convicted for stealing one man's box great coat (18s) and one linen towel (6d).	Scarborough
David Kilpack	c. 1760	London	10 Sep 1783	Death commuted to Life	aka Killpack. Originally sentenced to 7 years transportation to America for theft of one live turkey cock (1s 6d), one live cock (1s), two live hens (1s), and two live ducks (1s) on 26 February 1783. He was part of a group of 24 convicts led principally by John Kellan which overthrew their transportation vessel bound for America and returned to Britain. He was tried for returning from transportation and sentenced to death, but the sentence was commuted to transportation for life.	Scarborough
Edward Kimberly	c. 1765	Coventry	20 Mar 1783	7	For more information see here	Scarborough
John Knowler	c. 1762	Maidstone	16 Mar 1785	7	aka Nowland. Knowler, a labourer, was convicted of robbery of a coat, gloves and shoes (9s). He died in 1822 in Van Diemans Land.	Alexander
Andrew Knowland	c. 1755	London	10 Sep 1783	Death commuted to 7	a.k.a. Roman, Ronan, Rowland. Convicted at the Old Bailey for fraud of a shipmate on board HMS Nemesis. Originally sentenced to death, it was commuted to transportation at a later date. Knowland was involved in the mutiny aboard the convict ship the Swift which set sail for the Americas in 1784. He was captured and sent to Australia. During his incarceration awaiting transportation, Andrew was referred to as "troublesome" by his jailers aboard the Dunkirk prison hulk.	Friendship

== L ==
Name	Date of birth	Place of conviction	Date of conviction	Sentence	Other information	Transport ship
David Lankey	c. 1760	London 1234	26 May 1784	7	For more information see here	Scarborough
Richard Lane		Winchester	2 Mar 1784	7	For more information see here	Scarborough
John Lawrell		Bodmin	18 Aug 1783	7	For more information see here	Scarborough
William Lane	c. 1756	Chelmsford	28 Jul 1784	7	For more information see here	Scarborough
James Larne		Exeter	12 Jul 1785	7	For more information see here	Charlotte
John Lambeth	c. April 1763	Bristol	29 Mar 1785	Death commuted to 7	Lambeth, a blacksmith from Fillongly, Warwickshire, was sentenced to death for stealing a promissory note and money (172s). Lambeth was referred to as "tolerably decent and orderly" by his jailers aboard the Dunkirk Prison Hulk. He died on 2 July 1788.	Friendship
Henry Lavell	Henry	London	11 Sep 1782	Death commuted to Life	For more information see here	Friendship
Flora Lara	Flora	London	21 Jan 1787	7	For more information see here	Prince of Wales
Caroline Laycock		London	30 Mar 1785	7	For more information see here	Prince of Wales
Jane Langley	16 Sep 1761	London	29 Jul 1785	7	For more information see here	Lady Penrhyn
Mary Lawrence	c. 1754	London	26 May 1784	7	For more information see here	Lady Penrhyn
Isaac Lemon	Isaac	Chelmsford	7 Mar 1785	7	Lemon, a labourer, was convicted for stealing a bay gelding horse (200s). Originally sentenced to death, Lemon's sentence was commuted to 7 years transportation. He died during the voyage on board the Alexander on 11 March 1787.	Alexander
Joseph Levy		London	26 May 1784	7	For more information see here	Scarborough
John Leary		Winchester	3 Mar 1783	Death commuted to 7	For more information see here	Scarborough
George Legg		Dorchester	16 Mar 1786	7	For more information see here	Charlotte
Jeremiah Leary		Bristol	30 Mar 1784	Death commuted to 14	For more information see here	Friendship
Stephen Legrove		London	14 Jan 1784	7	For more information see here	Friendship
Elizabeth Lee		London	23 Feb 1785	7	For more information see here	Lady Penrhyn
Sophia Lewis		London	25 Oct 1786	Death commuted to 7	For more information see here	Lady Penrhyn
Elizabeth Leonard	c. 1760	London	20 Oct 1784	7	For more information see here	Lady Penrhyn
Amelia Levy		Southwark	9 Jan 1787	7	For more information see here	Lady Penrhyn
George List	c. 1759	London	10 Sep 1783	Life	For more information see here	Scarborough
John Limeburner	c. 1743	New Sarum	9 Jul 1785	7	For more information see here	Charlotte
Thomas Limpus	23 Jul 1760	London	10 Sep 1783	Life	For more information see here	
Samuel Lightfoot	c. 1753	Exeter	14 Mar 1785	Death commuted to 7	For more information see here	Charlotte
Joseph Longstreet		Marlborough	5 Oct 1784	7	Longstreet was convicted at Marlborough for stealing dyed Spanish wool. He died at sea on 19 July 1787.	Alexander
Joseph Long		Gloucester	23 Mar 1785	Death commuted to 14	For more information see here	Alexander
John Lockley		London	22 Feb 1786	Death commuted to 7	For more information see here	Alexander
Mary Love	c. 1725	Maidstone	15 Mar 1785	14	For more information see here	Lady Penrhyn
Elizabeth Lock		Gloucester	26 Mar 1783	7	For more information see here	Lady Penrhyn
Nathaniel Lucas	1764	London	7 Jul 1784	7		Scarborough
Humphrey Lynch		New Sarum	5 Mar 1785	7	For more information see here	Alexander
Ann Lynch	1746	Bristol	30 Mar 1786	14	For more information see here	Charlotte
John Lloyd		London	25 Feb 1784	7	Aka Loyd, Lyde. Lloyd was convicted for stealing on 21 February 1784 one wooden till (6d), one half-guinea (10s 6d), two half-crowns (5s), and 20s in money. Lloyd was sentenced to 7 years transportation and placed aboard the Mercury bound for Nova Scotia and was involved in the Mercury Mutiny, in April 1784 and returned to England, landing in Torbay, where Lloyd was captured. He was later sent to New South Wales. A report from the Dunkirk Hulk describes John as "in general tolerably well behaved but troublesome at times." Lloyd died on 27 September 1811 in Sydney.	Friendship

== M ==
Name	Date of birth	Place of conviction	Date of conviction	Sentence	Other information	Transport ship
James M'Donnaugh	1752	Maidstone	11 Jul 1785	7	For more information see here	Alexander
Charles M'Laughlin	c. 1770	Durham	21 Jul 1785	7	For more information see here	Alexander
Edward M'Lean	c. 1731	Maidstone	15 Mar 1784	7	aka MacLean, MacClean. M'Lean, a labourer, was convicted at Maidstone for stealing many items of clothing (159s). Originally sentenced to death, this was commuted to seven years transportation.	Scarborough
Francis M'Lean	24 March 1784	Guildford		7	For more information see here	Alexander
Thomas M'Lean		Guildford		7	For more information see here	Alexander
John MacIntire		Durham		7		
John Mansfield		Chelmsford		7 Years Transportation	Stole 8 pigs	Alexander
Betty Mason		Gloucester		14		
Sarah McCormick		Manchester		7		
Mary McCormack		Liverpool		7	Married William Parr soon after arrival.	Friendship
Richard McDeed						
Redman McGrah	Redman					
James Medlycott	James					
William Mariner		Oxford		7		
William Marney		London		7		
Jane Marriott		London		7		
John Marrott		Gloucester		7		
Mary Marshall		London		Life		
Joseph Marshall		London		14		
Mary Marshall		London		7		
Ann Martin		Southwark				Lady Penrhyn
Abraham Martin		New Sarum		7		
John Martin		London		7		
Stephen Martin		Bristol		7		
Thomas Martin		Exeter		7		
James Martyn		Exeter		7		
Susannah Mason		London			alias Gibbs	
Ann Mather		London		7		
Mather MATHER		London		7		
Thomas Matson		Maidstone		7		
Richard May		New Sarun		7		
Eleanor McCabe		London		7	alias Magee	
William McNamar	William					
John Meynell		Nottingham			alias William Radford	
Jacob Messiah						
Jane Meech		Exeter		7	Mrs. William Meech	
Samuel Midgley		Lancaster		7		
Richard Middleton		London		7		
Edward Miles				7		
Matthew Mills						
Charles Milton		Maidstone		7		
Mary Mitchcraft		Kingston		7		
Mary Mitchell		Kingston		7		
Nathaniel Mitchell		Dorchester		7		
John Mollands		Launceston		7		
Samuel Mobbs		London		7		
Charles Mood				7		
John Moorin		London		7		
William Moore	William	London		7		
John Morley		London		7		
Richard Morgan		Gloucester		7		
Robert Morgan	Robert	London		7		
William Morgan		London		7		
Joseph Morley	Marlow aka Mawley	Winchester, Hants	3 March 1783	Life, reduced to 7 years of transportation	Morley with Henry Roach, Francis Garland and two others were sentenced to death at Winchester, Hants on 3 March 1783 for highway assault and theft. On 21 April he was reprieved to seven years of transportation. Transported to the Mercury, 26 March 1784. He, among others, escaped in a mutiny at Torbay. Recaptured and sent to Dunkirk hulk. On 11 March 1878 was discharged to the Friendship. Morley (as Mawley) landed at Port Jackson in 1788. Two marriage certificates to Mary Gosling 19 December 1790, at St John's Church Parramatta. One under Morley and another under Marlow. He settled at Prospect, given while still under sentencing in the first round of land grants, 18 July 1791. Watkins Tench, visiting the area in December recorded him as Marlow. Morely was among those who signed the petition on 30 November 1792 asking the Governor to arrange for a Catholic Priest to be sent to the colony. He became the district constable at prospect until his dismissal in 1820. He died in 1822. His nephew Joseph Morley (Jnr) came on the second fleet (;). The farm was sold to Joseph Morley Jnr. Joseph Morley (Jnr) purchased a property in Newcastle. Morley's relationship with natives. There is evidence that Morley (Snr) was the adoptive or father of Joe Marlow, and Edward two Aboriginal boys taken to the native children's Institution in Parramatta, 1 January 1818 & 17 January 1818 respectively. Another child from Prospect who entered the institution was Kitty, 28 December 1814	Friendship
Peter Morris		Bristol		7		
James Morrisby		London		7	For more information see here	
John Mortimore		Exeter		7		
Mary Morton		London	23 February 1785	7	Tried for stealing three pieces containing seventeen handkerchiefs (18s).	
John Mowbray		Lincoln		7		
William	William	Guildford		7		
Edward Moyle		Launceston		7		
Hannah Mullens		London	10 January 1787	Life	There is no transcription of Mullens' trial. However, she is mentioned in the Old Bailey Punishment Summary as having received His Majesty's pardon after being capitally convicted at former sessions on the condition of being transported for the following terms, to the Eastern coast of New South Wales, or some one or other of the islands adjacent. She became wife of Charles Peat.	Lady Penrhyn
Stephen Mullis		Exeter		7		
Jesse Mullock		New Sarum		7		
Lydia Munro		Kingston		14		Prince of Wales
John Munroe	c. 1770	London	21 April 1784	7	alias Nurse. Tried at the Old Bailey, with George Robinson and George Bannister, for stealing one marcella petticoat (8s), one child's dimity cloak (3s), one linen gown (1s 6d) and one pair of cotton stockings (6d).	
James Murphy				7		
William Murphy		Liverpool		7		

== N ==
Name	Date of birth	Place of conviction	Date of conviction	Sentence	Other information	Transport ship
John Newland		London		7		Scarborough
Robert Nettleton		Kingston upon		7		Alexander
John Neal		London		7		Scarborough
James Neal		Bristol		7		Friendship
Elizabeth Needham		London		7		Lady Penrhyn
John Nicholls		London		7		Scarborough
Phebe Norton	1761	London	25 Oct 1786	7	Alias Jones, Knight. Norton, a servant and housekeeper to James Milne, stole on 20 August 1786, a tablespoon, 3 teaspoons, a counterpane, 3 sheets, a coat, a satin waistcoat, a table cloth, 2 check curtains and a pair of leather gloves (34.5s) from Milne. As reported by Arthur Bowes Smyth, "Phebe Norton, A convict on board us fell from the head (the toilet seat at the bow of the ship), into the Sea, it was a remarkable calm day, therefore before she had time to go down, two men jump’d overboard & saved her by hauling her into the pinnace which was fasten’d at the stern."	Lady Penrhyn
Robert Nunn		London		7		Scarborough

== O ==
Name	Date of birth	Place of conviction	Date of conviction	Sentence	Other information	Transport ship
John O'Craft	c. 1750	Exeter	24 May 1784	Death commuted to 7	For more information see here	Charlotte
James Ogden	c. Feb 1769	Manchester	20 Jan 1785	7 years	Ogden, a labourer born in Ashton-under-Lyne, was convicted of stealing a purse and six pieces of gold of unknown value. Ogden married Elizabeth Kelsell in January 1800 at Parramatta and by 1806 he was a landholder at The Ponds with 50 acres. Ogden died on 19 September 1820 at St John's, Parramatta.	Alexander
William Okey	c. 1768	Gloucester	24 Mar 1784	Death commuted to 7	Okey, a labourer, was convicted for stealing six chines of bacon, four loaves of bread and other goods (61s). Originally sentenced to death, his sentence was commuted to seven years transportation. Okey was killed by Aborigines on 30 May 1788.	Alexander
Isabella Oldfield	c. Sep 1764	Manchester	20 Jul 1786	7 years	Oldfield, from Skipton, Yorkshire, was convicted (with her brother Thomas Oldfield) of stealing three pieces of cloth (1s) In October 1787 she transferred to the Prince of Wales while anchored at the Cape of Good Hope. She died on 17 March 1789 at Sydney Cove.	Friendship and Prince of Wales
Thomas Oldfield	c. May 1763	Manchester	20 Jul 1786	7 years	For more information see here	Friendship
Peter Opley		Maidstone	14 Mar 1786	7 years	For more information see here	Alexander
Thomas Orford		London	7 Jul 1784	7 years	For more information see here	
Thomas Osborne		London		7 years		Alexander
Elizabeth Osborne		London		7 years	alias Jones	Lady Penrhyn
John Owles		Croydon		7 years		Alexander
John Owen	16 Jan 1769	London	10 Sep 1783	7 years	John Owen, at the age of fourteen, and with another boy, was chased across a field when a box of 18 table knives went missing from the sideboard in a house. He said in court "I was taking a walk round, and some boys came up to me, and said there was a mad bull, and presently a gentleman pursued us and took us back." He was sentenced to transportation for seven years at the Old Bailey on 10 September 1783, and was received on the Censor hulk on 4 October where he remained for over 3 years. On 24 February 1787 he was taken by wagon to Portsmouth and embarked on the "Scarborough", part of the First Fleet to Australia, 3 days later.	Scarborough
Joseph Owen		Shrewsbury		14 years		Friendship

== P ==
Name	Date of birth	Place of conviction	Date of conviction	Sentence	Other information	Transport ship
Paul Paige		Lincoln		7		
William Pane		Nottingham		7		
Edward Parry		Stafford		7		
William Parr		Liverpool		7	For more information see here	Alexander
John Henry Palmer		London		7		
John Parker		London		7		
William Parish	1751	London	20 Oct 1784	7	William Parish, alias Potter may have been an unemployed seaman, but on 27 September 1784 he became a highwayman. Parish was tried before Mr Recorder. Parish was indicted for feloniously assaulting William Stent with a pistol on the King's highway on 27 September 1784, with intent to steal money from Stent.	
Richard Partridge		London		Death commuted to Life	Originally sentenced to 7 years transportation to America at the Old Bailey for stealing one linen shift (3s), one linen apron (3s), one pair of cotton stockings (6d) pence, and one pair of linen cover sluts (6d) on 30 April 1783. He was part of a group of 24 convicts led principally by John Kellan who overthrew their transportation vessel bound for America, the Swift and returned to Britain. He was tried at the Old Bailey for returning from transportation and sentenced to death. The sentence was commuted to transportation for life on 10 September 1783.	
Peter Parris		Exeter		7		
Jane Parkinson		Manchester			aka Partington	
Elizabeth Parker		Gloucester		7	Accompanied by her daughter Ann	Friendship then from Cape Charlotte
Ann Parsely		London	1787	7	For more information see here	Prince of Wales
Mary Parker		London		7		Lady Penrhyn
Sarah Partridge		London		7	alias Roberts	
Sarah Parry		London		Life		
Edward Bearcro Perrot		Bristol		7		
John Petrie		London		7		
Samuel Peyton		London		7		
Richard Percival		London	7 Jul 1784	7	Convicted of stealing one silver watch (30s), one silver milk pot (10s), one silver spoon (5s), one pair of steel scissors with silver bows (2s), one pair of leather shoes (5s), a quantity of sugar (1s), half 2 pound of tobacco (2s), one linen towel (6d) and 480 copper halfpence (20s). On 23 February 1785, his sentence of seven years transportation was transferred from transportation to America to transportation to Africa.	
John Pettitt		London	21 Apr 1784	7	Convicted of stealing one flute, called an English flute (4s), and two fifes (1s).	
James Peaulet		London		7		
Charles Peat		London	23 Feb 1785	Life	Originally convicted on 5 December 1781 and sentenced to death for stealing by highway robbery a silk purse (3d), and money (23s) on Finchley Common. The sentence of death was later overturned and Peat was sentenced to transportation for life in Nova Scotia. He was involved in the Mercury Mutiny and was found "at large" in England, his return from transportation is recorded in the Old Bailey Punishment Summaries of 10 September 1783. Peat was sentenced to transportation for life in 1785. He became the husband of Hannah Mullens.	Scarborough
Joshua Peck		Exeter		7		
Edward Perkins		Plymouth		7		
John Petherick		Plymouth		7		
John Penny				7		
William Phillimore		London	10 Dec 1783	7	Convicted at the Old Bailey. Unusually, details of Phillimore's trial is not transcribed.	
Richard Phillips		London	10 Dec 1783	7	Convicted of stealing 16lbs of lead (4s).	
Mary Phillips		Taunton		7	For more information see here	
Roger Phyfield		Shrewsbury			aka Twyfield	Friendship
Mary Phyn		London		7		
Samuel Pigott		Exeter		7		
Mary Pinder		Lincoln		7		
Elizabeth Pipkin		London		7		
Mary Piles		London	6 Apr 1785	7	aka Pile. Originally convicted on 15 January 1783 to be fined 1s and to serve twelve months in a House of Correction for stealing one linen apron (5s), five caps (40s), one muslin handkerchief (3s), one metal watch (£3), one steel chain (1d) and money (16s). Piles was convicted once again for stealing money (29s 6d). During the trial she was referred to as "the female highwayman."	
David Pope		Southwark		7		
John Power		London	14 Dec 1785	7	Power was convicted with Charles Young of stealing 2092lb of wood, called Red Sanders wood (£20) the property of the East India. The trial in question results in a verdict of not guilty. However, both Young and Power are listed in the Old Bailey Punishment Summaries as sentenced to 7 years transportation. Both defended by William Garrow who said in his defence that "There is no evidence at all against Power" when cross-examining the witness Judah Bottlebold and that "what Bottlebold says against Power alone, is not evidence."	
John Pontie		London	7 Jul 1784	Death commuted to Life	Convicted at the Old Bailey (with John Matthew Cox a.k.a. Banbury Jack) of stealing thirteen yards of lace (£5). Originally sentenced to death, overturned to transportation for life on 23 February 1785.	
Jane Poole		Wells		7		Charlotte
William Poore		Dorchester		7	Aka Power, Poor	Charlotte
Elizabeth Powley	1762	Thetford, Norfolk, England	14 March 1783	Death – commuted to 7 years transportation	AKA – Elizabeth Pulley	Friendship/ Prince of Wales
Ann Powell		London	13 Dec 1786	7	Convicted of stealing one pair of stays (10s), one gown (10s), one apron (2s), and one black silk cloak (10s).	
James Price		Gloucester		7		
John Price		Southwark		7		
Catherine Prior					Prior's son John Matthew was born at sea on 14 Nov 1787.	
Thomas Prior		Reading		7		
Thomas Pritchard						
Edward Pugh		Gloucester		7		
Elizabeth Pulley	1762	Thetford, Norfolk, England	14 March 1783	Death – commuted to 7 years transportation	AKA – Elizabeth Powley	Friendship/ Prince of Wales

== R ==
Name	Date of birth	Place of conviction	Date of conviction	Sentence	Other information	Transport ship
John Randall	c. 1764	Manchester	1785	7	Aka Randel and Raynolds. Tried at Manchester 1785 for stealing a silver watch chain, was then sent to the Ceres hulk, then 1786 delivered to the ship Alexander for transportation for 7 years. He stated his birthplace to be New Haven Connecticut, Nth America. He was an African American and, considering the area he was from and the time, was most probably a slave before making his way to England. It is not known how he made his way to England.	Alexander
George Reymond		London		7		
John Ramfey		Kinston		7		
Charles Repeat		Warwick		7		
William Read		Croydon		7		
Bartholomew Reardon		Winchester		7		
Ann Read		London		Life		Lady Penrhyn
Thomas Risdale		Bristol		Life	alias Crowder	
James Richard		East Grinstead		7		
James Richardson		Maidstone		7		
Edward Risby	21 February 1755	Gloucester	24 March 1784	7	Edward was imprisoned for stealing and sentenced for three years in the Thames hulks. Upon release he was caught again for stealing a bolt of cloth soon after. Edward was tried at the Gloucestershire Assizes on 24 March 1784. In October 1784 Edward was sentenced to three years on the Thames hulk Censor and then deportation to complete a seven-year sentence.	Alexander
William Richardson	c. Feb 1761	London	10 Dec 1783	Death commuted to 7	Convicted for assault and highway robbery (27s). Married Isabella Rosson in September 1789 and had at least 2 children. Described as having a thin face, fair complexion, dark brown hair, grey eyes, and 5' 5" tall.	Alexander
Hardwicke Richardson		London	25 Oct 1786	7	Convicted for stealing clothing (60s).	Alexander
John Richardson	c. 1760	London	7 Jul 1784	7	Aka Mann. Convicted for stealing household goods (77s). Fathered two children with Mary Finn	Scarborough
David Richard		London		7		
Samuel Richardson	c. 1766	London	15 Sep 1784	7	Convicted for stealing silk (40s).	Scarborough
William Rickson		Chelmsford		7		
John Richards		Winchester		7	alias Williams	
James Richard		Launceston		7		
John Rice		Exeter		7		Charlotte
Anthony Rope	1755	Chelmsford, Essex, England	7 March 1785	7 years	Married fellow First Fleeter – Elizabeth Pulley/Powley	Alexander
Daniel Rogers		Croydon		7		
George Robinson		Lincoln		7		
Isaac Rogers		Gloucester		14		
Thomas Robinson		Kingston upon		7		
John Roberts		Liverpool		7		
George Robinson	c. 1770	London	21 April 1784	7	Tried (with George Bannister and John Monroe alias Nurse) for stealing one marcella petticoat (8s), one child's dimity cloak (3s), one linen gown (1s 6d) and one pair of cotton stockings (6d)	
John Romain		London	11 May 1784	7	There is no transcription of Romain's trial at the Old Bailey. However, he is mentioned in the Old Bailey Punishment Summary as having his transportation location changed from America to Africa.	
John Rowe		Launceston		7		
William Rowe		Launceston		7		
William Roberts	c. 1755	Bodmin	17 August 1786	7	Convicted for the theft of five pound and half weight of yarn (9s), property of William Moffat of Launceston	Scarborough
William Robinson		Exeter		7		
Henry Roach		Exeter		7		
John Robins		Exeter		7	alias Major	
Walton Rous					alias Batley	
Mary Rolt		London				
Isabella Rosson		London	10 Jan 1787	7	Tried for stealing one tambour muslin (2s).	
John Russel		London		7		
John Ruglass		London	23 Feb 1785	Life	There is no transcription of Ruglass's trial. However, he is mentioned in the Old Bailey Punishment Summaries as being sentenced to be transported for life.	
John Russler		London		Life		
James Ruse		Bodmin		7	aka Ruce	
Robert Ruth		Exeter		7		
John Ryan						

== S ==
Name	Date of birth	Place of conviction	Date of conviction	Sentence	Other information	Transport ship
William Saltmarsh	c. 1770	Kingston	29 Mar 1785	7		Alexander
Thomas Sanderson		Lincoln		7		
William Sands		Lincoln		7		Alexander
Peter Sampson		London		7	Convicted (with Charles Allen) of burglarious breaking and entering a dwelling and stealing one linen sheet (10s), eight damask table cloths (40s), one sheet (10s), eight shirts (3s 1d) and one counterpane (10s).	Scarborough
Ann Sandlin		London		7	alias Lynes	Lady Penrhyn
Robert Scattergood		Stafford		7		Alexander
Elizabeth Scott		London		7	Convicted (with Sarah Ault) for stealing four bridles (11s), one bradoon (2s), two strap irons (1s), and two leather straps (1s).	Prince of Wales
Samuel Selshire		London		7		Scarborough
John Seymour		Sherborne		7		Scarborough
William Shearman		Reading		7		Alexander
Joseph Shaw		Stafford		7		Alexander
Robert Shepherd		Durham		7		Alexander
George Sharp		Durham		7		Alexander
William Shore		Lancaster		7		Alexander
James Shiers		London		Life		Scarborough
John Silverthorn		New Sarum		7		Alexander
Robert Sidaway		London		Life	aka Sideway, Sideaway	Friendship
Sarah Slater		London		7		Lady Penrhyn
John Small		Exeter		7		Charlotte
Richard Smart		Gloucester		7		Alexander
Daniel Smart		Gloucester		7		Alexander
Thomas Smith		Lancaster		7		Alexander
William Smith		Liverpool		7		Alexander
Edward Smith		London		7		Scarborough
William Smith		London		7		Scarborough
Thomas Smith		London		7	alias Haynes	Scarborough
James Smith		London		7		Scarborough
John Smith		Guildford		7		Scarborough
William Smith		Bodmin		1		Scarborough
Ann Smith		Winchester		7	Mrs John Smith was accompanied by her young daughter Ann.	Charlotte
Hannah Smith		Winchester		7		Lady Penrhyn
William Smith		Dorchester		7		Charlotte
Edward Smith		Exeter		7		Charlotte
John Smith		Exeter		7		Charlotte
Ann Smith		London		7		Lady Penrhyn
Catherine Smith		London		7		Prince of Wales
Catherine Smith		London		7		Lady Penrhyn
Mary Smith		London		7		Lady Penrhyn
William Snaleham		London		7		Scarborough
Henry Sparks						
Daniel Spencer		Dorchester		14		Charlotte
John Spencer					alias Pearce	
Mary Spence		Wigan		5		Prince of Wales
Charlotte Springmore		London	19 Oct 1785	7	Convicted (with Mary Harrison) of an assault upon Susannah Edhouse, with willfully destroying her cloth cotton gown (10s). She was said to be a prostitute during her trial.	
Mary Springham	29 Feb 1768	London	25 Oct 1786	7	For more information see here	Lady Penrhyn
James Squire		Kingston		7	aka Squires	Charlotte (originally on Friendship)
William Stanley		New Sarum		7		Alexander
Thomas Stanton	c. 1760	Launceston	19 Mar 1785	7	alias Abdin, Ebden, Eldon, Ibden. Stealing a horse – geldings (400s).	Scarborough
John Morris Stephens		Dorchester		7		Charlotte
Margaret Stewart		Exeter		7		Charlotte
John Stogdell		London		14		Alexander
John Stokee		Durham		7		
Charles Stone		London		7		Alexander
Henry Stone		London		7		
Martin Stone		Warwick		7		Alexander
James Stow		Lincoln		7		Alexander
Thomas Strech		Shrewsbury		7	aka Stretch	Friendship
James Strong		Dorchester		7		Alexander
James Stuart		London		7		Scarborough
John Summers		Gloucester	13 Jul 1784	7	Convicted for stealing a knapsack.	Alexander

== T ==
Name	Date of birth	Place of conviction	Date of conviction	Sentence	Other information	Transport ship
Joshua Taylor	c. 1768	Manchester	14 Oct 1784	7	Theft of handkerchief (1s)	Alexander
Henry Taylor	c. 1754	London	14 Jan 1784	7	Convicted for stealing iron bars and railing (15s). Involved in the Mercury Mutiny.	Friendship
Sarah Taylor	c. 1755	Kingston	9 Apr 1787	7	Convicted (with Mary Mitchcraft and Martha Kennedy) for assault and robbery (12s). She married William French Brown in 1788.	Prince of Wales
Thomas Hilton Tenant		Chelmsford			alias Phillip Devine	
Cornelius Teague		Bodmin		7		
James Tenchall					aka Tenninghill	
Elizabeth Thackery	c. 1767	Manchester	4 May 1786	7	The last survivor of the First Fleet.	Friendship then from Cape Charlotte
William Thompson		Durham		7		
James Thomas		London		7		
James Thompson		London		7		
James Thomas		London		7		
John Thomas		London		7		
William Thompson		London		7		
James Thoudy						
Elizabeth Thomas		Wigan		7		
Ann Thornton		London		7		
Thomas Tunmins		Warwick		7		
Thomas Tilley		Stafford		7		
Thomas Till		London		7		
Nicholas Todd		London		7		
Joseph Trotter		Maidstone		7		Alexander
John Trace		Exeter		7		
Susannah Trippett		London		7		
Ralph Turner	c. 1749	Manchester	14 Apr 1785	7		Alexander
Joseph Tuso		London		Life		
John Turner	c. 1740	Maidstone	16 Apr 1783	7	Convicted for stealing a cask of beer (18s). Involved in the Mercury Mutiny.	Friendship
Moses Tucker		Plymouth		7		
Thomas Turner	c. 1740	Oxford	6 Mar 1782	Death to 7	Convicted for assault and highway robbery (52s). Involved in the Mercury Mutiny.	Friendship
John Turner	c. 1759	York	24 Jul 1784	Death to 7	Convicted for stealing a horse – a gelding (140s).	Scarborough
Mary Turner	c. 1766	Worcester	5 Mar 1785	7	Aka Wilkes. Convicted for stealing clothing (42s).	Lady Penrhyn
William Twyneham		Reading		7		
Ann Twyfield		Shrewsbury		7jioupi		
William Tyrrell		Winchester		7		

== U ==
Name	Date of birth	Place of conviction	Date of conviction	Sentence	Other information	Transport ship
James Underwood	c. 1743	New Sarum	11 Mar 1786	Death commuted to 14	For more information see here	Charlotte
John Usher	c. 1769	Maidstone	17 Mar 1785	7	For more information see here	Alexander

== V ==
Name	Date of birth	Place of conviction	Date of conviction	Sentence	Other information	Transport ship
William Vickery	c. 1762	Exeter	20 Mar 1786	7	For more information see here	Charlotte
Henry Vincent	c. 1760	London	21 April 1784	7	Vincent was convicted with two other men of stealing on 31 March 1784 200 lb of currants (£4), and one wooden cask (1s). Vincent died on 7 March 1788 at Port Jackson, approximately two months after the arrival of the First Fleet in New South Wales.	Scarborough

== W ==
Name	Date of birth	Place of conviction	Date of conviction	Sentence	Other information	Transport ship
Benjamin Wager		London		7		
Ellen Wainwright		Preston		7	alias Esther Eccles	
Mary Wade		London		14	alias Cacklane	
James Walbourne		London		7		
Richard Waddicomb		Exeter		7		
John Walker		London		7		
William Wall		Oxford		7		
William Walsh		London		7		
Ann Ward		London		7		
John Ward		Lowth		7		
Charlotte Ware						Charlotte
William Waterhouse		Kingston		7		
Mary Watkins						Friendship then from Rio Charlotte
John Watsan		Maidstone		7		
Thomas Watson		Exeter		7		
James Welch		Maidstone		7		
John Welch		Durham		7		
John Welch		London		Death commuted to Life	Originally sentenced to 7 years transportation to America at the Old Bailey for stealing one large copper (10s), one copper saucepan (3s), and one brass boiling pot (3s) on 11 September 1782. He was part of a group of 24 convicts lead principally by John Kellan which overthrew their transportation vessel bound for America, the Swift and returned to Britain. He was tried at the Old Bailey for returning from transportation and sentenced to death by hanging. His sentence was commuted to transportation for life on 10 September 1783.	
John Welsh		London		7		
Benjamin West		London		7		
John Westwood		London		7		
Edward Westlake		Exeter		7		
Samuel Wheeler		Croydon		7		
George Whitaker		Maidstone		7		
James White		Maidstone		7		
William Whiting		Gloucester		7		
Edward Whitton		Maidstone		Death commuted to Life	Labourer convicted of assault and highway robbery, sentenced to be hanged. Reprieved on condition of serving life at James Fort, Gambia. held within a hulk for two and a half years due to complications with the establishment of a Gambian penal colony. After the colony was abandoned Edward was eventually ordered to join the Scarborough aged 30.	Scarborough
Samuel Wilcocks		Dorcester		7		
William Wilton	William	Bristol		7		
Charles Wilson		London		Death commuted to Life	Originally sentenced to transportation to America, he was part of a group of 24 convicts lead principally by John Kellan which overthrew their transportation vessel bound for America, the Swift and returned to Britain. He was tried for returning from transportation and sentenced to death by hanging. His sentence was commuted to transportation for life on 10 September 1783.	
Peter Wilson		Manchester		7		
Charles Williams		London	w2	7	For more information see here	
Daniel Williams		Preston		7		
Frances Williams		Mold		7		
James Williams		London		7		
John Williams		Bodmin		7	alias Floyd	
John Williams		Maidstone		7	alias Black Jack	
John Williams		Exeter		7		
Mary Williams		London		7		
Peter Williams		Exeter		7	alias Flaggett	
Robert Williams		Launceston		7		
Richard Wilcocks	Richard	Exeter		7		
Mary Wickham		New Sarum		14		
John Wilding		Bury		7	alias Warren. Died during passage.	Scarborough
John Wisehammer		Bristol		7		
George Wood		London		7		
Mark Wood						
Francis Woodcock		Shrewsbury		7		
Peter Woodcock		London		7		
Samuel Woodham		London		Life		
Jack Wolff		London		7		Scarborough
John Woolcot		Exeter		Life		
Samuel Woolley		London		15	Husband of Sarah Woolley. They were sentenced together.	Charlotte
Sarah Woolley		London		14	Wife of Samuel Woolley. They were sentenced together.	Charlotte
William Worsdell		Launceston		7		
Ann Wright	Ann	London		7		
Benjamin Wright		London		7		
James Wright	c. 1757	Maidstone		7	Originally sentenced to death for highway robbery, his sentence was commuted to 7 years transportation to Africa, which was later changed to New South Wales. Served as Colonial Baker under Governor Phillip from 1788 to c.1792 and then as Government Baker at Parramatta c.1792 to c.1810. James married Third Fleet convict Letitia Holland on 10 April 1810. They had four children. James died on 15 March 1825 and is buried in St.John's Cemetery, Parramatta.	Scarborough
Joseph Wright		London		7		Scarborough
Thomas Wright		Reading		7		
William Wright		London		7		

== Y ==
Name	Date of birth	Place of conviction	Date of conviction	Sentence	Other information	Transport ship
Thomas Yardsley	c. 1759	Shrewsbury	4 Aug 1784	7	aka Yasley	Scarborough
Nancy Yates	c. 1768	York	9 Jul 1785	Death to 7	aka Yeats	Lady Penrhyn
John Young	c. 1762	London	20 Oct 1784	7		Alexander
Simon Young	c. 1762	London	21 Apr 1784	Death to 7		Scarborough
Elizabeth Youngson	c. 1772	Lancaster	1 Mar 1787	Death to 7	aka Youngster	Prince of Wales
George Youngson	c. 1767	Lancaster	1 Mar 1787	7		Prince of Wales

== See also ==
- Journals of the First Fleet
- Stories of convicts on the First Fleet
- Wallabadah, New South Wales for a garden commemorating all that were on the First Fleet.
- St John's Cemetery, Parramatta: the burial site of 50+ First Fleeters, 17 of whom are commemorated with memorial plaques.

== Bibliography ==
- Chapman, Don (1986). 1788: The People of the First Fleet. Doubleday Australia. ISBN 0868242659.
- Gillen, Mollie (1989). The Founders of Australia: a Biographical Dictionary of the First Fleet. Library of Australian History. ISBN 0908120699.
- Kenneally, Thomas (2006). The Commonwealth of Thieves. Random House Australia. ISBN 9781741666137.
