= Stories of convicts on the First Fleet =

Information about prisoners transported to New South Wales in 1787

Stories of Convicts on the First Fleet contains information about a number of convicts on the First Fleet to the penal colony of New South Wales who meet the following criteria:

- There is information about the individual following their arrival in the colony, with appropriate references, that may be of interest to readers.
- The information includes, in addition to offence, sentence and death details, a story about the activities of the individual subsequent to arrival in the colony.
- No separate Wikipedia article exists, or is likely to be written, for the individual.

== Background ==
The List of convicts on the First Fleet contains basic information about most of the 775 convicts who were on the First Fleet when it sailed. For about 93 of these individuals useful information is available, often of such volume that it is not suitable for inclusion in the "Other information" column of the list article.

Only 18 of these individuals have their own Wikipedia article, but the stories of the others are both of general interest and an integral part of the early European history of Australia. A further 12 whose names are shown in "External links" have their stories in other online sources and are not included here.

== Individual stories ==
=== Robert Bails ===
Date of birth	Place of conviction	Date of conviction	Sentence	Transport ship
c. 1766	Reading	28 February 1785	Death commuted to 14 years	Alexander

Bails was convicted of highway robbery, value 2s. Originally sentenced to death, the sentence was commuted to 14 years transportation. A police report describes Bails as "near six feet high, wears his own lank hair, pitted with the smallpox, thick lips and stout made." Bails had been discharged from his regiment of guards prior to his arrest. A native of Yorkshire, Bails was one of 12 prisoners who escaped from Reading Gaol on 30 November 1784. A£10 reward was offered for his capture. Bails was found hiding with another escapee in a barn near Shinfield on 6 December 1784.

On 30 April 1788, Bails was charged with three others with the theft of meat and was required to pay the value of the stolen property. In October 1789, Robert was sentenced to 25 lashes for insolence to John Palmer, the purser of the Sirius. In 1801 Robert was listed as an emancipist settler at Port Jackson. By 1806 Bails was listed as a Schoolmaster and in 1820 as a teacher with 25 pupils.

=== Martha Baker ===
Date of birth	Place of conviction	Date of conviction	Sentence	Transport ship
c. 1762	London	30 August 1786	7 years	Lady Penrhyn

Baker was convicted at the Old Bailey for highway robbery of a silver watch (40s), a watch key (1d), and a seal (2s), that occurred on 2 August 1786. Martha's occupation was listed as servant.

Baker married Walter Batley on 21 February 1788 at Sydney Cove. She had previously been married to Thomas Baker in England prior to her transportation. In November 1789, Baker was sent to Norfolk Island on board the Supply with her husband. By 5 February 1790, Baker was recorded as Off Stores and sharing a sow with Samuel Mobbs, with whom she cohabited on Norfolk Island. On 7 May 1792, Baker sold two pigs to the Government for £2 16s. On 2 November 1793, Baker left Norfolk Island on the Britannia bound for India.

=== Stephen Barnes ===
Date of birth	Place of conviction	Date of conviction	Sentence	Transport ship
c. 1765	York	9 July 1785	7 years	Alexander

Barnes was convicted at York for stealing a Great Coat.

He served his sentence without any incidents recorded against him and then left the Colony aboard the convict ship 'William' captained by William Folger after he completing its voyage from England, bringing Rev. Samuel Marsden to Sydney in March 1794. The 'William' took the long road back to England, apparently William went whaling. She was reported off the coast of Peru, and then on the coast of Chile in November 1794. She returned to Britain on 29 November 1795 with 64 tuns of sperm oil, 57 tuns of whale oil, and 32 cwt of whale bone.

=== William Boggis ===
Date of birth	Place of conviction	Date of conviction	Sentence	Transport ship
c. 1767	Kingston upon Thames	24 March 1784	7 years	Scarborough

Boggis, a fisherman, was tried on 3 February 1783 for stealing a sheet (3s), and was convicted with William Hubbard.

In August 1788 he received 50 lashes for gambling, in September 1788 he received 100 lashes for attempting to rape Lydia Munro, and in July 1789 received 200 lashes for stealing a shirt. In 1789 was sentenced to wear a label with the word thief upon it, and was transferred to Norfolk Island and given a plot of land after his sentence expired. He returned to Sydney sometime between the years of 1797 and 1801.

=== Joseph Buckley ===
Date of birth	Place of conviction	Date of conviction	Sentence	Transport ship
c. 1748	Dorchester	16 March 1786	7 years	Charlotte

Buckley was convicted at Dorchester of stealing a purse containing 43s on 16 March 1786. He was described by the wardens on the Dunkirk prison hulk as "tolerably decent and orderly."

Buckley left the colony in 1793 on the Kitty as a servant to the surgeons Dennis Considen and Mr Cranston.

=== Margaret Bunn ===
Date of birth	Place of conviction	Date of conviction	Sentence	Transport ship
c. 1762	London	26 April 1786	7 years	Lady Penrhyn

Bunn was convicted at the Old Bailey of stealing one linen handkerchief (6d), one cotton handkerchief (2s), and twelve halfpence (6d), and one shilling in money. Her occupation was listed as servant.

She married Thomas M'Lean on 18 March 1788. He left her upon the completion of his sentence in 1791. Bunn died in 1825.

=== Mary Burkitt ===
Date of birth	Place of conviction	Date of conviction	Sentence	Transport ship
c. 1757	London	30 August 1786	7 years	Lady Penrhyn

Burkitt, alias Martha Valentine, a.k.a. Martha/Patience/Pacence Burkitt. Convicted at the Old Bailey of stealing one handkerchief (1s), one rule (6d) and six shillings in money. Her occupation was listed as Servant.

She married James Davis on 13 February 1788 and both were sent to Norfolk Island on 2 October 1788.

=== Elizabeth Cole ===
Date of birth	Place of conviction	Date of conviction	Sentence	Transport ship
1758	Exeter	20 March 1786	7 years	Charlotte

Cole was convicted of Burglary in Exeter, Devon and sentenced to 7 years transportation. She left England on "Charlotte", but due to unruly behaviour was transferred to "Friendship" at Rio de Janeiro and then was transferred to "Prince of Wales" at the Cape of Good Hope, eventually arriving in Sydney Cove on 26 January 1788.

Elizabeth had a relationship with William ELLIS, a Marine Private on the Friendship and had the following child – Thomas COLE 9 August 1789. She was then sent to Norfolk Island on "Sirius" and arrived 6 March 1790

Elizabeth then had a relationship with James TUCKER and they had the following children – Sarah 7 September 1793 – Maria COLE 27 December 1795

Elizabeth then had a relationship with Richard Cornelius BURROWS having the following children – Ann BURROWS 8 May 1800 – John BURROWS 7 March 1803. On 3 September 1808, the Burrows family transferred to Hobart on the sailing ship City of Edinburgh and were married by the Reverend Robert Knopwood on 25 February 1810 after cohabiting together for fourteen years. Elizabeth died 31 January 1821 of natural causes.

=== Jane Creek ===
Date of birth	Place of conviction	Date of conviction	Sentence	Transport ship
	London	1785	7 years	Lady Penrhyn

Creek worked as a butcher of birds and seller of feathers. Convicted of stealing and sentenced to seven years transportation.

Worked on Norfolk Island from 1790 to 1796.

=== James Davis ===
Date of birth	Place of conviction	Date of conviction	Sentence	Transport ship
	London	8 December 1784	7 years	Scarborough

Davis was convicted at the Old Bailey of stealing from William Farrington on 28 October 1784 one man's cloth great coat (5s), one petticoat (10s), one gown (4s), one handkerchief (3s), one silk handkerchief (2s), two other handkerchiefs (2s), one pair of sheets (7s), two shirts (4s), two shifts (4s), one apron (2s), two aprons (1s 6d), two yards of white thread lace (4s) and one yard and a half of linen cloth (12d).

Davis married Mary Burkitt in February 1788 and both were sent to Norfolk Island in October.

=== Mary Dickenson ===
Date of birth	Place of conviction	Date of conviction	Sentence	Transport ship
1761	Southwark	8 January 1787	7 years	Lady Penrhyn

Dickenson was tried at the Surrey Quarter Sessions, Southwark, on 8 Jan 1787 and found guilty of stealing eleven waistcoats from the shop of Richard Marks, in the parish of St Saviour, Southwark, Surrey. She was sentenced to transportation for seven years.

She became the wife of William Eggleton on 17 Feb 1788: theirs was the 15th recorded marriage in New South Wales. They had four children, although their infant son, William (aged 1), predeceased his mother in 1792. Mary died on 25 Aug 1799 and her remains were buried in the Old Sydney Burial Ground (now the site of the Sydney Town Hall and surrounds).

=== William Eggleton (alias Bones) ===
Date of birth	Place of conviction	Date of conviction	Sentence	Transport ship
1761	Kingston upon Thames	23 March 1786	7 years	Alexander

Eggleton appeared at the Surrey Lent Assizes together with another man in connection with the theft of clothing, a chest, and a padlock from a house. He was convicted for stealing goods (value 39 shillings), though not of breaking and entering. Only some three weeks after arriving at Sydney Cove, Eggleton married fellow convict Mary Dickinson (see above). In 1791 he was one of a group of 26 men, chosen by Governor Arthur Phillip as being the most reliable convicts, who established a farming district around the area of Prospect Hill to help feed the starving colony. William went on to pursue a career in farming, receiving a 60-acre land grant at Prospect Hill in 1793, leasing land at Petersham, purchasing land at the Field of Mars, and farming at Windsor. By the mid-1810s he was working on land granted to him in the district of Airds (60 acres behind the modern Macarthur Shopping Square at Campbelltown). The 1822 NSW Muster shows him as being employed on the property of his son-in-law Robert Lack. In 1823 he received another grant of land at Bargo (50 acres).

=== Ann Fowles ===
Date of birth	Place of conviction	Date of conviction	Sentence	Transport ship
	London	16 April 1785	7 years	Lady Penrhyn

Fowles was convicted for the theft of gowns and petticoats (£2 16s).

She was transported with her four-year-old daughter Mary, who was made a ward of the state and resettled on Norfolk Island.

=== John Hadon ===
Date of birth	Place of conviction	Date of conviction	Sentence	Transport ship
c. 1756	Exeter		7 years	Charlotte

Hadon, aka Haydon, Haidon, was originally convicted with Simon Burn for highway robbery and stealing 39s on 11 August 1783. Hadon was part of the Mercury Mutiny in April 1784. There is no record of Hadon's trial following the mutiny, but he was transported once again. A report from the Dunkirk hulk describes Hadon as "troublesome at times".

In January 1789, Hadon was ordered to receive 100 lashes for being absent from work for three days.

=== Richard Hagley ===
Date of birth	Place of conviction	Date of conviction	Sentence	Transport ship
c. 1743	Winchester	2 March 1784	Death commuted to 7 years	Scarborough

Hagley, aka Agely, was convicted at Winchester for assault and highway robbery (2s). Sentenced to death, it was commuted to 7 years transportation.

Hagley married Ann Wicks in March 1792 at Port Jackson. In 1795 he was employed as a labourer in the Windsor area. In 1828 he was employed as a stock keeper in Pitt Town. Hagley died on 10 August 1841 at Windsor.

=== John Hart ===
Date of birth	Place of conviction	Date of conviction	Sentence	Transport ship
	London	12 January 1785	7 years	

Hart was convicted of stealing one linen cloth (1d), one rush basket (2d), 16lbs of mutton (6s), 3lbs of cheese (15d), 4lbs of butter (2s), 4oz of tea (15d), 2lbs of moist sugar (10d), 1lb of loaf sugar (8d). Hart was working as a porter at the time of his arrest and had recently been discharged as a Sergeant.

Hart married Flora Lara/Zarah in February 1788 in Sydney. Hart was sent to Norfolk Island in February 1789. He died there on 3 January 1795.

=== Ann Inett ===
Date of birth	Place of conviction	Date of conviction	Sentence	Transport ship
c. 1757	Worcester	11 March 1786	Death commuted to 7 years	Lady Penrhyn

Inett, a Mantua maker from Grimley, was convicted for stealing 1 petticoat (20s) with force of arms. Her death sentence was commuted to 7 years.

In February 1788, Inett was sent to Norfolk Island where she lived with Philip Gidley King, Second Lieutenant in the Royal Marines and had two sons, Norfolk and Sydney. They returned to Port Jackson in March 1790. In October King left alone for England. There he married his cousin, Anna Josepha Coombe and returned with her as Lieutenant-Governor of Norfolk Island, and later Governor of New South Wales. Probably at King's arrangement, Inett married Second Fleeter Richard John Robinson. In 1796 Inett's sons went to England with King. In 1800 Inett was given land in Parramatta where she and Robinson had an inn, the 'Yorkshire Grey'. In 1820 she left on the Admiral Cockburn. Nothing further of Inett is known.

=== Benjamin Ingram ===
Date of birth	Place of conviction	Date of conviction	Sentence	Transport ship
c. 1768	London	8 December 1784	7 years	Scarborough

Ingram, aka Ingraham, a pickpocket, was convicted for stealing one linen handkerchief (1s) on 8 November 1784. Sentenced to transportation to Africa, he was ultimately sent New South Wales.

He was sentenced to 100 lashes for stealing 2lbs of flour, and absconding in 1789. Ingram was sent to Norfolk Island in January 1790. He escaped in June and received 300 lashes. In 1792 Ingram was caught stealing and was sentenced to life on the island. On 26 January 1795, Ingram ended his life by suicide.

=== John Irvine ===
Date of birth	Place of conviction	Date of conviction	Sentence	Transport ship
c. 1761	Lincoln	6 March 1784	7 years	Scarborough

Irvine, aka Irvin, Aderson, Anderson, Law, a surgeon, was convicted for stealing a silver cup.

On the voyage and after arrival Irvine proved his worth as a surgeon. On 26 February 1790, his sentence was cancelled and all civil rights and privileges were restored, becoming the first convict to be emancipated. He was posted to Norfolk Island as Assistant Surgeon in March. In May 1791, Irvine returned to Port Jackson. He died in September 1795, before he received news of his formal appointment as Assistant Surgeon with a salary of £50 per year.

=== Edward Kimberly ===
Date of birth	Place of conviction	Date of conviction	Sentence	Transport ship
c. 1765	Coventry	20 March 1783	7 years	Scarborough

Kimberly, aka Kimberley, was convicted of Grand Larceny.

He was a Night watch member in 1805. Described by convicts in his charge as sadistic, and "considered the convicts of Norfolk island no better than heathens," and that "women were born for the convenience of men". He died in 1829.

=== Richard Lane ===
Date of birth	Place of conviction	Date of conviction	Sentence	Transport ship
	Winchester	2 March 1784	7 years	Scarborough

Lane, aka Lyne. was convicted at Winchester of stealing a watch and other goods (160s).

Lane was sent to Norfolk Island from Port Jackson in March 1790. He returned to Port Jackson in March 1793.

=== William Lane ===
Date of birth	Place of conviction	Date of conviction	Sentence	Transport ship
c. 1756	Chelmsford	28 July 1784	7 years	Scarborough

Lane, a labourer. was convicted of stealing 320lbs of pickled pork, 8lbs of salted butter, 6 gallons of shrub, 6 gallons of brandy, 6 gallons of peppermint water, three 6 gallon casks and a brass cock (5s). Lane was sentenced to transportation originally to America.

In 1790 he received two thousand lashes for stealing 13lbs of biscuits. In 1796 he received a grant of 30 acres on the banks of the Hawkesbury River. In 1802, Lane conveyed his grant to John Palmer for £50. By 1806, Lane was mustered as renting five acres of land at Richmond Hill. In 1814 he mustered as a landholder in the Liverpool district. Lane died on 30 September 1815 in Airds, New South Wales.

=== Jane Langley ===
Date of birth	Place of conviction	Date of conviction	Sentence	Transport ship
16 September 1761	London	29 July 1785	7 years	Lady Penrhyn

Langley, a tambour embroider, was convicted (with Mary Phyn) of stealing £5 9s 6d in September 1785. During the trial, Langley and Phyn committed perjury with the aid of a smith who lived in their street, John Jeffery Smith. Smith was later convicted on 19 October 1785 for the offence. At their trial, with the offence of perjury made clear, the Judge James Adair sentenced them to seven years transportation. She was described as tall with very curly hair, "quite a black complexioned woman, and her hair grows over her forehead all rough."

Langley was pregnant at the time of her transportation. She gave birth to a daughter, Henrietta, in September 1787. Philip Scriven or Thomas Gilbert, the master of the Lady Penrhyn, is suspected to be the father. During the voyage her young son Philip travelled with her. She cohabited with Philip Scriven. She was sent to Norfolk Island in March 1790 with Henrietta. She later married Thomas Chipp, a marine. The couple had 7 children together and left Norfolk Island in 1794. She died on 18 February 1836.

=== David Lankey ===
Date of birth	Place of conviction	Date of conviction	Sentence	Transport ship
c. 1760	London	26 May 1784	7 years	Scarborough

Lankey, a tailor, was convicted at the Old Bailey of stealing one silk handkerchief (2s).

Lankey was sent to Norfolk Island in March 1790. In June 1790 he was sentenced to 300 lashes for absconding. Lankey returned to Port Jackson in 1791 where he worked as a tailor for many years.

=== Flora Lara ===
Date of birth	Place of conviction	Date of conviction	Sentence	Transport ship
	London	21 January 1787	7 years	Prince of Wales

Lara, aka Zarah, was convicted for stealing a Mahogany tea chest and money (5s). She was described in the court records as "an evil disposed person".

Lara married John Hart in Sydney in February 1788. She was sent to Norfolk Island in November 1789, following John who had been sent in February of that year. She returned to Port Jackson some time before 1814, when she was mustered at Parramatta.

=== James Larne ===
Date of birth	Place of conviction	Date of conviction	Sentence	Transport ship
	Exeter	12 July 1785	7 years	Charlotte

Larne, aka La Rue, was convicted for an unknown felony. Reports from Dunkirk hulk state that Larne was "troublesome at times".

In 1791, Larne was on Norfolk Island. That same year, Larne received 50 lashes for theft. In November Larne was caught robbing a house and received 546 of 800 lashes ordered and had his ration of flour limited to five pounds per week as well, he was required to work for one month in heavy irons. In February 1805, James was listed in the Norfolk Island muster as a vagrant. In 1808, Larne went to Van Diemens Land on the City of Edinburgh. He died of exposure while intoxicated on 20 July 1816. His death was reported in the "Hobart Town Gazette" as "Jemmy La Rou, a poor maniac whose death was occasioned by being exposed to the severities of the weather in a state of intoxication. He was a poor harmless being."

=== Henry Lavell ===
Date of birth	Place of conviction	Date of conviction	Sentence	Transport ship
	London	11 September 1782	Death commuted to life	Friendship

Lavell, aka Lovell, an Ivory Turner and servant, was convicted for counterfeiting £10 10s. He was defended by John Silvester, but was sentenced to death. Lavell's sentence was later commuted to transportation for life. Lavell was involved in the Mercury Mutiny. During his incarceration in the Dunkirk hulk, Lavell's behaviour was described as "in general tolerably well behaved but troublesome at times."

In February 1788 Lavell stole food from public stores. Lavell was sentenced to hang for this, but the decision was changed to banishment and he was eventually confined in irons on Pinchgut Island in Sydney Harbour. He was released on the King's Birthday in June 1788. In January 1790 Lavell was sent to Norfolk Island, and returned to Port Jackson in March 1793. In 1801 Lavell was listed as having returned to England after receiving a full pardon.

=== John Lawrell ===
Date of birth	Place of conviction	Date of conviction	Sentence	Transport ship
	Bodmin	18 August 1783	7 years	Scarborough

Lawrell was convicted of stealing a silver table spoon (5s). He was described as "sometimes troublesome" on the Dunkirk Hulk.

Lawrell was sent to Norfolk Island in February 1789. In August 1789, he could only receive 61 of 100 lashes ordered for gambling on Sunday. He received remaining 39 lashes in September. Lawrell returned to Port Jackson in 1791. In 1792, he established a farm at Eastern Farms. Lawrell died on 23 February 1796 at Mulgrave Place.

=== Mary Lawrence ===
Date of birth	Place of conviction	Date of conviction	Sentence	Transport ship
c. 1754	London	26 May 1784	7 years	Lady Penrhyn

Lawrence was convicted for stealing one pair of silver salt spoons (3s), five silver table spoons (30s), two silver tea spoons (2s), one pair of tea tongs (3s), a silk gown (15s), two muslin gowns (20s), one muslin petticoat (20s), one pair of stone buckles (2s), a shagreen case (2d), a gold locket (2s), two gold mourning rings (4s), two silk cloaks (5s), one camblet cloak (1s), two linen table cloths (2s), from Lillias Warden, from Elizabeth Delayne one silk gown (10s), and one muslin apron (2s), and from Ann Pearson one satin petticoat (3s), one cotton gown (3s) and one dimity petticoat (2s) on 21 April 1784. She was sentenced to 7 years transportation. She was married to a man named John Lawrence.

In New South Wales, Lawrence married William Worsdell in May 1788. She died in Sydney on 17 May 1804.

=== Caroline Laycock ===
Date of birth	Place of conviction	Date of conviction	Sentence	Transport ship
	London	30 March 1785	7 years	Prince of Wales

Laycock, aka Haycock, was convicted for petty larceny.

Laycock had a daughter by a sailor, who was baptised in September 1788. She was listed as having cohabited with a number of people in New South Wales; Robert Hosborn, Robert Bruce, Mark Turner, William Shepherd, William Smyth and Henry Heatley. In July 1789 Laycock was sentenced to 50 lashes for helping William Boggis steal a shirt. Laycock had a daughter by Robert Bruce in 1790. She also bore three sons to a second fleeter Mark Turner. Laycock married Henry Heatley in May 1810 but separated from him in 1814. She died in Sydney Hospital on 17 March 1830.

=== Jeremiah Leary ===
Date of birth	Place of conviction	Date of conviction	Sentence	Transport ship
	Bristol	30 March 1784	Death commuted to 14 years	Friendship

Leary was convicted with Thomas Jones for breaking, entering and stealing.

He was sent to Norfolk Island in March 1790 and received the order to run "the Gauntlet among the Convicts" for theft in March 1790. Leary died on Norfolk Island on 18 December 1807.

=== John Leary ===
Date of birth	Place of conviction	Date of conviction	Sentence	Transport ship
	Winchester	3 March 1783	Death commuted to 7 years	Scarborough

Leary was convicted at Winchester of assault and robbery of 133s upon the King's highway with Joseph Morley, Francis Garland and Henry Roach. Originally sentenced to death, Leary's sentence was commuted to 7 years transportation.

He married Mary Jackson in February 1788 at Sydney Cove. Leary was accused of beating his wife and they were ordered separated for a period of time in 1789. Leary left New South Wales in 1791.

=== Elizabeth Lee ===
Date of birth	Place of conviction	Date of conviction	Sentence	Transport ship
	London	23 February 1785	7 years	Lady Penrhyn

Lee, a cook, was convicted for stealing, on 4 January 1785, 30 gallons of wine, called Red Port (£10), 12 gallons of other wine, called Malmsey Madeira (£12), 3 gallons of White Port (20s), 3 gallons of Malmsey Madeira (40s), 3 gallons of Claret (40s), 3 gallons of raisin wine (6s), 3 gallons of orange wine (6s), 3 gallons of Brandy (36s), 3 gallons of rum (36s), 3 gallons of Geneva (20s), one gallon of Arrack (16s), 424 glass bottles (£3 10s), 100 weight of tallow candles (50s), 2 linen stocks (4s), 2 pairs of stockings (5s), one gold ring with garnets (10s), and 2 crown pieces (10s). Lee was defended by William Garrow at her trial.

Lee was transferred to Norfolk Island in February 1788. She left Norfolk Island in April 1793 aboard the Chesterfield, bound for Bengal via Port Jackson.

=== George Legg ===
Date of birth	Place of conviction	Date of conviction	Sentence	Transport ship
	Dorchester	16 March 1786	7 years	Charlotte

Legg, aka Legge, a shoemaker, was convicted for stealing a gold watch and other goods (140s). A report from the Dunkirk hulk described Legg as "tolerably decent and orderly".

In January 1789 Legg was sentenced to receive 100 lashes for illegally disposing of 2 chickens he did not own. In February 1790, he was sent to Norfolk Island. There he married Ann Armsden. Legg returned to Port Jackson with Armsden in July 1794. Legg was a Night Watch member. He died on 9 June 1807 during a storm, his remains were found in late July and buried on the 24th.

=== Stephen Legrove ===
Date of birth	Place of conviction	Date of conviction	Sentence	Transport ship
	London	14 January 1784	7 years	Friendship

Legrove, a waterman on the Thames, was convicted for stealing, on 9 December 1783, 118 Norwegian deal boards (£10). Legrove was defended by John Silvester and prosecuted by William Garrow. Legrove was involved in the Mercury Mutiny in April 1784 and returned to England, landing at Torbay, where he was recaptured. A report from the Dunkirk hulk describes Stephen as a "quiet" prisoner. He was later sent to New South Wales.

Legrove received 50 lashes in March 1789 for being absent from work. He was a Night Watch member in August 1789. Legrove left New South Wales as a free man on 28 December 1791. His ship, the Matilda struck a shoal and sank on its way to Peru. The survivors headed for Tahiti using four of the small boats. In April 1792, William Bligh made landfall at Tahiti in HMS Providence and rescued the survivors from Matilda, Stephen Legrove was among those taken on board. He was offloaded at the end of the voyage at Deptford, England, on 8 August 1793. There is no trace of Legrove in records after this date.

=== Elizabeth Leonard ===
Date of birth	Place of conviction	Date of conviction	Sentence	Transport ship
c. 1760	London	20 October 1784	7 years	Lady Penrhyn

Leonard, aka Leonell, a servant, was convicted of assaulting and stealing 4s from another prisoner on 23 September 1784 whilst being held at New Prison, Clerkenwell. Originally sentenced to death, Leonard's sentence was commuted to 7 years transportation.

She married John Cullyhorn/Callahan in February 1788 at Sydney Cove. However, she left Cullyhorn to live with another man named John Curran. In January 1805, Curran charged Leonard with stripping all movable contents from their home. She was ordered to work for the Crown for two years and sent to Van Diemens Land. She died on 20 May 1807, and was buried St David's, Hobart.

=== Amelia Levy ===
Date of birth	Place of conviction	Date of conviction	Sentence	Transport ship
	Southwark	9 June 1787	7 years	Lady Penrhyn

Levy, aka Mary Levy, a furrier, was convicted with Ann Martin at Southwark for stealing silk handkerchiefs. She was described as Jewish.

In January 1789, Levy admitted to the theft of a white linen shift and was sentenced to 50 lashes spread out over three consecutive Saturdays. In November Levy received an additional 50 lashes for abusing Marine Sergeant Clayfield. In March 1790, Levy was sent to Norfolk Island. She married William Knight at Norfolk Island, and left aboard the Francis for Port Jackson in July 1794. No further record of Levy or her husband has been traced since.

=== Joseph Levy ===
Date of birth	Place of conviction	Date of conviction	Sentence	Transport ship
	London	26 May 1784	7 years	Scarborough

Levy was convicted for stealing on 1 May 1784 one copper kettle (8s).

In February 1788, Levy was charged with insolence to William Parr, a convict overseer. Levy was sentenced to 100 lashes but this was later forgiven. He died on 15 April 1788 at Port Jackson, and was said to be the first Jew to be buried in Australia.

=== Sophia Lewis ===
Date of birth	Place of conviction	Date of conviction	Sentence	Transport ship
	London	25 October 1786	Death commuted to 7 years	Lady Penrhyn

Lewis was convicted for stealing on 22 October 1786 one cambrick handkerchief (1s), one linen ditto (1s), a coat (40s), a pen-knife (6d), a green silk purse (6d), two guineas (£2 2s), and 14s and 6d in money. Lewis was alluded to being prostitute during the trial.

She married James Walbourne in March 1788 at Port Jackson. Walbourne and Lewis has two sons, William and James, and were sent to Norfolk Island in November 1791. Walbourne was charged with assaulting his wife in 1800, and they were ordered to divide their property and live apart, each with one child. Lewis took James, and Walbourne took William. Lewis did not accompany her husband when he left the colony for Ceylon in 1814. Lewis, having previously attempted suicide, ended her life at Cockle Bay near Dawes Point on 3 December 1816.

=== Samuel Lightfoot ===
Date of birth	Place of conviction	Date of conviction	Sentence	Transport ship
c. 1753	Exeter	14 March 1785	Death commuted to 7 years	Charlotte

Lightfoot was convicted at Exeter for stealing 5 linen shirts and 5 linen handkerchiefs (81s). Originally sentenced to death, his sentence was commuted to 7 years transportation. A report from Dunkirk hulk notes that Lightfoot had behaved "remarkably well."

Lightfoot returned to England after his sentence had expired around 1792. He petitioned to return to New South Wales as a settler, with his wife. In February 1794, Samuel received a 30-acre land grant on the north side of the harbour opposite Sydney Cove. Samuel and his wife arrived in the colony in 1803 aboard the Calcutta. He went to Van Diemens Land in 1804. In April 1810, Lightfoot is recorded as an overseer in Hobart. He died there on 17 May 1818.

=== John Limeburner ===
Date of birth	Place of conviction	Date of conviction	Sentence	Transport ship
c. 1743	New Sarum	9 July 1785	7 years	Charlotte

Limeburner was convicted at Salisbury for stealing a waistcoat, linen shirt and stockings (20s). Originally sentenced to death, Limeburner's sentence was commuted to seven years transportation. A report from the Dunkirk hulk described John as "tolerably decent and orderly."

Limeburner married Elizabeth Ireland in September 1790 at Rosehill. Limeburner died at Ashfield on 2 September 1847, aged 104. He was the oldest colonist and last first fleeter in Sydney.

=== Thomas Limpus ===
Date of birth	Place of conviction	Date of conviction	Sentence	Transport ship
23 July 1760	London	10 September 1783	Life	

Limpus was previously convicted in 1777 of the theft of a handkerchief and sentenced to 3 years hard labour. Due to the rebellion of the American colonies, the British government were unable to find a place beyond the seas to send convicts sentenced to transportation, so Limpus was returned to dry land by 1780. On 8 October 1782, Limpus was before William Mainwairing to 7 years transportation to Africa for theft of a cambrick handkerchief (10d). Limpus was transported on the Benkiasa and was landed at the island of Gorée on the west coast of Africa on 3 December 1782. Many convicts died in Africa, and those who survived proved too unruly for soldiery and managing the region. Subsequently, transportation to Africa became seen as little more than tantamount to a death sentence.

Limpus escaped on a British ship and returned to England in 1783. Limpus was recaptured in London in October 1783. He was convicted for returning from transportation. Limpus was found guilty of returning from transportation at his trial and sentenced to death, but was later commuted to transportation for life in America. Limpus' second transportation was bound for Nova Scotia. He was involved in the Mercury Mutiny in April 1784 and returned to England. Limpus was recaptured in Devon, his trial for returning from transportation sentenced him to death once again but this was commuted to transportation for life. Whilst held in the Dunkirk prison hulk, he was described as a "quiet prisoner."

Limpus was sent to Norfolk Island in March 1790. In September 1796, he received a conditional pardon. He died in 1801.

=== George List ===
Date of birth	Place of conviction	Date of conviction	Sentence	Transport ship
c.1759	London	10 September 1783	Life	Scarborough

List, aka Lisk, a watchmaker, was convicted at the Old Bailey for assault on the King's highway (whilst aiding a robbery).

In July 1791 List established a farm on a 30-acre grant at Prospect Hill. He married Rose Burke in 1793 at Parramatta. In 1800 List was working a farm in Hawkesbury with William Butler. List and Butler sold the farm in 1805 and List returned to Britain in July 1805 aboard the Ferret.

=== Elizabeth Lock ===
Date of birth	Place of conviction	Date of conviction	Sentence	Transport ship
	Gloucester	26 March 1783	7 years	Lady Penrhyn

Lock, a servant, was convicted for burglary of 11s.

Lock married Richard Morgan in March 1788 at Port Jackson. Richard was sent to Norfolk Island in January 1790. Lock followed him in March. Morgan and Lock did not reunite on Norfolk Island, as he had started living with another woman there. Elizabeth began cohabiting with a marine, Thomas Scully. Scully left Norfolk Island in 1795. Lock may have gone with him because the last record of her was that year.

=== John Lockley ===
Date of birth	Place of conviction	Date of conviction	Sentence	Transport ship
	London	22 February 1786	Death commuted to 7 years	Alexander

Lockley, a watchmaker, was convicted for stealing 12 sets of silver watch cases (£5), and one bag (1d). Lockley was originally sentenced to death but was probably granted a last-minute reprieve. He was defended by William Garrow at his trial.

In March 1790 he was sent to Norfolk Island. In December 1807, Lockley went to Van Diemens Land. He drowned there on 16 April 1808.

=== Joseph Long ===
Date of birth	Place of conviction	Date of conviction	Sentence	Transport ship
	Gloucester	23 March 1785	Death commuted to 14 years	Alexander

Long was convicted at Gloucester for stealing one silver watch (40s).

In October 1788, Long was sent to Norfolk Island. In January 1789, Long received 12 lashes for being absent from work. In October he received 100 lashes for lending shoes he was supposed to have been mending. Long died on Norfolk Island on 15 June 1793.

Love was convicted with Elizabeth Bird for receiving stolen goods. Love was a widow and about 60 at the time of her conviction.

=== Ann Lynch ===
Date of birth	Place of conviction	Date of conviction	Sentence	Transport ship
1746	Bristol	30 March 1786	14 years	Charlotte

Lynch was convicted for receiving stolen goods.

Lynch cohabited and had a son with a marine, Thomas Cotterell. In 1790, Lynch and her son were sent to Norfolk Island, after which she had no further association with Cotterell. On Norfolk Island, Lynch cohabited and married another marine, Thomas Williams. Williams received a grant of 60 acres at Creswell Bay in February 1792. In September 1793, Williams was listed as a constable in the Creswell Bay and West Point streams area and also worked as a miller. By 1814 Williams and Lynch were living together in the Sydney area, although Ann does not appear with him in the 1821 register. In September 1823, Lynch appears in the Muster but she disappears before the 1828 Muster. On 19 November 1823, a woman known as "Ann Williams" is listed in the New South Wales State Records as being admitted to hospital.

=== Humphrey Lynch ===
Date of birth	Place of conviction	Date of conviction	Sentence	Transport ship
	New Sarum	5 March 1785	7 years	Alexander

Lynch, a tailor, was convicted for assault with a stick and highway robbery. Originally sentenced to death, Lynch's sentenced was commuted to 7 years transportation.

In March 1790, Lynch was sent to Norfolk Island. In June 1794, Lynch is listed as living with Second Fleeter Ann Stokes on a farm at Queenborough, Norfolk Island. In November 1807, Lynch and Stokes went to Van Diemens Land. Lynch was granted 30 acres in the Clarence Plains region. On 26 February 1816 Stokes died. A newspaper reported that Humphrey had bequeathed some sheep to a daughter. She has not been identified and may have been adopted. Lynch committed suicide by hanging from a tree on 31 December 1817.

=== James M'Donnaugh ===
Date of birth	Place of conviction	Date of conviction	Sentence	Transport ship
1752	Maidstone	11 July 1785	7 years	Alexander

M'Donnaugh, aka McDonaugh, a labourer, was convicted with Thomas Matson for the theft of a Leaden pipe (£2 or 40s).

M'Donnaugh was sentenced in September 1790 to 200 lashes and to wear an iron collar for six months. He died in 1791, possibly suicide by hanging.

=== Charles M'Laughlin ===
Date of birth	Place of conviction	Date of conviction	Sentence	Transport ship
c. 1770	Durham	21 July 1785	7 years	Alexander

M'Laughlin, aka McLaughlin, McLellan, McLennan, MacLaulin, from Devon, was convicted at Durham for the theft of a purse (1s), containing 14s 6d.

He was one of the initial settlers of Norfolk Island in February 1788. In April M'Laughlin received 36 lashes for theft of rum, in May 36 lashes for "seditious and threatening words," and in August 36 lashes for stealing eggs. M'Laughlin received a fractured skull in May 1790 and was not expected to live. He was sentenced in May 1791 to 6 weeks in irons on 2 weeks ration of corn and water for stealing potatoes, but punishment ceased on 12 June. M'Laughlin is marked as having left the colony in January 1793.

=== Francis M'Lean ===
Date of birth	Place of conviction	Date of conviction	Sentence	Transport ship
	Guildford	24 March 1784	7 years	Alexander

M'Lean, aka MacLean, McLean, a labourer, was convicted with his brother Thomas M'Lean for burglary of items (63s). Originally sentenced to death, overturned to seven years transportation to America. They escaped and were tried once again together for being at large before the expiration of their sentence.

In April 1788 25 lashes were ordered against M'Lean for refusing to obey an order, however, the punishment was forgiven. Both brothers left the colony in 1791, their sentences having expired.

=== Thomas M'Lean ===
Date of birth	Place of conviction	Date of conviction	Sentence	Transport ship
	Guildford		7 years	Alexander

M'Lean, aka MacLean, McLean, a labourer, was convicted with his brother Francis M'Lean for burglary of items (63s). Originally sentenced to death, overturned to seven years transportation to America. They escaped and were tried once again together for being at large before the expiration of their sentence.

M'Lean married Margaret Bunn in March 1788. Both brothers left the colony in 1791, their sentences having expired. M'Lean left Margaret behind.

=== James Morrisby ===
Date of birth	Place of conviction	Date of conviction	Sentence	Transport ship
	London	7 July 1784	7 years	Scarborough

James Morrisby was born on 23 January 1757 at Cawood on the River Ouse between Selby and York in North Yorkshire, England. The Morrisbys were wealthy and influential as Lords of Morrisby in Cumberland in the UK for 500 years until 1499. There were 17 knights in direct succession. James was a blacksmith by trade. He then enlisted in the Scots Guards on 4 May 1776, aged 19 years. He was five foot seven inches tall with brown eyes and wore a black hat, red coat and white trousers while stationed at the Tower of London.

On 6 July 1784 at the age of 27, James was apprehended for attempting to remove an iron bar with a weight of ten pounds and value of 10 pennies or four pence (about eight cents) from a house in St Paul's churchyard. A day later he was sentenced at the Old Bailey in London to seven years transportation. Two months later he was placed on the Censor hulk ship which held convicts at Newgate. He spent two and half years on the stinking hulk before being transferred to Portsmouth. On 27 February 1787 he saw the shores of England and his first wife and daughter for the last time, setting sail on the Scarborough as part of eleven ships of the First Fleet. He was one of 717 convicts under the command of Captain Arthur Philip and travelled via Tenerife, Rio de Janeiro and Cape Town, arriving in Botany Bay on a very hot January the 18th 1788.

Three months later he was sent to Norfolk Island, home of the famous pine trees, where he became a model settler and in July 1791 at the end of his transportation term became a free settler and farmer owning 12 acres of land. In November 1791, James married another convict Anne Brooks and in 1802 he became a constable. He left Norfolk Island as part of its forced closure aboard the Porpoise on Boxing Day 1807. With his second wife and five children, and about to turn 50, he gave up a house, large assets and successful farm in exchange for 80 acres of virgin land at Clarence Plains east of Hobart in Tasmania, when it was known as Van Diemen's Land. He called his new home Belmont Lawn which overlooked the beautiful Ralph's Bay in the River Derwent. He died in 1839, aged 82 years, a wealthy and well respected farmer and has a large gravestone at St Matthews of Clarence Plains Church in Rokeby, Tasmania.

=== John O'Craft ===
Date of birth	Place of conviction	Date of conviction	Sentence	Transport ship
c.1750	Exeter	24 May 1784	Death commuted to 7 years	Charlotte

O'Çraft, aka John Oakraft, was convicted of stealing one pair leather breeches and money (80s) on 17 Mar 1783. In March 1784 O'Craft was involved in the Mercury Mutiny, in which convicts rose up against the crew and returned to England. He escaped to Stoke, Plymouth before being recaptured. On 24 May 1784 O'Craft was sentenced to death for returning from transportation, but this was commuted to 7 years transportation on 9 June 1784. Reports from Dunkirk hulk was that he had behaved "remarkably well".

In March 1791, O'Craft was appointed principal of the night watch at Parramatta. In August 1792 he established a farm on a 30-acre grant at Prospect Hill.

=== Thomas Oldfield ===
Date of birth	Place of conviction	Date of conviction	Sentence	Transport ship
c. May 1763	Manchester	20 July 1786	7 years	Friendship

Oldfield, a labourer and woolen dresser born in Skipton, was convicted (with his sister Isabella Oldfield) of stealing three pieces of cloth (1s) shilling.

By March 1789, Oldfield was a member of the Night Watch at Port Jackson. In October 1793, Oldfield left the colony on the Boddingtons, bound for Bengal.

=== Peter Opley ===
Date of birth	Place of conviction	Date of conviction	Sentence	Transport ship
	Maidstone	14 March 1786	7 years	Alexander

Opley, aka Hopley, a butcher, was convicted for stealing one woman's printed gown (9s). His religion was listed as Jewish.

In April 1788, Opley was sentenced to 100 lashes for theft, next January he was sentenced to 100 lashes for being absent 3 days from the camp and in March he was sentenced to 25 lashes for stealing bread. In March 1790 Opley was sent to Norfolk Island. Within a year, Opley had become self-sufficient and took himself off rations. In 1793 he took out a three-year lease for land on the island and in 1796 he left for Europe.

=== Thomas Orford ===
Date of birth	Place of conviction	Date of conviction	Sentence	Transport ship
	London	7 July 1784	7 years	

Orford was convicted of stealing a man's hat (6d), a sheet (10s), a bed-gown (2s), three shifts (6d), ten shirts (4s), ten handkerchiefs (5s), and three children's aprons (6d). Orford claimed that he came from on board a ship where "a man gave me a pint of beer to carry these to a house." The man said the items, "were to go into the country". Orford was found guilty of stealing the property, but not the burglary. He was listed to be transported to Africa. Orford was described as "a black" who spoke broken English.

He married Elizabeth Osborne in March 1788 at Port Jackson. In April 1794, he received a 30-acre land grant at Bulanaming.

=== William Parr ===
Date of birth	Place of conviction	Date of conviction	Sentence	Transport ship
	Liverpool		7 years	Alexander

Parr's full name was Thomas William Parr, a known swindler. Aged 47 on embarkation, he was convicted of cheating a storekeeper.

Soon after arrival in the colony he married Mary McCormack, a convict who had travelled on the Friendship, another ship of the First Fleet. Despite his reputation for criminal behaviour, Parr was employed in the government store where spirits were issued, probably due to his ability as a clerk. In May 1788 he was flogged for misusing his position, and again in 1790 for theft. By 1791 he had been granted 50 acres (20 ha) of land, and had made improvements as required by the terms of the grant. He was visited on the land by Watkin Tench, a government official and author, who found him to be a hard worker but not satisfied with farming work. A research paper by the Australia and New Zealand School of Government (ANSOG) in 2017 reported that by 1793 he and his wife had saved enough money to buy a passage to England.

It is believed by his unnamed biographer that Parr was employed as a sketch artist by John White, the Surgeon-General, to produce natural history drawings. It is also known that he did art work on commission for other customers. In 1814 he sued a publisher named Absalom West for £40 which he claimed West owed him for making four commissioned drawings of Sydney. While the quantity and quality of his work is unknown, and was criticised by some of his fellow artists, he is now accepted by Design and Art Australia Online as a member of the colonial art profession.

A convict named William Parr, aged 39 years, arrived in the colony on the Fortune in 1813. He was a land surveyor and draughtsman by profession, and was employed on arrival as a mineral surveyor. In 1817 he took part in two separate journeys of exploration. In some sources these activities have been incorrectly credited to the older Parr (who would have been about 76 years of age in 1817).

=== Ann Parsely ===
Date of birth	Place of conviction	Date of conviction	Sentence	Transport ship
	London	1787	7 years	Prince of Wales

Parsley was sentenced to 7 years transportation for stealing.

In 1791, she bore a son to naval lieutenant James Furzer. She settled in Sydney on expiry of her jail term.

=== Mary Phillips ===
Date of birth	Place of conviction	Date of conviction	Sentence	Transport ship
c. 1768	Taunton	20 March 1786	7 years	Prince of Wales

Phillips was convicted on 20 Mar 1786 at Taunton, Somerset of Break /Enter /theft value 18 shillings. Ordered to the hulk Dunkirk 13 Apr 1786. Sailed from Portsmouth 13 May 1787 per Charlotte, transferred at Rio to Friendship, transferred at Cape of Good Hope to Prince of Wales.

She had a son James McDonald in 1789 to Private Alexander McDonald. Had daughter Sarah Spencer Phillips in 1791 to soldier Thomas Spencer. Had son John Stevens in 1793 and daughter Elizabeth Stevens in 1796 to Private James Riley. Had daughter Mary Stevens in 1809 to convict Thomas Stevens. Died 22 Jan 1850 buried Longford, Tasmania.

=== Mary Springham ===
Date of birth	Place of conviction	Date of conviction	Sentence	Transport ship
29 February 1768	London	25 October 1786	7 years	Lady Penrhyn

Springham, a hawker, was convicted for stealing cash and a snuff-box, value 51s.

She gave birth to three children in the colony and on went to Norfolk Island and she died there.

=== James Underwood ===
Date of birth	Place of conviction	Date of conviction	Sentence	Transport ship
c. 1743	New Sarum	11 March 1786	Death commuted to 14 years	Charlotte

Underwood was convicted for stealing 5 sheep with intent to steal fat & kidneys (100s). Underwood was described in a report from the Dunkirk Hulk as "tolerably decent and orderly."

This James Underwood should not be confused with the Third Fleeter of the same name who was a shipwright and became very successful in the colony. On 4 July 1788, he was marked as "Run from the Colony" and he does not appear in later records.

=== John Usher ===
Date of birth	Place of conviction	Date of conviction	Sentence	Transport ship
c. 1769	Maidstone	17 March 1785	7 years	Alexander

Usher, a jeweller, was convicted for stealing 5 yards of linen (39s).

In March 1790, he was sent to Norfolk Island where he lived with Margaret Carter, a Second Fleeter. They had a son John Carter, born on Norfolk Island in 1792. Margaret died on Norfolk Island in 1796. In October 1796, Usher was employed as an overseer. He returned to Port Jackson in 1801. No further records can be traced of him.

=== William Vickery ===
Date of birth	Place of conviction	Date of conviction	Sentence	Transport ship
c. 1762	Exeter	20 March 1786	7 years	Charlotte

Vickery was convicted for stealing money (120s). A report from the Dunkirk hulk described Vickery as "tolerably decent and orderly".

In March 1790, Vickery was sent to Norfolk Island. In July 1808 Vickery left Norfolk Island as a Third Class Settler, bound for Van Diemens Land. There held 30 acres at Clarence Plains, where he died on 28 November 1828.

=== Charles Williams ===
Date of birth	Place of conviction	Date of conviction	Sentence	Transport ship
	London		7 years	

Charles Williams alias Christopher Magee / Christopher McGee worked, most likely as a convict, in the American colonies for eight years. On his return to London, he was again tried and convicted and sentenced to transportation. By then, though, the American colonies had declared their independence and America was no longer the destination for convicts under sentence of transportation, so Christopher alias Charles instead sailed with the First Fleet per Scarborough (1788) to a new penal colony: the Colony of New South Wales.

He married fellow First Fleeter Eleanor McCabe and they went on to have two children: James Magee and Mary Magee. James died aged approximately 2 months old and became the first person buried at the Parramatta Burial Ground. (St. John's Cemetery, Parramatta), and Mary drowned in the Parramatta River near Breakfast Point along with her pregnant mother Eleanor and a convict named Mary Green. Christopher buried his wife, daughter and unborn child in unconsecrated ground metres from his doorstep on his farm at Camellia, overlooking the Parramatta River. Christopher alias Charles had been the first to receive a land grant at Camellia. Later, he joined shipmate and neighbour James Ruse to become the first European farmers to work the land in the Hawkesbury. Christopher alias Charles was buried at St. Matthew's Cemetery, Windsor, in 1815, aged 52.

=== John Williams (Black Jack) ===
Date of birth	Place of conviction	Date of conviction	Sentence	Transport ship
		1784	7 years	Scarborough

At 17 years of age, John found himself aboard the Scarborough bound for New South Wales. He was originally sentenced to death for the theft of some alcohol, two silver spoons, a coat & a pounds worth of halfpenny pieces. Due to his age, his sentence was commuted to transportation to America, this was then changed. Once in New South Wales, John stowed away twice before getting caught. He lived into his 80s and was buried in a cemetery in Parramatta.

== See also ==
- Journals of the First Fleet

Below is a list of convicts on the First Fleet, not included in this article, who each have their own Wikipedia article:

- Ruth Baldwin
- Thomas Barrett
- John Baughan
- Sarah Bellamy
- James Bloodsworth
- Mary Broad
- John Caesar
- Margaret Dawson
- Dorothy Handland
- Henry Kable
- Nathaniel Lucas
- James Martyn
- Elizabeth Pulley
- Anthony Rope
- James Ruse
- Robert Sidaway
- James Squire
- Elizabeth Thackery

== Bibliography ==
- Chapman, Don (1986). 1788: The People of the First Fleet. Doubleday Australia. ISBN 0868242659.
- Gillen, Mollie (1989). The Founders of Australia: a Biographical Dictionary of the First Fleet. Library of Australian History. ISBN 0908120699.
- Kenneally, Thomas (2006). The Commonwealth of Thieves. Random House Australia. ISBN 9781741666137.
