= Emancipist =

Australian transported convict who has been pardoned

An emancipist was a convict sentenced and transported under the convict system to Australia, who had been emancipated by the Governor. The term was also used to refer to free settlers who supported full civil rights for emancipated convicts. It is well understood the term Emancipist, in the Australian sense is someone who was elevated from their 'convict' social class. There were no more Emancipist elevated after Governor Macquarie.

An emancipist was free to own land and was expected to no longer be subject to social discrimination. An emancipist could be released from their sentence for diligent work, although it did not change their working conditions, the position they obtained in the colony was the driving motivator of emancipation, such as surgeon, administrative clerk ect.

The Exclusives (who included many free settlers, civil servants and military officers) often shunned the society of emancipists, and considered them to be the lowest Europeans social class, convicts. When Governor Lachlan Macquarie invited emancipists to social functions at Government House, for example, many military officers refused to attend.

Macquarie (Governor from 1810 to 1821) insisted that emancipated convicts be treated as social equals and, very conscious of the critical shortage of skills in the young colony, appointed emancipists with talent to official positions. Among these appointments were Francis Greenway as colonial architect and Dr. William Redfern as colonial surgeon. He scandalised settler opinion by appointing another emancipist, Andrew Thompson, as a magistrate.

John Irving (or Irven, Irwin, or Ervin) was Australia's first emancipist. Irving was a surgeon convicted of larceny on 6 March 1784. He was sentenced to "seven years beyond the seas," and sent on one of the First Fleet transports in 1788. After exhibiting a willing readiness to assist with his exceptional surgical skills, he was emancipated by Governor Arthur Phillip on 28 February 1790, and worked thereafter as an assistant surgeon. On 14 July 1792, Irving's Warrant of Emancipation was received in England and acknowledged by Henry Dundas, the Secretary of State.

== See also ==
- William Wentworth, Australian statesman who was the principal public proponent of the rights of emancipists
