= John Baughan =

British carpenter and convicted thief

- Born: Cherington, Warwickshire
- Baptised: 5 May 1754
- Died: 25 September 1797; Sydney
- Other names: Boughan Baughan, Boffin, Baffen, Baughn, Bingham, Buffin and Bunham
- Occupation(s): Convict carpenter and millwright
- Spouses: Catherine Morgan (m. 1774; transported 1787) Mary Cleaver (m. 1788; death 1797)
- Children: Mary (1775); Hannah (1778); Anne (1778); James (1788 – 1788); Charlotte (1789 – 1780); Charles (1790 – 1790)
- Parent(s): John Baughan/Boffin and Ann Woodley

John Baughan (1754 – 25 September 1797) was a carpenter who was convicted at Oxford, England, in 1783 as Baffen (alias Bingham and Baughan), and sentenced to be transported for 7 years for stealing 5 blankets. He was in the Mercury bound for America in 1784 when she was seized by the convicts off Torbay; he was recaptured and held at Plymouth until transferred to the First Fleet transport Friendship.

== Early life ==
John Baughan/Boffin the elder was married to Ann Woodley/Wodley on 22 June 1753 at Cherington, Warwickshire. They had five children. John the first child and he was baptised on 5 May 1754 at Cherington.

John married Catherine Morgan on 14 November 1774 at Shipton under Wychwood, Oxfordshire. They had 3 children: Mary (born 1775), Hannah (born 1778) and her twin, Anne (born 1778); they were all baptised at Whichford.

== In Sydney town ==
On 17 February 1788, Baughan (as he was mostly known in the colony) married Mary Cleaver who had been convicted at Bristol in 1786. She was transported to Sydney on Charlotte. They had 3 children, James, (baptised. 27th Mar 1788 - d. 28th Mar 1788). Charlotte, (baptised. 30 May 1789 – Aug 1780). Charles (baptised. 18th Jul 1790 - d. Aug 1790). In 1791 he was granted 50 acres (20 ha) near Parramatta but did not settle there.

1793 saw the construction of a mill at Sydney. David Collins stated:

John Baughan, an ingenious man, formerly a convict, had undertaken to build another mill upon a construction somewhat different from that of Wilkinson's, in which he was assisted by some artificers of the regiment. Both these mills were to be erected on the open spot of ground formerly used as a parade by the marine battalion.

On 24 December 1793, the millwright and Baughan had got up the frame and roof of his mill-houses and, while waiting for there being tiled, was proceeding with preparing the wood-work of his mill. February 1794 saw the laying of tiles on the mill-house. The grinding mill commenced operations on the 10 March 1794; with nine men working its capstan bar, it ran so smoothly that sixty-three pounds (29 kg) of wheat were ground in seventeen minutes. James Wilkinson's mill nearby, powered by six men who walked inside a massive wheel, commenced operations a month later; it was soon abandoned and Baughan was commissioned to replace it by another of his own design.

In recognition of his achievements as carpenter and millwright, Baughan was granted a small lease near Dawes Point. Here he erected and furnished 'a neat cottage', later acquired by Robert Campbell, and established an attractive garden. On 4 February 1796, overhearing himself being abused by a sentinel who apparently bore him an ancient grudge, Baughan slipped out of his workshop, collected his traducer's arms from his deserted post and handed them to the guard. The sentinel was immediately arrested. Next morning, as an act of reprisal, Baughan's cottage was stormed and extensively damaged by a military rabble. He and his wife 'suffered much personal outrage'. They were so sudden in the execution of this business, that the mischief was done before any steps could be taken either by the civil or military power to prevent it.

Baughan, after some days had elapsed, swearing positively to the persons of four of the principals in this transaction, a warrant was made out to apprehend them; but before it could be executed, the soldiers expressing themselves convinced of the great impropriety of their conduct, and offering to indemnify the sufferer for the damage they had done him, who also personally petitioned the Governor John Hunter in their behalf, the warrant was withdrawn.

It was observed, that the most active of the soldiers in this affair had formerly been convicts, who, not having changed their principles with their condition, thus became the means of disgracing their fellow-soldiers.

== Death ==
Although David Collins remarked on Baughan's 'sullen and vindictive disposition', he considered him 'an ingenious man'. He constructed efficient mills and neat dwellings and, until his death on 25 September 1797, officiated as foreman of carpenters in Sydney.
