= Dorothy Handland =

- Born: c. 1720/26
- Other names: Dorothy Handlyn, Dorothy Henley, Dorothy Hanland
- Occupation: Old clothes woman
- Criminal charge: Perjury
- Criminal penalty: 7 years transportation
- Spouses: Robert Grey; John Hanland

Dorothy Handland (born Dorothy Coolley; c. 1705/26 -) was perhaps the oldest convict transported on the First Fleet.

== Early life ==
On 22 September 1766, Robert Grey and Dorothy Coolley were married at St Andrew Holborn. In 1770 Robert Grey was a shoemaker and lived with his wife in Saffron Hill. On 19 February 1777 Sarah Tongue was convicted of stealing various items from Robert Grey, and received £1 1s from Tongue. At that time Grey and his wife had an old clothes shop in Saffron Hill.

On the 3 November 1781, Dorothy Grey, an illiterate widow, married John Handland, a widower, in Southwark St George the Martyr.

== Conviction ==
On 2 November 1785 at about 9 o'clock in the evening, Handland complained that she had been robbed. On 5 November Handland charged Williamm Till with robbing her. She was a lodger of Till's master, William Beach.

William Till was charged with stealing three linen gowns (£5), a silk gown (40s), three pairs of sheets (50s) a silk cloak (20s), fourteen linen handkerchiefs (20s), nine yards of thread lace (40s) the property of Handland, in the lodgings of Beach. In the trial on the 14 December 1785 it was disclosed that Handland, a widow, had remarried John "Henley", but did not live with him. Till was found not guilty before Mr Recorder, and he said there was "strong grounds to suspect this woman with her confederates," and he ordered her "to be committed on the charge of subornation of perjury".

Her trial before Mr Rose at the Old Bailey commenced on the 22 February 1786. During the trial Elizabeth Cohan, her acquaintance of sixteen years, said that "Mrs Grey" had said that "'William Till has robbed me of every thing I have in the world, I have nothing but what I stand upright in'". Cohan added that, "she said she would give me two guineas if I would go up to the house, and say I saw the man come out with a great bundle of clothes wrapped up in a sheet, and saw one or two gowns hanging out of the bundle". She was found guilty, and given the sentence of transportation for seven years.

== Transportation ==
Handland departed England on the Lady Penrhyn in 1787, aged 61. However, during the voyage Arthur Bowes Smyth estimated her age to be 82.

Handland may have been the first person to commit suicide in Australian settlement history. Robert Hughes claimed that “in 1789 a fit of despair she was to hang herself from a gum tree at Sydney Cove, thus becoming Australia’s first suicide”. However David Collins, the colony's lieutenant governor, in his book "An Account Of The English Colony In New South Wales", alluded to the fact that Handland had left the colony of Sydney on 4 June 1793 on board the Kitty bound for England with other time expired elderly convicts.

A brick cairn in the town of Coomba Park on the foreshore of Wallis Lake mentions Dorothy Handland as one of the area's early pioneers on a plaque.
