= Bloodworth (surname) =

Bloodworth is an English surname derived from Blidworth in Nottinghamshire. Notable people with the surname include:

- Dominique Bloodworth (born 1995), Dutch women's association football player
- James Bloodworth Jr. (1925–2006), American physician and pathologist
- Jimmy Bloodworth (1917–2002), American baseball player
- Margaret Bloodworth (born 1949), former Canadian National Security Advisor
- Rhoda Bloodworth (1889–1980), New Zealand labour activist, community worker and feminist
- Sir Thomas Bloodworth (1620–1682), English merchant and politician; Lord Mayor of London during the Great Fire of London (1666)
- Tom Bloodworth (1882–1974), New Zealand politician
- Timothy Bloodworth (1736–1814), American teacher and statesman from North Carolina
- Linda Bloodworth-Thomason (born 1947), American writer and television producer
- Raymond Bloodworth, American composer often associated with L. Russell Brown and Bob Crewe

== See also ==
- James Bloodsworth otherwise Bloodworth (1759–1804), English convict transported to Australia, builder
- SS Timothy Bloodworth, standard Liberty ship built for the United States Maritime Commission during World War II
