= Bloodsworth =

Bloodsworth is a surname of English origin. At the time of the British Census of 1881, its relative frequency was highest in Nottinghamshire (5.1 times the British average), followed by Lancashire, Derbyshire, Surrey, County Durham and London. In all other British counties, its relative frequency was below national average. The name Bloodsworth may refer to:

- James Bloodsworth (1759–1804), English thief sentenced to seven years transportation to Australia; responsible for much construction in Australia
- Kirk Bloodsworth (b. 1960), American man convicted of murder, then exonerated by DNA evidence

== See also ==
- Bloodsworth Island
- Bloodworth (surname)
