= James Bloodworth =

James Bloodworth may refer to:

- James Bloodworth (journalist), English journalist
- James Bloodworth Jr. (1925–2006), American physician, pathologist, and researcher
- James N. Bloodworth (1921–1980), Justice of the Supreme Court of Alabama

== See also ==
- James Bloodsworth (1759–1804), convict sentenced for the theft of one game cock and two hens
