= Macquarie Street =

Macquarie Street may refer to:

- Macquarie Street, Hobart
- Macquarie Street, Sydney

== See also ==
- Macquarie Street Gatehouse, in Parramatta, New South Wales, Australia
