= First Government House, Sydney =

Heritage-listed site in Sydney, Australia

First Government House
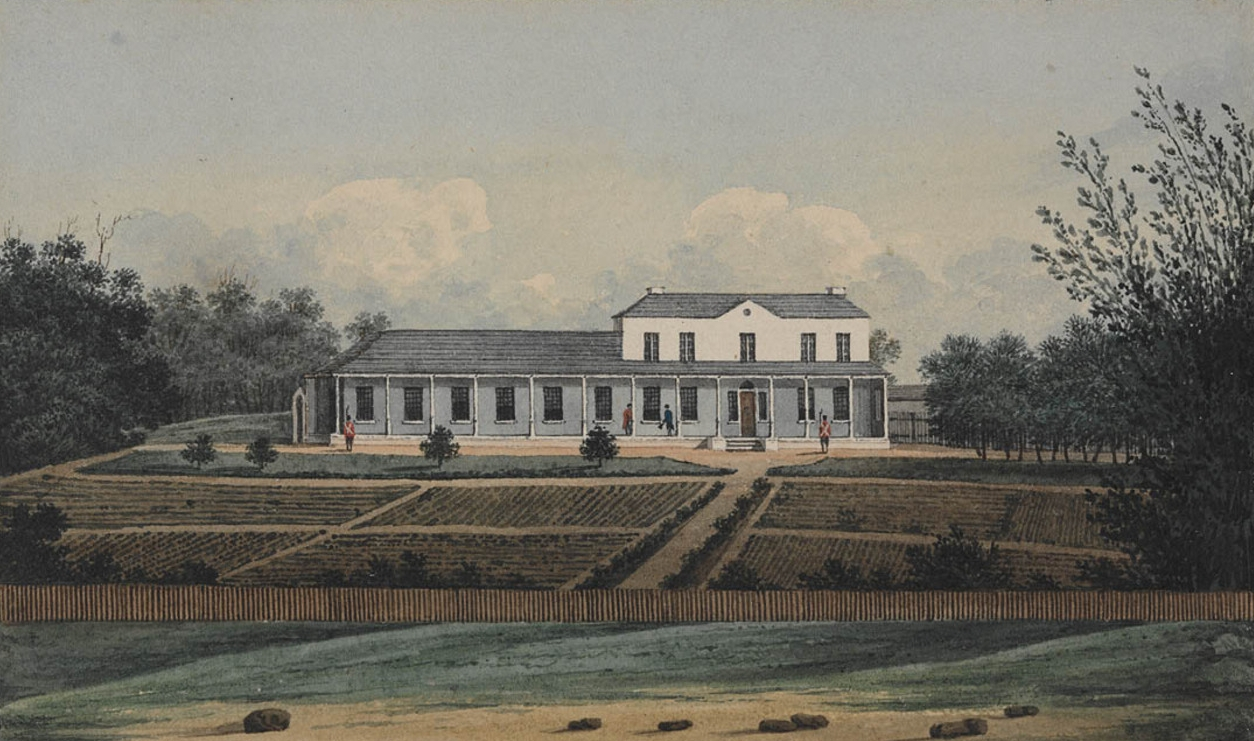
- An 1809 watercolour painting of the first government house erected in Sydney.

- Location within Sydney
- Former names: Government House
- Alternative names: Museum of Sydney site Rum Rebellion site

General information
- Status: Demolished (and replaced with Government House)
- Type: Government administration
- Architectural style: Australian Georgian; Italianate
- Location: 41 Bridge Street, Sydney CBD, New South Wales, Australia
- Coordinates: 33°51′49″S 151°12′41″E
- Construction started: May 1788
- Completed: 1789
- Demolished: 1845–1846
- Client: Colonial Governor
- Owner: Government of New South Wales

Technical details
- Material: English bricks, native stone

Design and construction
- Architects: James Bloodsworth (attrib. 1789); Francis Greenway (1810-21)

Australian National Heritage List
- Official name: First Government House Site
- Type: Historic
- Criteria: a., b., c., g., h.
- Designated: 19 August 2005
- Reference no.: 105761

New South Wales Heritage Register
- Official name: First Government House Site; Museum of Sydney; A Rum Rebellion Site
- Type: State heritage (Archaeological-Terrestrial)
- Criteria: a., c., d., e., f., g.
- Designated: 10 December 1999
- Reference no.: 1309
- Type: Government House
- Category: Government and Administration

The First Government House was the first residence for the Governors of New South Wales located at 41 Bridge Street, in the Sydney central business district in Australia. It was built from 1788 to 1789 and used until 1845, after which it was demolished in 1846. Some of the site is now occupied by the Museum of Sydney. Its construction was attributed to James Bloodsworth. It is also known as First Government House Site, Museum of Sydney and A Rum Rebellion Site (commemorating 1808 Rum Rebellion). It was added to the New South Wales State Heritage Register on 10 December 1999; and on 19 August 2005 the site was listed on the National Heritage List.

== History ==
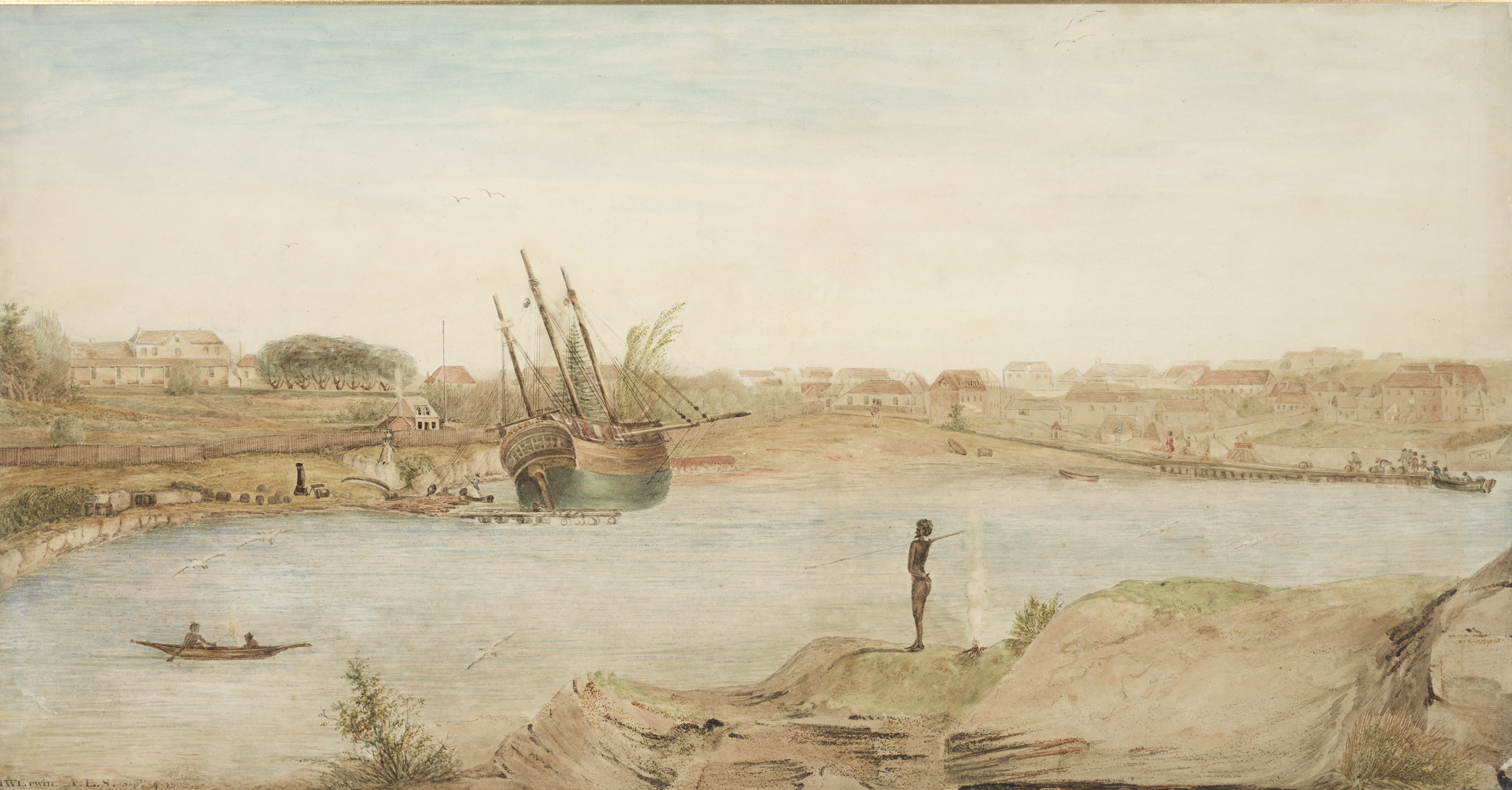
Sydney Cove and Old Government House, Port Jackson, 1808

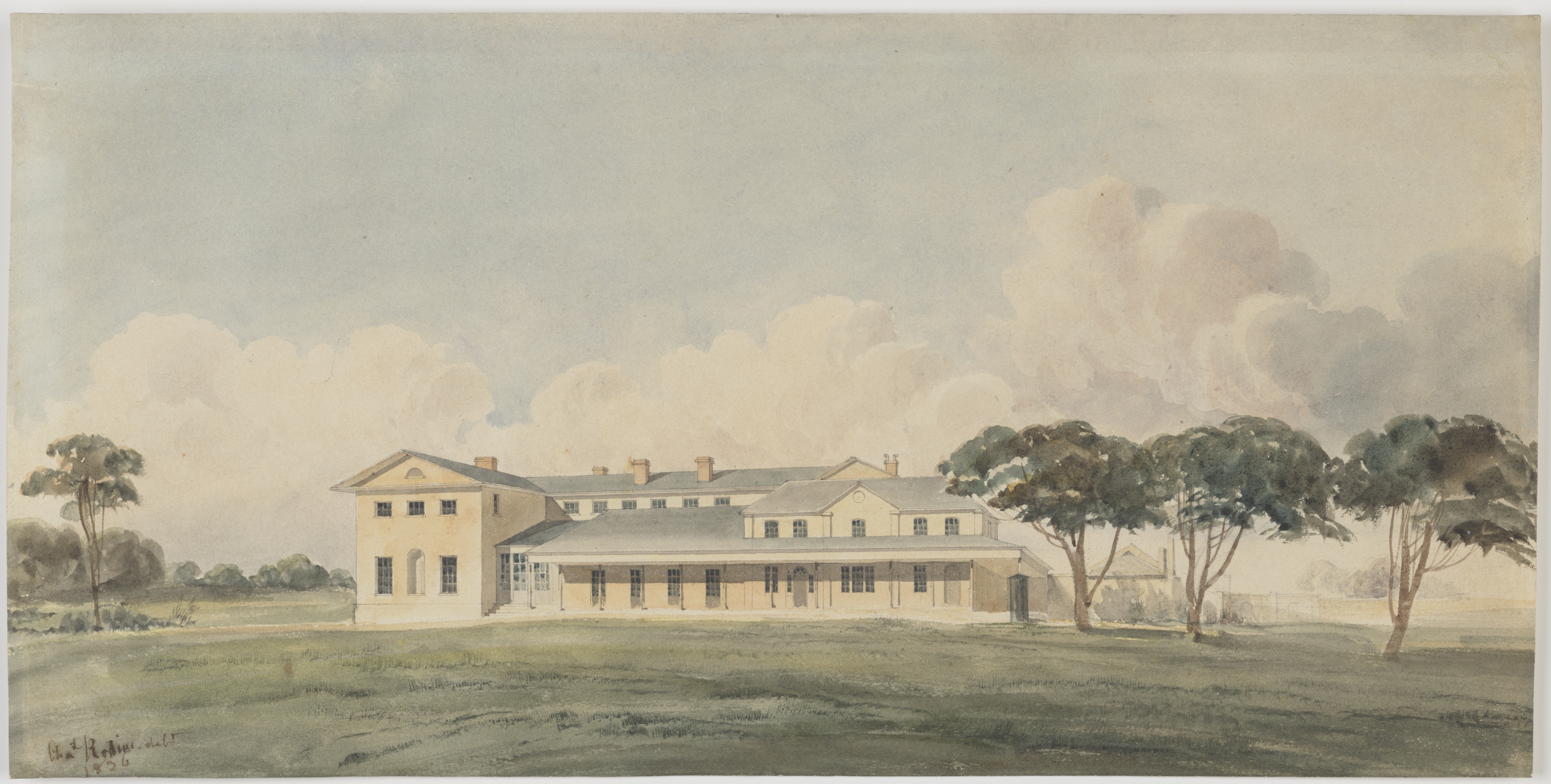
Government House, Sydney, 1836, Charles Rodius

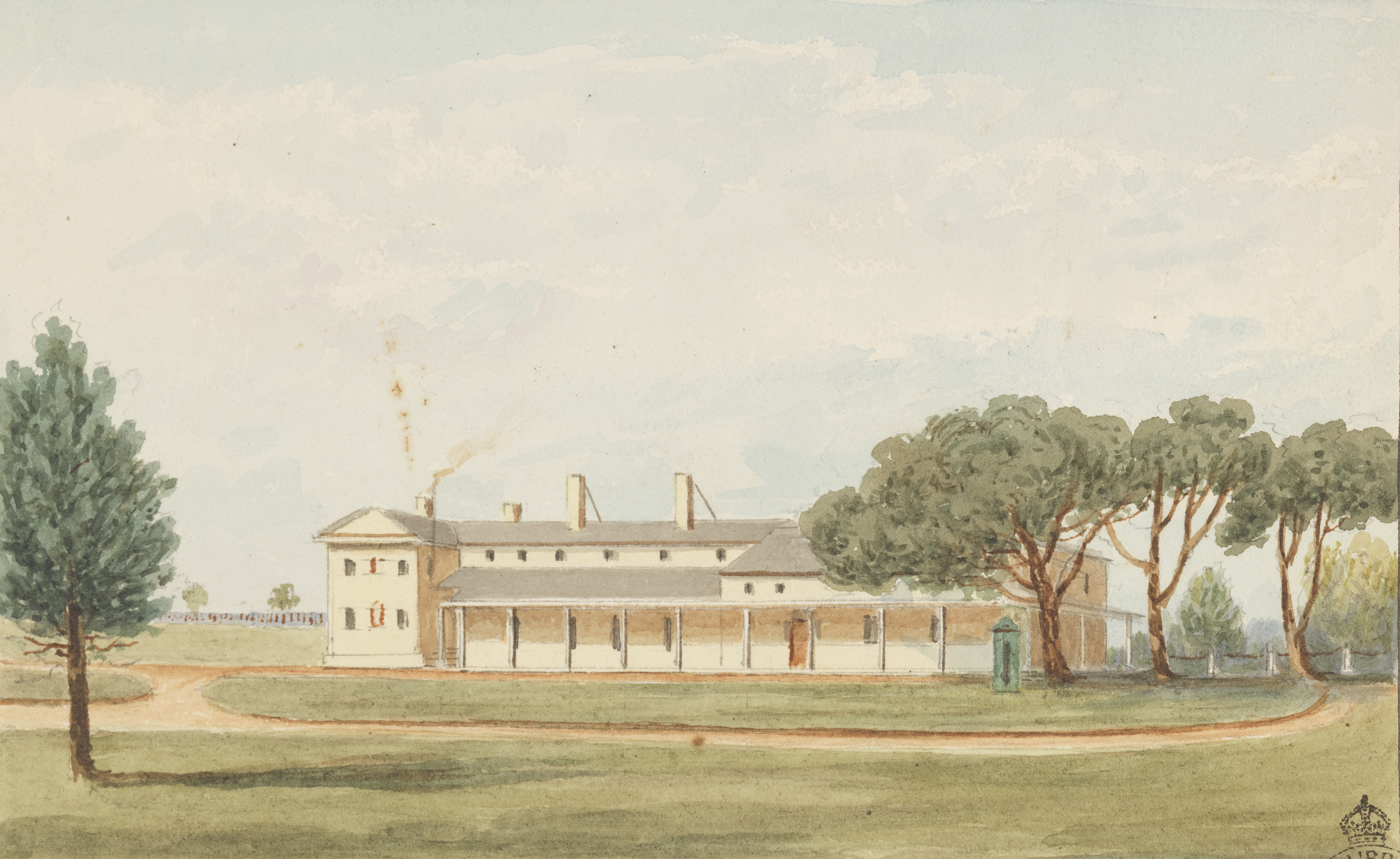
Old Government House in the 1840s

The abode of the first Governor of New South Wales, Captain Arthur Phillip, was a structure made of canvas and timber brought from England with the First Fleet and erected in January 1788. First Government House took about a year to build. Governor Phillip laid the foundation stone in May 1788. He moved into the house on 17 April 1789. As the first permanent building in the colony, it had two storeys built of bricks and stone comprising six rooms, two cellars and a rear staircase. In front of the house was a garden where many imported plant species were grown and the first orchard planted. After establishing the site of the settlement, a substantial "temporary" government house in the Australian Georgian style was established on the corner of Bridge and Phillip streets in the Sydney central business district. The two-storey house was built under the direction of James Bloodsworth, a convict builder responsible for the construction of most of the colony's buildings between 1788 and 1800. This building, the first "permanent" building in Sydney, was completed by 1789 using English bricks, native stone and a quantity of convict-baked sandstock bricks from the Sydney region.

At the back of the house were clusters of outbuildings containing the kitchen, bakehouse, stables and offices and workrooms. In 1794, Lieutenant Governor Grose added a verandah to the house, which was later extended in 1802 by Governor King . In 1795, Governor Hunter set up the colony's first printing office in the grounds which produced Notices and Orders, and in 1803, Australia's first newspaper, the Sydney Gazette.

This first government house was extended and repaired by the following eight Governors. The building was adapted quickly to the Australian climate. The verandah was extended by Governor King in 1802, along the side of the drawing room added in a side wing in the same year. By 1816 Francis Greenway was commissioned to construct a substantial extension and ballroom by Governor Macquarie, transforming Phillip's house into an Italianate cottage; the first such Italianate structure in the colony. Greenway designed a new wing of five rooms on the southern side and a new stable block. The stable block is now the Sydney Conservatorium of Music. Macquarie was responsible for prompting the construction of many of the colony's first permanent public buildings, and he attempted to build a replacement for the original Sydney Government House. Work on this was started by Greenway, but the project was not approved by the British government, and unlike the castle-like stables, commissioned in 1816, was never finished.

The heritage-listed 1816 stables build by Greenway under Macquarie's direction still stand in the Botanic Gardens and form a facade for the Sydney Conservatorium of Music. The stables were built in the Gothic Picturesque architectural style with turrets, the building was described as a "palace for horses", and is a portrayal of the romantic vision of Macquarie and the British architectural trends of the time. It is the only example of a gothic building designed by Greenway still standing. The cost and apparent extravagance was one of the reasons Macquarie was recalled to Britain. The stables, located close to picturesque Sydney Harbour, reflect the building techniques and the range of materials and skills employed during the early settlement era.

The first Government house was generally in poor condition and was vacated when the Governor relocated to the new Government House in 1845, and was demolished in 1846. The house suffered as a result of the poor mortar (made from the lime of crushed sea shells), white ant infestations, and what appeared to be rising damp in later years. Despite these problems, the house was an architectural milestone for Australia, and the first proportionately classical building in the continent. It even included Australia's first staircase. The colony's first Legislative Council met at the house in 1824.

In 1851 the site was granted to the Municipal Council of Sydney for a proposed town hall. However, it was not considered sufficiently centrally located for this purpose. The site remained unfenced and covered in grass until 1867, when it was reported as being used for Council Stores. In the 1880s and 1890s terraces were constructed around the site. Throughout the 1880s the Phillip Street side of the block was bounded by high wooden hoarding. The site was entered off Bridge Street and there were at least two small sheds, one of which was used as a tailor's shop. In 1899 workmen digging at the site found the foundation stone laid by Phillip in 1788. Much of the "Governor's Domain" to the east of the original house has survived today as the adjacent areas of parkland known as The Domain, the Botanic Garden, and also the gardens of today's Government House, adjacent to the Sydney Opera House.

In 1912 a corrugated iron, two storey building was erected on the site for the office of the Government Architect. After its demolition in 1967 the site was paved over for use as a carpark.

=== Site preservation ===
Until 1983 it was generally thought that nothing remained of First Government House and the buildings associated with it. Excavation was undertaken as a prerequisite of a building development. In February 1983 the archaeologists uncovered foundations dating back to 1788. Between June and December 1983 a second stage of excavation was carried out. In the meantime increased public and political interest was evident. The base of the back wall, part of the western wall of Phillip's house and the foundations of the original outbuildings containing the kitchen and the bakehouse were all uncovered. Stone foundations, garden paths, drains, evidence of the first printing office and thousands of other objects were also discovered.

The site of the first government house remained virtually untouched until the 1980s, when a proposal to build a new high rise office tower on the site was made. Following representations to the NSW Government by concerned members of the newly formed Friends of the First Government House Site, construction was deferred to allow archaeologists to explore the area. The well-preserved foundations of First Government House were located in 1983 and excavated over the following months; providing a priceless insight into the early years of the nation. The tower was redesigned to preserve the historic foundations and incorporate them into the design of a new museum. When it was commissioned, the project was called the First Government House Museum. Whilst the museum building was being built in November 1993, the New South Wales Minister for the Arts announced that the museum would be known as the Museum of Sydney on the Site of First Government House, described in the press at the time as a "mouthful" and commonly contracted to Museum of Sydney. The change of name attracted protests.

The site was placed on the (now defunct) Register of the National Estate by special gazettal and public meetings were held to raise support for the site. The progress of the excavations was followed in the media. As a result of the importance of these finds the NSW Government, owner of the site, released the commercial developers from their development lease to keep the site for future generations. A national design competition was announced for a development design to ensure the conservation and protection of the site.

In 1984 a third stage of excavation was carried out. Between December 1984 and January 1985 the site was sealed with bitumen to protect the remains. Further analysis of the stratigraphy and artefacts from the site was carried out. In June 1988 an architectural competition was announced for the design of a structure to commemorate first government house, and adjoining commercial office development.

It is now the site of the Museum of Sydney.

== Description ==
The site is situated on the south-west corner of the intersection of Bridge and Phillip Streets in the northern section of the Sydney CBD. It includes an area that is currently occupied by Victorian terraces on the north-west portion of the site.

Remains uncovered on the site include the foundation of the back wall and part of the western wall of Phillip's house, and the foundations of the original outbuildings containing the bakehouse and kitchen. Other stone foundations, drains, and a corner of the Dining Room Governor Macquarie added to the house are also extant. (Department of Planning)

These are incorporated into the interior floor of the Museum of Sydney and the forecourt.

=== Condition ===
As at 11 October 1999, the archaeological potential of the site is medium to high. Other foundations may be extant under Bridge Street.

=== Modifications and dates ===
- 1794 - Verandah added by Lieutenant Governor Grose
- c. 1795 - First printing office set up.
- 1802 - Governor King adds Drawing Room and extends verandah
- 1810-21 - New wing of five rooms including a salon on the southern side and a new stable block added.
- 1825-27 Alterations by Henry Dumaresq for Governor Darling
- 1845-46 - House and outbuildings demolished
- Post 1846 - Site used for a variety of purposes, including offices, stores and a carpark.
- 1993 - Construction of Museum of Sydney on part of the site of First Government House.

== Heritage listing ==
As at 3 March 2000, First Government House was the first permanent centre of colonial administration in Australia. It was the home and offices of the Governors of New South Wales from 1788 to 1845 and the official, social and administrative centre of the colony from 1788 to 1845. As such, it is associated with numerous events of political, cultural and social significance to the colony's development. Its use as both home and seat of authority and its siting and subsequent development determined to a large extent the pattern of growth of Sydney. This entails both the physical pattern of the streets and its cultural pattern of political, official, recreational and residential and mercantile quarters.

The site of the building contains the only remains from 1788 known to survive in 1983. These remains provide evidence of Australia's major phases of history, architectural, building technology, and administration of the colony in New South Wales.

First Government House has a unique historical significance because of the many historic figures, both European and Aboriginal, who are associated with the building. It also has great scientific significance which is proven in its potential to answer research questions in these and other fields.

First Government House is of great symbolic importance to the Australian people. The site is our most tangible link to our past and the foundation of white settlement in this country.

First Government House, Sydney was listed on the New South Wales State Heritage Register on 10 December 1999 having satisfied the following criteria.

The place is important in demonstrating the course, or pattern, of cultural or natural history in New South Wales.

The site is a symbol of the foundation and perpetuation of European settlement and authority in Australia. First Government House was a major link with the U.K. as it was the first permanent centre of British colonial administration in Australia. It is associated with a major phase in Australia's government, being the centre of power throughout its life. The first portion of the building to be erected was constructed by the first settlers of the colony. The in situ works and structures demonstrate the high standard of the first building in the colony and the echoing European style. An example of the technology and high standards of the building are demonstrated in the footing and drainage system. The remains show evidence of difficulties in the building materials used and how the problems were resolved. First Government House was an example of modern living and displayed in later buildings. The extensions and alterations show the enhanced importance of the governor and his colony. Its replacement was an indication that it could no longer reflect this status adequately. It has associations with important people, such as explorers, governors, foreign visitors, Aboriginals, merchants, statesmen and settlers. It is also associated with government decisions and historic events for the first 57 years of the colony's existence. It was the office and residence of the first and eight succeeding Governors of NSW. It is associated with the earliest formal attempts to communicate with the Aboriginal people of Australia. It was the location for historic events such as the arrest of Governor Bligh at the beginning of the Rum Rebellion, the beginning of the press in Australia and the first meetings of the Legislative Council. As one of the first stone and brick buildings erected in the colony, it is significant as a prime example of experimentation with, and development of, building style and technology. The location of First Government House influenced the development of the irregular street pattern at the south-eastern side of Sydney Cove. The ground around the house was one of the first areas in the colony to be cleared. The changing use of this land is a prime example of experimentation with the development of landscape design. It is also associated with the history of art. It was a major landmark and was the centre of many paintings and drawings of Sydney before 1845.

The place is important in demonstrating aesthetic characteristics and/or a high degree of creative or technical achievement in New South Wales.

The First Government House Precinct is significant due to the variety of styles, and the consistent scale, texture and unique quality of many of its component buildings. Both variation in terms of space and scale are contributed by the site within the townscape of Bridge and Phillip Streets. The site provides a balance between the dominant verticality of buildings in the city.

The place has a strong or special association with a particular community or cultural group in New South Wales for social, cultural or spiritual reasons.

It is a crucial landmark for all Australians, including in particular groups of people who are of English, Irish and Scots descent, Aboriginal people and First Fleeters. The site is significant to Aboriginal people because of its association with historic Aboriginal persons and also as the focal point in their country's invasion by white people. As it contains the oldest in-situ remains of British settlement in Australia, and as the site of the earliest seat of government in the colony, the site is saturated with direct historical associations and, for many, has become the symbolic focus of diverse environmental, cultural, racial and political issues related to the colonisation of Australia.

The place has potential to yield information that will contribute to an understanding of the cultural or natural history of New South Wales.

First Government House is of Archaeological significance because it contains the answers to many historical and scientific questions which can only be solved by archaeological techniques. The First Government House site gives archaeologists and historians opportunities for research into aspects of the city of Sydney 200 years ago. The site has research value as an area of primary information from the earliest days of colonisation to the present day. It has educational value as a resource explaining the history of an area and the techniques for researching that history. The primary site and precinct with their associated structures and grounds are significant because they constitute an archive of the development of architectural history, building technology and changing land uses in urban development over a 200-year period.

The place possesses uncommon, rare or endangered aspects of the cultural or natural history of New South Wales.

The site contains in situ remains of Australia's first permanent Government House. These remains are the only known in situ physical evidence from the first year of European settlement and are our most tangible link with it. It is the only site yet located with archaeological deposits covering the full 211 years of Australia's European Colonisation.

The place is important in demonstrating the principal characteristics of a class of cultural or natural places/environments in New South Wales.

Being the first permanent residence, it became an exemplar for building fashion: stone footings, white washed brick walls and terra-cotta or shingle roofs became the accepted residential standard of the free class.

== Gallery ==
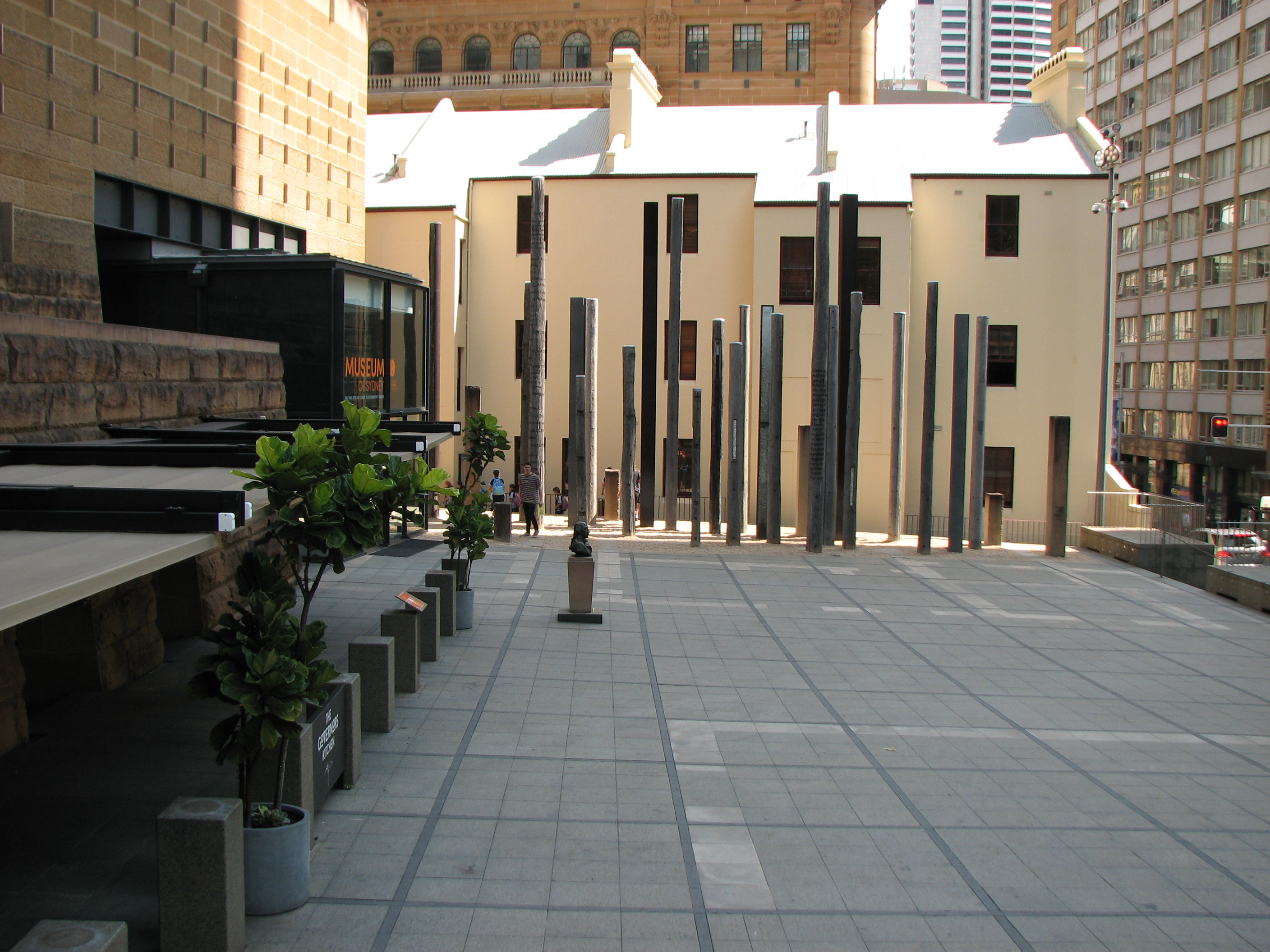
First Government House Sydney - Forecourt

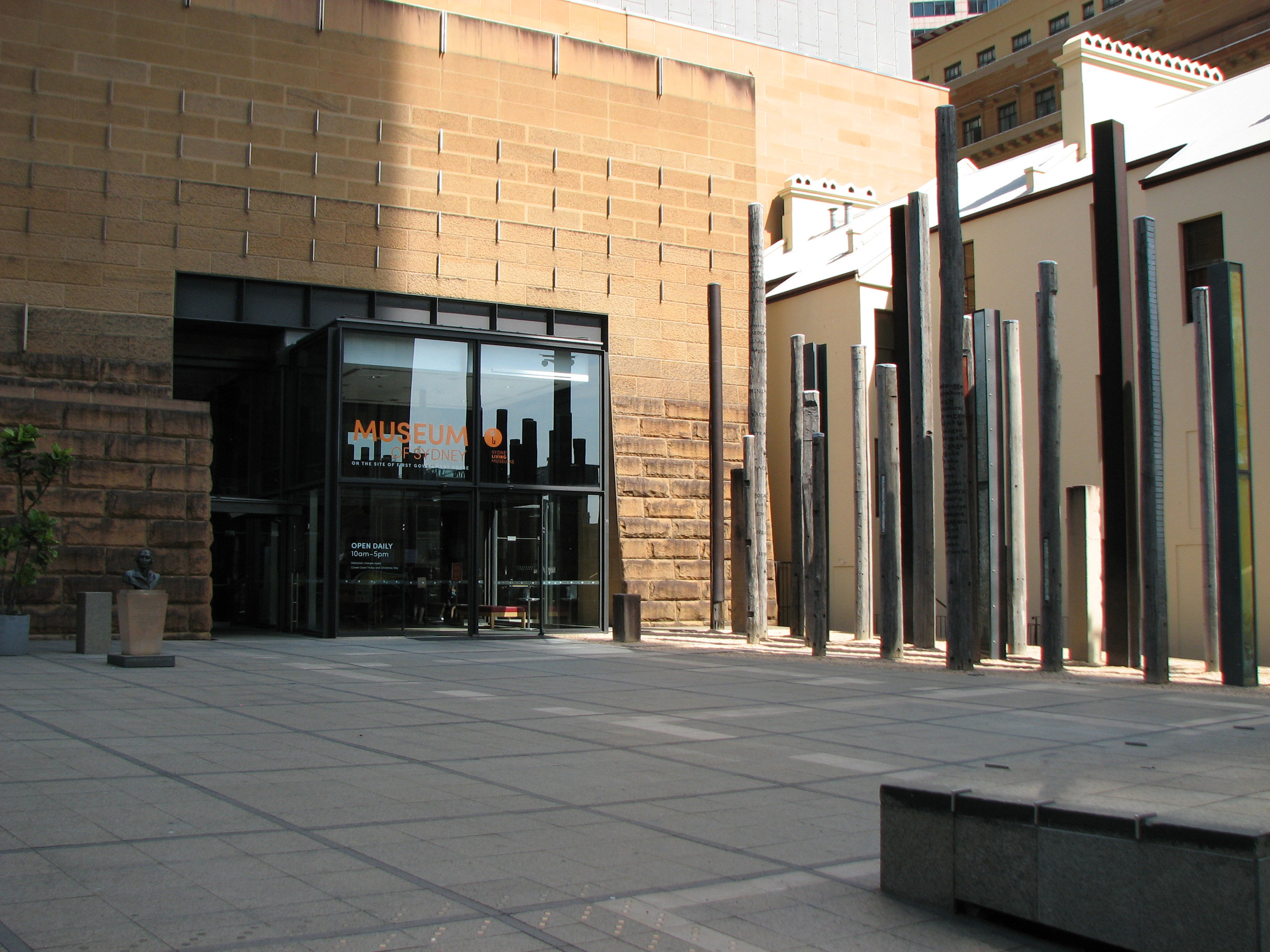
First Government House Sydney - Museum Entrance

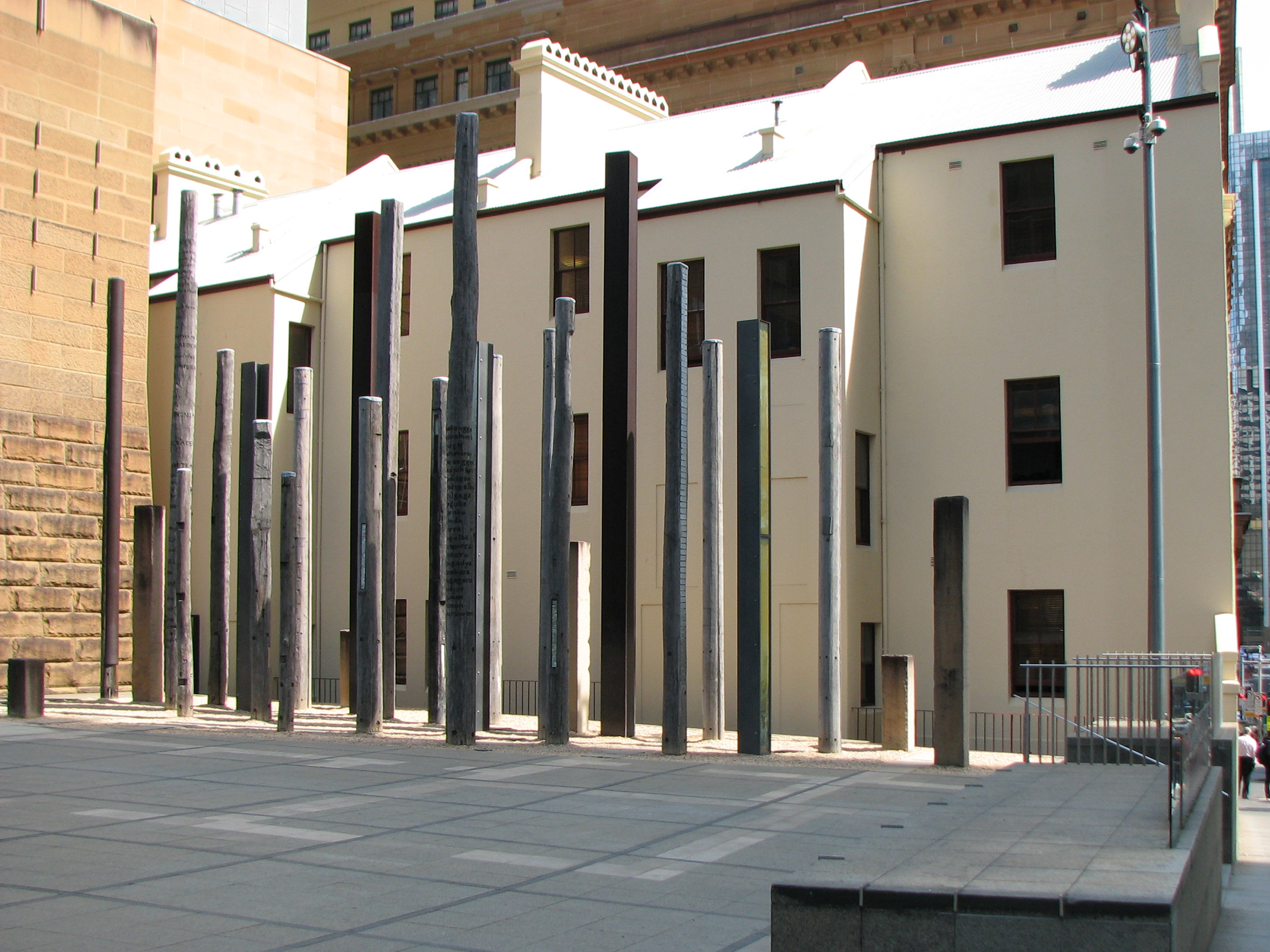
First Government House Sydney - Sculpture

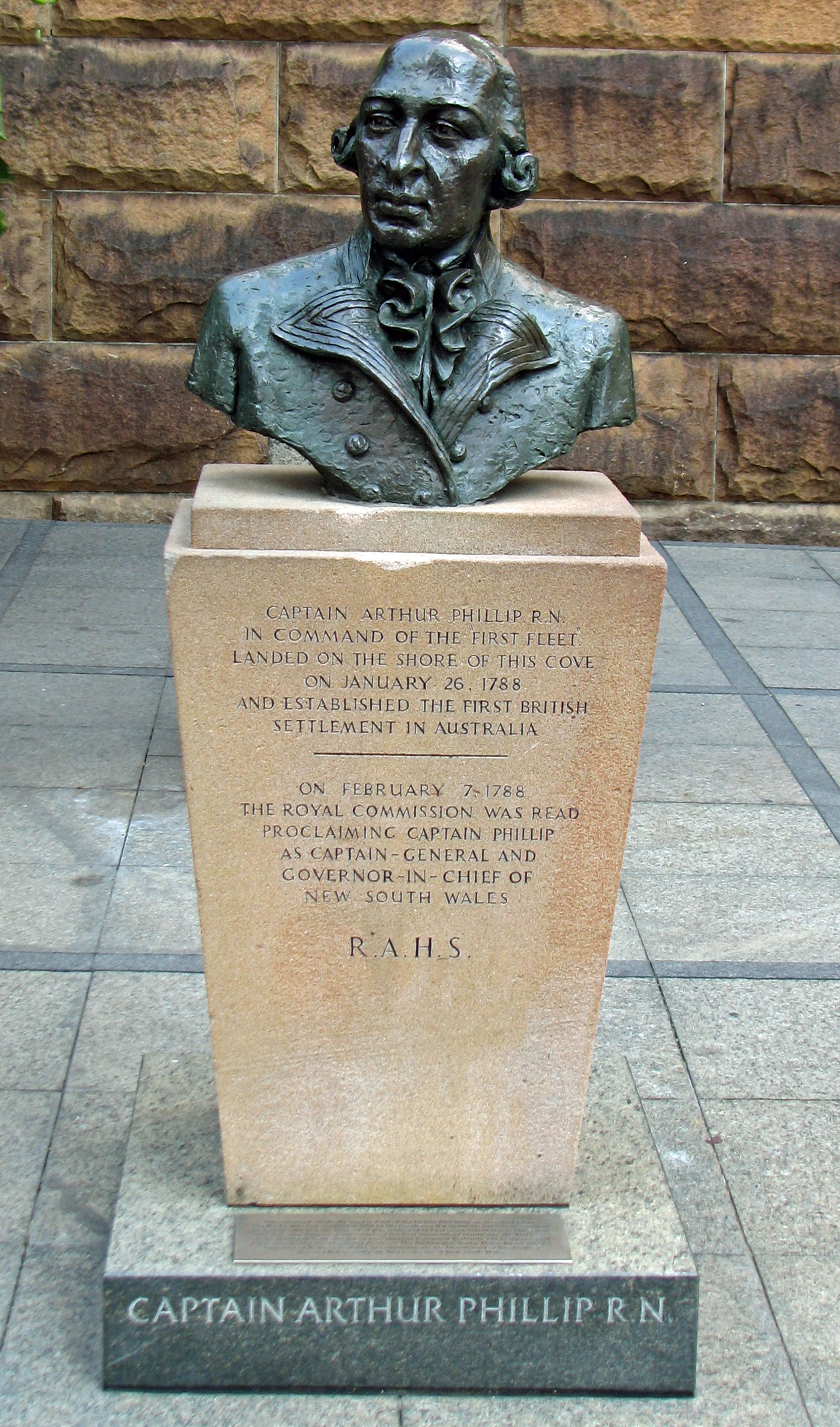
First Government House Sydney - Arthur Phillip

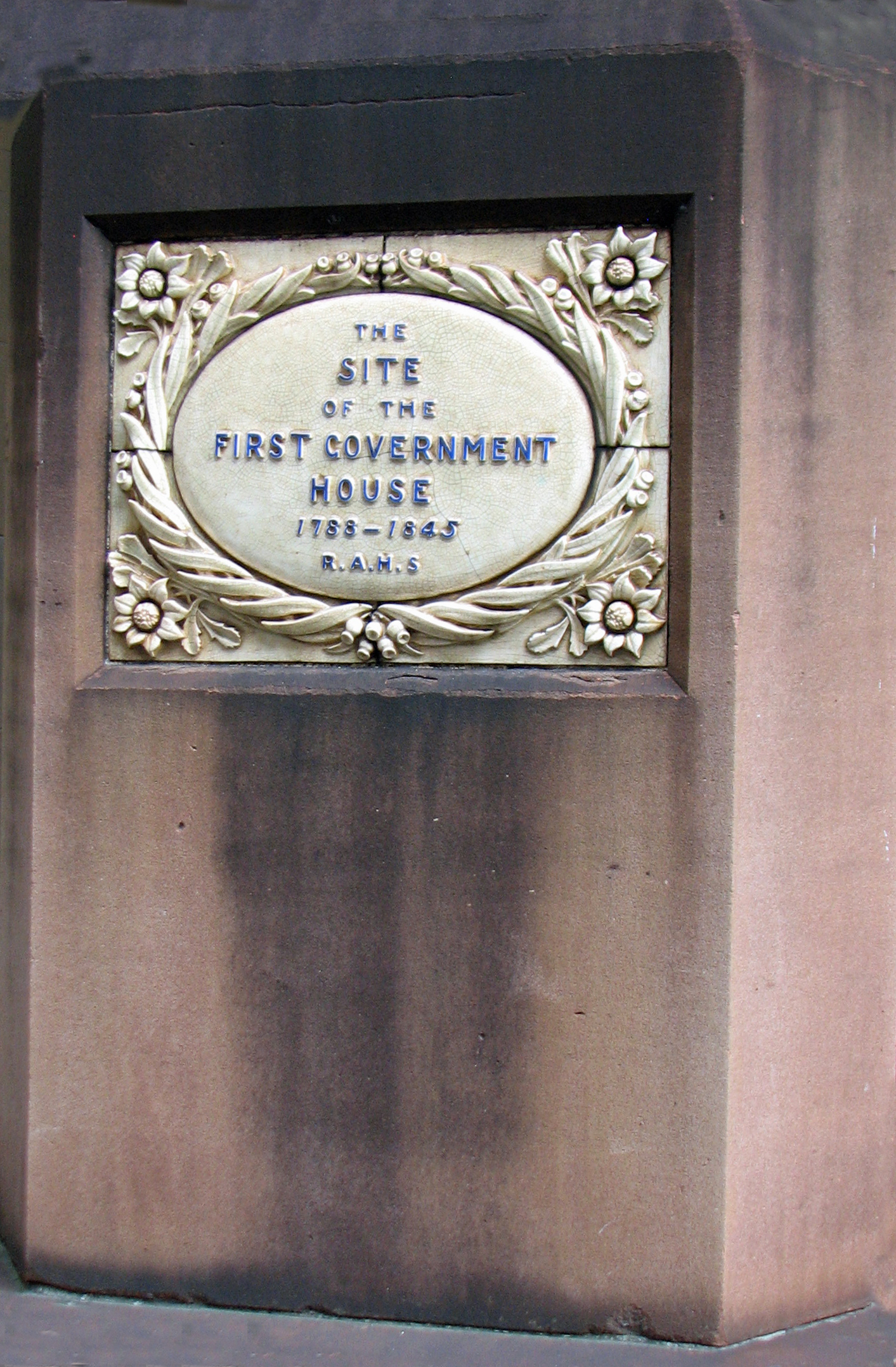
First Government House Sydney - Plaque

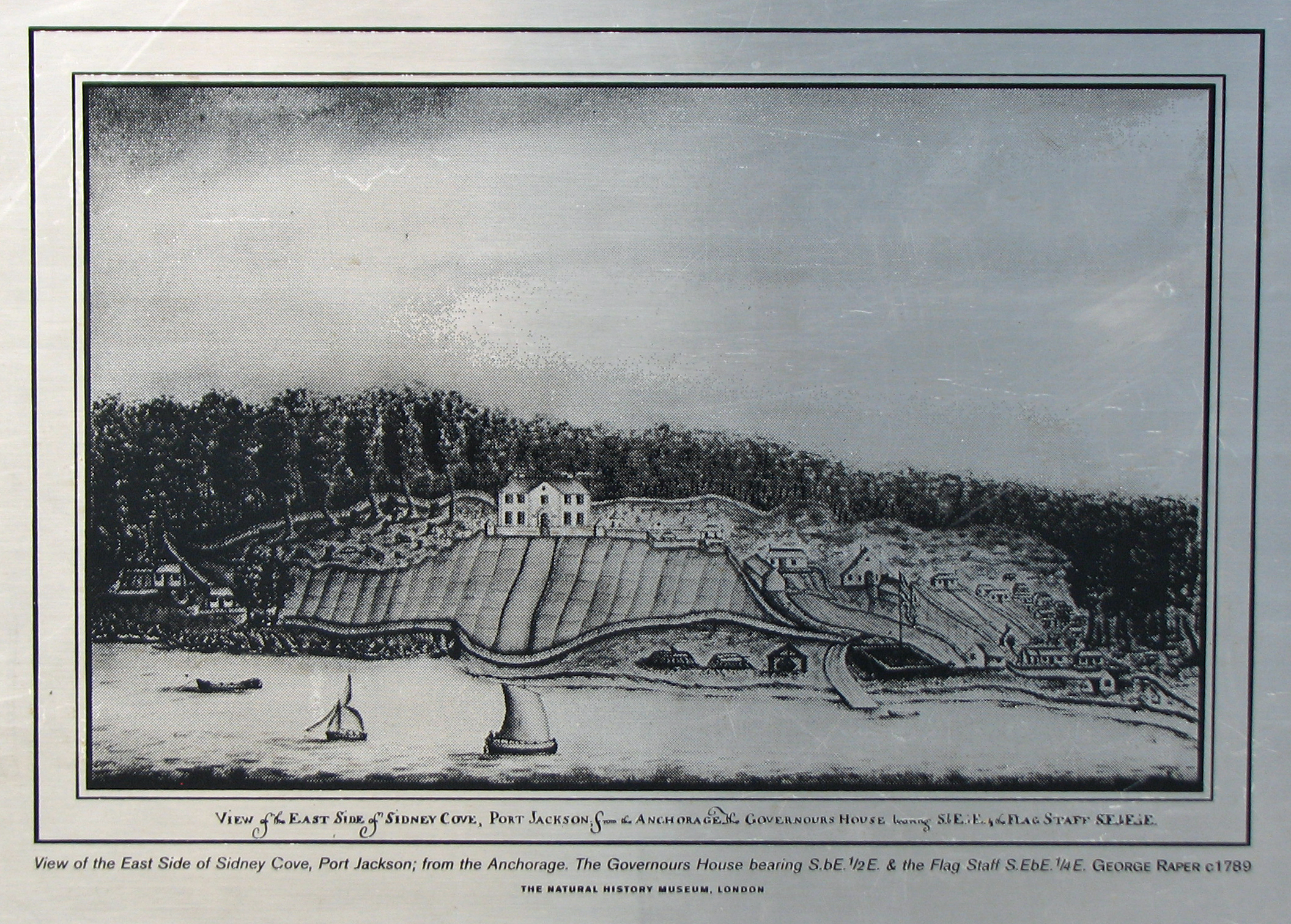
First Government House Sydney - Early Engraving

== See also ==
- Museum of Sydney
- Old Government House, Parramatta, the country retreat for the early Governors of New South Wales
- Government House, Sydney, the present residence of the Governor of New South Wales
- Cranbrook, Bellevue Hill, the residence of the Governor of New South Wales from 1900 to 1914
- Government Houses of Australia
