= Sarah Bellamy =

- Born: 1770; Worcestershire, England
- Died: 24 February 1843 (aged 72–73)
- Occupations: Weaver and maid
- Spouse(s): James Bloodsworth, Joseph Downey
- Children: 8
- Parent(s): Richard Bellamy, Elizabeth Staunton

Sarah Bellamy (1770 – 24 February 1843) was a convict on the First Fleet to Australia. She was sentenced for several years' transportation and was one of the longest-living first fleeters.

== Early life ==
Bellamy was born in 1770 to Richard and Elizabeth Bellamy and before she was convicted, she was unemployed.

== Crime and sentencing ==
She was convicted on the 9 July 1785 for robbing a purse full of cash and prommissary notes containing 630 shillings. Bellamy was sentenced to seven years transportation. Two days before she left for Botany Bay she pleaded to be publicly whipped and not to be transported but her pleas were ignored and she left England at age 17 in May 1787.

== Journey to Australia ==
She travelled to Australia aboard the Lady Penrhyn. Bellamy had to share the ship with one hundred and one other women; no male convicts were on the ship. Aboard the ship she had a short-lived relationship with one of the sailors, Joseph Downey; they had a baby aboard the ship but he died 9 days later. Their relationship did not continue when they reached their destination. It took 252 days to reach Botany Bay.

== Convict years ==
She first worked as a housemaid to Lieutenant Faddy and, later, a weaver. She later married James Bloodsworth, and together they had seven children of which four died at infancy. Due to James being a bricklayer and architect they lived together in a beautiful house, had a high social status and were quite wealthy due to James's salary being 50 pounds. Bellamy's family gained a very good reputation throughout the new colony. She outlived her husband, who died on 24 March 1804 from pneumonia, leaving her with three young children—the oldest being 13 years old. She lived with her children but didn't marry again and later was granted a conditional pardon on 23 February 1811. In fact, James and Sarah never married, because it was known that James had left a living wife (Jane Marks; married 9 December 1782) and several children in England when he was transported.

== Death ==
She died on 24 February 1843. The reason of her death is unspecified but is thought to be of natural causes. She was buried two days after her death at Meekcity Street Cemetery. She was joined by four of her children, James Bloodsworth (died 16 April 1857), John Bloodsworth (died 14 April 1873) Ann Bloodsworth (Bray) (died 16 April 1875) and Elizabeth Bloodsworth (died 1871).
