= Old Government House, Parramatta =

Old Government House
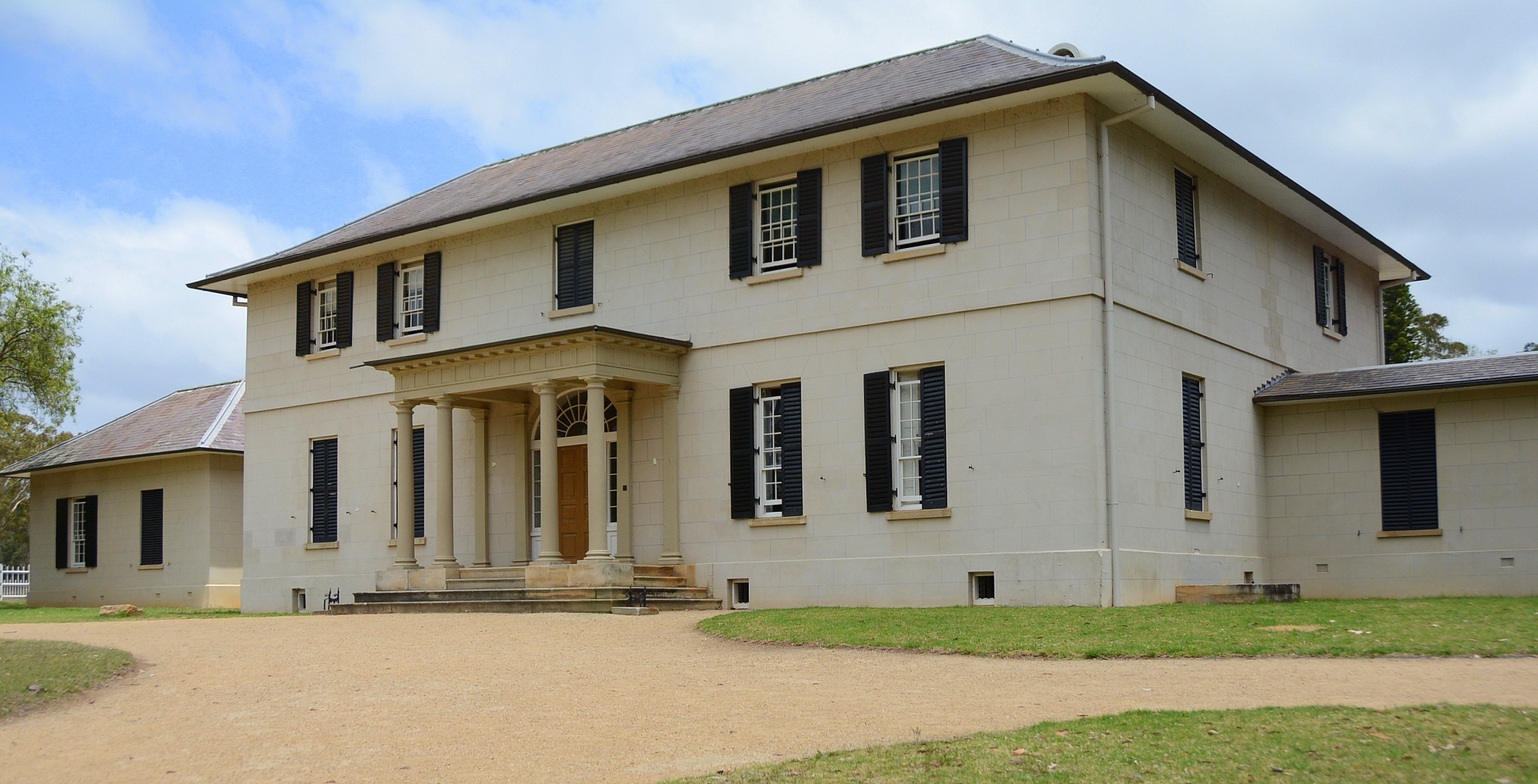
- Old Government House

- Location within Sydney

General information
- Type: Mansion
- Architectural style: Old Colonial Georgian
- Location: Parramatta Park, Parramatta, Greater Sydney, New South Wales, Australia
- Coordinates: 33°48′44″S 150°59′50″E
- Construction started: 1799
- Completed: 1820
- Client: John Hunter; Lachlan Macquarie; (as Governors of New South Wales)
- Owner: National Trust of Australia (NSW) - Trustee

Technical details
- Grounds: 45 hectares (110 acres)

Design and construction
- Architects: John Cliffe Watts; Francis Greenway; Walter Liberty Vernon
- Architecture firm: Colonial Architect of New South Wales

UNESCO World Heritage Site
- Type: Cultural
- Criteria: iv, vi
- Designated: 2010 (34th session)
- Part of: Australian Convict Sites
- Reference no.: 1306
- Region: Asia-Pacific

Australian National Heritage List
- Type: Historic
- Designated: 1 August 2007
- Reference no.: 105957

New South Wales Heritage Register
- Type: Historical
- Designated: 2 April 1999
- Reference no.: 00596

Old Government House is a heritage-listed former country residence used by ten early Governors of the Colony of New South Wales, between 1800 and 1847, and which is located in Parramatta Park in Parramatta, in the suburbs of Western Sydney, New South Wales, Australia. It is considered a site of national and international significance as an archaeological and historical resource. It also serves to demonstrate how the 18th-century British Empire conducted its expansion, and how Australian society has evolved since its establishment in 1788.

The poor quality of the original Sydney Government House, as well as crime and unsanitary conditions in the growing Sydney penal settlement convinced successive Governors of the desirability of a rural residence. In 1799 the second Governor, John Hunter, had the remains of Arthur Phillip's cottage cleared away, and a more permanent building erected on the same site.

Old Government House is furnished in the style of the early 1820s and is open to visitors. It is situated at Parramatta on 110 hectares (260 acres) of parkland overlooking the Parramatta River, and is Australia's oldest public building. The grounds are of particular interest as they are a relatively undisturbed colonial-era reserve surrounded by what is now Australia's largest urban area. The practice of "firestick" land management by the Burramatta tribe of the aboriginal Darug people, who once dwelt in the area, is evident from certain scars that can be seen on trees still standing (their bark being removed to build canoes). Also, shells used to strengthen the mortar used in the House's construction have been found to originate from Aboriginal middens.

In July 2010 Old Government House and Domain was inscribed on the World Heritage List as one of 11 Australian sites with a significant association with convict transportation (i.e. the Australian Convict Sites) which together represent "the best surviving examples of large-scale convict transportation and the colonial expansion of European powers through the presence and labour of convicts"

== Description ==
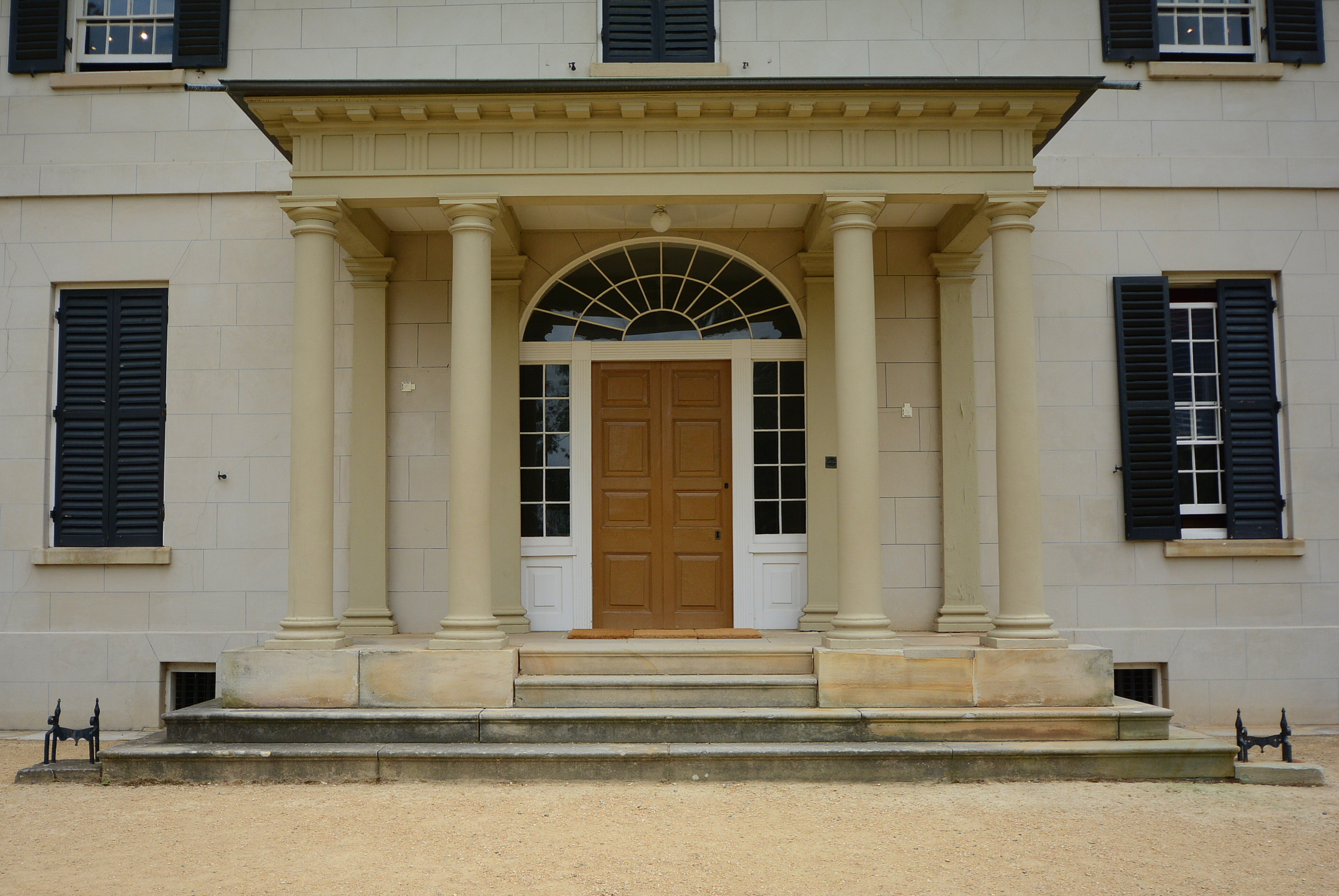
The front portico

The original area of the Governor's Domain has been reduced from 99.6 to 85 hectares (246 to 210 acres), and the area to the north and east of the river is now largely devoted to sporting facilities. The area contains over eighty items of cultural significance. These items include: buildings (such as Old Government House), relics (former observatory), historic plantings, archaeological sites (41 in all, including former roads, convict huts, stables, redoubt, lumberyard), vistas (across Parramatta and along George St to the former wharf) and natural items such as bushland. Evidence of Aboriginal use of this area includes stone artefacts and scarred trees (Rosen, S. 2003).

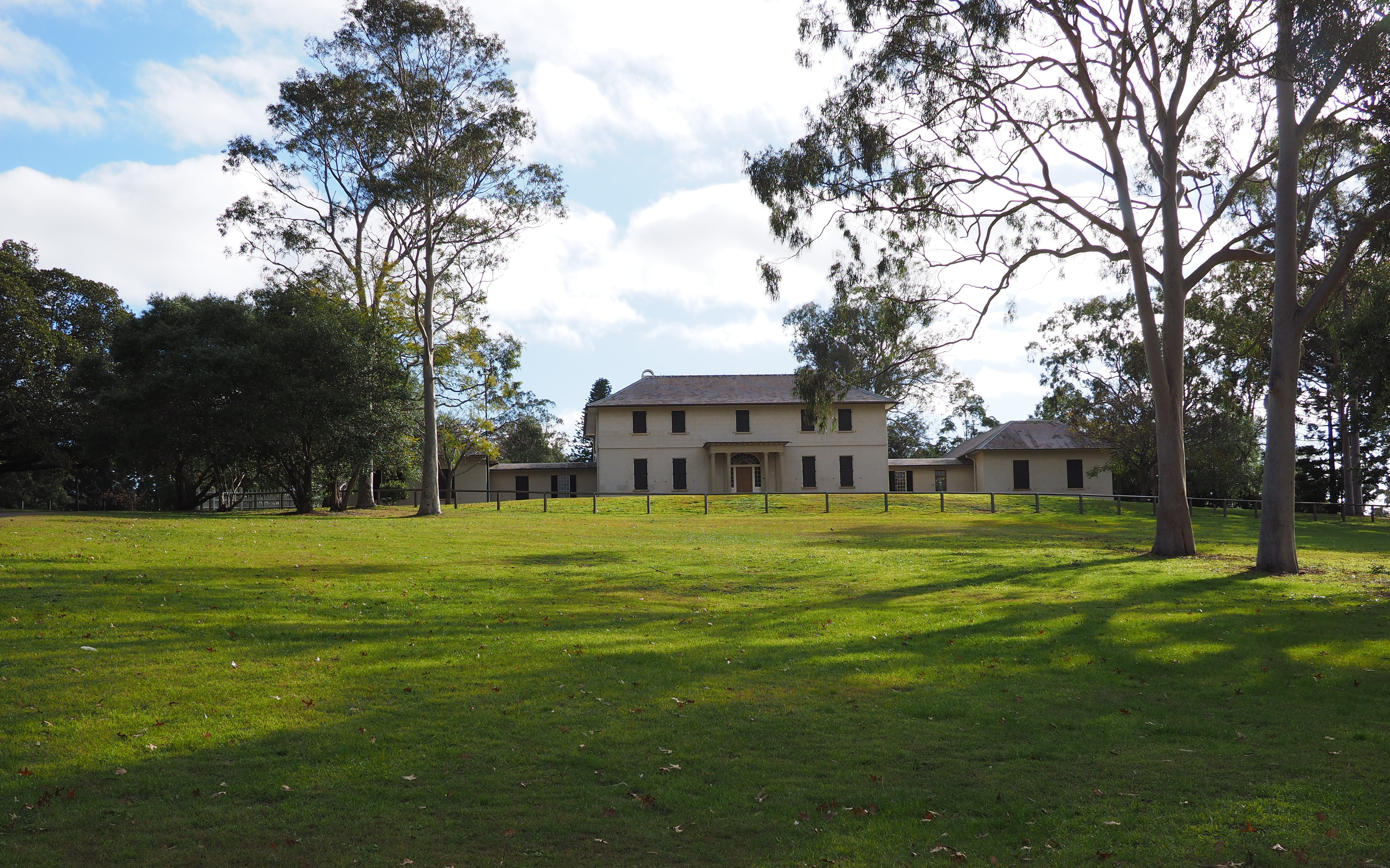
The residence as viewed from Parramatta Park

Within the boundary of the place, the layout of the major elements of the park retains much of the Governor Macquarie usage of the space. Existing roads for the most part follow the original carriage ways. The generally open Cumberland Plain Woodlands survive in patches in the Park, with much of the open landscape of the broader Governor's Domain, which reflect Elizabeth Macquarie's design principles, still evident in the Park as it exists today. The 'Crescent', the natural amphitheatre which attracted Governor Phillip to the area – influencing the decision to establish the farm there, is evident today and used as an outdoor amphitheatre and performance space.

The astronomical work of Governor Brisbane at the site can still be seen in the remains of the observatory and the marker trees, and represents the commencement of Australian scientific endeavour and the start of a process during which Australia developed a world renowned reputation for scientific research and discovery.

The road ways and their layouts reflect the natural topography of the area including the River Road which follows the course of the Parramatta River and their alignments have remained substantially unchanged since the 1880s. The roads are likely to have beneath them substantial remains of older road surfaces, culverts and retaining walls. The roadways within the Park also have a park-land ambience which separate them from the busy roads surrounding the Park. River Road is a particularly pleasant and evocative tree-lined avenue.

Old Government House at Parramatta was built by convicts and is the oldest surviving public building on the Australian mainland. The original 1799 building was enlarged in 1815 to a design by John Watts to form a two-storey block, two single storey end pavilions and two linked blocks with extended eaves. The central portico is attributed to Francis Greenway (Irving 1985: 55). With its symmetrical proportions, shadow patterns from extended eaves and central portico it exhibits the 'Palladian' characteristics of Australian Old Colonial Georgian architecture. A section of the brick flooring of the Phillip era, of July 1790, survives and is on display. The three rooms at the front of the main section of the house date to Governor Hunter in 1799, while the remainder of the main house and the two side pavilions date to Governor Macquarie in 1818. The entrance hall of Old Government House notably features a black-and-white chequered floor, in keeping with the tastes of the period. However, due to the absence of building materials such as marble or granite in the early Sydney settlement, the floor had to made out of painted wood. The original wooden flooring can be seen to this day.

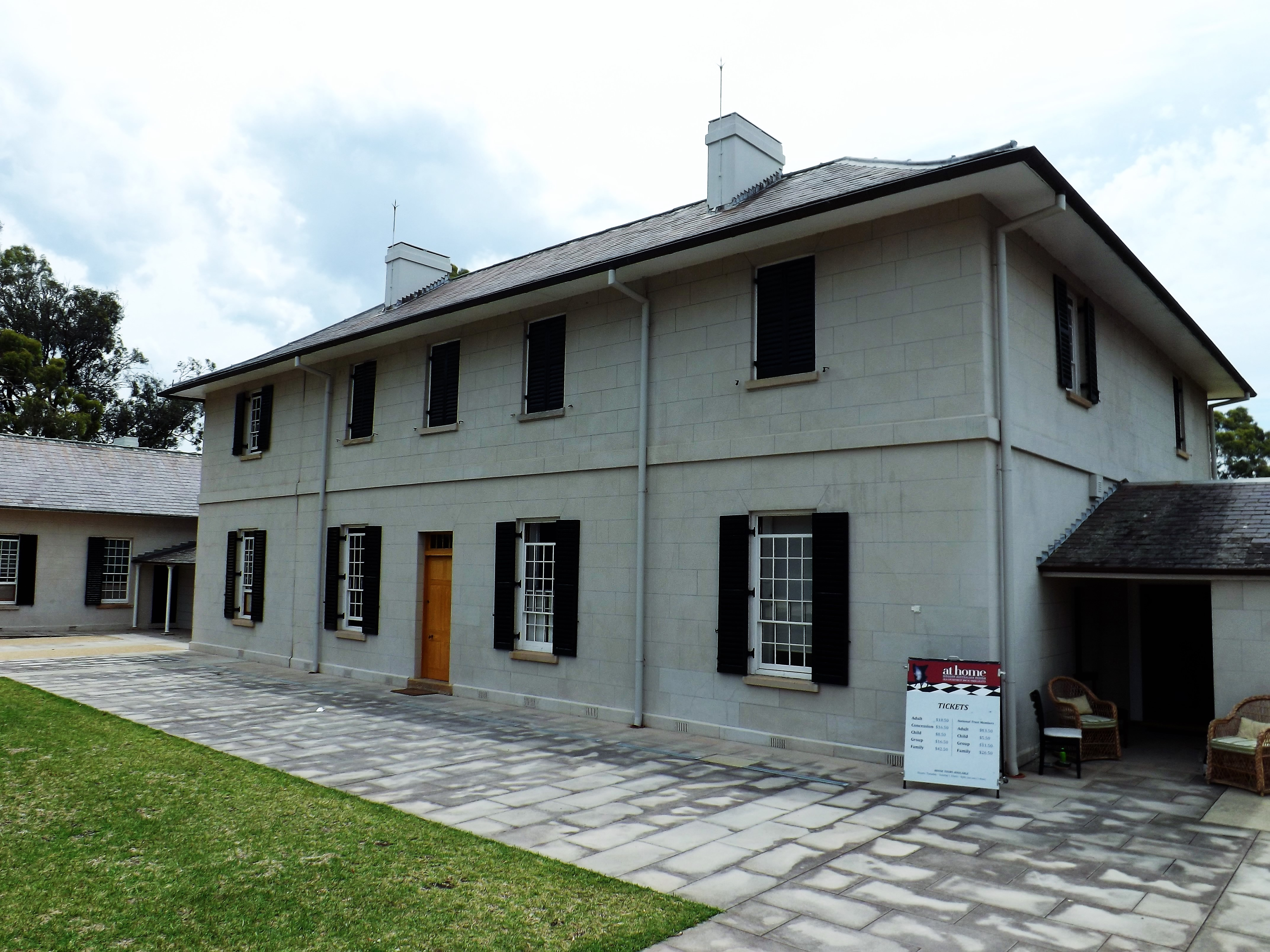
The rear of the house, facing the courtyard

The Governor's dairy survives in its original setting, and has recently been stabilised and restored by the Park Trust. The park landscape and use has continued since 1857. Memorials have been erected reflecting layers of community meaning. Important amongst these is the Boer War Memorial erected in 1904 which continues as a major landmark feature of the place. The Boer War Memorial, the memorial to Lady Mary Fitzroy, and the gatehouses remain in their original sites and are in good condition. Other elements, however, have been subjected to substantial change over the decades. The Macquarie stables and coachhouse were removed when the Great Western Railway line was pushed through the south-western section of the Domain. Little remains of Governor Brisbane's observatory with the exception of the transit stones and the marker trees. Similarly, Governor Brisbane's bathhouse, although still in its original site, has undergone extensive alteration. The original interior has been stripped out, the fabric within the arches removed, and the building turned into an open pavilion.

=== Precincts ===
Old Government House precinct

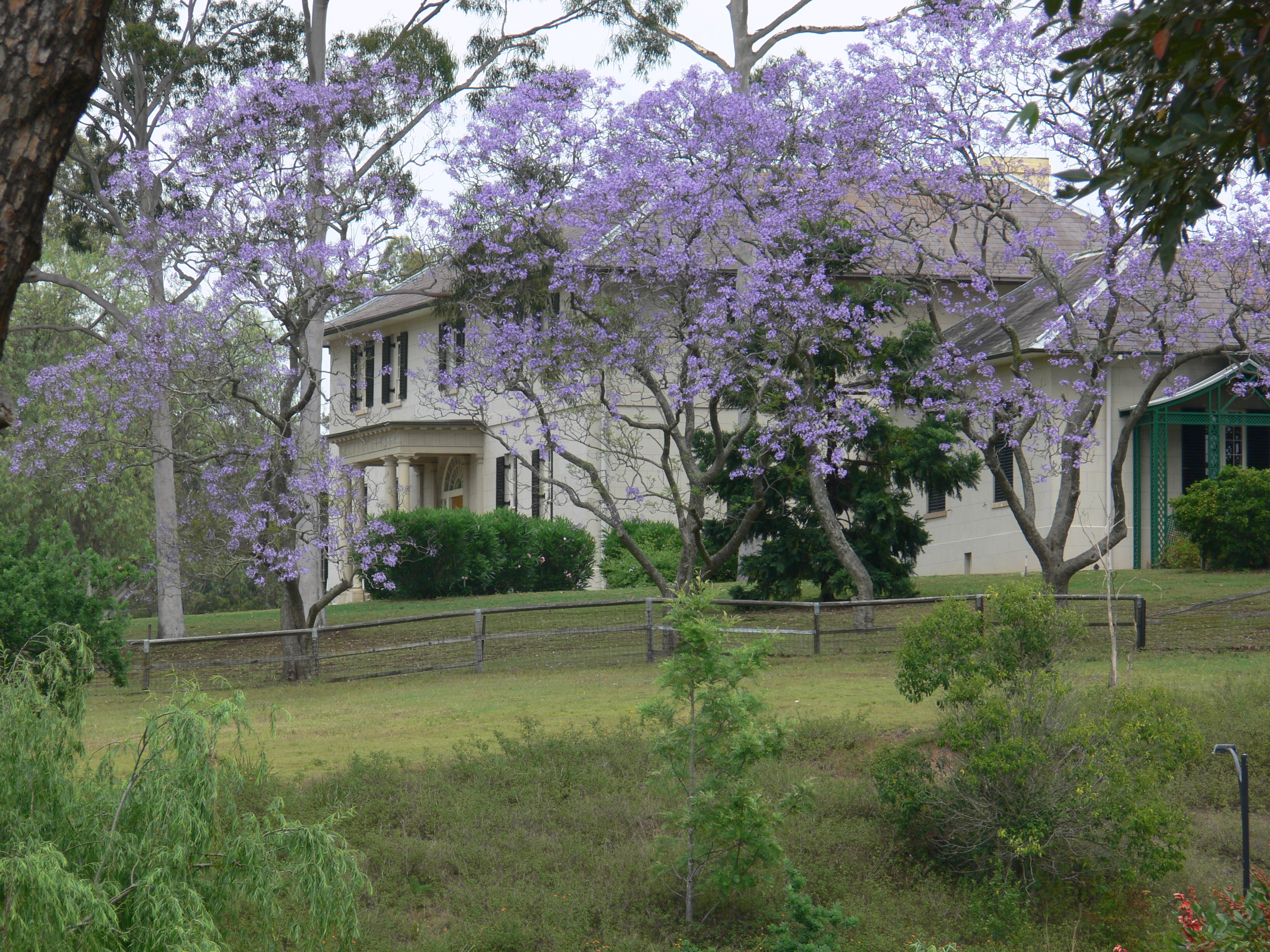
The gardens and grounds during spring

This precinct surrounds the building complex of Old Government House, including its garden to the east and north, rear courtyard to the west, range of outbuildings west of that and further rear yard / courtyard beyond that. Old Government House's garden and grounds are richly planted.

The Crescent Precinct

This comprises "The Crescent", a billabong landform of an old anabranch of the Parramatta River, which, with its rich deposited river silt and loam, has long been a centre of Government cultivation in the colony, helping feed its near-starving early inhabitants. Successful cultivation of cereal crops, grapes (some of Australia's earliest) and other crops here literally fed the colony after 1788 and crop failures and erratic ship arrivals. Later in the twentieth century the Crescent was in-filled and has taken on more of a passive recreation focus, for outdoor concerts and events. The ridgeline along Constitution Hill wrapping west of the Crescent's rim has been revegetated in native trees, shrubs and grasses since the mid-1990s to strengthen the biodiversity values and viability of remnant eucalypt trees here.

The Paddocks Precinct

This comprises the paddocks west of Constitution Hill and the Dairy/Salter's Cottage precinct. This comprises farm paddock elements remaining from the Government Domain, which once extended further west (all of what is today Westmead – being West Meadow) and Northmead (North Meadow). Today these are primarily grassed for passive recreation with playground equipment, picnic and other facilities scattered around.

The Dairy/Salter's Cottage Precinct

This comprises some of the earliest building complexes in the park lands, and remnants of early land grants to private farmers of the Government Domain. It is fenced off from the surroundings and interpreted for its historic uses with a modest garden and small representative orchard, sculpture, interpretation and guided tours.

=== Other buildings and features ===
George Street Gatehouse

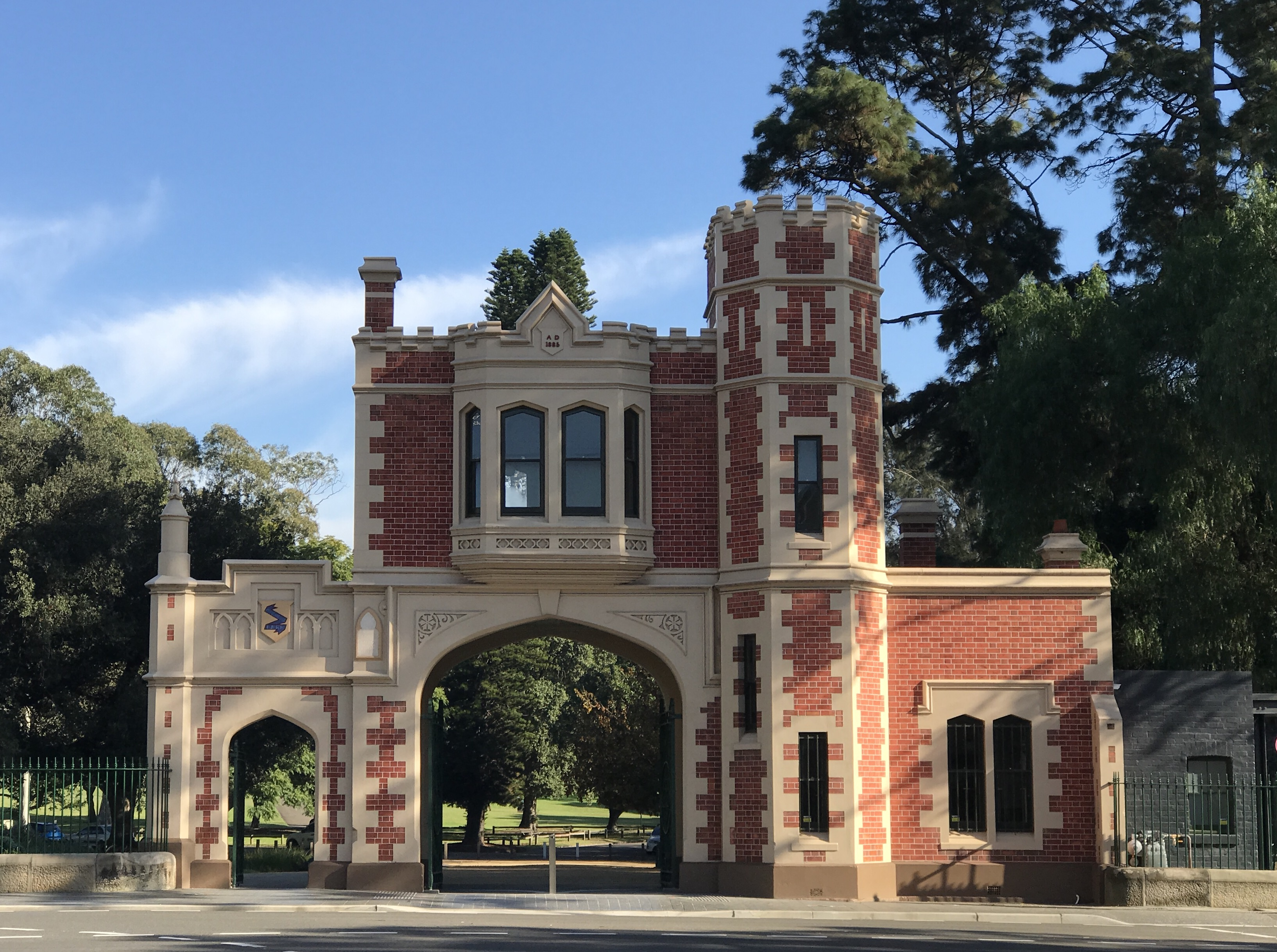
The George Street Gatehouse

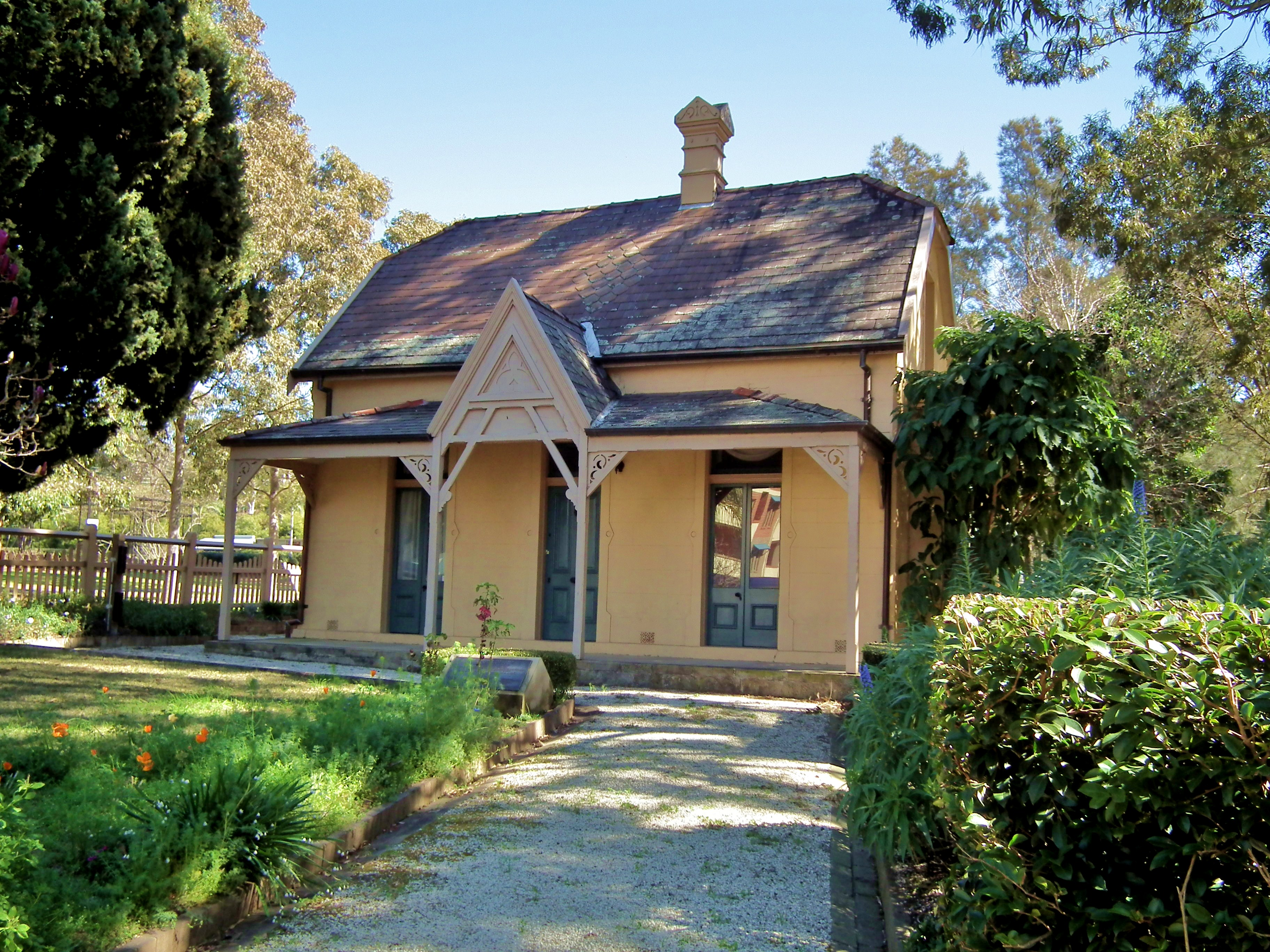
The Macquarie Street Gatehouse

The first gatehouse in this location was a stone lodge built by Governor Macquarie in 1820. Macquarie extended the then Government /Governor's Domain out (east) two blocks to O'Connell Street (formerly it had come up to Pitt Street/Row, far closer to Old Government House. He added a stone gate lodge.

In 1885 a two-storey brick Tudor Revival pattern book gate house replaced the first gate lodge which was demolished. Architect Gordon McKinnon designed the new gate house, local builders Hart & Lavor were paid £590 to build it, with local blacksmith T. Forsyth crafting its wrought iron gates. The lodge is identical to another built on a pastoral property in the Western District of Victoria. Historically the gatehouse keeper's wife provided picnickers in the park with hot water for tea.

Matilda and Samuel Case are believed to be the first residents of the "Tudor" Gatehouse, in 1885. In 1901 Gertrude and Lewis Taylor lived there with son Keith, born in the upstairs bedroom the following year. Also in 1902 William Entwhistle moved from the Mays Hill gatehouse to the George Street gatehouse. In the late 1930s Florence and Percy Wyles kept a small zoo, cared for the horses and ran a small shop in the lobby of the gatehouse. Until 1951 Joseph Rose's family lived there while the United States Army occupied Parramatta Park (Willoughby, 2013, citing Chris Rapp, "The History of a Gate House: the story of a Parramatta Park Entrance").

Mays Hill Gatehouse

This single storey cottage faces the Great Western Road, now the Great Western Highway.

Observatory Site

Governor Thomas Brisbane's Observatory site includes two transit stones, two marker trees (Himalayan or chir pine, Pinus roxburghii) to its south, two more chir pines near the Southern Domain gate house spaced the same distance apart as the two close to the observatory, centred exactly on the same north–south alignment extending through the gap in the transit stones (on the Great Western Highway) which probably mark the location of a marker stone), the Observatory Memorial (1880) obelisk and archaeological remains of the footings of both the 8.5-metre (28 ft) square observatory with its northern and southern domed ends and the former astronomer's cottage to its west.

Other buildings include(d):

- Westmead Gatehouse
- Governors' Bathhouse (now a gazebo/pavilion)
- Governor's Stables (demolished to construct the 1855 railway extension from Parramatta to Penrith)
- Dairy Complex and Salter's Cottage

== Timeline ==
- 1788: Government Farm founded at Rose Hill, and wheat, barley, corn and oats were planted in June and July that year. Part of the farm was in the Crescent of Parramatta Park, a former anabranch of the Parramatta River.
- 1790: Governor Phillip laid out the area of the Domain as part of the Parramatta township. It was located on the western edge of the original township, and contained a Governor's residence, stockyards, lumber yard, and the redoubt. It was also used for grazing and food cultivation, grazing continuing until 1900. Under Phillip a town plan was surveyed that included High Street (now George Street), running between the planned site of Government House and "The Landing Place", further down the river. High Street was 62 m (205 ft) wide and 1.6 km (1 mile) long. On each side of this street, the Government erected huts set 18 m (60 feet) apart and constructed to accommodate 10 persons. These were built of wattle and daub with thatched roofs, and measured 3.7 m × 7.3 m (12 ft × 24 ft). Convicts built the new street and huts from July 1790. From the early 1810s these were occupied by emancipated convicts and free settlers. From 1814/5 the huts were in disrepair and many were demolished as part of landscaping by Governor and Mrs Macquarie who pushed back (east) the township to create an expanded Governor's Domain. Huts were still standing outside the Domain in 1822 (now part of the Law Courts/Attorney-General's/Bloodbank/Parramatta District Hospital site).
- 1800–10 Governor King appears to have set up Australia's first public botanic garden, under Sir Joseph Banks' personal plant collector, George Caley, on the Government Farm. Caley also used Old Government house to mount and treat his plant collection/specimens. The character of the Domain was changed by the gradual removal of the stockyards, lumber yard etc. to other areas of the township and by Governor Macquarie who extended the domain east to O'Connell St and reworked the site according to currently fashionable picturesque principles. River Road dates to the Macquarie period (c. 1810–20).
- 1822: Governor Brisbane's observatory built on Coronation Hill
- 1823: Governor Brisbane's bath house built, completed in 1823, on Coronation Hill. Water pumped ex river, heated, drained to a duck pond near the Macquarie Street gatehouse
- 1850: Railway surveys undertaken to determine the desired alignment of a rail track west of Parramatta.
- 1858: Parramatta Park created as a Victorian People's Park for public access after much lengthy lobbying from the 1840s. Numerous adaptations, e.g.: additional paths, drives, planted avenues of trees, plantations, the George Street entrance - three playgrounds have been located near here (northwest of) since 1858.
- 1860: railway easement, an avenue of English oaks was planted along the length of River Road in the 1860s
- 1872: Players of the Wallaroo FC and The King's School rugby teams access the unoccupied Old Government House and lift and remove a door from its hinges so they can carry an injured player with a broken leg back to the town to seek medical assistance.
- 1886: Governor Brisbane's former bath house converted into an open arched rooved pavilion
- 1904: Boer War Memorial and cannon erected, memorial re-cycling Doric columns off the former Parramatta Court house complex, on the southwest corner of Church & George Streets
- 1911: Memorial to Parramatta resident William Hart, first Australian to fly a plane on a cross-country flight, from Penrith to Parramatta, touching down in the park on 4 November. The flight took 23 minutes.
- 1913: loss of 0.9 ha (2.2 acres) to Parramatta High School
- 1923 and 1965: loss of 1.8 ha (4.4 acres) to public roads
- 1952: loss of 1.1 ha (2.7 acres) to RSL Club
- 1958: loss of 0.3 ha (0.74 acres) to Children's Home
- 1967: dedication of Old Government House
- 1981: loss of 8 ha (20 acres) to Parramatta Stadium. Stadium Trust has had control of the stadium and surrounds since March 1989.
- c. 1985: Burramatta Visitors' Centre (then kiosk) built, designed by Tonkin Zulaikha
- 1990s: Visitor's Centre renovated, interpretive display on park heritage installed.
- 1998: major refurbishment of George Street entry playground area including excavation to 600-millimetre (24 in) depth and excavation of 30 post holes – an archaeological monitoring program accompanied the works. (finding a largely intact soil profile to a depth of greater than 300 mm (12 in) beneath the playground).
- 2003: Sealing and edging River Road, and two car park areas north and south of the Burramatta visitors' centre, construction of a bus/set-down bay and minor drainage improvements
- 2004 approval for demolition of three existing toilet blocks and construction of new amenities around the park.
- 2010: Lady Fitzroy memorial obelisk: commenced conservation (underpinning) works; commenced comprehensive assessment of Park archaeological collection; completed research for a publication on World Heritage Area values; completed conservation of Pitt Street 1880s dwarf stone/iron palisade fence; finished Parramatta River bank restoration project to restore eroded banks and improve access; footpath and cycleway improvements; resurfacing of Railway Parade, Governor Macquarie Carriageway and Federal Avenue; built 600-metre (2,000 ft) shared path on northern riverbank from Old Kings Oval to O'Connell Street; planted Sydney Coastal River-Flat Forest species and Aboriginal food and fibre plants as part of Burramatta Aboriginal Landscape trail; built two concrete cricket wickets

== Heritage listings ==
On 2 April 1999, the property was listed on the New South Wales State Heritage Register as a site of State significance with the following citation:

This building, built c.1799 and enlarged 1815 to a design by Lieutenant John Watts, was associated with the administration of the colony from its early days until superseded by the 1845 Government House on the shores of Sydney Harbour. It has now been suitably restored and seems to illustrate the best of elegant colonial Georgian architecture of the period. Used by the King's School 1910-70.

— Statement of significance, New South Wales State Heritage Register.

The Old Government House and the Government Domain were included in the Australian National Heritage List on 1 August 2007.

In July 2010, at the 34th session of the UNESCO World Heritage Committee, Old Government House and Domain, as well as ten other Australian sites with a significant association with convict transportation, were inscribed as a group on the World Heritage List as the Australian Convict Sites. The listing explains that the 11 sites present "the best surviving examples of large-scale convict transportation and the colonial expansion of European powers through the presence and labour of convicts". Of the 11 sites the Hyde Park Barracks, Old Great North Road and Cockatoo Island are also within the Sydney region. At the time of nomination, on 12 January 2007, Old Government House was described as a "powerful symbol of the colony of New South Wales, the inter-connections with convict sites in other colonies, and the development of the nation."

== See also ==
- First Government House, Sydney, residence of the Governor from 1788 to 1845
- Government House, Sydney, the present residence of the Governor
- Cranbrook, Bellevue Hill, the residence of the Governor from 1900 to 1914
- Government Houses of Australia
- List of National Trust properties in Australia
