= Macquarie Street Gatehouse =

Historic building in New South Wales

Coordinates: 33°48′50″S 150°59′51″E

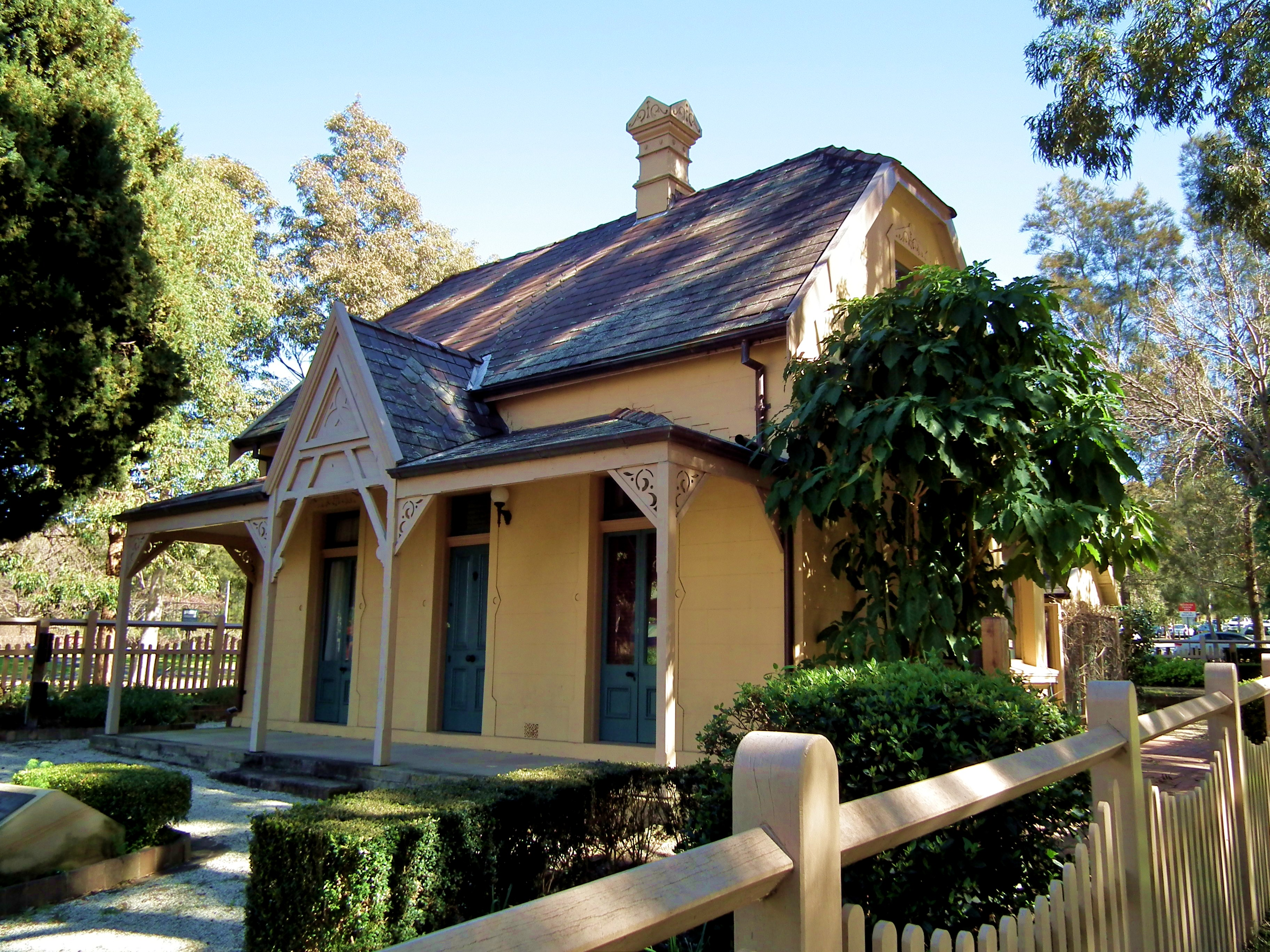
The Macquarie Street Gatehouse, Parramatta Park

The Macquarie Street Gatehouse at the Macquarie Street entrance of Parramatta Park in Parramatta, New South Wales, Australia, is a building of historical significance and is listed on the Heritage Register. It dates back to 1848, when the first gatehouse was built following the death of Lady Mary Fitzroy. The present house, which was largely constructed in 1887, was built around this original dwelling. The building was designed as a gatekeeper's cottage, with a separate room set aside for the use of the Parramatta Park Trust. It is a typical example of High Victorian Gothic architecture, which was very popular at that time. Today the house is used as a café.

== Early history ==
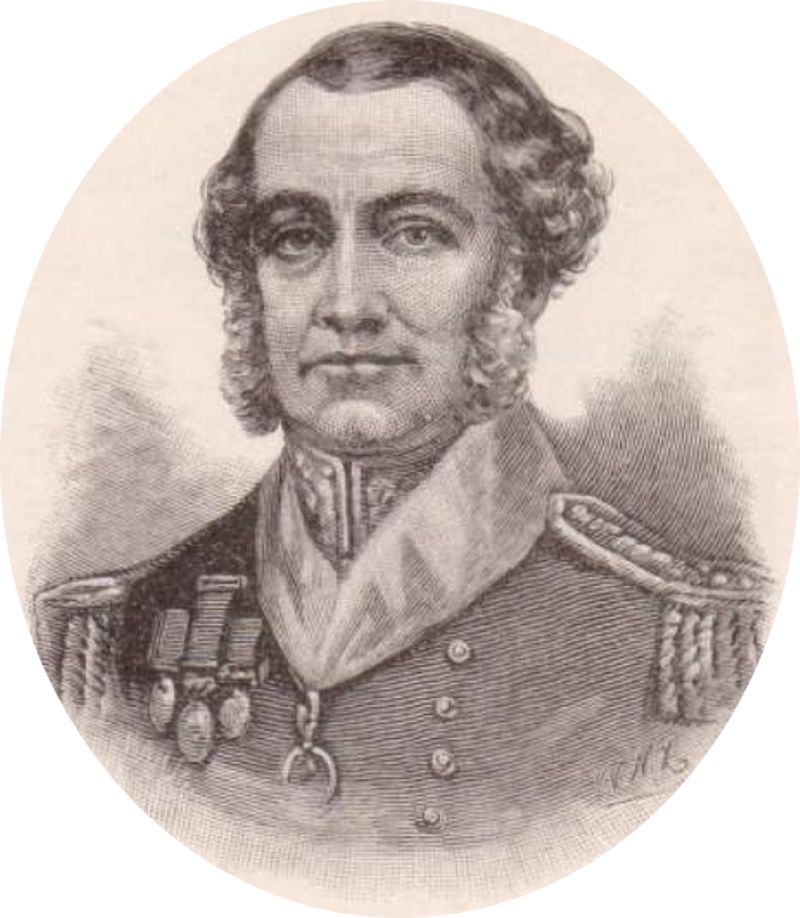
Governor Sir Charles Fitzroy

The original building was constructed in 1848, immediately after a tragic accident to the wife of Governor Sir Charles Fitzroy, who was then living in Government House. Governor Fitzroy and his wife, Lady Mary, accompanied by Lieutenant Charles Masters, were on their way to a wedding when the horses bolted soon after leaving the house and their carriage overturned near the entrance in George Street. Sir Charles was not seriously injured, but both Lady Mary and Lieutenant Masters were killed. A full account of the accident was given in the newspaper Bell's Life. A memorial obelisk commemorates their deaths at the site of the tree where the accident occurred.

Sir Charles was deeply affected by the tragedy, and he felt he could not bear to use the George Street entrance again, so he arranged for the construction of the Macquarie Street gatehouse. The following month, in January 1848, a newspaper made the following report:

Workmen have commenced opening a new entrance at the end of Macquarie-street—at the angle formed by the turning of that street into Pitt-row to the Government Domain. It is purposed that the present entrance at the end of George-street shall be closed by the erection of a dead wall.

This was a new gateway with a small cottage for the gatekeeper. This cottage subsequently became the present gatehouse when major alterations and additions were made to it in 1887 by the Parramatta Park Trust.

== Reilly family ==
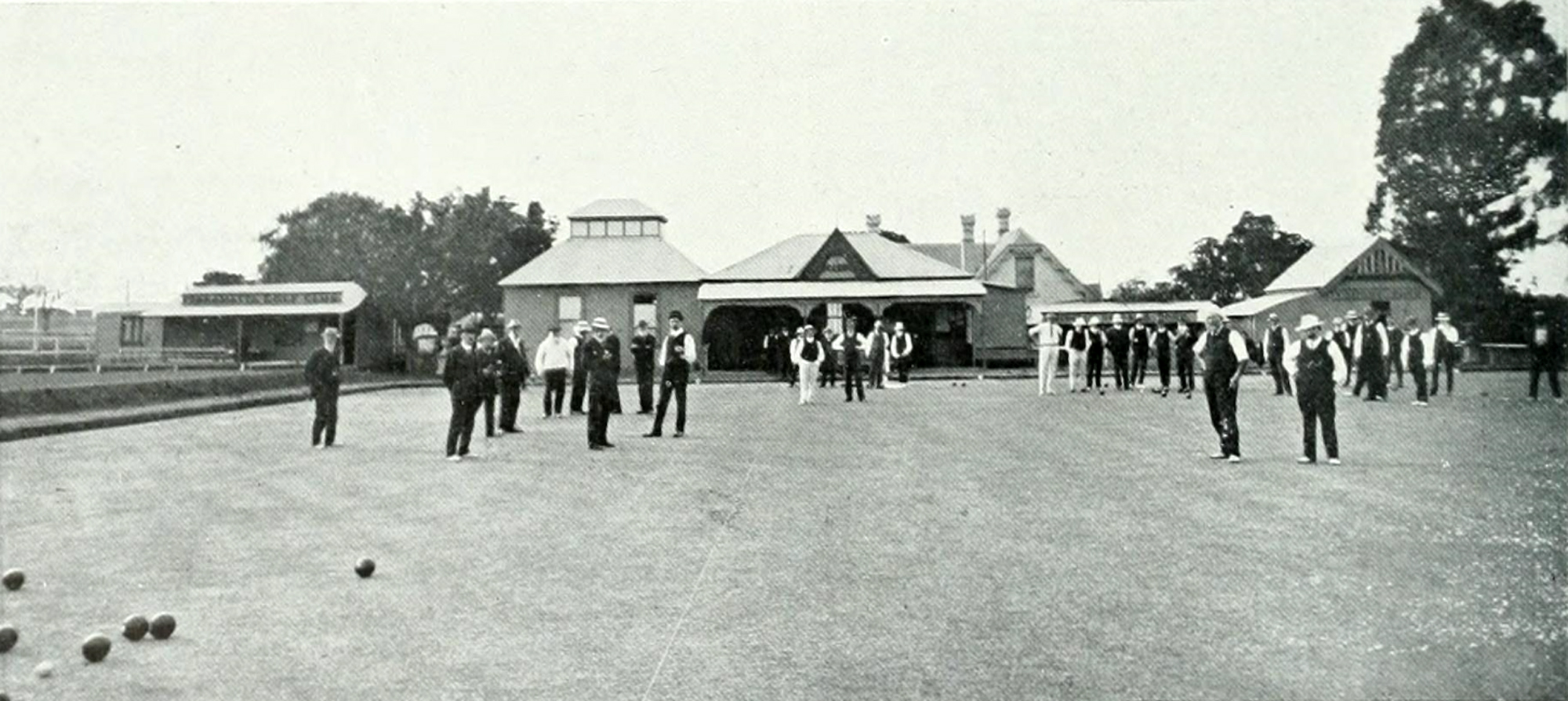
Parramatta Bowling Club in 1911, with the Macquarie Street Gatehouse in the background, behind the clubhouse

The first gatekeeper in the new 1887 Victorian cottage was Mrs Bridget Reilly (often misspelt Riley), who had been recently widowed. It was not unusual for the Parramatta Park Trust to appoint ladies to this role, as the Sands Directory for 1905 shows that three of the gatekeepers in the park were women. The duties of the gatekeepers were to open the gates in the morning and close them at dusk. They were also responsible for keeping within the park the cows and horses for whom the park trust received adjustment fees. There were sometimes disagreements about this duty, which were described in a newspaper. The gatekeepers also provided hot water at a small charge to picnickers who wished to make some tea.

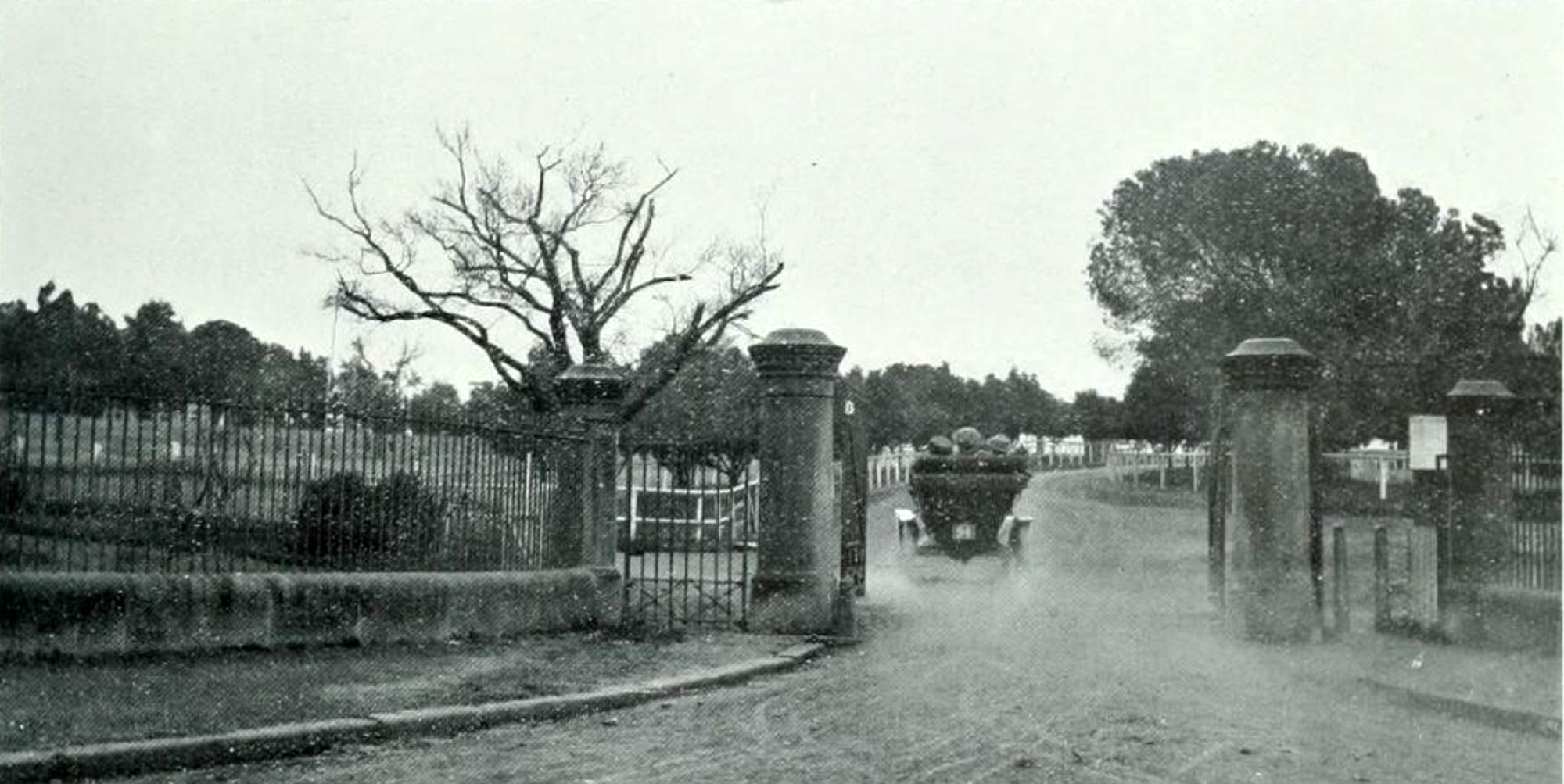
The Macquarie Street gates in 1911. The garden of the gatehouse can be seen on the left.

Mrs Bridget Reilly (née Lynch) came to Australia as an assisted immigrant at the age of 23 after her parents died. She arrived in Sydney on the ship Telegraph and found employment as a general servant. In 1857 she married William Reilly in Parramatta. The couple had three children: Ellen (born 1861), Mary Ann (born 1862) and William Edmund (born 1864), who was one of the first pupils enrolled in 1875 in the newly opened Parramatta Marist High School.

Bridget's husband William died in 1887, and soon afterward she was offered the position of gatekeeper. She moved with her three adult children into the Macquarie Street gatehouse in the same year. Mary Ann became a dressmaker, and William Edmund became a plumber. They both continued to live at the gatehouse with their mother Bridget until she died in 1916.

After Bridget died, her daughter Mary Ann became the gatekeeper. In 1917 there was a newspaper report about the part that Mary Ann played, in her role as gatekeeper, in finding a lost child. She and her sister Ellen (who was an invalid) did not marry, and they both lived in the gatehouse until she retired in about 1927. They then moved to a house in Sorrell Street, Parramatta, and lived out their lives.

== Sarah Jane Restall ==
Mrs Sarah Jane Restall became the gatekeeper about 1927, shortly after her husband died. Sarah lived at the Macquarie Street gatehouse for several years. Then, in 1932, she met Anton Dietmair, and they decided to marry. On the eve of their wedding, her friends held a surprise party in her home which was described in the local newspaper in the following terms:

A number of the intimate friends of Mrs. Restall, of the Park Gate House, Macquarie-street, Parramatta, assembled at her residence on Wednesday night last to pay tribute to that lady on the eve of her marriage to Mr. A. Dietmair, which was to be quietly solemnised on the following day. The company, numbering 35, assembled at the Centennial Fountain at 7.30 and marched en masse to the home of Mrs. Restall. The guest of honor was greeted with hearty cheers and the singing of "For She's a Jolly Good Fellow" ... The company forthwith took control of the home, and set about to make the evening one to be remembered. The lawn was utilised for outdoor amusement, whilst the large drawing-room was devoted to games and dancing. Mr. Haylock was master of ceremonies, whilst Mr. A. Shortland ... supplied music on an accordion.

The marriage, however, was not a success, and several years later Sarah obtained a divorce. She continued to live in Parramatta until she married again in 1941. Her husband was George Henry Wadsworth, who came from Victoria. After he died, she returned to Parramatta and lived out her life in 1945 at the age of 81.

== Harvey family ==
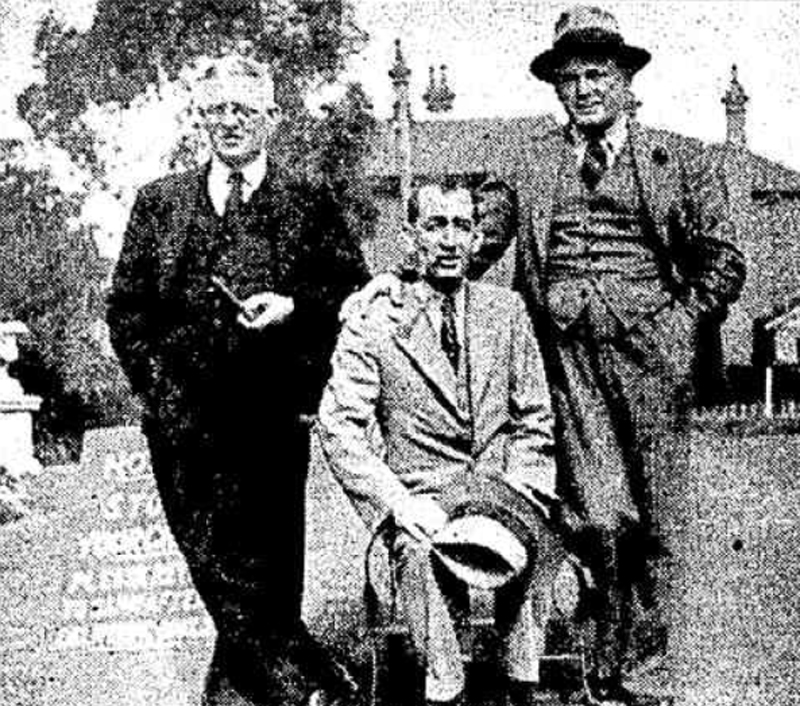
Charles Herbert Harvey (left) with two friends at Parramatta Bowling Club, 1936, when he was gatekeeper

Charles Herbert Harvey became gatekeeper about 1934, soon after his retirement from the army. He had previously been a Warrant Officer at the Parramatta Lancer Barracks. In 1899 he married in Paddington Isobel Mabel McCallum, who was born in New Zealand. He went to Sydney University and became a laboratory assistant at the medical Sshool. In 1899 he served in the Boer War. Then, in 1910, he joined the military forces and fought in World War I. He remained in the army until his retirement in 1931.

The couple lived in Parramatta for most of their married lives and were involved in community affairs. Charles joined the Parramatta Musical and Dramatic Society and assisted with the production of their many theatrical events. He also joined the Parramatta Bowling Club, which at that time was located next to the gatehouse. He became Secretary of the club in 1932 and remained in this position for almost fifteen years. He died in 1952 and was buried at the Northern Suburbs Crematorium. The Electoral Roll shows that Isobel, his wife, continued to live at the gatehouse until about 1960 and then moved to Pennant Hills Rd in Parramatta. She died in 1978 at the age of 97.

== Today ==
The building today is called the Gatehouse Tea Rooms and serves high teas, light meals and other beverages, including wine.

== Description ==
The cottage is a two-storey Gothic style brick structure stuccoed and painted to represent standard 610 x 305mm stone jointing. There are three original downstairs residential rooms comprising a living room with bay windows and french doors opening onto the east verandah, kitchen (with a fuel stove still in place), and a third room presumed to be a dining room, all connected by a hall leading from the entry portico on the north elevation of the building. The trust meeting room was entered from a separate lobby centrally located in the symmetrical eastern façade. The trust meeting room has a set of french doors opening onto the verandah, balancing the living room doors. Upstairs the house provides three bedrooms within the rake of the roof.

These low ceiling spaces were finished with board linings and in general the finishes and details are less elaborate than the more public spaces such as the living room and trust meeting room. The roof is purple grey slates with inset lighter coloured slate diamond shapes in the east face and both sides of the central gable to the verandah. The three chimneys have elaborate rendered mouldings and triangular pediment forms to the four faces at the top. The east verandah and north portico are constructed in heavily moulded timber with extensive use of small struts and brackets at post to beam connections typical of domestic gothic timber detailing. A feature of the external joinery work is the repetitive use of stop chamfers on beams, posts and struts.

== Heritage listing ==
The Macquarie Street Gatehouse derives its significance from its association with the Park, its function as a gatekeeper's cottage and its association with the Parramatta Park Trustees. The building was designed as a gate keepers cottage with a separate room set aside for the use of the Parramatta Park Trust. The historic visual relationship between the cottage and the town centre created by the vista along Macquarie Street is of cultural significance. As a group, the Parramatta Park gatehouses are of state significance for their archaeological, architectural, social and landscape values.
