= Bloodsworth Island =

Island in Chesapeake Bay, USA

- Location within Maryland Location within the United States

Geography
- Location: Chesapeake Bay
- Coordinates: 38°10′36″N 76°03′08″W

Administration
- United States
- State: Maryland

Demographics
- Population: 0

Bloodsworth Island is an island in the Chesapeake Bay. It lies in southern Dorchester County, Maryland. Historic research suggests that sites discovered in an archaeological investigation of the northern third of the island were associated with families who worked in the nineteenth-century Chesapeake Bay oystering industry, with settlements dating as far back as 1672. In 1799 the entire island became the property of Robert Bloodsworth, Sr., but the island did not become known as Bloodsworth Island until about 1850. The island was inhabited by Bloodsworth descendants until 1918, when the last residents moved to the mainland. Bloodsworth grave sites still exist on the island in a small cemetery at the northern end of the island. The island was purchased by Albanus Phillips on behalf of the Phillips Packing Company of Cambridge, Maryland. The company operated small crabbing ventures on the island. In 1923 the island became the Bloodsworth Island Game Preserve.

== History ==
=== Bloodsworth Island Range ===
The island was acquired by the U.S. Navy in 1942. From 1942 to 1995, the United States Navy used the island as a shore bombardment and bombing range for firing and dropping live ordnance from ships and aircraft. This included bombs, small and large caliber ammunition, rockets, and missiles that contained explosives, propellants, and other energetics. Due to extensive contamination by unexploded ordnance, the island is currently off-limits to the public, as are the waters within 75 yards of the shoreline.

Navy administration of the island passed from Joint Expeditionary Base–Little Creek to Patuxent River Naval Air Station in 2001.

== In popular culture ==
The episode "What We Become" in the AMC original series The Walking Dead features the island as a major location. Newcomer Virgil says he is from a community living on Bloodsworth Island and he is trying to return. The episode ends with Michonne (Danai Gurira) accompanying Virgil, presumably to return to Bloodsworth Island to obtain weapons.

== Gallery ==
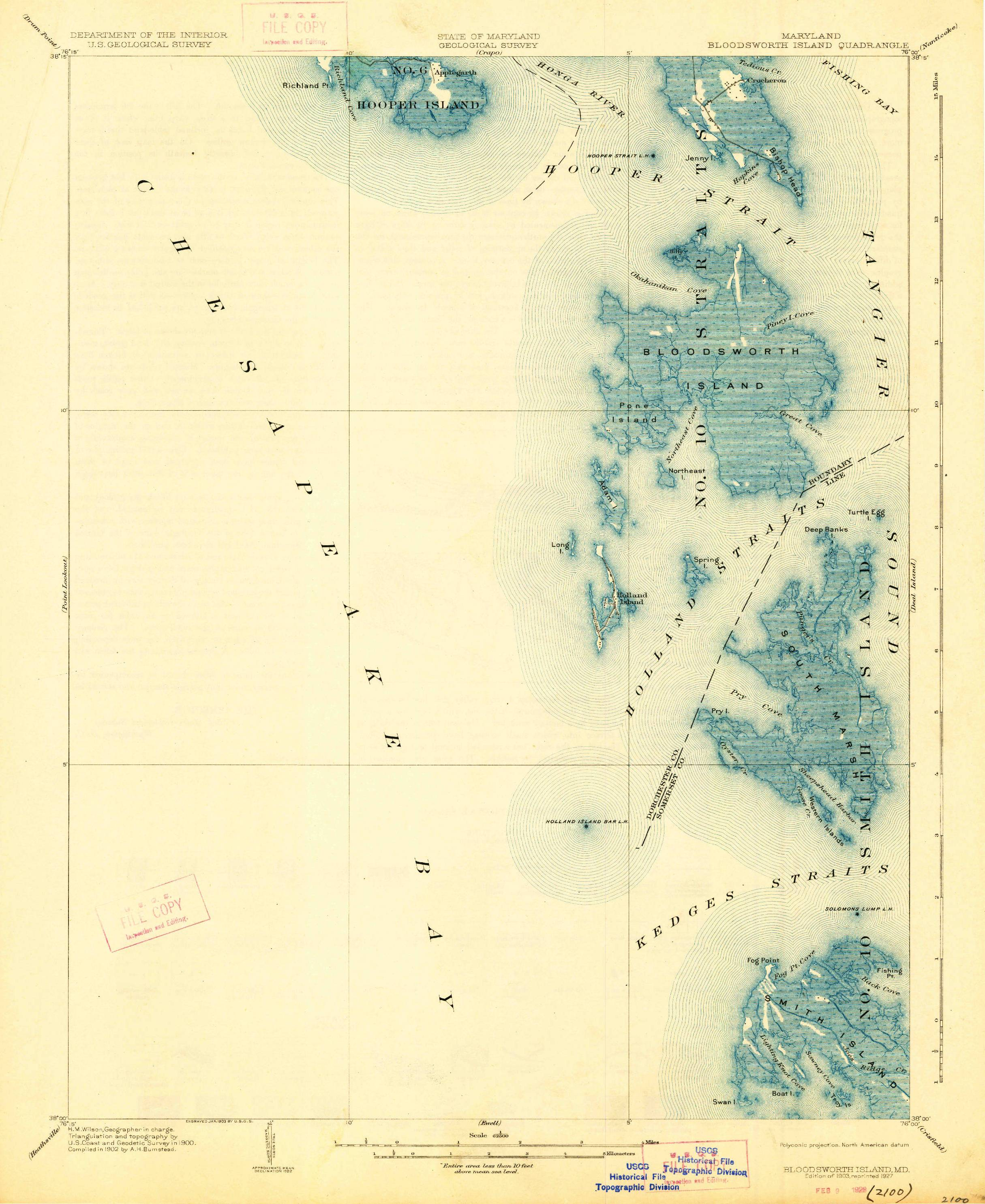
1903 topographic map.
