= Rhoda Bloodworth =

New Zealand labour activist, community worker and feminist

Rhoda Alice Bloodworth (22 June 1889 – 23 December 1980) was a New Zealand labour activist, community worker and feminist. She was born in Skipton, Yorkshire, England on 22 June 1889.
