= Margaret Bloodworth =

Canadian lawyer and civil servant

Margaret Bloodworth, CM (born 1949) is a Canadian lawyer and civil servant. Bloodworth is the former National Security Advisor to Canadian Prime Minister Stephen Harper.

Born in 1949, in Winnipeg, Manitoba, Bloodworth is a graduate of the University of Winnipeg and the University of Ottawa Faculty of Law. She was called to the Ontario Bar in 1979.

Previously the Deputy Minister of the Department of Public Safety and Emergency Preparedness Canada and an Associate Secretary to the Cabinet, Privy Council Office, Bloodworth was appointed to her most recent position on October 10, 2006.

In 2011, she was made a Member of the Order of Canada.

In 2016, she was awarded an honorary Doctor of Laws from Carleton University.
