= James Bloodworth Jr. =

American physician

James M. B. Bloodworth Jr.
- Born: February 21, 1925; Atlanta, GA
- Died: September 22, 2006 (age 81); Madison, Wisconsin
- Citizenship: US
- Education: Ohio State University; Emory University; Stanford University
- Known for: Research in diabetes mellitus
- Scientific career
- Fields: Medicine; Pathology; Endocrinology
- Workplaces: University of Wisconsin

James Morgan Bartow Bloodworth Jr. (February 21, 1925 – September 22, 2006) was an American physician, pathologist, and researcher on diabetes mellitus. He was born in Atlanta on February 21, 1925, to J. M. Bartow Bloodworth Sr.—an attorney—and Elizabeth (née Dimmock) Bloodworth. Bloodworth died on September 22, 2006, in Madison, Wisconsin.

== Education ==
Bloodworth completed his college studies at Emory University in Atlanta and Stanford University in California, culminating in a B.S. degree from the former school in 1945. Bloodworth also received his M.D. from Emory University in 1948. He served a rotating internship at Columbia-Presbyterian Medical Center in New York City and went on to pursue residency training at Ohio State University (OSU) in Columbus, Ohio.

== Professional life ==
Bloodworth began his academic career as a faculty member at OSU in 1953. In 1962, he accepted a faculty appointment at the University of Wisconsin Medical School (UWMS) in Madison. He worked there for the remainder of his career, attaining the rank of full professor. Bloodworth also served as chief of the laboratory service at the William Shainline Middleton Veterans Hospital (MVH) in Madison until 1989. When a new University of Wisconsin Hospital was opened in 1979, Bloodworth became director of the combined autopsy service at that institution and the MVH. He had become a national consultant on the use of the autopsy as a quality-control procedure in medicine. As the senior forensic pathologist at the UWMS, he was also a consultant to many Wisconsin county coroners.

Bloodworth was an active member of several professional societies, including the American Society for Experimental Pathology, the Endocrine Society, the American Diabetes Association, the Society for Experimental Biology and Medicine, and the American Society of Clinical Endocrinology. He served as president of the Wisconsin Society of Pathologists from 1978 to 1980.

Bloodworth was a consistently-active medical school instructor in cardiovascular, renal, and endocrine pathology. He also devoted a great deal of his time to the instruction of pathology residents at the UWMS. In order to augment diagnostic accuracy, Bloodworth introduced the use of electron microscopy at that institution. Bloodworth's personal research interests concerned diabetes mellitus, other endocrine disorders, and renal pathology, and he spoke at many national meetings on those topics. He employed histochemistry and ultrastructural studies to assess lesions of the pancreatic islet cells and blood vessels in patients with diabetes mellitus. In animal models, he was also able to produce changes in the renal glomeruli that recapitulated lesions seen in the kidneys of humans with advanced diabetes. Together with his colleagues, he focused on the causes and prevention of microangiopathy in diabetes mellitus. In particular, his studies of diabetic retinopathy, in collaboration with ophthalmological colleagues at UWMS, defined the progression of changes that eventuate in retinal hemorrhages, plaques, exudates, and other lesions producing visual compromise. His experimental studies in dogs showed that meticulous control of glucose metabolism could effectively prevent diabetic angiopathy. For his contributions to the field of endocrinology, Bloodworth received the prestigious Eli Lilly Research Award on behalf of the American Diabetes Association in 1963. Bloodworth's professional activities also included other areas of endocrine pathology as well. In 1968, he edited and largely authored the first systematic textbook on the pathology of the endocrine system. That publication was subsequently updated by Bloodworth in 1982 and continued in a third edition, edited by Juan Lechago and Victor Gould.

== Personal life and death ==
Bloodworth married Jean Stone in 1947 and had three daughters with her. In 1972, he married Joan Wiltgen and had two more daughters. Bloodworth retired in 1995. He died of cardiovascular disease in September 2006 in Madison, Wisconsin, where he is buried. In addition to his immediate family, Bloodworth was survived by a younger brother, A. W. Franklin Bloodworth, a retired attorney in Atlanta, Georgia.
