= James Bloodsworth =

18th-century English convict sent to Australia

- Born: 7 March 1759; Kingston upon Thames, England
- Died: 21 March 1804 (aged 45); South Row, Sydney (O'Connell Street), Sydney
- Other names: Bloedworth, Bloodworth
- Occupations: Brickmaker and bricklayer
- Spouse: Jane Marks
- Partner: Sarah Bellamy

James Bloodsworth (7 March 1759 – 21 March 1804) was a convict sentenced for the theft of one game cock and two hens at Esher, Surrey. James was a master bricklayer and builder responsible for the construction of most of the buildings in the colony of New South Wales between 1788 and 1800. James Bloodsworth was living at Kingston upon Thames, England and been tried at Kingston upon Thames Quarter Sessions on the 3 October 1785, when sentenced to seven years' transportation.

== Convict years ==
In 1788 Bloodsworth was sent to New South Wales (Australia) in the First Fleet onboard Charlotte and was immediately appointed master bricklayer in the settlement at Sydney Cove. In March 1788 brick-making began at Long Cove (this site was later named Cockle Bay, and, still later, Darling Harbour) under his instruction. The site became known as the Brickfield. The approximate area is at the lower end of George Street, now known as Haymarket. In addition to bricks, the same plant burned clay roof tiles which offered greatly improved weather proofing, durability and dignity to the burgeoning public buildings. Since there were no architects in the fleet he was largely responsible for the design and the erection of Australia's first buildings, although the army and navy officers in the settlement had some knowledge of architecture. Bloodsworth was placed in charge of a gang of labourers who were responsible for the erection of the first brick huts built by May 1788.

Besides designing many private houses, Bloodsworth can be credited with the first Government House (located on what is now the south-west corner of Phillip and Bridge Streets, Sydney), which lasted from 1788 to 1845, and in 1790 the storehouse at King's Wharf on the shore of Sydney Cove. On 4 June 1789, just sixteen months after the first landing at Sydney Cove, the early settlers gathered to celebrate the birthday of King George III and the grand opening of Government House. Governor Arthur Phillip praised "the pains he had taken to teach others the business of a bricklayer", and his conduct was exemplary at a time when most convicts were noted for indolence or rebelliousness. Bloodsworth worked under difficulties; although there were competent bricklayers among the convicts, they had no proper mortar to bind the bricks together. For the walls of Government House some lime mortar was obtained by burning oyster shells, but elsewhere mud-mortar had to be used. This was far from satisfactory, but by adapting his construction methods to these crude conditions he produced serviceable buildings, which also were by no means unseemly, because he was working within the long-established rules of Georgian architecture.

== Post convict years ==
Bloodsworth was pardoned in 1790 and on 1 September 1791 was appointed superintendent over all the brickmakers and bricklayers. Next year he was offered rehabilitation to England, but he declined. In 1803 when offered a choice of employment at Port Phillip or the Derwent he again refused, preferring to remain in Sydney. In 1802 he had become a sergeant in the Sydney Loyal Association, a great mark of respect to a former convict. At that time he was farming his grant of fifty acres (20 hectares) at Petersham; later he increased his holdings to 245 acres (99 ha).

== Death ==
Although Bloodsworth had the asset of his farm and his government salary of £50, he was insolvent when he died from pneumonia on 21 March 1804 at his house on South Row, Sydney. Because of the high regard the settlers had for him, Governor Philip Gidley King ordered that he be given the nearest the young colony could provide to a state funeral. The Sydney Loyal Association escorted the cortège with muffled drums, and the body was laid in the old Sydney burial ground on 23 March, with military honours. He was survived by two sons and two daughters.

From the Sydney Gazette 25 March 1804 No.56

DEATHS

On Wednesday last died, generally lamented, Mr. James Bloodsworth, for many years Superintendent of Builders in the Employ of Government. He came to the Colony among its first inhabitants in the year 1788, and obtained the Appointment, from his exemplary conduct, shortly after his arrival; the first house in this part of the Southern Hemisphere was by him erected, and most of the Public Buildings since have been under his direction. To lament his loss he has left a widow and five children, the youngest an infant now only one week old; and the complaint which terminated in his dissolution was supposed to proceed from a severe cold contracted about two months ago. Died 21 January 1804 Buried Old Sydney Burial Ground 23 January 1804
J.E. BRAY.
The Attention and concern which prevailed at the interment of the deceased was sufficient testimonies of the respect with which he filled and the integrity with which he uninterruptedly discharged the duties of a Public Trust during so long a period........
His Excellency was pleased to order that "THE FUNERAL SHOULD BE PROVIDED AT THE PUBLIC EXPENSE" and to shew other marks of attention to so old a Servant of the Crown. Four in the afternoon of Friday being at the wish of the widow appointed for the Funeral, the Relics of the deceased were at that hour removed from his house in South Street, and conveyed to the place of interment attended by a great number of friends, among whom were most of the Sydney Loyal Association, in which he had been appointed Sergeant.

Opposite to his old residence a Procession was formed, which moved in the following order:-

- 12 of the Loyal Association, arms reversed
- Sergeant of the Association
- Drum muffled & Fife
- THE BIER
- Two sons, chief Mourners followed by an infant daughter
- Fourteen Female Mourners
- Twenty-four male Mourners
- A number of respectable inhabitants in Rank
- The Non Commissioned Officers of the N.S.W. Corps
- And a Crowd of spectators

When near the burial ground the Association were obliged to file off, for the accommodation of the friends of the deceased, and the populace, who were become very numerous; and when the remains were deposited approached the grave and performed military honours.

== See also ==
- List of convicts transported to Australia
