= Cave-dwelling frog =

Conservation status
- Least Concern (IUCN 3.1)

Scientific classification
- Kingdom: Animalia
- Phylum: Chordata
- Class: Amphibia
- Order: Anura
- Family: Pelodryadidae
- Genus: Pelodryas
- Species: P. cavernicola

Binomial name
- Pelodryas cavernicola (Tyler & Davies, 1979)

Synonyms
- Litoria cavernicola (Tyler & Davies, 1979)

Species of amphibian

The cave-dwelling frog (Pelodryas cavernicola) is a large species of tree frog in the family Pelodryadidae. It is endemic to the extreme north-west of Australia, particularly the Mitchell Plateau (including Mitchell River National Park), Prince Regent River region, the Mueller Ranges and Bigge Island. As suggested by its name, the cave-dwelling frog inhabits caves and deep crevices in the rocky escarpments that typify the Kimberleys region.

The appearance of the cave-dwelling frog is typical of the genus Pelodryas which are large, green tree frogs. Two other species of Pelodryas inhabit the Kimberleys: the Australian green tree frog and Magnificent tree frog, but the cave-dwelling frog is smaller and slighter in build than both of these species.
