= Charlotte Medal =

Silver medallion

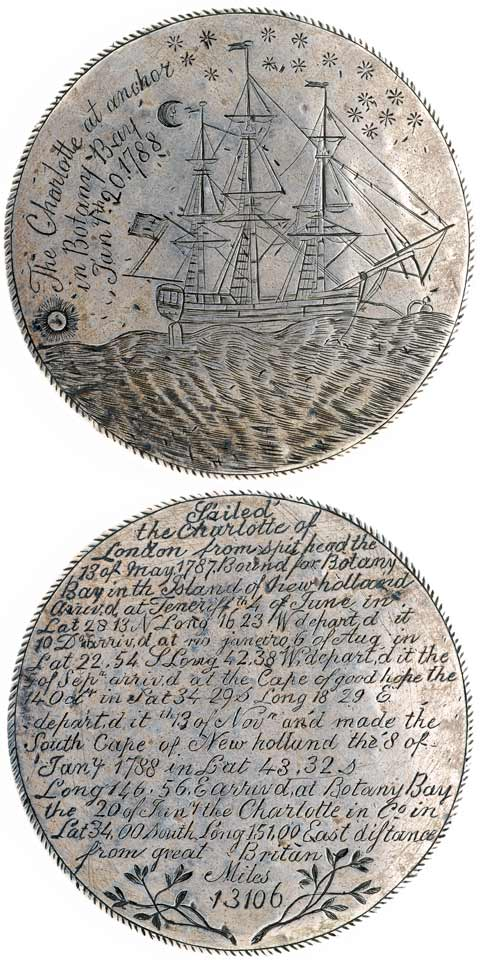
The Charlotte Medal

The Charlotte Medal is a silver medallion, 74 millimetres (2.9 in) in diameter, depicting the voyage of the convict transport Charlotte, with the First Fleet, to Sydney, New South Wales, Australia. Its obverse depicts the ship and the reverse is inscribed with a description of the journey. Struck by convict Thomas Barrett upon arriving in Botany Bay aboard Charlotte in January 1788, the medal is said to be the first work of Australian colonial art. Within a month, Barrett became the first person to be executed in the new colony.

== Creation ==
During the journey Charlotte visited Rio de Janeiro. While at anchor, one of the ship's convicts, a forger and mutineer by the name of Thomas Barrett was caught giving locals fake coins made from buckles, buttons, and spoons. The Surgeon-general of the Fleet, John White was impressed with his skill in making these forgeries, without having the apparent tools and other means to do so. This led him to commission Barrett to make the medal, to commemorate the journey, possibly from the surgeon's silver kidney dish.

== Inscriptions ==
The obverse of the medal depicts Charlotte at anchor at night in Botany Bay. The inscription reads

The Charlotte at anchor in Botany Bay Jan'y ^{th}.20.1788

The reverse of the medal is inscribed with a journal of the voyage. It reads

Sailed the Charlotte of London from Spit head the 13 of May 1787. Bound for Botany Bay in th Island of new holland arriv,d at Teneriff ^{th}4 of June in Lat 28 13 N Long 16 23 W depart,d it 10 D', arriv,d at rio janeiro 6 of Aug in Lat 22,54 S Long 42,38 W, depart,d it the 5 of Sep' arriv,d at the Cape of good hope the 14 Oct' in Lat 34 29 S Long 18 29 E depart,d it ^{th}13 of Nov' and made the South Cape of New Holland the 8 of Jan 4 1788 in Lat 43,32 S Long 146,56 E arrivd at Botany Bay the 20 of Jan' the Charlotte in C^{o} in Lat 34.00 South Long 151.00 East distance from great Britan Miles 13106

== Owners and ANMM purchase ==
It is unknown who owned the medal after White. It is possible that he presented it with his voyage findings, or it stayed with his family after his death, but at some point before 1919 it came into the possession of Princess Victoria and Prince Louis. In 1919, it was sold via Sotheby, Wilkinson & Hodge to a British numismatist, Henry Baldwin.

In 1967, it was sold to an American numismatist, John J Ford. In 1981, it was sold to a Melbourne dentist, Dr John Chapman, for $15,000 at Spink Sydney Auction. Dr Chapman donated a medal containing a reproduction of the Charlotte Medal to Museum Victoria to mark its bicentennial, in 1988.

In 2008, the Australian National Maritime Museum, with funds from the National Cultural Heritage Account, authorised through the Australian Government, won an auction for the medal with a bid of $750,000. The final price was $873,750, with $200,000 of NCH funding.

This makes it possible that, despite its age, the medal has only been sold four times.

== Copper medal ==
A smaller copper medallion, with a diameter of 47 millimetres (1.9 in), was created at the same time. The medal was made for White's personal servant, William Broughton and omits the ship scene, being inscribed simply with an abridged version of the journey. The medallion was uncovered during house restoration in the early 1940s. It has been suggested that this medal should "rank as equal in rarity and significance" as its silver counterpart.
