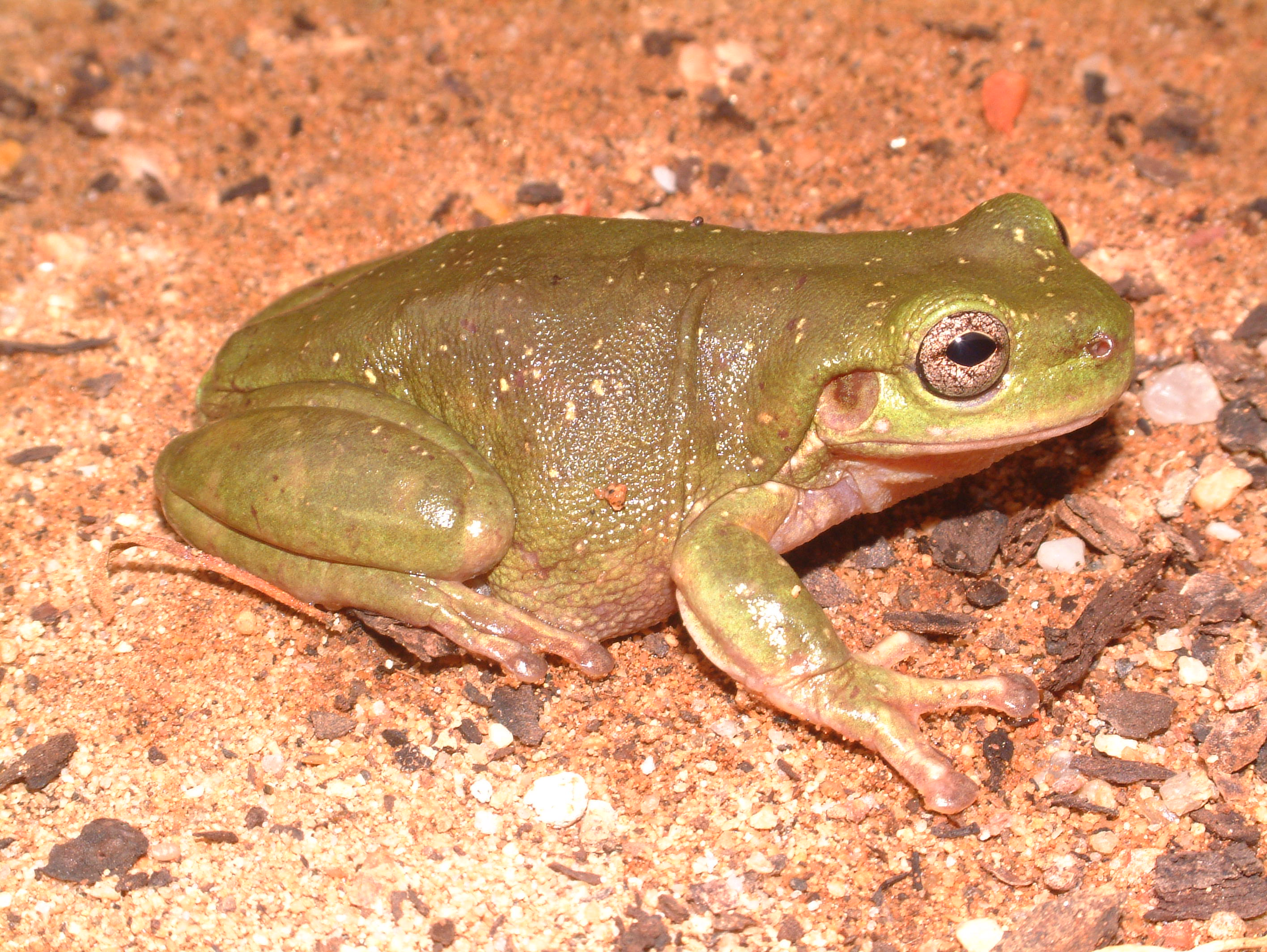

Conservation status
- Least Concern (IUCN 3.1)

Scientific classification
- Kingdom: Animalia
- Phylum: Chordata
- Class: Amphibia
- Order: Anura
- Family: Pelodryadidae
- Genus: Pelodryas
- Species: P. gilleni

Binomial name
- Pelodryas gilleni (Spencer, 1896)

= Centralian tree frog =

Species of amphibian

The Centralian tree frog (Pelodryas gilleni) is a large species of tree frog native to a small area in central Australia. It is closely related to the Australian green tree frog, and closely resembles it in appearance.

== Description ==
It is a large tree frog, reaching a length of 8 cm (3.1 in) in females and 6.2 cm (2.4 in) in males. The dorsal surface is green or olive green, while the ventral surface is white. A large fold covers the top portion of the tympanum, which is visible. The toe pads are large, the feet are webbed, and the hands are one-third webbed. The only physical feature which can distinguish the Centralian tree frog from the Australian green tree frog is numerous white spots on the dorsal surface.

== Ecology and behaviour ==
The habitat of the Centralian tree frog is rock gorges with water holes, either permanent or temporary. The frog will hide during the day beneath rocks, and hunt and mate during the cooler night. Its call is a slow barking call, similar to the Australian green tree frog.

It inhabits the MacDonnell Ranges in central Australia. This confined distribution is not inhabited by the Australian green tree frog, which allows easy identification.
