= Thomas Barrett (convict) =

First person executed in colony of New South Wales

- Born: c. 1758; London
- Died: 27 February 1788 (aged 29–30); Colony of New South Wales
- Cause of death: Execution by hanging
- Known for: Creator of the Charlotte Medal; First person executed in New South Wales
- Convictions: Theft; Being criminally at large in England
- Penalty: Transportation; Hanging

Thomas Barrett (c. 1758 – 27 February 1788) was a convict transported on the First Fleet to the colony of New South Wales. He created Australia's first colonial art work, the Charlotte Medal, which depicts the arrival of Charlotte at Botany Bay. He was also the first person to be executed in the new colony.

== Life ==
=== England ===
Barrett was born around 1758 in London.

He was accused and tried on 3 July 1782 in the Old Bailey court for the theft in May of silverware from a house, but acquitted.

=== Transportation to Australia ===
On 11 September 1782 Barrett faced trial again, for the theft in July of several items from a house. He was found guilty, and sentenced to death, but that sentence was commuted to transportation. He spent the next 18 months in a prison ship moored on the River Thames, (Note: Before 1775, Britain had transported convicts to its colonies in North America, but with the outbreak of the American Revolutionary War, transportation to the American colonies was suspended. Instead transportees were held in prison ships, pending the end of the war.) before being transferred to the convict ship Mercury, which sailed for Georgia in March 1784.

A few days into the voyage a group of convicts, including Barrett, mutinied and took control of the ship. Bad weather forced them to return to England, where they abandoned the ship and fled, before being recaptured. Barrett was again sentenced to death, and again he was reprieved; during the mutiny he had intervened to save the life of Mercury's steward, and to prevent the captain's ear being cut off, and so his death sentence was commuted to transportation. Once again he was sent to a prison ship, this time in Plymouth, until 1787 (Note: After the revolution, the newly independent America refused to accept convicts from Britain.) when he was included in the first group of convicts to be sent to Britain's new penal colony in New South Wales.

The First Fleet left England in May 1787, with Barrett aboard the convict transport ship Charlotte. En route, the fleet stopped at Rio de Janeiro, where Barrett was caught buying food from local boatmen with forged coins, which he had made from belt buckles, buttons and spoons. According to the ship's surgeon John White, the workmanship was of high quality and the forgery was only detected because of the poor quality of the metal.

Charlotte arrived at Botany Bay on 20 January 1788, but the convicts remained onboard until the fleet sailed to Port Jackson six days later. It was during this time that Barrett created the Charlotte Medal as a memento of their arrival, at the request of White, from a silver kidney dish and using tools provided by White. The medal is considered to be the first work of Australian colonial art. He also created a smaller and less elaborate copper version of the medal for White's servant, William Broughton. (Note: The roles of Barrett, White and Broughton in the creation of the medals are generally accepted as mostly likely to be the case, but some of the sources allow for a degree of uncertainty.)

Within a month of disembarking at Port Jackson, Barrett was in trouble with the law again. He and three other convicts were tried and found guilty of the organised theft of rations from the stores. Conditions in the new colony were harsh, food was scarce, and Governor Arthur Phillip had previously warned the convicts that stealing would be punished by death. Barrett and two of his co-conspirators were sentenced to execution; the other two were subsequently reprieved, but Barrett was hanged on 27 February 1788, becoming the first person executed in the new colony. The body was left to hang for an hour, then buried nearby. The area became known as Hangman's Hill; it is in the locality of what is now known as The Rocks. A Royal Australian Historical Society plaque on the corner of Essex and Harrington Streets marks the approximate location.

== In popular culture ==
Barrett was portrayed by Julian Rhind-Tutt in the 2015 TV series Banished.

== See also ==
- List of convicts transported to Australia
- Banished (TV series) - a 7-part 2015 dramatisation
