= Bessie Blount Griffin =

American physical therapist and forensic scientist

- Born: November 24, 1914; Hickory, Virginia, US
- Died: December 30, 2009 (aged 95); Newfield, New Jersey, US
- Education: Panzer College: Community Kennedy Memorial Hospital
- Known for: Assistive devices
- Scientific career
- Fields: Inventor, physical therapist and nurse

Bessie Virginia Griffin, better known as Bessie Blount (November 24, 1914 – December 30, 2009), was an African American writer, nurse, physical therapist, inventor and forensic scientist. Blount was known for her groundbreaking work in assistive technologies and forensic sciences.

== Early life ==
Bessie Blount Griffin was born on November 24, 1914 in the Hickory, Virginia community of Princess Anne County (now known as the city of Chesapeake). Her parents were George Woodard and Mary Elizabeth Griffin.

== Education ==
Blount attended Diggs Chapel—a one-room schoolhouse built by Black members of the local community—in Hickory, Virginia. The school was built after the Civil War to educate former slaves, their children, and Native Americans.

In an interview with The Virginian, Griffin recalled that her school "didn't have textbooks. [They] later got them from the white schools." Students that attended Diggs Chapel learned to read by quoting verses from the Bible. While attending Diggs Chapel, Blount's teacher reprimanded her for writing with her left hand by rapping (striking) her knuckles, a form of discipline used at the time to teach students proper writing etiquette. Blount took this as a challenge to be ambidextrous-noting that if it was wrong to write with her left hand, then it also must be wrong to write with her right hand. Even though her right hand was her dominant writing hand, she maintained the ability to write with her left hand as well. She also taught herself to write without the use of her hands by holding a pencil with her teeth and feet. This skill was useful in her career later on, helping her teach others to operate without one or more limbs.

After the sixth grade, there were no additional educational resources for African American children in her community, forcing Blount to stop her education. The family relocated north to New Jersey, where Blount remained self-taught and obtained her General Educational Diploma (GED). She attended Community Kennedy Memorial Hospital - the only Black-owned hospital in the state - and enrolled in a nursing program, in Newark, New Jersey. After obtaining her Nursing degree, she continued her education at Panzer College of Physical Education and Hygiene in East Orange, New Jersey and became a physical therapist. Physical therapists assess, diagnose and treat physical impairments and disabilities and utilizes various techniques including exercises, manual therapies and electrical stimulation.

== Physical therapist career ==
During her career as a physical therapist, after World War II, many soldiers returned as amputees after being wounded in combat. As a part of Blount's physical therapy exercises, she taught veterans who had lost the ability to use their hands, new ways to perform everyday tasks by substituting the use of their teeth and feet. She would tell them, “You’re not crippled, only crippled in your mind”.

Her ambidexterity and ability to perform tasks with her mouth and feet helped her relate to her patients out of surgery. As she worked each day, Blount observed that one of the biggest challenges for amputees was eating without assistance from other people. A crucial task for many was to relearn the ability to feed themselves. Regaining this skill would restore a degree of independence and increase their self-esteem.

== Inventions - assistive devices ==
While working at the Bronx Hospital in New York, at thirty-seven years old, Blount invented an electric self-feeding apparatus for amputees. She used plastic, boiling water to mold the material, a file, ice pick, hammer, and some dishes to create a prototype of her invention. The device had a tube to transport individual bites of food to the patient's mouth. The patients would bite down on the tube and then the next portion of food would dispense to the mouthpiece from the attached machine. This allowed patients to control how much they would eat without assistance from others. A part of the device was patented in 1948.

The American Veterans Administration (VA) declined Blount's invention, so in 1952 she licensed it freely to the French government. She remarked in an interview with the African-American that her accomplishment showed that "a black woman can invent something for the benefit of humankind". Though more modern, slimmer devices have been invented since 1948, Blount is remembered for pioneering the first electric device for feeding amputees. She devised a neck frame for an injured or ill patient, that holds a bowl or cup close to their face as a "portable receptacle support" and in April 1951, Blount was granted U.S. patent 2,550,554.

During her career, Blount was a physical therapist to Thomas Edison's son, Theodore Miller Edison. Blount and Edison became close friends. During that time she invented a disposable emesis basin. The basin was a kidney-shaped disposable cardboard dish made out of flour, water, and newspaper that was baked until the material was hard. Once again, the U.S. Veterans Affairs (VA) showed no interest in Blount's invention. She sold the rights to her invention to a company in Belgium.

Blount's invention is recognized as one of the earliest electric assistive eating devices, and its design philosophy — allowing patients to control the pace of their own meals — laid groundwork for modern assistive feeding technologies.

== Forensic science career ==
In 1969, Blount embarked on a second career, in law enforcement, pursuing forensic science research for police departments in New Jersey and Virginia. During her previous patient therapy, while demonstrating ambidextrous functions, or writing with teeth or feet, she had begun to see a correlation between physical health and writing characteristics. From her observations, she saw how a person's handwriting reflected their state of health. This discovery inspired her to publish a technical paper on "medical graphology". After the publication of the paper, Blount's career in forensics quickly grew. By the late 1960s she was assisting police departments in Norfolk, Virginia and Vineland, New Jersey, and later joined the Portsmouth, Virginia police department as a chief examiner until 1972, when the state of Virginia centralized its document examination. In 1977, the Metropolitan Police (Scotland Yard) Forensic Science Laboratory invited Blount to join them in London for advanced studies in graphology. At sixty-three years old, she was the first Black woman to be accepted into the advanced studies at the Document Division of Scotland Yard.

On returning, Blount started her own forensic science consulting business and ran it for twenty-years, using her forensic experience to examine documents and slave papers from the pre-civil war. Blount operated that business until the age of 83. Her verification of authenticity was also used on Native American treaties with the United States.

== Media appearances ==
Blount made numerous attempts to interest the VA in her inventions but they declined, despite the devices' evident beneficial impact. To promote the inventions, she appeared on the WCAU Philadelphia television show The Big Idea in 1953. Blount was the first African-American woman to be on the show. No transcript is available, but it is reported she repeated that she had proved "A black woman can invent something for the benefit of humankind."

Blount wrote a featured columns for the African-American newspapers, the N.J. Herald News and the Philadelphia Independent covering everything from Fidel Castro’s visit to Harlem to Lyndon Johnson’s presidential nomination. She joined the NAACP to do public relations work and wrote several medical papers that were published in respected journals covering “medical graphology” and the relationship between a person’s health and their handwriting.

In 2008 she undertook but was unable to complete one more project: founding a museum on the grounds of her old Virginia schoolhouse which had burned down, to commemorate the contributions of those who had studied there.

== Honors and awards ==
Blount was honored in 1992 by The American Academy of Physical Therapy, an African American focused physical therapy organization.

She was honored as one of the Virginia Women in History in 2005.

In 2019, The New York Times published a belated obituary for her, as part of Overlooked No More.

== Personal life ==
In 1951, Blount married Thomas Griffin. They had one son, Philip.

== Death ==
Blount died at age 95 on December 30, 2009 at her home in Newfield, New Jersey.
