= Chocolate Frog =

Chocolate Frog may refer to:

- Ranoidea mira, a tree frog nicknamed the "chocolate frog"
- Chocolate Frog (Harry Potter)
- Chocolate Frog Records, an independent record label formed in 2001 by the singer Fish
- The Chocolate Frog, play
