= Avita =

Avita may refer to:

- Australian Green Tree Frog
- Tretinoin
