= Banished (TV series) =

2015 British television series

- Genre: Historical drama
- Created by: Jimmy McGovern
- Written by: Jimmy McGovern; Shaun Duggan (episode 5)
- Directed by: Daniel Percival (episodes 1-3); Jeffrey Walker (episodes 4-7)
- Composer: David Hirschfelder
- Countries of origin: United Kingdom; Australia
- Original language: English
- No. of series: 1
- No. of episodes: 7

Production
- Executive producers: Sita Williams; Roxy Spencer; Jimmy McGovern; Emile Sherman; Iain Canning; Jamie Laurenson; Polly Hill
- Producers: Sita Williams; Brett Popplewell; Simon Hailey
- Production location: Sydney
- Cinematography: Steve Lawes
- Running time: 58-60 minutes
- Production companies: RSJ Films; See-Saw Films

Original release
- Network: BBC First; BBC Two; BBC Two HD; BBC UKTV
- Release: 5 March – 16 April 2015

Banished is a British drama television serial created by Jimmy McGovern. The seven-part serial first aired on 5 March 2015 on BBC Two and was inspired by events in the eighteenth century when Britain established a penal colony in Australia.

Banished was not renewed for a second series.

== Plot ==
Set in the first penal colony founded by the British in New South Wales in the year 1788, in which the British convicts live alongside their Royal Navy marine guards and their officers. A thousand prisoners are guarded by one hundred men, and with five men for every woman, tensions are high from widespread polyamory and rape. Several characters from the real First Fleet are portrayed, though not necessarily accurately.

== Production ==
The series, a co-production between RSJ Films and See-Saw Films, was co-commissioned by BBC Two and BBC Worldwide. The commissioners for BBC Two are Ben Stephenson and Janice Hadlow. Filming took place in Sydney in April 2014 and Manchester afterwards. The series premiered on 25 June 2015, on BBC First in Australia and BBC UKTV in New Zealand.

== Cast ==
In alphabetical order:

- Orla Brady as Anne Meredith
- Ewen Bremner as Reverend Johnson
- MyAnna Buring as Elizabeth Quinn
- Ryan Corr as Corporal MacDonald
- David Dawson as Captain David Collins
- Ned Dennehy as Letters Molloy
- Brooke Harman as Deborah, Governor Phillip's housekeeper
- Cal MacAninch as Sergeant Timmins
- Rory McCann as Marston, the blacksmith
- Joseph Millson as Major Robert Ross
- Nick Moss as Spragg
- Adam Nagaitis as Private Buckley
- Genevieve O'Reilly as Reverend Johnson's wife
- Jordan Patrick Smith as Private Mulroney
- Russell Tovey as James Freeman
- Julian Rhind-Tutt as Tommy Barrett
- Joanna Vanderham as Katherine 'Kitty' McVitie
- David Walmsley as William Stubbins
- David Wenham as Captain Arthur Phillip, 1st Governor of New South Wales

== Episodes (2015) ==
No.	Title	Directed by	Written by	Original release date	UK viewers (millions)
1	"Episode 1"	Daniel Percival	Jimmy McGovern	5 March 2015	4.43
When prisoner Elizabeth Quinn is found in the men's quarters, the rules of the penal colony are tested. The female prisoners are expected to fraternize only with the soldiers and not other prisoners unless they are married; an impossible situation because she and her lover, Tommy Barrett, have spouses back in England. Governor Phillip, to maintain order, agrees to have Barrett hanged and gives the task to Reverend Johnson who will not marry them as he does not sanction the Governor's legal power to divorce the pair.
2	"Episode 2"	Daniel Percival	Jimmy McGovern	12 March 2015	3.29
Starving James Freeman plots with Tommy Barrett and Elizabeth Quinn to kill the blacksmith who has been stealing all his food. The plot goes awry, forcing Barrett to kill the blacksmith in the sleeping quarters before witnesses. The witnesses agree to stay silent. With the body disposed of the Governor cannot hang anybody even though he suspects Freeman. Kitty McVitie, a prisoner who has a protector and lover in Private MacDonald, catches the eye of Major Ross and he offers the Private promotion to Corporal and extra food in exchange for sex with McVitie for two nights a week; with no alternative they agree, but the intervention of the Reverend Johnson meant that the relationship must be platonic.
3	"Episode 3"	Daniel Percival	Jimmy McGovern	19 March 2015	3.23
Stubbins volunteers to be the new blacksmith to gain remission on his sentence and is being taught to read and write to the consternation of the colony letter writer Letters Molloy. Elizabeth and Barrett's blessing of marriage by the Reverend Johnson at the site of his proposed church is halted by her sickness caused by her pregnancy. The Governor also calls a halt to the building of the church. Major Ross's demands on Kitty McVitie that she should spend three nights a week with him prove too much and in her desire to kill herself the blacksmith's body is discovered; James Freeman flees into the bush.
4	"Episode 4"	Jeffrey Walker	Jimmy McGovern	26 March 2015	3.20
McVitie is threatened with a hundred lashes by Major Ross, who takes her suicide attempt as an insult; but intervention by the Reverend Johnson leads to a compromise satisfactory to Ross's desires and the restart of the church construction. Mrs Johnson is given hope for the future by the insight of Anne Meredith. Freeman returns to the colony after a run-in with an escaped prisoner who was thought to be dead, Jefferson. Freeman is sentenced to be hanged and the Governor unsuccessfully canvasses the prisoners for a hangman; finding no volunteer, the Governor has to do it himself, and with Freeman in the noose on the scaffold, offers him a way out.
5	"Episode 5"	Jeffrey Walker	Jimmy McGovern and Shaun Duggan	2 April 2015	2.74
The prisoners' suspicions are aroused by Freeman's escape from the hangman's noose, believing he has turned informer; punishable by death at the hands of the prisoners. Major Ross's batman, Mulrooney, is killed by a poisonous snake and Ross uses the death to try to drive a wedge between Kitty McVitie and Corporal MacDonald. A poker game between Timmins, Macdonald, Buckley, Freeman, and Barrett turns nasty when Barrett uses his wife, Elizabeth, as a stake and a truth is revealed about Buckley and Elizabeth.
6	"Episode 6"	Jeffrey Walker	Jimmy McGovern	9 April 2015	2.72
Barrett goes berserk and finds Buckley and beats him to near death, placing the governor Phillip in a dilemma with Major Ross demanding Barrett be hanged and the Reverend Johnson pleading leniency. With food supplies dwindling, Ross proposes withdrawing food from the dying and feeding the corpses to the prisoners so that his soldiers can remain fed. Ross convinces Sergeant Timmins that in the event that the Governor should not sentence Barrett to death, then Timmins should arrest the governor. The governor decides to sentence Barrett to death and allows Barrett and his companions to get drunk. Ross's plan to break up McVitie and MacDonald come to fruition when she agrees to having sex with him. Freeman, knowing he will be the hangman and will be killed by the other prisoners, goes to the scaffold and puts the noose around his own neck.
7	"Episode 7"	Jeffrey Walker	Jimmy McGovern	16 April 2015	2.89
Kitty McVitie agrees to live with Major Ross despite MacDonald imploring her to marry him. Mrs Johnson enquires if she can take Anne Meredith home to England when she and her husband return, but the truth behind her transportation threatens their friendship. At the hanging of Tommy Barrett, the convicts' plan to turn their backs is thwarted by Major Ross's intervention using MacDonald to kill any prisoner refusing to watch. The governor orders Freeman to do his duty and orders Private Buckley to act as Freeman's bodyguard on pain of his own death. Governor Phillip uses the defiance of the convicts to cut the dwindling rations.

== Reception ==
The drama series premiered on 5 March 2015 and gained 3.4 million viewers, giving BBC2 a rare ratings victory over both BBC1 and ITV. It was BBC2’s second biggest new drama launch for several years, behind Wolf Hall, which began in January with an overnight audience of 3.9 million.

The Guardian newspaper named the series "I'm a Convict, Get me Out of Here!" with reference to the reality TV series I'm a Celebrity...Get Me Out of Here!. The Telegraph gave the TV series two stars out of five because of its misrepresentation of the British military with "stereotypical tropes", its lack or historical accuracy and its "grim" nature, comparing it to the TV series Lost.

McGovern, responding to criticisms over the lack of Indigenous Australians on the series, said that "The time-frame in Banished is very short – something just over two weeks – and there is not sufficient time to develop and do justice to indigenous characters" (This however is not in line with the storyline that has numerous references to the many weeks past).
