= Charlotte (1784 ship) =

First Fleet transport ship

History

Great Britain
- Name: Charlotte
- Namesake: Charlotte of Mecklenburg-Strelitz
- Owner: 1784: Mathews & Co.; 1789: Bond &Co.
- Port of registry: London
- Builder: Thames
- Launched: 1784
- Fate: Possibly sunk November 1818; disappears from lists in 1821

General characteristics
- Tons burthen: 335, or 338, or 34553/94, or 350, or 384 bm
- Length: 105 ft (32 m)
- Beam: 28 ft 3 in (8.61 m)
- Sail plan: Full-rigged ship
- Crew: 30
- Armament: 8 × 18-pounder carronades
- Notes: Barque-built (1786)

Charlotte was an English merchant ship built on the River Thames in 1784, and chartered in 1786, to carry convicts as part of the First Fleet to New South Wales. She returned to Britain from Botany Bay via China, where she picked up a cargo for the British East India Company. Charlotte then spent much of the rest of her career as a West Indiaman in the London-Jamaica trade. She may have been lost off Newfoundland in 1818; in any case, she disappeared from the lists by 1821. Charlotte made an appearance in the movie National Treasure.

== Service history ==
=== Initial career ===
Charlotte first appeared in Lloyd's Register (LR) in 1784. Prior to her voyage transporting convicts, Charlotte traded with the Baltic and the West Indies.

Year	Master	Owner	Trade	Source
1784	Sanderson	Matthews	London–Petersburg	LR
1786	J.Sanderson	Matthews	London–Antigua	LR
1787	J.Sanderson; Tho. Gilbert	Matthews	London–Stettin; London–Botany Bay	LR
1789	T.Gilbert	Matthews	London–Botany Bay	LR

=== Convict transport ===
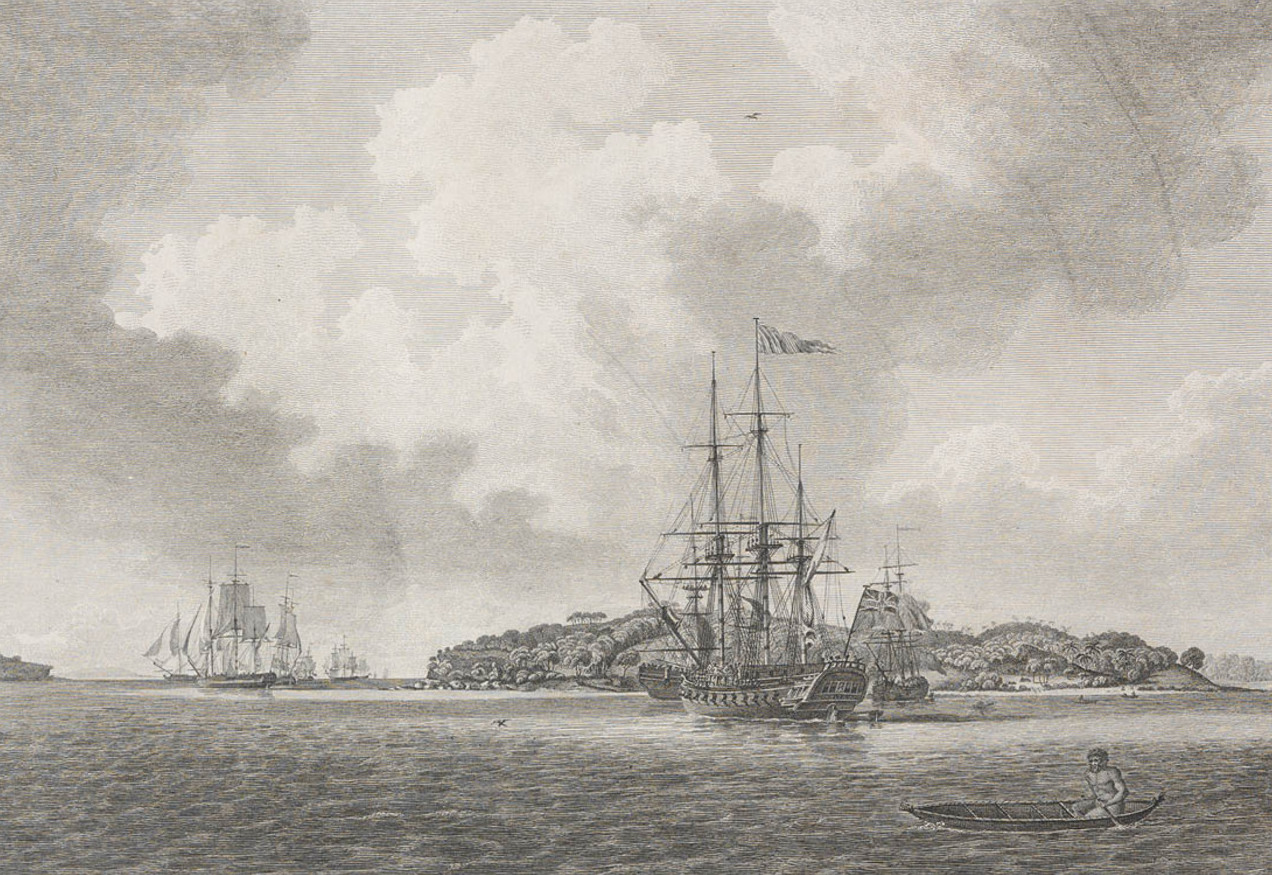
An engraving of the First Fleet in Botany Bay at voyage's end in 1788, from The Voyage of Governor Phillip to Botany Bay.

Charlotte was a "heavy sailer"; she had to be towed down the English Channel to keep pace with the rest of the Fleet. Her master was Thomas Gilbert, and her surgeon was John White, principal surgeon to the colony. On 15 March, when Charlotte had been two days at sea it was discovered that her third mate had been left behind at Plymouth; he was replaced for the remainder of the voyage by a seaman hastily dragooned from the accompanying naval vessel Hyaena.

She sailed for Botany Bay carrying 84 male and 24 female convicts, or 89 male and 20 female. Among the prisoners were James Squire, James Bloodsworth, James Underwood, Samuel Lightfoot, William Bryant and Mary Bryant, She also carried 42 men from the New South Wales Marine Corps to guard the convicts.

Charlotte arrived at Port Jackson, Sydney, Australia, on 26 January 1788. This voyage was commemorated on the Charlotte Medal, commissioned by White and created by the convict Thomas Barrett.

One female convict, thought to be Ellen Fraser 1764-1840 (nee Redchester), was transferred from "Prince of Wales" to " Charlotte" on 13 August 1787, during the stop in Rio, where she joined her husband William Fraser who was a convict on the " Charlotte". Ellen gave birth to the second child of British parents in the colony (John Fraser).

She left Port Jackson on 6 May 1788, bound for China to take on a cargo of tea, under charter to the East India Company.

In May 1788, Captain Gilbert in Charlotte and Captain John Marshall in Scarborough, left Port Jackson together intending to find a new route to China. After sighting Lord Howe Island and Norfolk Island they discovered, on 27 May 1788, Matthew Island, and then, on 24 June, they saw land in the southern sector of the Marshall Islands. They continued on via Abemama, Kuria, Aranuka, Tarawa, Abaiang, Butaritari, and Makin without attempting to land on shore. They reached Canton on 9 September 1788, 126 days from Port Jackson. The two large dispersed groups of islands they discovered in the Central Pacific have since been known as the Gilbert and Marshall Islands.

=== Later career ===
On her return to England on 28 November 1789, Bond and Co., Walbrook merchants, purchased Charlotte to use her in the London—Jamaica trade. The following data is from Lloyd's Register.

Year	Master	Owner	Trade
1790	T. Gilbert; B. Howes	Matthews; Bond & Co.	London–Botany Bay; London–Jamaica
1795	Kent	Bond & Co.	London–Jamaica
1800	D. Kent	Rutherford	London–Jamaica
1805	D. Kent	Rutherford	London–Jamaica

Charlotte was one of the transport vessels that were part of the expedition under General Sir David Baird and Admiral Sir Home Riggs Popham that would in 1806, capture the Dutch Cape Colony.

On 11 March, she and Anacreon sailed as cartels to France with prisoners from Volontaire.

Year	Master	Owner	Trade	Source & notes
1807	R.Allison	Fletcher	London transport	LR; repairs 1804
1810	R.Allison	Fletcher	London transport	LR; repairs 1804, & good repair 1804
1819	R. Allison	Fletcher	London transport	LR; good repair 1810

At some point she may have been sold to a Quebec merchant; if so, this does not appear in LR or the Register of Shipping.

== Fate ==
A Charlotte was lost off Newfoundland in November 1818. However, there is no evidence to link the Charlotte that sank while sailing from Quebec to Liverpool with M'Call, master, to the Charlotte of this article. Another source notes that Charlotte continued to be listed in Lloyd's Register until 1821, but it is not unusual for Lloyd's Register to carry stale data for several years.

== Recognition ==
An Urban Transit Authority First Fleet ferry was named after Charlotte in 1986.

== See also ==
- Journals of the First Fleet
- List of convicts on the First Fleet
- National Treasure (film)
