= John White (surgeon) =

English surgeon and botanical collector (1756–1832)

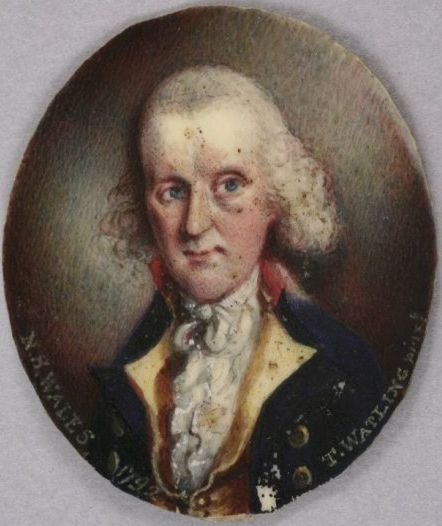
- Born: c.1756 Drumaran, Belcoo, County Fermanagh
- Died: 20 February 1832; Worthing
- Citizenship: Kingdom of Ireland and, later, British
- Scientific career
- Fields: surgeon, zoologist, botanist
- Workplaces: Royal Navy
- Author abbrev. (botany): J. White
- Author abbrev. (zoology): White

John White (c. 1756 – 20 February 1832) was an Irish surgeon and botanical collector.

== Biography ==
White was born in the townland of Drumaran, near Belcoo, in County Fermanagh in Ulster, the northern province in Ireland, about 1756, and not, as stated in the Dictionary of Australian Biography and the Australian Dictionary of Biography, in Sussex, England. On 18 June 1778 John White qualified as a surgeon's mate, first rate, following examination at the Company of Surgeons in London. He entered the Royal Navy on 26 June 1778 as surgeon's mate aboard HMS Wasp. He was promoted surgeon in 1780, serving aboard HMS Irresistible until 1786 when Sir Andrew Hamond recommended him as principal naval surgeon for the voyage of the First Fleet to Australia.

In March 1787 White joined the First Fleet at Plymouth as surgeon for the convict transport Charlotte. On arrival in Australia, White engaged one of the convicts, Thomas Barrett, to engrave a silver medallion to mark the occasion. The medallion, or "Charlotte Medal", is displayed in Australia's National Maritime Museum.

In 1788 White was appointed Surgeon-General of New South Wales and organised a hospital for the new colony, somewhat hampered by a lack of medical supplies. He became interested in the native flora and fauna of the new land and investigated the potential of Australian plants for use as medicine. He observed the olfactory qualities of eucalyptus and distilled eucalyptus oil in 1788.

White wrote A Journal of a Voyage to New South Wales (1790), which described many Australian species for the first time. Journal had 65 copper-plate engravings of birds, animals and plants, many of which were based on the water colour paintings of Sarah Stone. It was soon translated into German and French. It is believed (by his unnamed biographer) that Thomas William Parr was employed as a sketch artist by White to produce natural history drawings as a starting point for development and colouring by other artists. White was the first to describe Litoria caerulea, a species of frog endemic to Australia and New Guinea, which has several common names, including "White's tree frog". In 1792, Thomas Watling, a convict artist newly arrived to the colony, was appointed by the government to assist John White in the production of copies of illustrations of various plants, insects and animals. A portrait of John White, a miniature on ivory, signed by Thomas Watling and dated "N.S.Wales 1792", is in the National Museum of Australia.

According to his journal, White severely disliked Australia, describing it as: "a country and place so forbidding and so hateful as only to merit execration and curses." He applied for leave of absence in 1792, and received it in 1794, sailing for England on 17 December 1794 and later travelled to Ireland. In 1796 he resigned his position when given the option of returning to Australia. Earlier in 1796, White was elected a Fellow of the Linnean Society of London, and on 10 March 1797, the Senate of the University of St Andrews conferred the degree of Doctor of Medicine on him. White was a surgeon on HMS Royal William, stationed first at Sheerness from 1799 and then at Chatham Dockyard from 1803. He retired on a half pension in 1820, and died in Worthing, England, in 1832.

== Legacy ==
Sydney's White Bay is named in his honour.

John White is commemorated in the scientific name of a species of Australian lizard, Egernia whitii.

== See also ==
- History of public health in Australia
