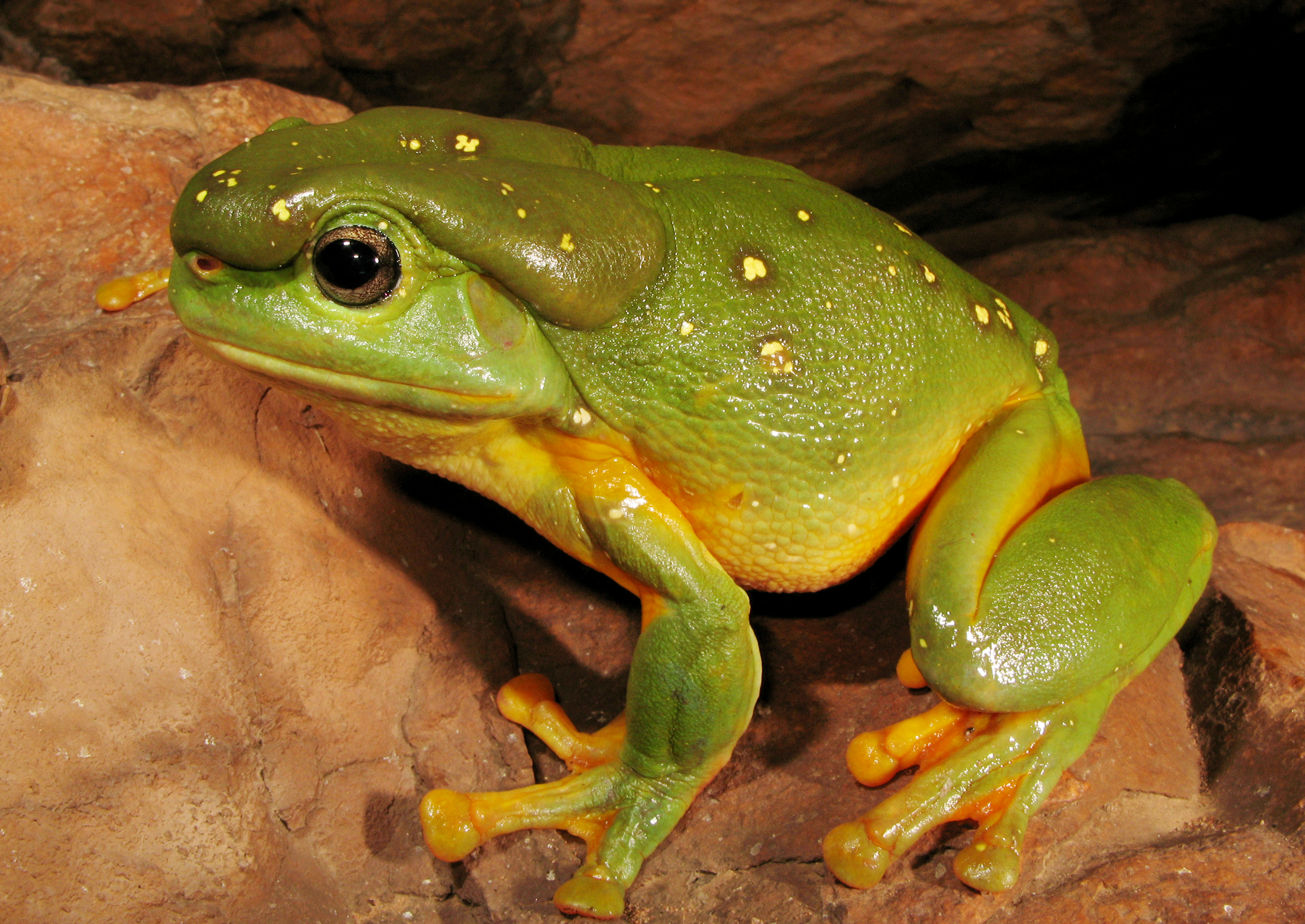
- Magnificent tree frog in the Kimberleys, Australia

Scientific classification
- Kingdom: Animalia
- Phylum: Chordata
- Class: Amphibia
- Order: Anura
- Family: Pelodryadidae
- Genus: Pelodryas; Günther, 1859

Species
- Pelodryas caerulea (White, 1790); Pelodryas cavernicola (Tyler and Davies, 1979); Pelodryas gilleni (Spencer, 1896); Pelodryas mira (Oliver et al., 2021); Pelodryas splendida (Oliver et al., 2021)

= Pelodryas =

Genus of amphibians

Pelodryas is a genus of large tree frogs in the family Pelodryadidae. These frogs are native to most of Australia, New Guinea and many surrounding islands. Species in the genus were previously included within the wastebasket genus Litoria, but were separated into a new genus in 2025. They are large arboreal or rock-dwelling frogs characterised by a bright green colour, though individuals can turn brown and the lesser-known chocolate tree frog is always a shade of brown.

The genus is thought to be named from the Greek peloros, meaning "huge or immense", and dryas meaning "a spirit of the woods".

The genus consists of five species:

- Chocolate tree frog (Pelodryas mira; Oliver, Rittmeyer, Torkkola, Donnellan, Dahl & Richards, 2021)
- Cave-dwelling frog (Pelodryas cavernicola; Tyler & Davies, 1979)
- Australian green tree frog (Pelodryas caerulea; White, 1790)
- Centralian tree frog (Pelodryas gilleni; Spencer, 1896)
- Magnificent tree frog (Pelodryas splendida; Tyler, Davies & Martin, 1977)
