= Hickory, Virginia =

Hickory
- Unincorporated community
- Location within the state of Virginia Hickory (the United States)
- Coordinates: 36°37′56″N 76°12′29″W
- Country: United States
- State: Virginia
- Independent city: Chesapeake
- Time zone: UTC−5 (Eastern (EST))
  - Summer (DST): UTC−4 (EDT)

Hickory is a small rural unincorporated community located within the independent city of Chesapeake in the U.S. state of Virginia. Hickory lies in the southern portion of the city and is adjacent to the North Carolina-Virginia border. Hickory began as a rural area largely surrounded by farmland, but development of the city has resulted in the building of suburban neighborhoods in the community.

Hickory High School is where New York Mets star David Wright matriculated from. Its school colors are teal, gray, black, and white. Its school mascot is a hawk. The school once made news when students held a "Confederacy Day" parade on the front lawn. However, it continues to rank at the top of Virginia schools for test scores and overall academic quality and rigor.
