= Chocolate tree frog =

Scientific classification
- Kingdom: Animalia
- Phylum: Chordata
- Class: Amphibia
- Order: Anura
- Family: Pelodryadidae
- Genus: Pelodryas
- Species: P. mira

Binomial name
- Pelodryas mira Oliver, Rittmeyer, Torkkola, Donnellan, Dahl & Richards, 2021 "2020"

Frog endemic to New Guinea

The chocolate tree frog (Pelodryas mira) is a species of arboreal frog in the family Pelodryadidae.

It was discovered in New Guinea in 2021 by a research team led by Griffith University.

== Taxonomy and systematics ==
It is likely that both the chocolate frog and the Australian green tree frog were derived from a common ancestor when Australia and New Guinea were linked by land about 2.6 million years ago. It was named mira (meaning surprised or strange in Latin) because of the surprising nature of the discovery, and its chocolate-brown skin.

== Description ==
Ranoidea mira bears a close resemblance with the Australian green tree frog. They both look similar apart from their skin color. Ranoidea mira has a combination of webbing on hand, large size, limbs that are relatively short and robust as well as small violet patch of skin present on the edges of its eyes. It is a little smaller than the Australian green tree frog, at between 7 cm and 8 cm when fully mature.

== Distribution and habitat ==
The chocolate tree frog is endemic to New Guinea.
