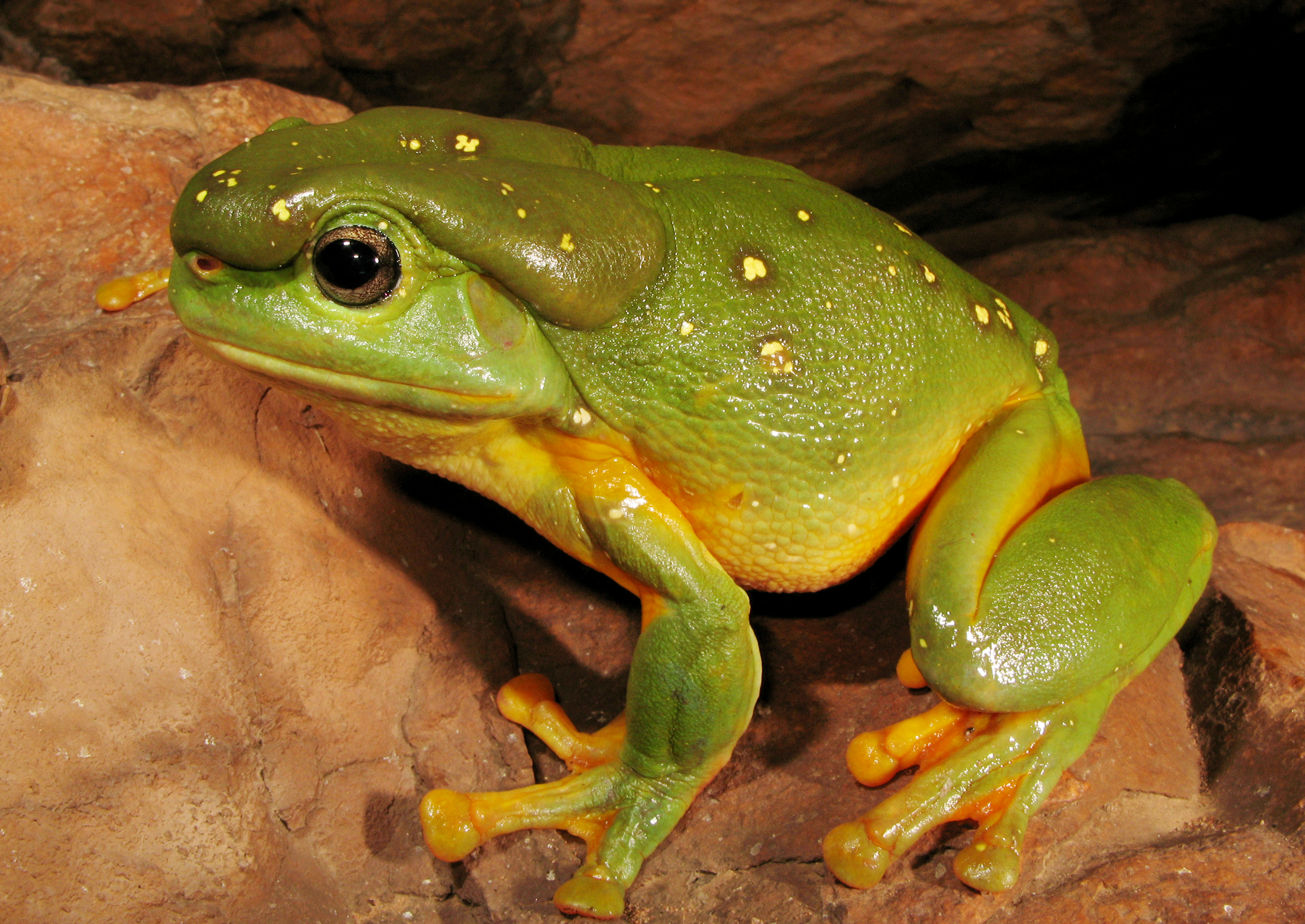

Conservation status
- Least Concern (IUCN 3.1)

Scientific classification
- Kingdom: Animalia
- Phylum: Chordata
- Class: Amphibia
- Order: Anura
- Family: Pelodryadidae
- Genus: Pelodryas
- Species: P. splendida

Binomial name
- Pelodryas splendida (Michael J. Tyler, Davies & Martin, 1977)
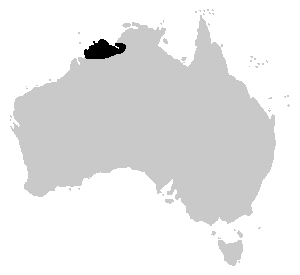
- Distribution of the magnificent tree frog

Synonyms
- Litora splendida Tyler, Davies & Martin, 1977; Ranoidea splendida

= Magnificent tree frog =

Species of amphibian

The magnificent tree frog (Pelodryas splendida), also known as the splendid tree frog, is a species of tree frog first described in 1977. It has a limited range, only occurring on the north-western coast of Australia in the Northern Territory and the Kimberley, Western Australia. It has a similar appearance to, and can be confused with, the closely related White's tree frog.

== Description ==
The magnificent tree frog is a relatively large tree frog, with the males reaching a length (SVL) of 10.4 cm (4.1 in) and the females 10.6 cm (4.2 in). They have olive to bright green dorsal surfaces with white ventral surfaces. The undersides of the feet and legs are bright yellow. Most specimens have white or sulphur-coloured dots on their backs, of varying densities. The older magnificent tree frogs can be distinguished from White's tree frogs by the presence of very large parotoid glands, which cover the entire top of their heads and droop over their tympana. The tympanum is large, almost the size of the eye, and partially obscured by the parotoid gland.

In July 2024, the first picture of a blue magnificent tree frog was published. It was spotted by chance in the Charnley River-Artesian Range Wildlife Sanctuary and captured for further study. The blue skin is caused by a mutation called axanthism which affects the yellow pigmentation leaving only the blue.

== Ecology and behaviour ==
Magnificent tree frogs are native to the Kimberley region of Western Australia. They are nocturnal and enter caves and rock crevices during the day. Much like the other large tree frogs in Australia, White's tree frog and the giant tree frog, they inhabit areas near humans, and can be found around buildings and in toilets, showers, and water tanks. They are nocturnal, and will hunt and breed at night.

Breeding probably takes place during the wet season. The male's call is very similar to that of White's tree frog, a deep "crawk-crawk-crawk" repeated many times. The breeding habits of the magnificent tree frog have not been extensively studied.

== As a pet ==
It is kept as a pet; in Australia, this animal may be kept in captivity with the appropriate permit.

== Gallery ==
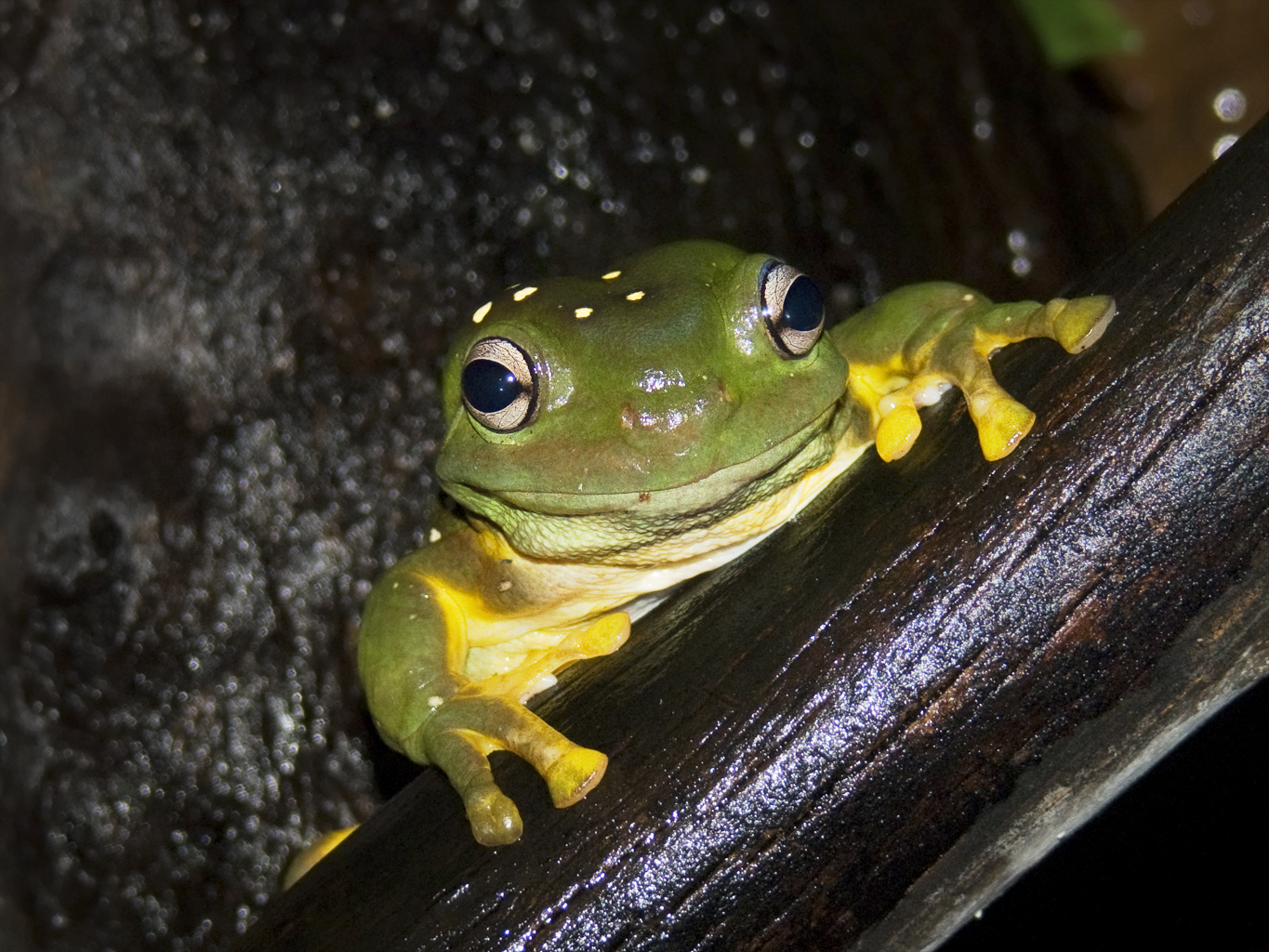
Magnificent tree frog

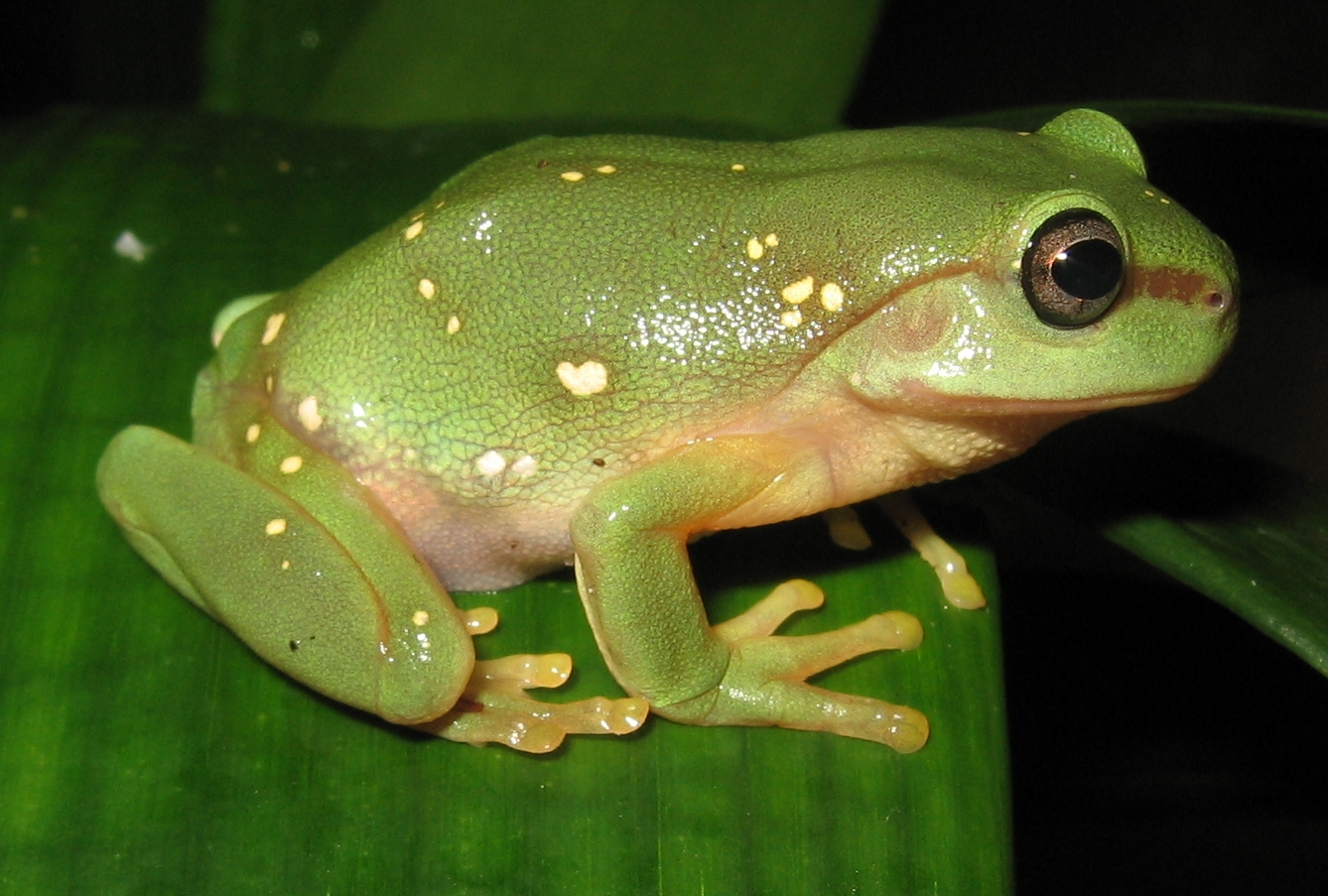
A juvenile before the development of large parotoid glands

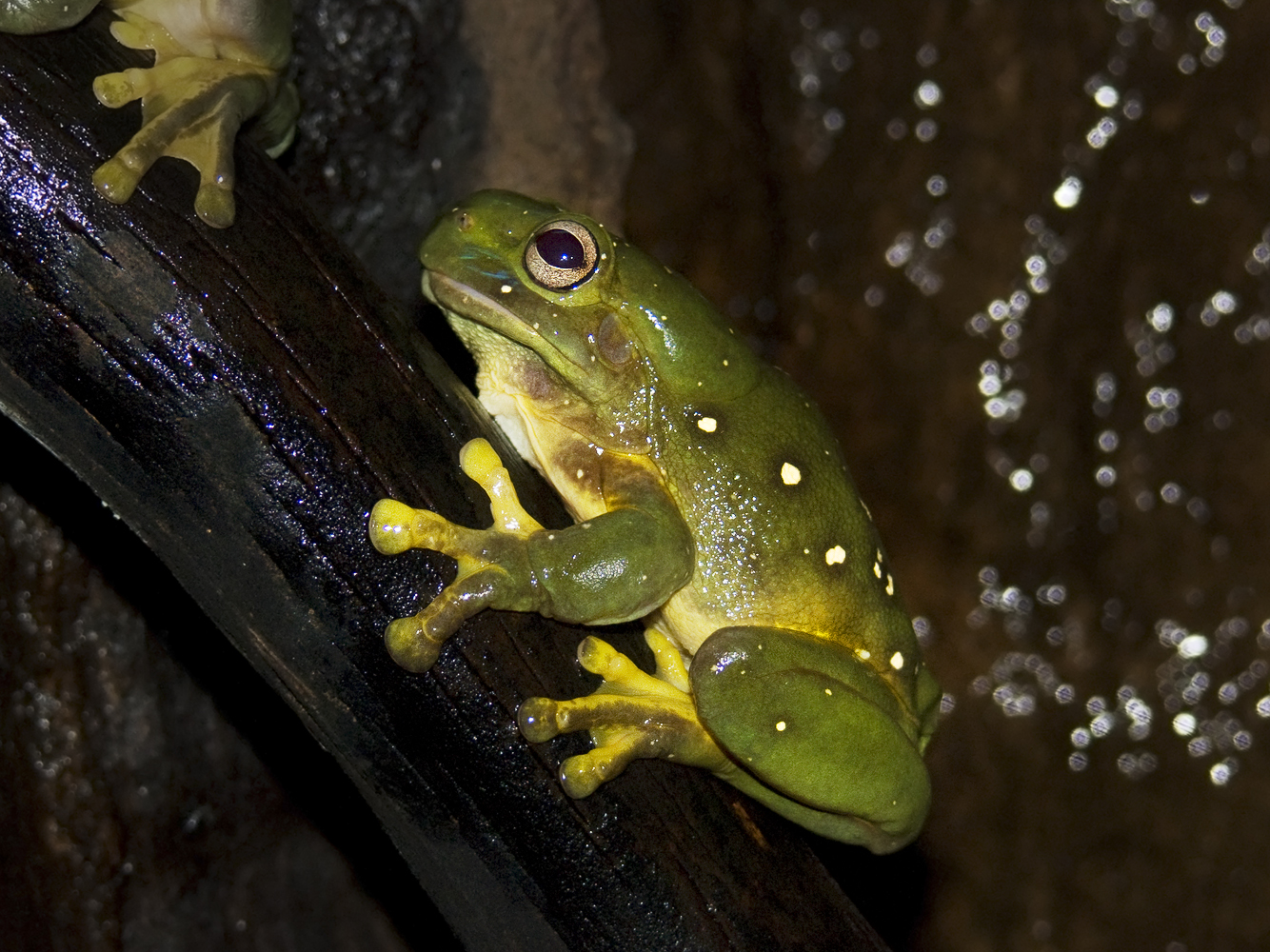

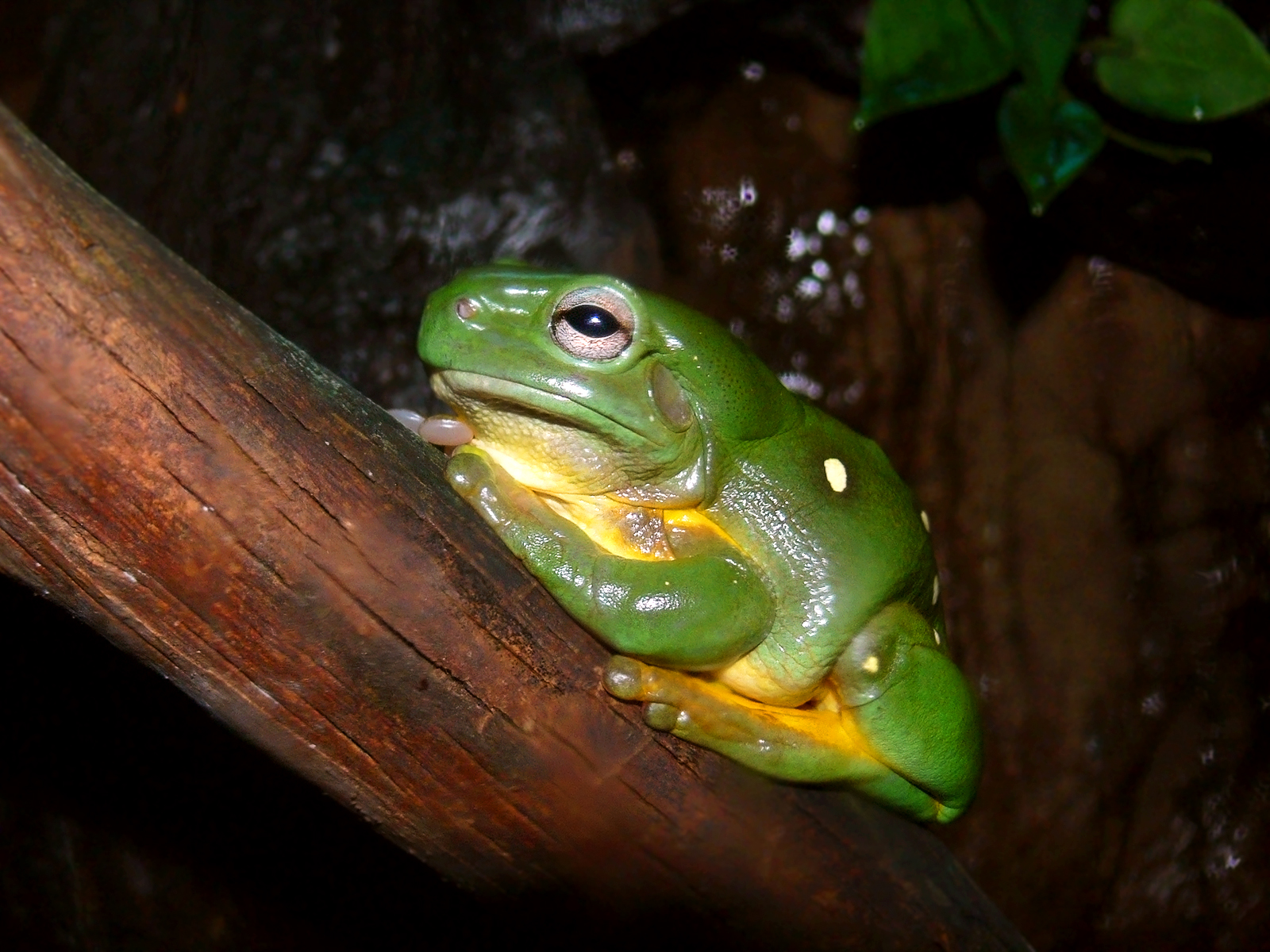

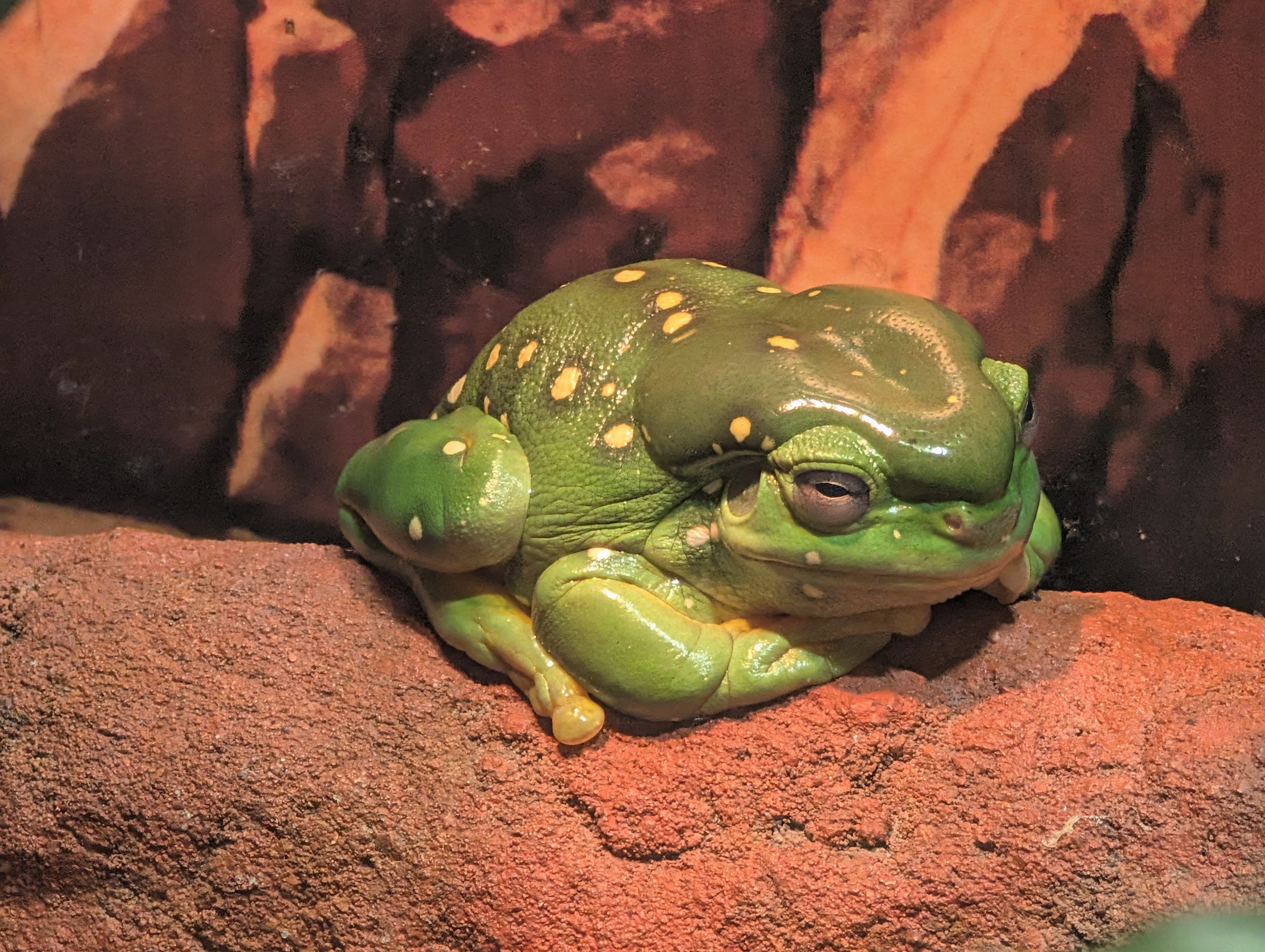
Magnificent tree frog (Ranoidea splendida), Melbourne ZOO, Australia
