= Kidney dish =

Container used in medicine

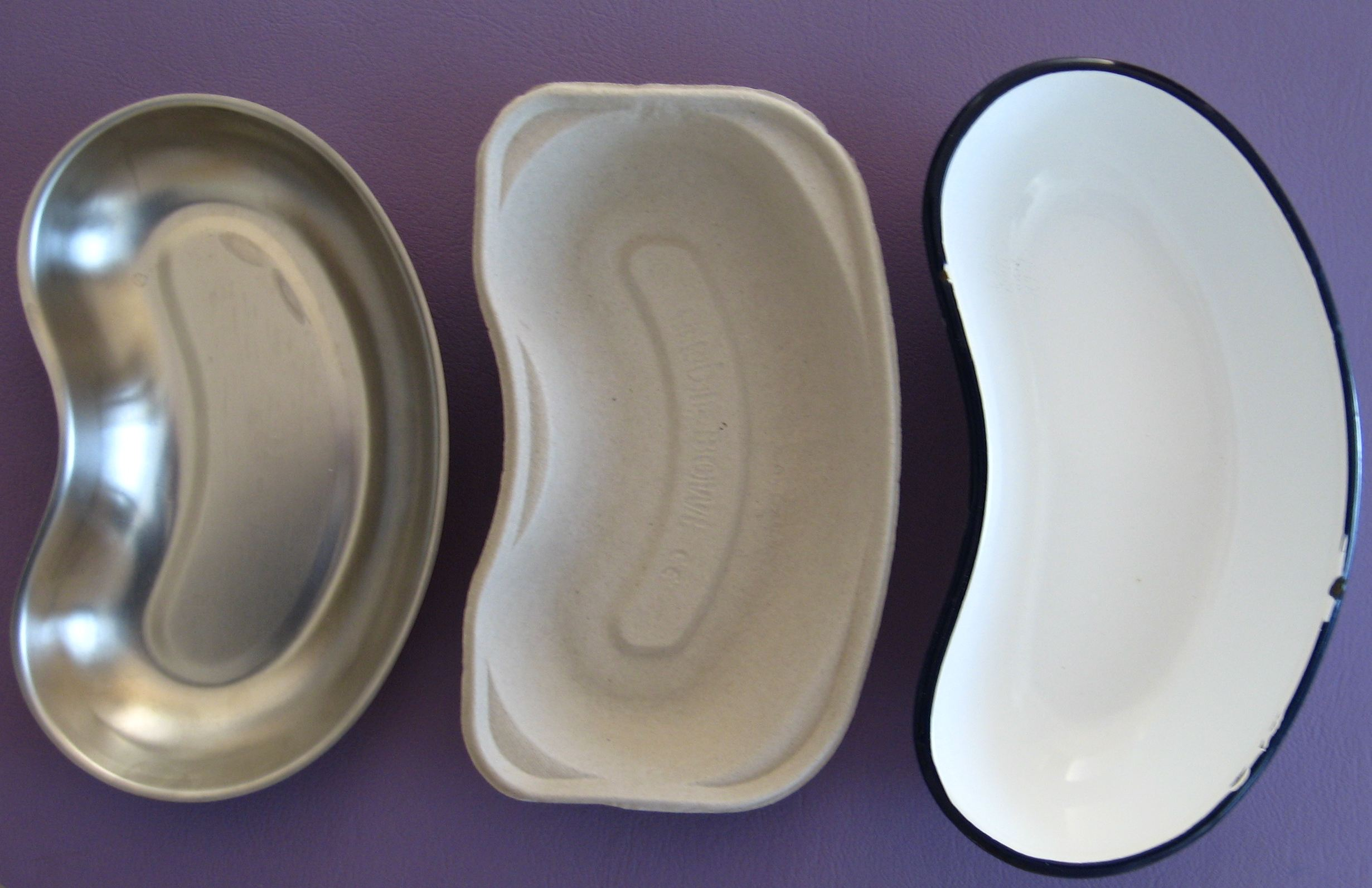
Kidney dishes made from stainless steel, cardboard and enamelled iron

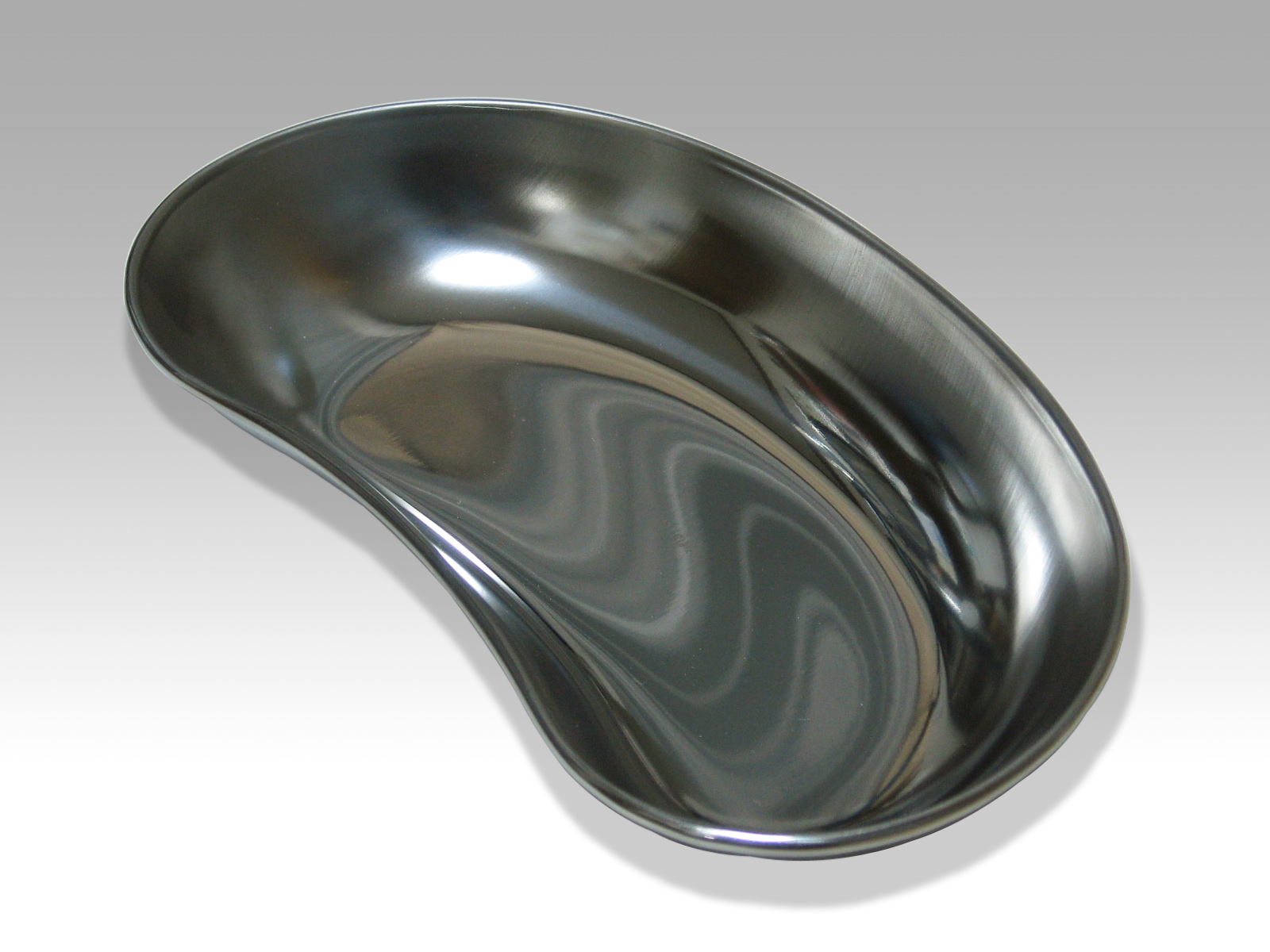
Stainless-steel kidney dish

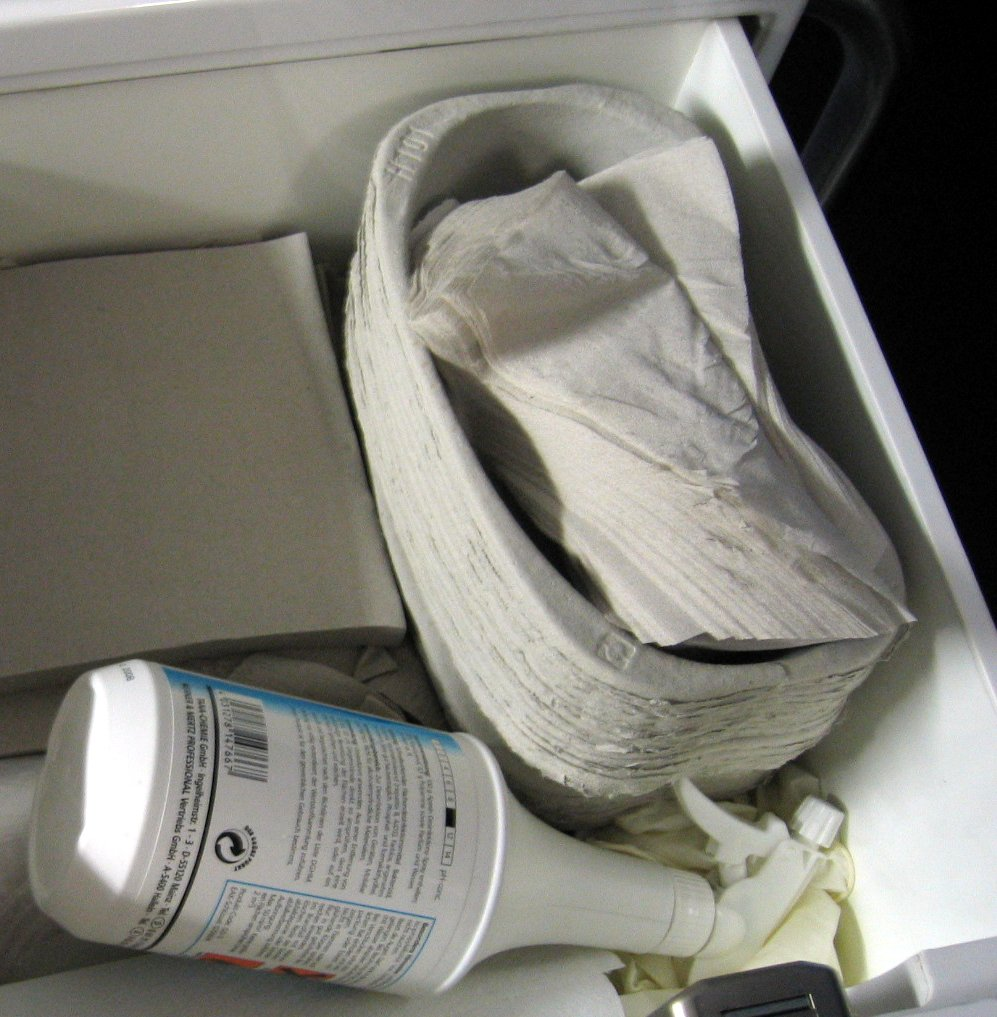
Stack of disposable pulp kidney dishes, stored in a drawer

A kidney dish (British English) or emesis basin (American English) is a shallow basin with a kidney-shaped base and sloping walls used in medical and surgical wards to receive soiled dressings and other medical waste. Generally, the volume of a pulp kidney dish (or "vomit dish") is 700 mL. Its length is 25 cm-26 cm, its width 11 cm. The shape of the dish allows it to be held against the patient's body to catch any falling fluids or debris. Various sizes of emesis basins are common in healthcare settings, including facilities such as nursing homes that may have bedridden patients.

== Design ==
Reusable kidney dishes are usually made of stainless steel. During the first half of the 20th century, kidney dishes were commonly made of enamelled iron.

Bessie Blount invented a disposable kidney dish. It was a kidney-shaped disposable cardboard dish made out of flour, water, and newspaper that was baked until the material was hard.

Disposable molded pulp kidney dishes have been replacing reusable kidney dishes because single-use products can decrease cross-communication of pathogens. Each year, more than 100 million pulp kidney dishes are used in hospital or family care.

== Uses ==
Contrary to its name, emesis basins are not usually used for vomiting, as the depth, size, and sloping walls all contribute to spilling or splashing the vomit rather than catching it. For this purpose, a plastic bag or wash basin is often preferred, especially by ambulance crews who may need to receive the vomit while driving rapidly, and then hand it over for analysis.

Emesis basins are suited for more controlled situations. When washing out a small wound, for example, sometimes the wash water is applied from above with an emesis basin held underneath to catch the runoff. The concave inner rim helps to conform to the curve of the body.
