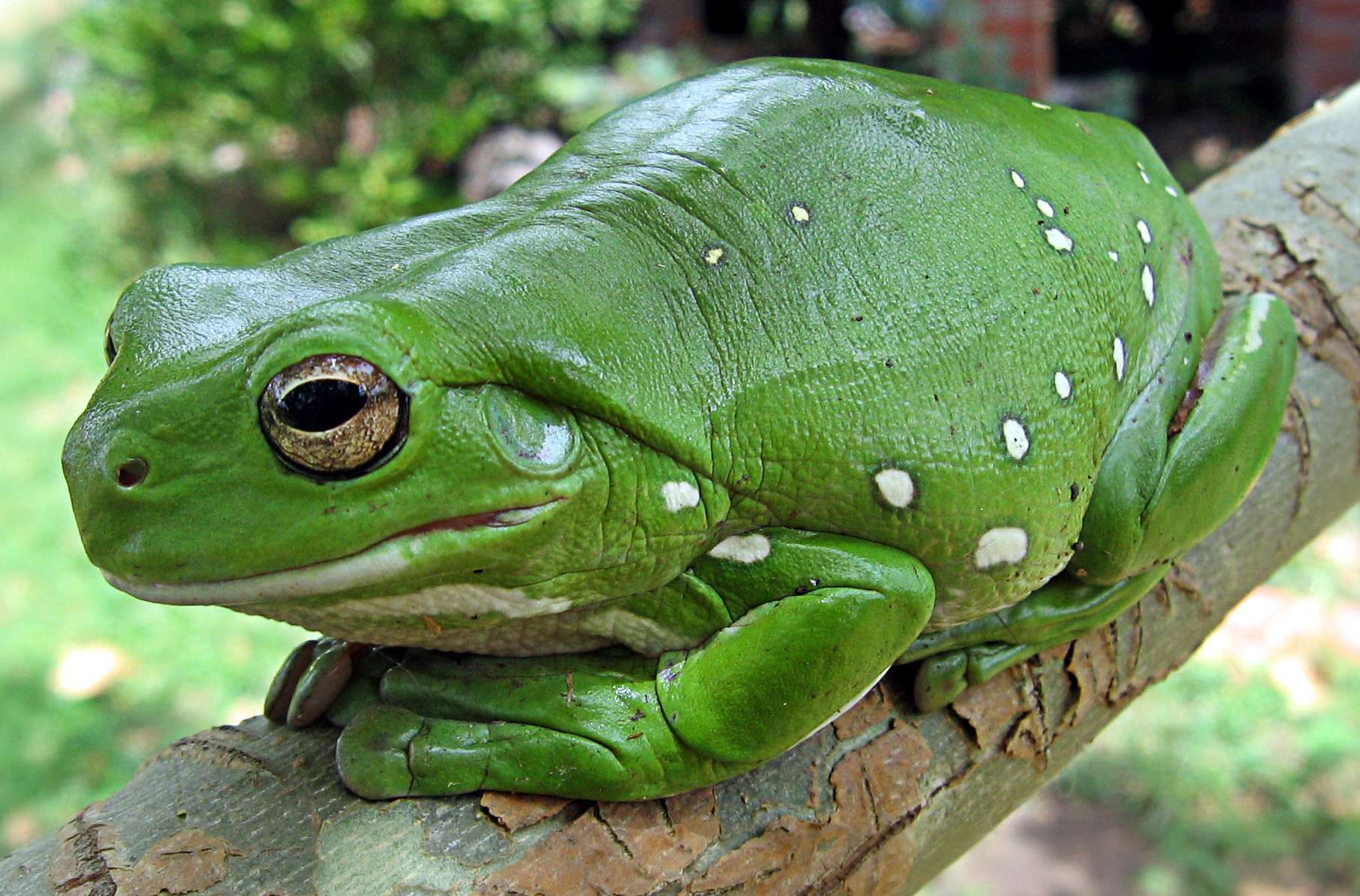

Conservation status
- Least Concern (IUCN 3.1)

Scientific classification
- Kingdom: Animalia
- Phylum: Chordata
- Class: Amphibia
- Order: Anura
- Family: Pelodryadidae
- Genus: Pelodryas
- Species: P. caerulea

Binomial name
- Pelodryas caerulea White, 1790
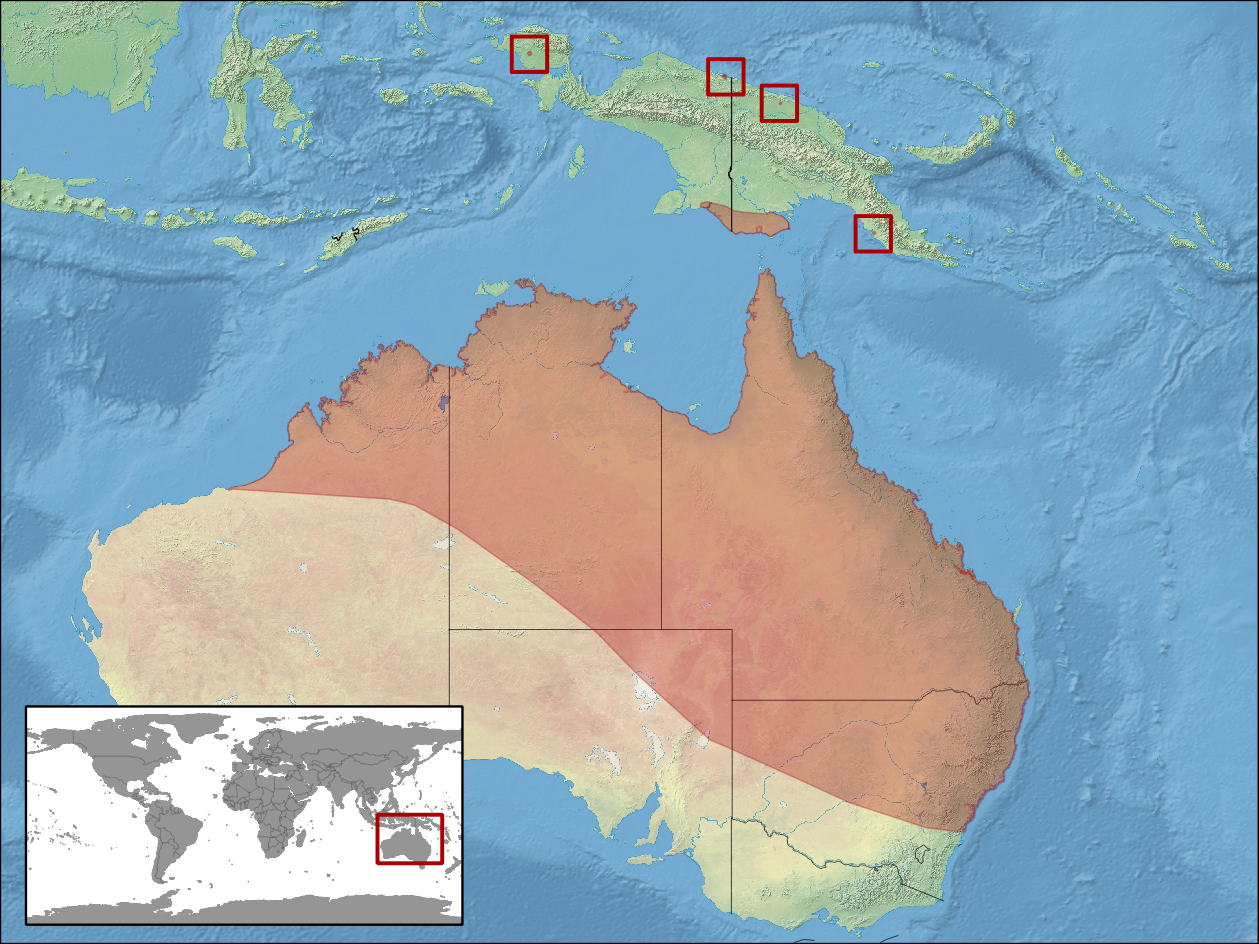
- Distribution

Synonyms
- List: Litoria caerulea White 1790; Rana caerulea (White 1790); Rana austrasiae (Schneider 1799); Hyla cyanea (Daudin 1803); Rana coerulea (Daudin 1803); Hyla cyanea (Peron 1807); Hyla irrorata (De Vis 1884); Ranoidea caerulea (White 1790)

= Australian green tree frog =

Species of amphibian

The Australian green tree frog (Pelodryas caerulea), also known as simply green tree frog in Australia, White's tree frog, or dumpy tree frog, is a species of tree frog native to Australia and New Guinea, with introduced populations in the United States and New Zealand, though the latter is believed to have died out. It is morphologically similar to some other members of its family, particularly the magnificent tree frog (P. splendida) and the white-lipped tree frog (Sandyrana infrafrenata).

Larger than most Australian frogs, the Australian green tree frog reaches 10 cm (4 in) or more in length. Its average lifespan in captivity, about 16 years, is long compared with most frogs. Docile and well suited to living near human dwellings, Australian green tree frogs are often found on window sills or inside houses, eating insects drawn by the light. The green tree frog screams when it is in danger to scare off its foe, and squeaks when it is touched.

Due to its appearance and behavioural traits, the green tree frog is a popular exotic pet throughout the world. The skin secretions of the frog have antibacterial and antiviral properties that may prove useful in pharmaceutical preparations and which have rendered it relatively immune to the population declines being experienced by many species of amphibian. It is a common species and the International Union for Conservation of Nature has assessed its conservation status as being "least concern".

== Taxonomy ==
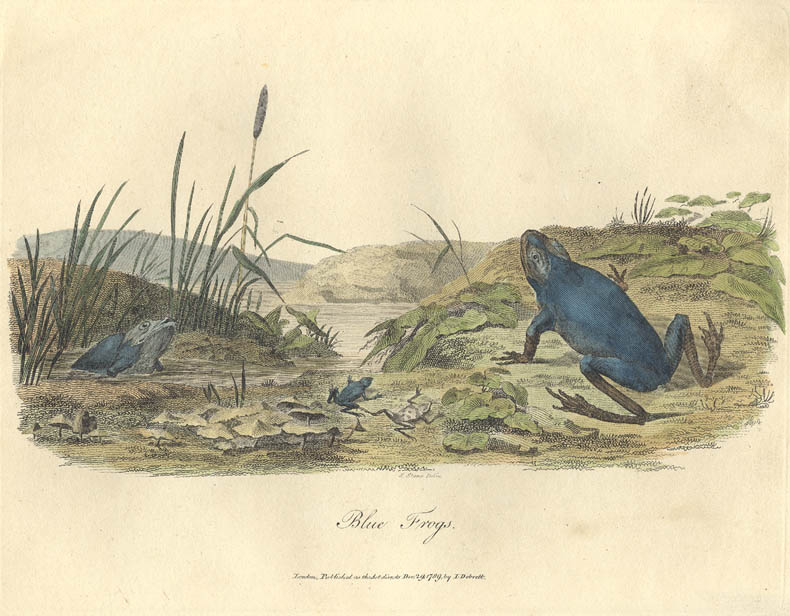
Original print of the Australian green tree frog, published in John White's Journal of a Voyage to New South Wales. Artist: S. Stone

The Australian green tree frog is a member of the family Pelodryadidae, which is endemic to Australia and New Guinea. The common name of the species, "White's tree frog", is in honour of John White's first description in 1790. The green tree frog was the first Australian frog to be scientifically described; the original specimen found its way into the collection of Sir Joseph Banks, but was destroyed when the Hunterian Museum in London was bombed in World War II.

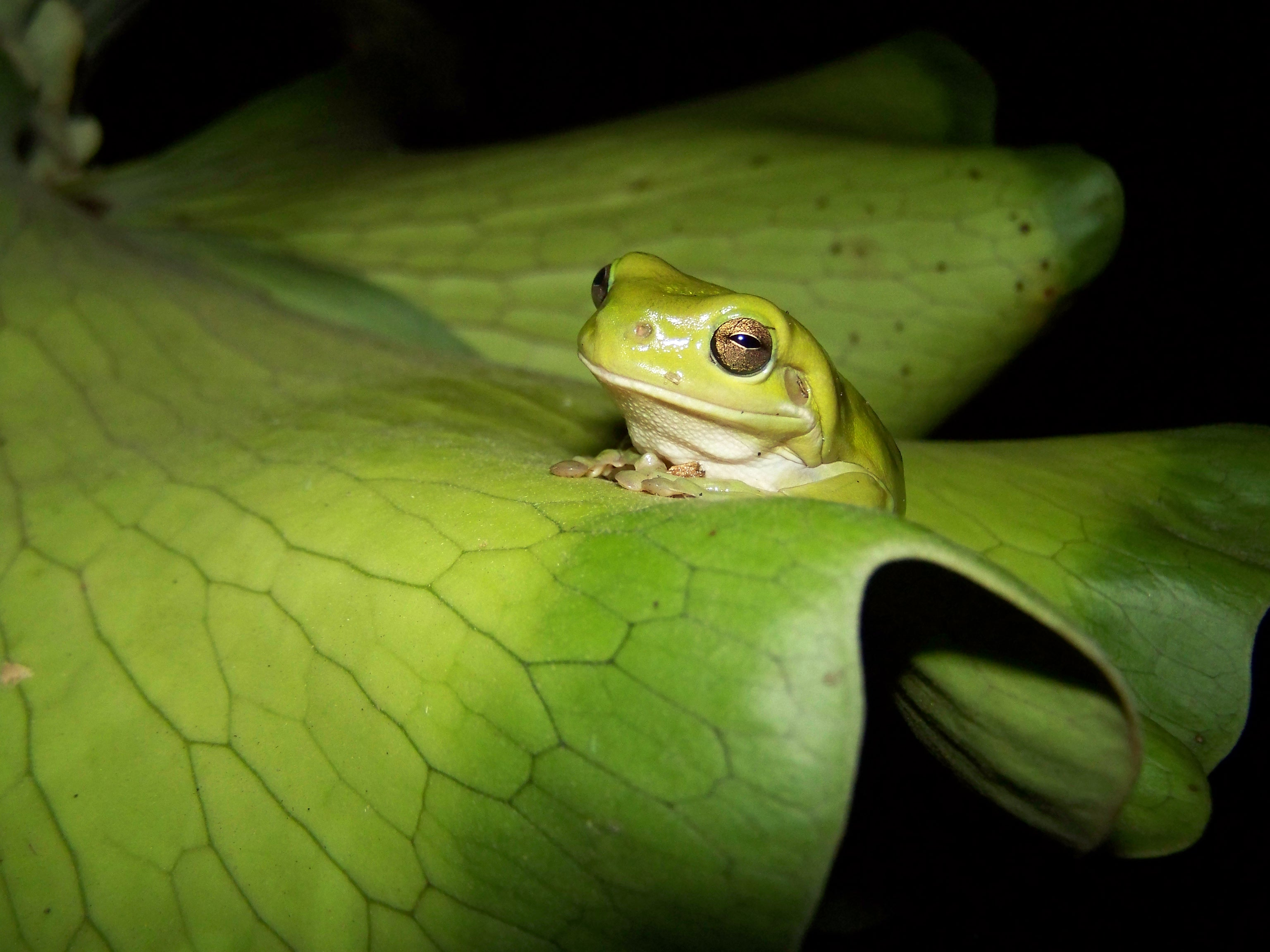
Young male specimen sitting on leaf

The species was originally called the "blue frog" (Rana caerulea) despite its green colour. The specimens White sent to England were damaged by the preservative and appeared blue. The colour of the frog is caused by blue and green pigments covered in a yellow layer; the preservative destroyed the yellow layer and left the frog with a blue appearance. The specific epithet, caerulea, which is Latin for blue, has remained. This frog is often referred to as Litoria caerulea in the scientific literature. In Australia, the frog is also known more simply as the "green tree frog", but that name is often given to the most common green arboreal species in a region, such as the American green tree frog (Hyla cinerea).

A 2020 study showed that Pelodryas caerulea is actually a species complex that includes recently identified species such as Pelodryas mira, which is endemic to New Guinea.

== Description ==
The green tree frog is a plump, rather large tree frog, and can grow up to 11.5 cm (4.5 in) in length, with fully grown females being slightly larger than males. A distinctive fatty ridge is seen over the eye, and the parotoid gland is moderately large. The iris is golden and has a horizontally slit pupil, and the tympanum (a skin membrane similar to an eardrum) is visible just behind the eye. Selective breeding has also resulted in blue irises. The forelimbs are short and robust while the hind limbs extend to be very long, and large, circular adhesive discs at the end of each digit provide grip while climbing. The fingers are about one-third webbed, and the toes nearly three-quarters webbed. The dorsal colour depends on the temperature and nature of the environment, ranging from brown, brownish- or greyish-green, to bright emerald green. Selective breeding in captivity has also resulted in "honey"-toned individuals whose colors vary from mauve to pale yellow. The frog occasionally has small, irregularly shaped white spots on its back. Selective breeding in captivity has resulted in individuals with a greater number of these white spots. Males have a wrinkled vocal sac under the throat which can vary in color from grey to yellow, while the throat of females is white and the skin is more taut. The ventral surface in both sexes is creamy-white and rough in texture.

This frog is similar in appearance to the magnificent tree frog (R. splendida), which inhabits only north-western Australia. Older members of that species have very large parotoid glands, which cover the entire top of their heads and droop over their tympana. The parotoid gland of the green tree frog is much smaller, and it also lacks the yellow speckling on the back and the yellow markings on the hand, groin, and thigh. It can be distinguished from the white-lipped tree frog (giant tree frog N. infrafrenatus) by the distinct white stripe that species has along the edge of the lower jaw and extending to the shoulder, which is not present in the green tree frog.

Some arboreal hylid frogs benefit from two hygroscopically-enabled hydration processes: transcutaneous uptake of condensation on their skin and reduced evaporative water loss. Their wiping behaviour spreads hygroscopic secretions from the parotoid gland across their skin, facilitating both methods. P. caerulea's skin structure, the hygroscopic coating, and an advantageous temperature gradient combine to boost condensation and moisture uptake.

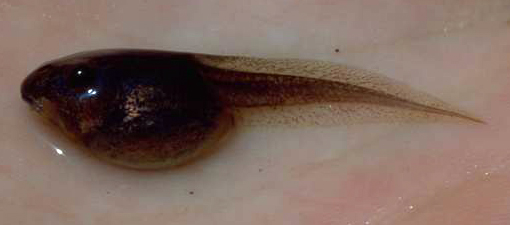
Tadpole

The tadpoles' appearance changes throughout their development. When newly hatched, they are 8 mm (0.3 in) long and when fully developed, 44 mm (1.7 in). They are initially mottled with brown, and increase in pigmentation (to either green or brown) during development. Their undersides are initially dark, but later become lighter in hue. The eggs are brown and are wrapped in a clear jelly; they are 1.1 to 1.4 mm (0.043 to 0.055 in) in diameter.

The call is a low, slow brawk-brawk-brawk, repeated many times. For most of the year, the frogs call from high positions, such as trees and gutters, but during the breeding season, they descend to near the ponds and pools, where they breed. Like many frogs, green tree frogs call not only to attract a mate, but also to advertise their location outside the mating season. They are particularly vocal after rain, but the reasons for this are unclear. They emit a stress call when they are in danger, such as when being attacked by a predator or when a person steps on the log in which one is concealed.

== Distribution and habitat ==
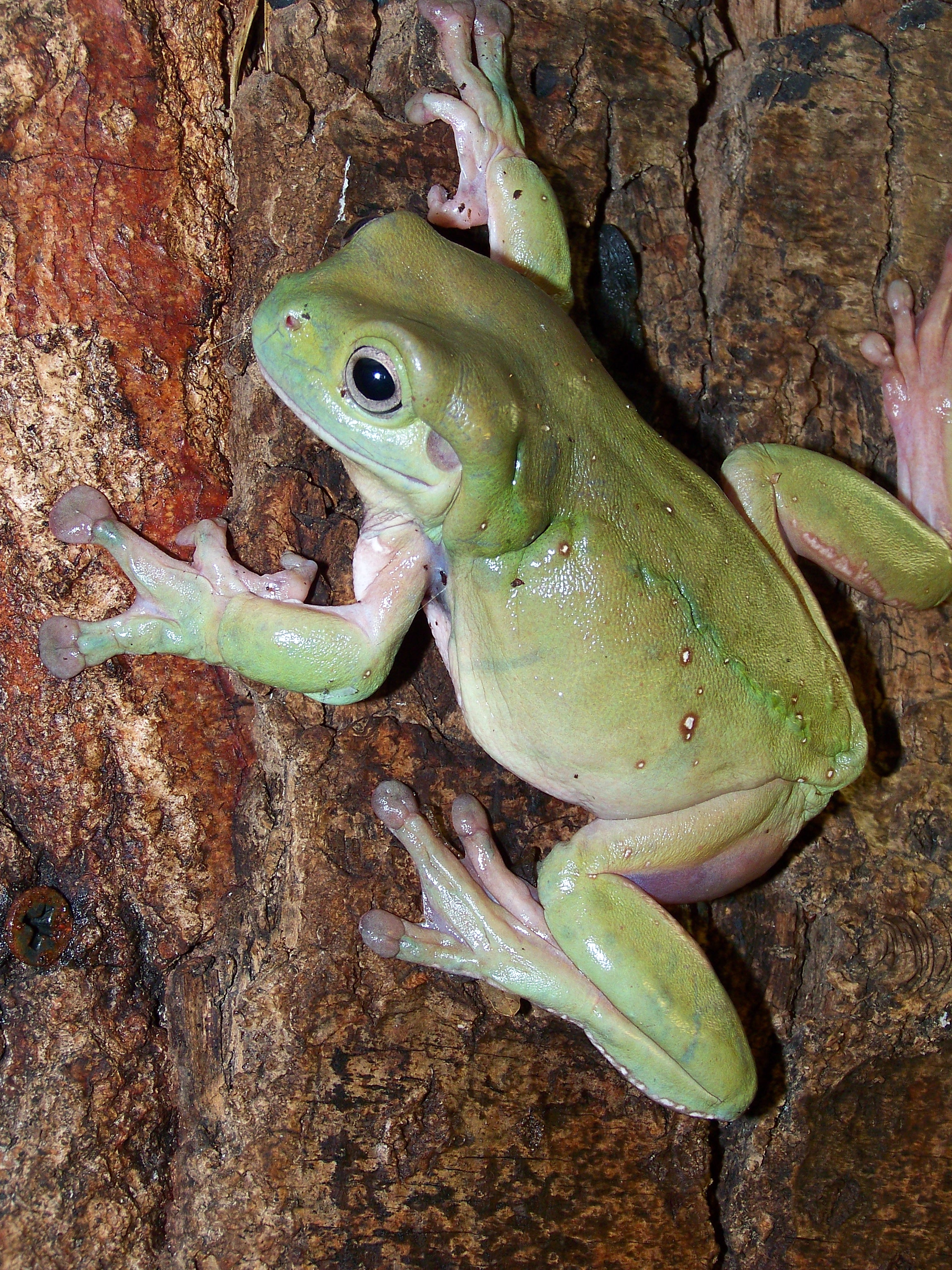
Specimen climbing a tree

The green tree frog is native to northern and eastern regions of Australia and to the lowlands of New Guinea. Distribution is limited mostly to areas with warm, wet tropical climates. Its range spans from Irian Jaya to Port Moresby, and is most abundant on Daru Island. The IUCN suggests "scattered locations" in both New Guinea and Indonesia. In Australia, its range extends from the Kimberley region of Western Australia through the Northern Territory and Queensland to north and central New South Wales and the extreme northeasterly part of South Australia. Its total extent of land occupancy is around 4,078,600 square kilometres (1,574,800 sq mi).

The species has been introduced to both the United States and New Zealand. In the United States, it is restricted to two regions within Florida, where it was possibly introduced through the pet trade. Only small populations have been found there, and whether they have caused any ecological damage as an invasive species is unknown. In New Zealand, several individuals were liberated in various locations in 1897 and 1899, and a further accidental introduction was made in the 1940s. No sightings have been reported of this species since the 1950s.

Depending on their location, green tree frogs occupy various habitats. They prefer moist forests but are not strictly limited to tropical rainforests. They are often found in the canopy of trees near water bodies, but also occupy terrestrial habitats well away from water. They favour old stands of Eucalyptus, where the trees have hollows in which water collects. They are common along inland waterways and can survive in swamps (among the reeds) or in grasslands in cooler climates.

Green tree frogs are little troubled by the presence of humans and often live in close association with them. They sometimes stray inside houses and are found in such places as sinks and toilets. They can also be found on outside windowsills at night, eating insects attracted to the light, and they may gather under outdoor lighting for the same reason. They sometimes occupy tanks (cisterns), downpipes (downspouts), and gutters, as these have high humidity and are usually cooler than the external environment. They may be drawn to the downpipes and tanks during the mating season because the fixtures amplify their calls. Green tree frogs seem to have homing abilities, being able to return to locations from which they were caught from a considerable distance after being displaced.

== Ecology and behaviour ==
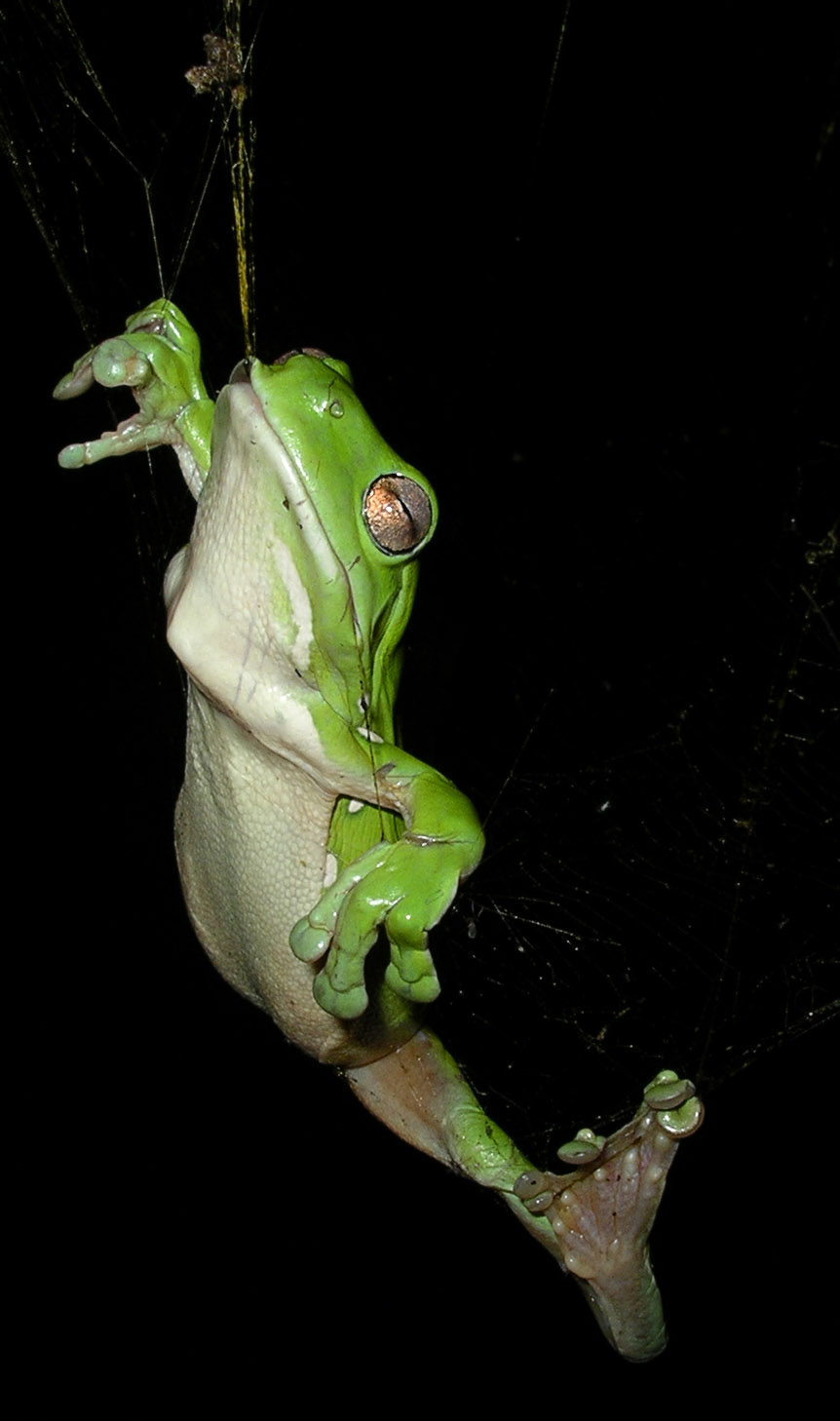
An Australian green tree frog in a spider's web after eating the spider

Australian green tree frogs are very docile and unafraid of humans. They are nocturnal and come out in early evenings to call (in spring and summer) and hunt for food. During the day, they find cool, dark, and moist areas, such as tree holes or rock crevices, in which to sleep. They are not a rainforest species, but make use of the rain that falls almost daily and collects on leaves and in crevices, to keep themselves moist. Their skin exudes a waxy coating that helps prevent evaporation. In dry periods, they avoid desiccation by concealing themselves in a cool spot, perhaps by burrowing, and enveloping themselves in a cocoon made of shed skin and mucus. While there is insufficient evidence proving that they are a social species, they have also been shown to gather together in "clumps" while sleeping, possibly to conserve moisture through skin-to-skin contact.

The diet of the green tree frog consists mainly of insects such as moths, cockroaches, and locusts. They also eat spiders and can include smaller frogs and even small mammals (including bats, such as little bent-wing bats, microbats and other unidentified bats) among their prey. Frog teeth are not suited to cutting up prey, so the food item must be small enough to fit inside its mouth.

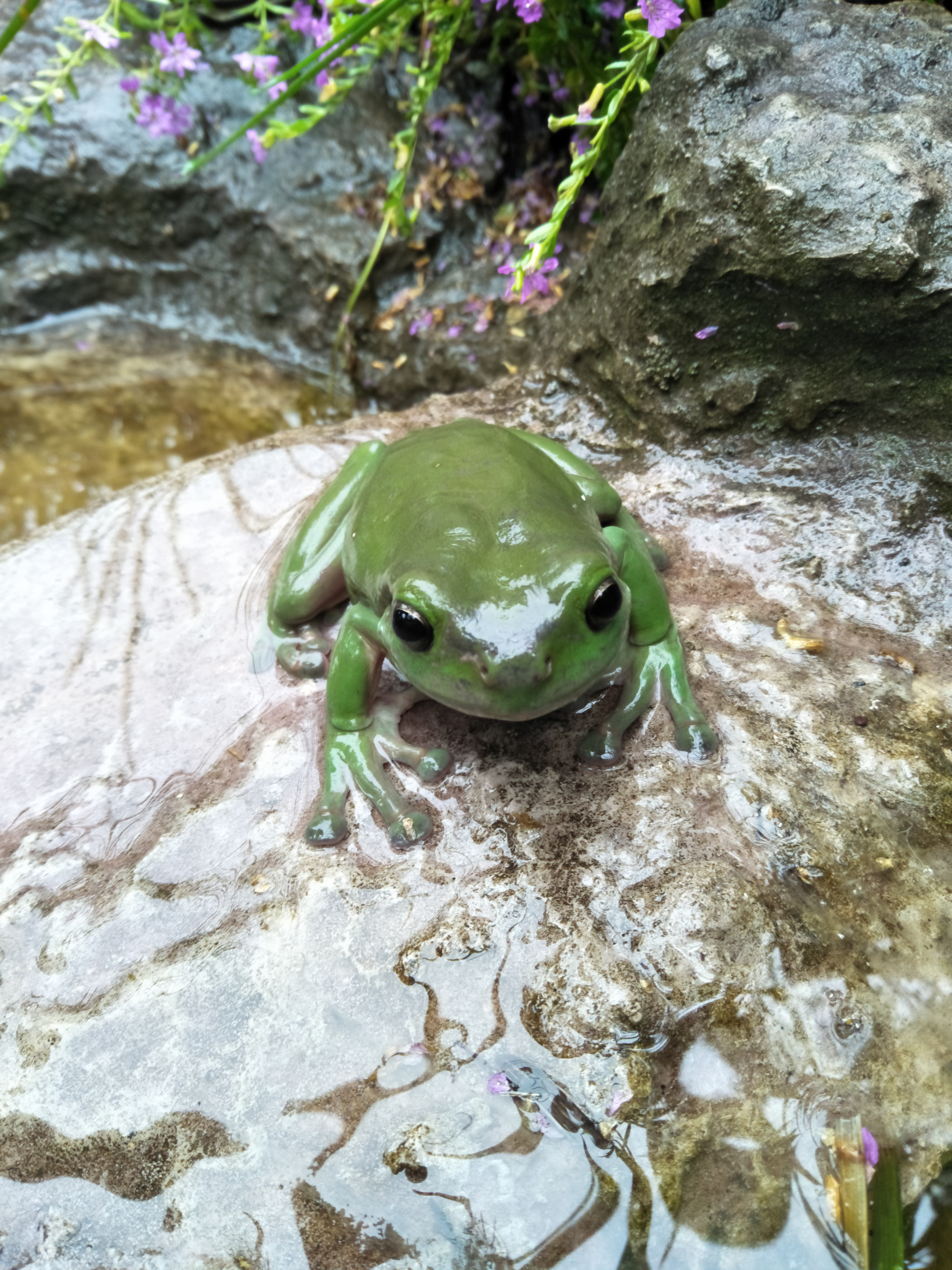
Green tree frogs often show up after rain

Many frogs flick out their sticky tongues at prey and the victim sticks to the tip and is drawn back into the mouth and consumed. A green tree frog uses this technique for smaller prey; for larger items, however, it pounces, then pushes the prey into its mouth with its hands.

The frog has a few native predators, among them snakes and birds. Since the European settlement of Australia, non-native predators have been introduced, primarily dogs and cats. The species has an average life expectancy in captivity of 16 years, but some have been known to live over 20 years.

== Reproduction ==
Breeding occurs between November and February. During the mating season, the males call from slightly elevated positions close to the still-water sources in which they choose to breed. Clumps of between 200 and 2000 eggs are laid which initially float, but sink within 24 hours. The development of the tadpoles takes about six weeks, after which they undergo metamorphosis and leave the water as juvenile frogs.

== As pets ==
The green tree frog is one of the most popular pet frogs throughout the world. Its docile nature and long life expectancy make it an attractive choice for exotic pet owners. It is also one of the easier frogs to maintain; its diet is broad and it has a strong resistance to disease. One problem commonly associated with keeping this species as a pet is overfeeding; green tree frogs tend to become obese if overfed. In the wild, exertion of energy is required for a frog to capture its prey. However, in captivity, they are usually given live feed in a confined space. This lessens the activity needed for feeding, resulting in weight gain. An overweight member of the species deposits fat layers over the top of the head and body, giving it a "dumpy" appearance, thus the name "dumpy tree frog".

The rover fireflies of the genus Photinus (including the common eastern firefly of North America) are poisonous to these frogs, and an incident has been reported in which a firefly was fed to a green tree frog, which subsequently died.

== Conservation ==
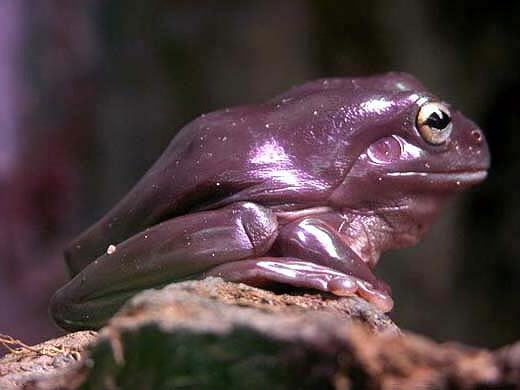
Dark specimen in Cologne Zoo

Australian law gives protected status to the green tree frog—along with all Australian fauna—under the federal Environment Protection and Biodiversity Conservation Act 1999. The International Union for Conservation of Nature lists the green tree frog's conservation status as being of "least concern", given its broad range, its large total population, and its tolerance of a variety of habitat types. The population trend seems to be stable, and any decline in numbers is not likely to be at a fast enough rate to justify listing it in a more threatened category.

In suburban areas, this frog is threatened by pollution and by predation by domestic animals. Also, some of the frogs have been found to be infected with the chytrid fungus which causes the fatal amphibian disease chytridiomycosis. The frog's status in New Guinea is poorly studied, but in 2002, some 75,000 individuals were exported from Indonesia as part of the pet trade, and this may impact populations in some locations. The frog is present in a number of protected areas in New Guinea, and it has been successfully bred in some Australian zoos. Overall, the main threat to this species is the potential for a widespread disease epidemic.

== Use in research ==
Although frogs have lungs, they absorb oxygen through their skin; for this to occur efficiently, the skin must be moist. A disadvantage of moist skin is that pathogens such as molds and bacteria can thrive on it, increasing the chance of infection. To counteract this, frogs secrete peptides that destroy these pathogens. The secretion from the paratoid gland of the green tree frog contains 25 caerins, a group of peptides with antibacterial and antiviral properties. The caerins produced by frogs of this species from different geographical localities have subtle but reproducible differences. The secretions also contain caeruleins, which have the same physiological effects as CCK-8, a digestive hormone and hunger suppressant. These caeruleins now have a number of clinical applications. Several peptides from the skin secretions of the green tree frog have been found to destroy HIV without harming healthy T cells.

The fungus Batrachochytrium dendrobatidis, the causal agent of chytridiomycosis, is causing declines in many species of amphibians, but the secretions produced by the green tree frog and certain other Australian species of frog (Chlorohyla chloris and Spicicalyx serrata) are protective against this fungus. The peptides inhibit the growth of the fungus in vitro and these frog species are believed not to be in decline.

Green tree frogs are sometimes used as model animals in research. The structure of their toe pads was used to investigate the microstructure and properties of the epithelium that allows the animals to adhere to wet surfaces.

== Bibliography ==
- Australian Biological Resources Study (1993). Fauna of Australia: Amphibia & Reptilia. Canberra: Australian Govt. Pub. Service. ISBN 978-0-644-32429-8. Archived from the original on 30 March 2021.
- Bruin, T. "ADW: Litoria caerulea: Information". Archived from the original on 12 June 2005.
- Cogger, Harold G. (1979). Reptiles & Amphibians of Australia. A. H. & A. W. REED PTY LTS. ISBN 978-0-589-50108-2.
- Egerton, L. ed. (2005). Encyclopedia of Australian wildlife. Reader's Digest ISBN 1-876689-34-X
- Menzies, J. I. (1976). Handbook of Common New Guinea Frogs. Wau Ecology Institute.
- Tyler, M. J. (1994). Australian Frogs A Natural History. Reed Books. ISBN 978-0-7301-0468-1.
