= Toorak (disambiguation) =

Toorak is an inner south-eastern suburb of Melbourne, Victoria, Australia.

Toorak may also refer to:

- Toorak College, Mount Eliza, approximately 40 km south of Melbourne
- Toorak Gardens, South Australia, an inner eastern suburb of Adelaide initially named Toorak
- Toorak Handicap, a thoroughbred horse race held in Melbourne
- Toorak House, Toorak, Victoria
- Toorak Park, Armadale, Victoria
- Toorak railway station, Melbourne
- Toorak Shule, the oldest Jewish congregation in Melbourne
- Toorak Tractor, Melbourne slang for a (luxury) sport utility vehicle
- Toorak Village, a shopping precinct in Toorak, Victoria
- Electoral district of Toorak, a former Victorian Legislative Assembly electorate
