= List of official residences of Australia =

Below is a list of official residences of Australia.

== Current official residences ==
=== Federal ===
- Government House, Canberra, residence of the Governor-General of Australia in Canberra
- Admiralty House, Kirribilli, residence of the Governor-General of Australia in Sydney
- The Lodge, Canberra, residence of the Prime Minister of Australia in Canberra
- Kirribilli House, Sydney, residence of the Prime Minister of Australia in Sydney

=== State and territory ===
- Government House, Adelaide, residence of the Governor of South Australia
- Government House, Brisbane, residence of the Governor of Queensland
- Government House, Darwin, residence of the Administrator of the Northern Territory
- Government House, Hobart, residence of the Governor of Tasmania
- Government House, Melbourne, residence of the Governor of Victoria
- Government House, Norfolk Island, residence of the Administrator of Norfolk Island
- Government House, Perth, residence of the Governor of Western Australia
- Government House, Sydney, residence of the Governor of New South Wales

== Former official residences ==
- First Government House, Sydney, former residence of the Governor of New South Wales, 1788-1845
- Old Government House, Parramatta, former residence of the Governor of New South Wales, built in 1799
- Cranbrook, Bellevue Hill, former residence of the Governor of New South Wales, 1901–1917
- Old Government House, Queensland, former residence of the Governor of Queensland, 1862–1910
- Old Government House, South Australia, former residence of the Governor of South Australia, 1860–1880
- Old Government House, Hobart, former residence of the Governor of Tasmania
- Toorak House, former residence of the Governor of Victoria, 1854–1876
- Stonington mansion, former residence of the Governor of Victoria, 1901–1931

== Summer residences ==
- Hillview, Sutton Forest, former summer residence of the Governor of New South Wales, 1885–1957
- Harlaxton House in Toowoomba, former summer residence of the Governor of Queensland
- Fernside in Toowoomba, former summer residence of the Governor of Queensland
- Gabbinar in Toowoomba, former summer residence of the Governor of Queensland
- Marble Hill, South Australia, former summer residence of the Governor of South Australia, 1880–1955
- Government House on Rottnest Island, former summer residence of the Governor of Western Australia, 1864-1919.

== See also ==
- Government Houses of the Commonwealth
