= Government House, Sydney =

Official residence of the governor of New South Wales

Government House
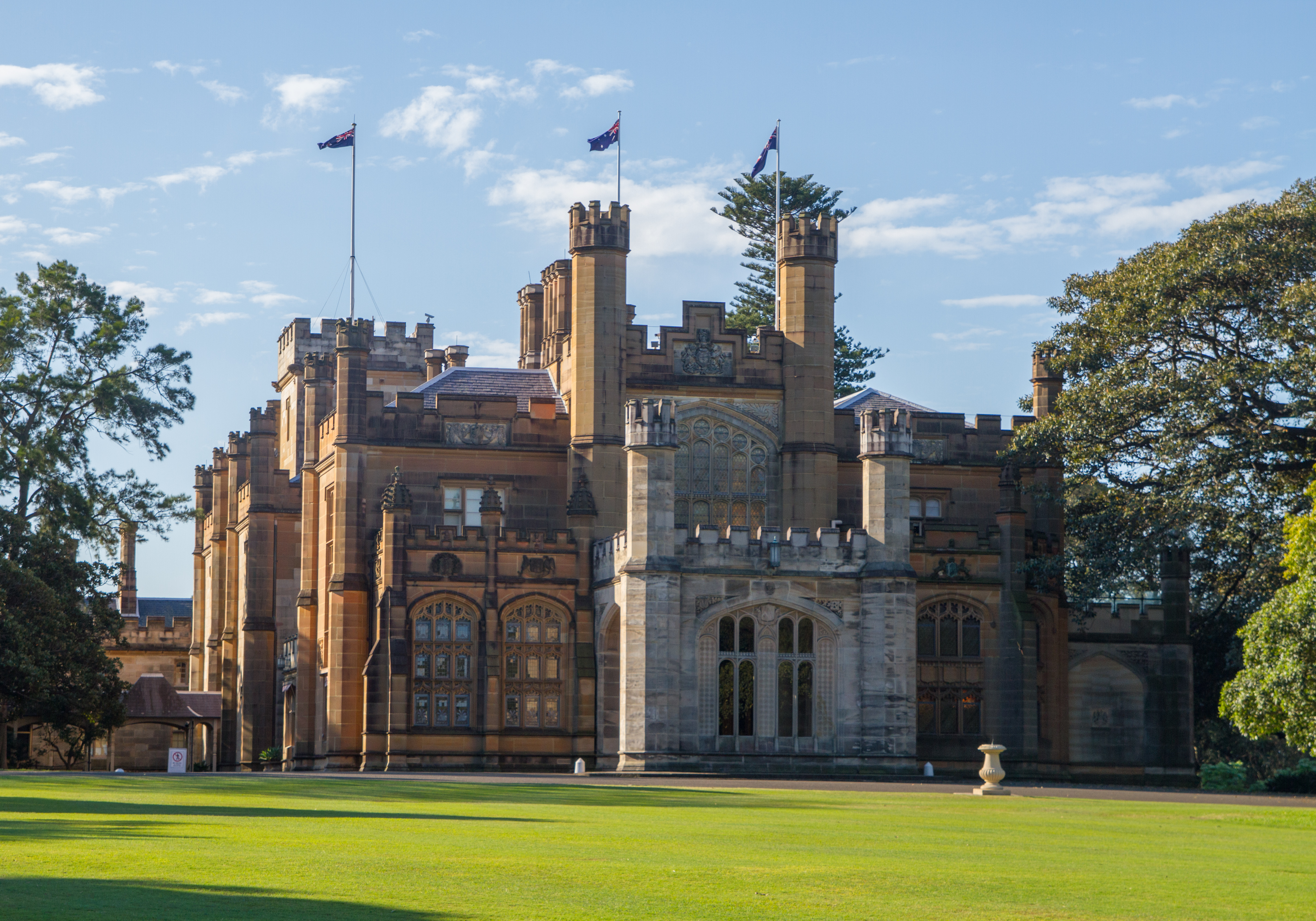
- Main façade of Government House

- Location within Sydney

General information
- Status: Completed
- Type: Vice-regal residence
- Architectural style: Gothic revival style
- Location: Royal Botanic Gardens, Conservatorium Road, Bennelong Point, Sydney, New South Wales, Australia
- Coordinates: 33°51′36″S 151°12′54″E
- Current tenants: Governor of New South Wales (as the vice-regal representative of the King of Australia)
- Construction started: 1837
- Completed: 1847
- Owner: The King in Right of New South Wales (via the Department of Premier and Cabinet)

Design and construction
- Architects: Mortimer Lewis; Edward Blore
- Architecture firm: Colonial Architect of New South Wales

New South Wales Heritage Register
- Official name: Government House, Movable Heritage Collection and Gardens
- Type: state heritage (complex / group)
- Criteria: a., b., c., d., e., f.
- Designated: 13 December 2011
- Reference no.: 1872
- Type: Government House
- Category: Government and Administration
- Builders: Various tradesmen supervised by Mortimer Lewis

Government House is the heritage-listed vice-regal residence of the governor of New South Wales. It is located on Conservatorium Road in the Sydney central business district, adjacent to the Royal Botanic Garden, and is situated south of the Sydney Opera House, overlooking Sydney Harbour. Constructed between 1837 and 1843, the property has been the primary vice-regal residence of the Governor since Sir George Gipps, except for two brief periods; the first between 1901 and 1914, when the property was leased to the Commonwealth of Australia as the residence of the Governor-General of Australia, and the second from 1996 to 2011.

The property was returned as the Governor's residence in October 2011 and was managed by the Historic Houses Trust of New South Wales from March 1996 to December 2013. Completed in 1847 and constructed in the Gothic revival style, the building is listed on the New South Wales State Heritage Register.

== History ==
=== 1845–1901 ===
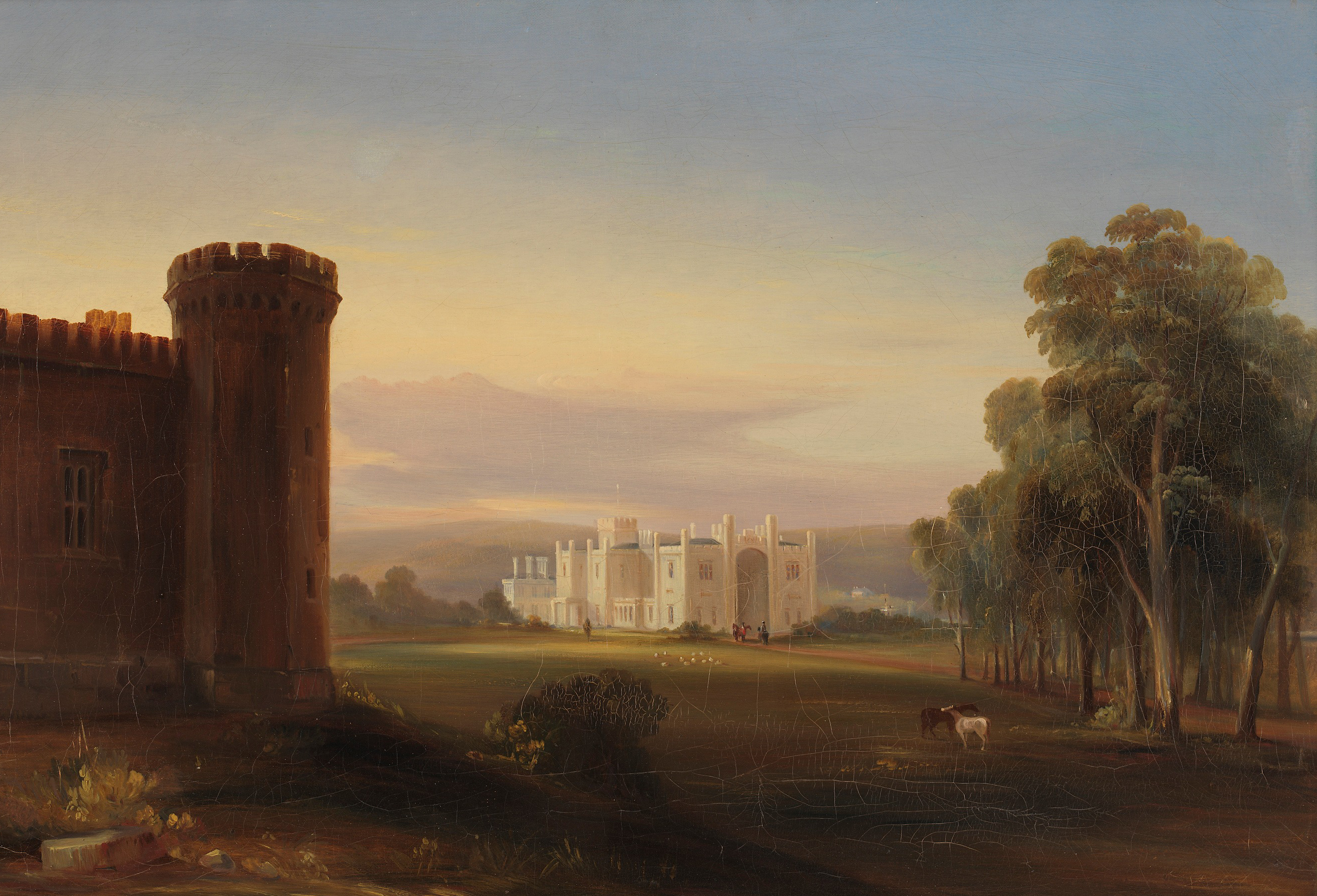
Government House, 1841

In 1835 the British Government agreed that a new Government House in Sydney had become a necessity, and the royal architect, Edward Blore, was instructed to draw up plans. Construction commenced in 1837 and was supervised by colonial architect Mortimer Lewis and Colonel Barney of the Royal Engineers. Stone, cedar, and marble for the construction were obtained from various areas of New South Wales. A ball in honour of the birthday of Queen Victoria was held in the new building in 1843, although construction was not complete. The first resident, Governor George Gipps, did not move in until 1845.

Government House, with its setting on Sydney Harbour, has a garden area of five hectares (twelve acres) and is located south of the Sydney Opera House, overlooking Farm Cove. It was designed in a romantic Gothic revival style – castellated, crenellated, turreted and is decorated with oil portraits and the coats of arms of its successive occupants. Additions have included a front portico in 1873, an eastern verandah in 1879 and extensions to the ballroom and governor's study in 1900–1901. From 1845 until 1901, the building served as the Governor's residence, office and official reception space.

=== 1901–1914 ===
Between 1901 and 1914, the building was used to house the new role of Governor-General, created by the Federation of Australia. During this period, three Governors of New South Wales occupied Cranbrook, namely Harry Rawson, Frederic Thesiger, 1st Viscount Chelmsford and Gerald Strickland, 1st Baron Strickland.

In 1913, the decision was taken to establish a residence for the Governor-General at Admiralty House.

=== 1914–1996 ===
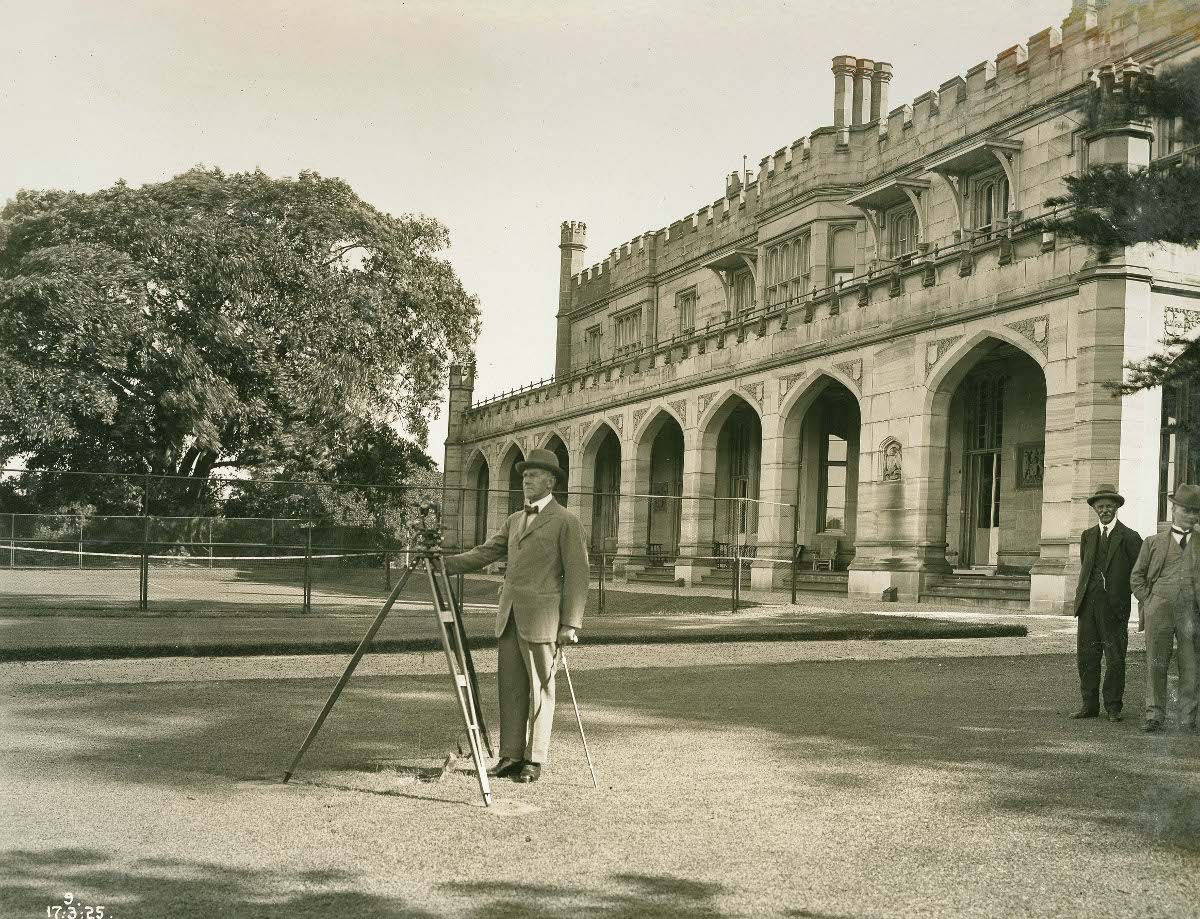
Governor Sir Dudley de Chair (1924–1930) outside Government House, 17 March 1925.

From 1914 to 1996, the building again served as the residence, office and official reception space for the Governor of New South Wales.

=== 1996–2011 ===
However, in 1996, at the direction of the then Premier of New South Wales, Bob Carr, the property ceased to be used as a residence; the Governor's day office was relocated to the historic Chief Secretary's building nearby, at 121 Macquarie Street. On 16 January 1996 Carr announced that the next Governor, Gordon Samuels, would not live or work at Government House. On these changes, Carr said "The Office of the Governor should be less associated with pomp and ceremony, less encumbered by anachronistic protocol, more in tune with the character of the people". Carr later quipped that his decision had been "for Jack Lang", referring to the Premier of a former state Labor Government that was dismissed by a Governor, Air Vice-Marshal Sir Philip Game, in 1932 during a constitutional crisis.

The state's longest-serving governor, Sir Roden Cutler, was also reported as saying:

"It's a political push to make way in New South Wales to lead the push for a republic. If they decide not to have a Governor and the public agrees with that, and Parliament agrees, and the Queen agrees to it, that is a different matter but while there is a Governor you have got to give him some respectability and credibility, because he is the host for the whole of New South Wales. For the life of me I cannot understand the logic of having a Governor who is part-time and doesn't live at Government House. It is such a degrading of the office and of the Governor."

— Sir Roden Cutler, 1996.

This move generated further controversy, as the proclaimed cost savings of over $2 million never materialised. The Auditor-General found it cost $600,000 more to maintain the building without a resident Governor; and public attendance decreased (resident Governors had maintained public access during their tenures). This led the group Australians for Constitutional Monarchy to organise a protest, resulting in one of the largest marches in Sydney history: a crowd of 15,000 protested outside Parliament House, blocking Macquarie Street. On the day before Gordon Samuels's swearing-in, a petition bearing 55,000 signatures was handed in, calling on the Premier to reconsider. During the hiatus of resident governor, Government House was consistently used for vice-regal purposes and remained the official reception space of the state, including as a key meeting venue of APEC Australia 2007 in September 2007, at which time the political leaders of the 21 member states of the Asia-Pacific Economic Cooperation met.

=== 2011–present ===
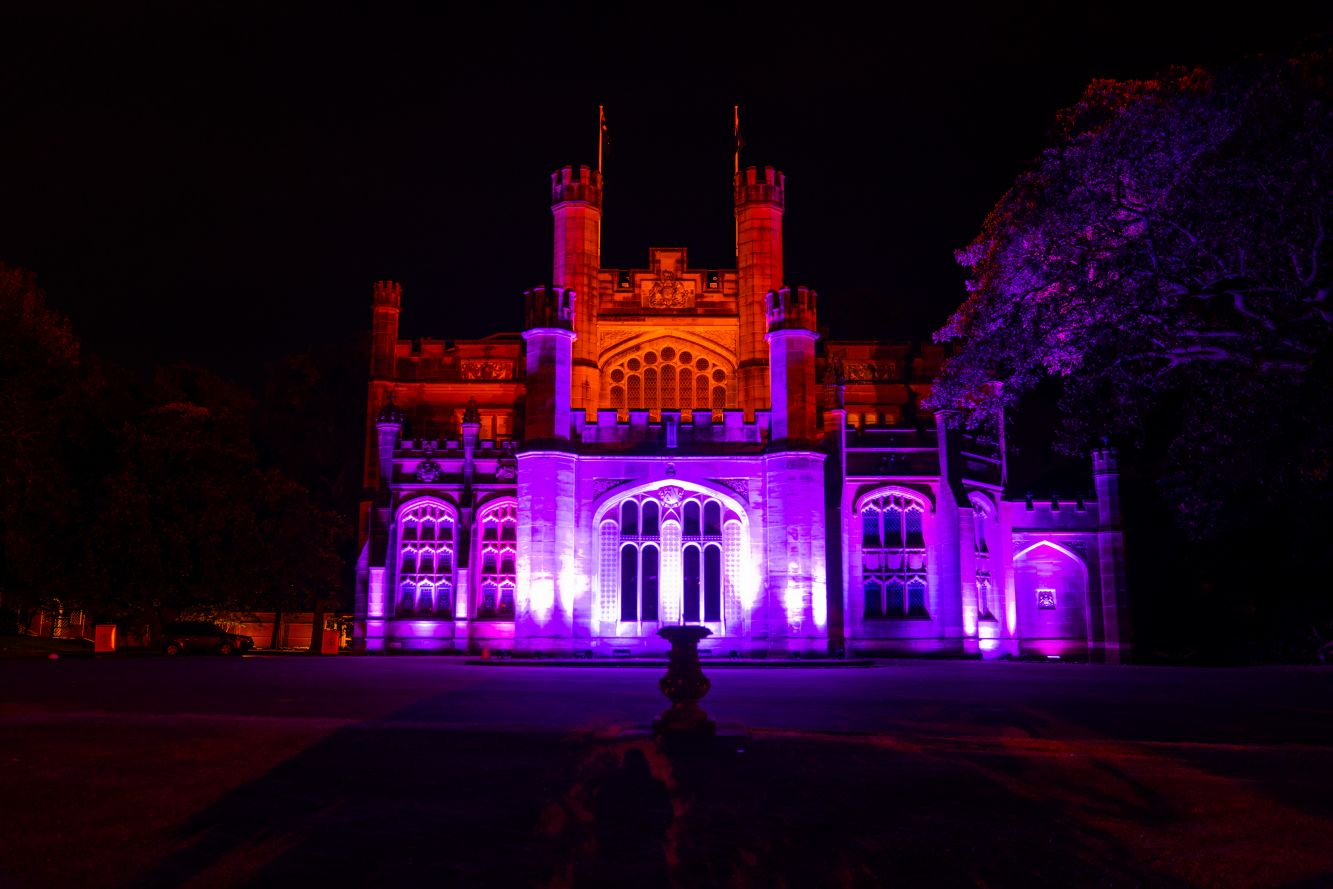
Government House illuminated in purple for the Queen's Platinum Jubilee in 2022

In October 2011, the then Premier Barry O'Farrell announced that the then Governor, Marie Bashir, had agreed with O'Farrell's offer to move back into Government House: "A lot of people believe the Governor should live at Government House. That's what it was built for ... [A]t some stage a rural or regional governor will be appointed and we will need to provide accommodation at Government House so it makes sense to provide appropriate living areas". However, because Government House had not been a residence for fifteen years, O'Farrell also announced that the Governor would initially move into a smaller adjacent building, called the chalet, while refurbishments of the main wing occurred, with a proposed move into the main house "before Christmas". From December 2013, management of Government House was returned to the Office of the Governor from the managers since 1996, the Historic Houses Trust of New South Wales.

== Description ==
=== Grounds ===
Much of the 19th-century character of the grounds remains. The grounds include private gardens as well as formal open areas. Near the house (on its south-east side) is a giant Moreton Bay fig (Ficus macrophylla), planted soon after the house's construction was completed. This tree is the surviving one of a former pair which stood either side of the terrace. The formal grounds of sweeping annual displays, manicured lawns, exotic trees and shrubs as well as the carriageways, paths and terraces provide a strong link with Sydney's colonial and Victorian heritage.

The garden maintains a distinctly 19th-century character, drawing on Regency and Italianate styles, and featuring a collection of native and exotic species. Most changes to the garden were at the initiative of past governors and their wives, including Denison's five acre vegetable garden and Lady Game's much-loved project, the "Spring Walk". Some areas of the garden are true to their 19th-century design, while others are more modern. Thousands of visitors enjoy the garden every year, both as public visitors and guests at functions ranging from garden parties for Royal visits, open days, award ceremonies and charity events. The garden is a crucial part of Government House – chef Christine Ware regularly sources honey (the current governor keeps bees), herbs and flowers for food served at functions. Florist Marjan Medhat has also been known to use flowers and natural ephemera from the grounds in her floral displays, alongside potted plants grown in the greenhouse.

The first private garden – the Western Terrace – sits around a rocky outcrop and knoll and features an extensive sandstone wall and plantings of olive trees.

Western terrace, 1836-1845

Lies inside the entrance gates to the left of the drive. This is the oldest part of the garden, established when the house was being built (1836–45) to provide screening and privacy for the house. The evergreen trees planted here – many of them native species – were chosen to block out "disagreeable scenery", but the large two-level terrace also functioned as a pleasure garden. The original sandstone walls, some of the gravel paths and plantings of olive trees and hedges survive. An evergreen or southern magnolia or bull bay (M. grandiflora) dating from the 1859s is at the northern end of the terrace. The terrace was restored in 2000 by Sydney Living Museums (fmr. Historic Houses Trust of NSW).

Eastern terrace, 1869

The eastern terrace's design was laid out in 1869 and remains the main feature of the garden. From the house's arcade (colonnade) you can view across bisecting pathways lined with flowerbeds to a view of Sydney Harbour. Through Cook's pines (Araucaria columnaris) and other trees you can see Fort Denison, Mrs Macquarie's Chair, Garden Island and beyond. Originally the view was wider to the east including towards the heads of the harbour). The Eastern Terrace has a central sandstone pond with its original stone fountain. Various garden schemes have been installed in the eastern terrace's formal garden borders flanking the central path.

Palm Grove, 1870s

North of the Eastern Terrace is the palm grove, established in the 1870s for the Countess of Belmore, wife of the 13th governor Somerset Lowry-Corry, 4th Earl Belmore. Here native and exotic palms including the Lord Howe Island's Kentia (Howea fosteriana) and curly (H.belmoreana) (named for the governor) can be found.

Spring Walk, 1930s

Governor and Lady Game were both keen gardeners and Lady Game "set out to produce an outstanding array of trees, shrubs and planters". She established the Spring Walk on the southern end of the Eastern Terrace, where she supplemented surviving 19th century Camellia japonica cv's with new plantings of modern varieties. Surviving very old camellias include C.j.'Cleopatra Rosea' (pink) and "Wellbankiana" (white), some of which are over 100 years old. Wife of Governor Game's private secretary, writer Ethel Anderson, had this to say about Lady Game's garden: 'under the grey green olives, late daffodils still star the grass. Watsonias, double cherries, magnolias, spireas, purple eupatoriums and primulas, set in a spring border among standard white wisterias form, like a sea... Lady Game's border - so lovely with pomegranates, bougainvilleas, cistus and Madonna lilies - keeps its date with beauty.' The entrance stones to the Spring Walk are said to be convict-made blocks from the first Government House built for Arthur Philip, now the site of the Museum of Sydney. Like many houses of the time, Government House was self sufficient with kitchen gardens, orchards and farm animals. The kitchen garden is now part of the Royal Botanic Gardens.

Official plantings

To the west of the driveway is a large paperbark (Melaleuca leucadendra) and peppermint (Eucalyptus nicholli) planted by Queen Elizabeth II and Prince Philip, Duke of Edinburgh in 1954 during the first visit of a reigning monarch to Australia. Many of the garden's trees are ceremonial plantings. Among the roses on the Eastern Terrace the "Dame Marie Bashir Rose" can be found (bred in that Governor's honour), as well as the "Governor Macquarie" rose Dame Bashir planted in 2009 as patron of the Rose Society of New South Wales. Dame Marie Bashir was just one of the many governors past and present with a passion for plants and their pollinators.

The Lodge c. 1846

One of two Gothic style buildings to have survived around Government House. It is a copy of a guardhouse at Windsor Castle.

Gatehouse c. 1937

Brick gatehouse replacing an earlier timber one.

The Chalet c. 1890

Designed by Colonial Architect W. L. Vernon, the chalet breaks with the Gothic style of Government House. However, it has Tudor Gothic elements such as half timbered gables and broad brick chimneys.

=== House ===
Government House is a Gothic Revival two-storey building with crenellated battlements, turrets, detailed interiors, extensive cellars and a porte-cochère at the entrance. An open cloister on the east elevation forms a verandah room which is supported by Gothic arches and forms an open balcony above. The ground floor contains twelve rooms and the first floor contains thirteen bedrooms. It is built of stone with a slate roof, timber floors, unpainted cedar joinery and a stone-flagged verandah. There are extensive staff offices and quarters.

==== Moveable Collection ====
A collection of moveable heritage noted in the Historic Houses Collection inventory as being of high and exceptional significance are also included in the State Heritage Listing. Items of exceptional significance are those deemed to be rare or outstanding and of major cultural or historic significance to NSW and Australia. Such items have a documented provenance to NSW Governors, their families and entourages from 1845 to the early 20th Century or with the first five Governors-General of Australia between 1901 and 1915. Items of high significance are objects considered to be rare or unusual and to have a cultural or historic significance to NSW. These objects date from 1845 through to the present and may contribute to the understanding of the house occupants and use or through their connection to artists, architects, craftsmen or suppliers associated with the construction and decoration of Government House.

=== Condition ===
As at 27 August 2014, the physical condition is excellent; and the archaeological potential is good. The whole assembly is relatively intact within its 1915–17 boundaries – including house, garden, gatehouse, Chalet, courtyards, garages, greenhouses etc. – and can show the development of the site and the management and workings of Government House.

=== Modifications and dates ===
- 1846-47 - Guardhouse built at entrance to the domain at the intersection of Bridge and Macquarie Streets
- 1854 - First coats of arms mounted on building
- 1863 - Deer House, Cow House and Conservatory constructed.
- 1873 - A porte cochere added
- 1879-80 - Construction of Colonnade and eastern arcade
- 1890-91 - Chalet commissioned and built
- 1899 - Ballroom extended.
- 1902-03 - Alterations and additions to accommodate Governor-General
- c. 1918-21 - Summer House in formal garden removed.
- Mid 20th c. - Eastern Terrace's main axial path paved with lage rectangular stones, side paths with crazy paving (and also widened in proportion, destroying the original path hierarchy) and stylish grass borders removed.
- 1948-54 - Additions and Renovations for Royal Visit by Queen Elizabeth II & Prince Philip.
- 1979-80 - Demolition of earlier outbuildings and construction of a new group of buildings.
- 1990-96 - Reconstruction of Vestibule interiors, restoration of East Terrace and various other construction and restoration works.
- 2004 - reinstatement of the c. 1840 garden layout and treatment of the Western Terrace.
- 2010 - replacement of Eastern Terrace side paths, new drainage, irrigation and planting of central beds.

== Heritage listing ==
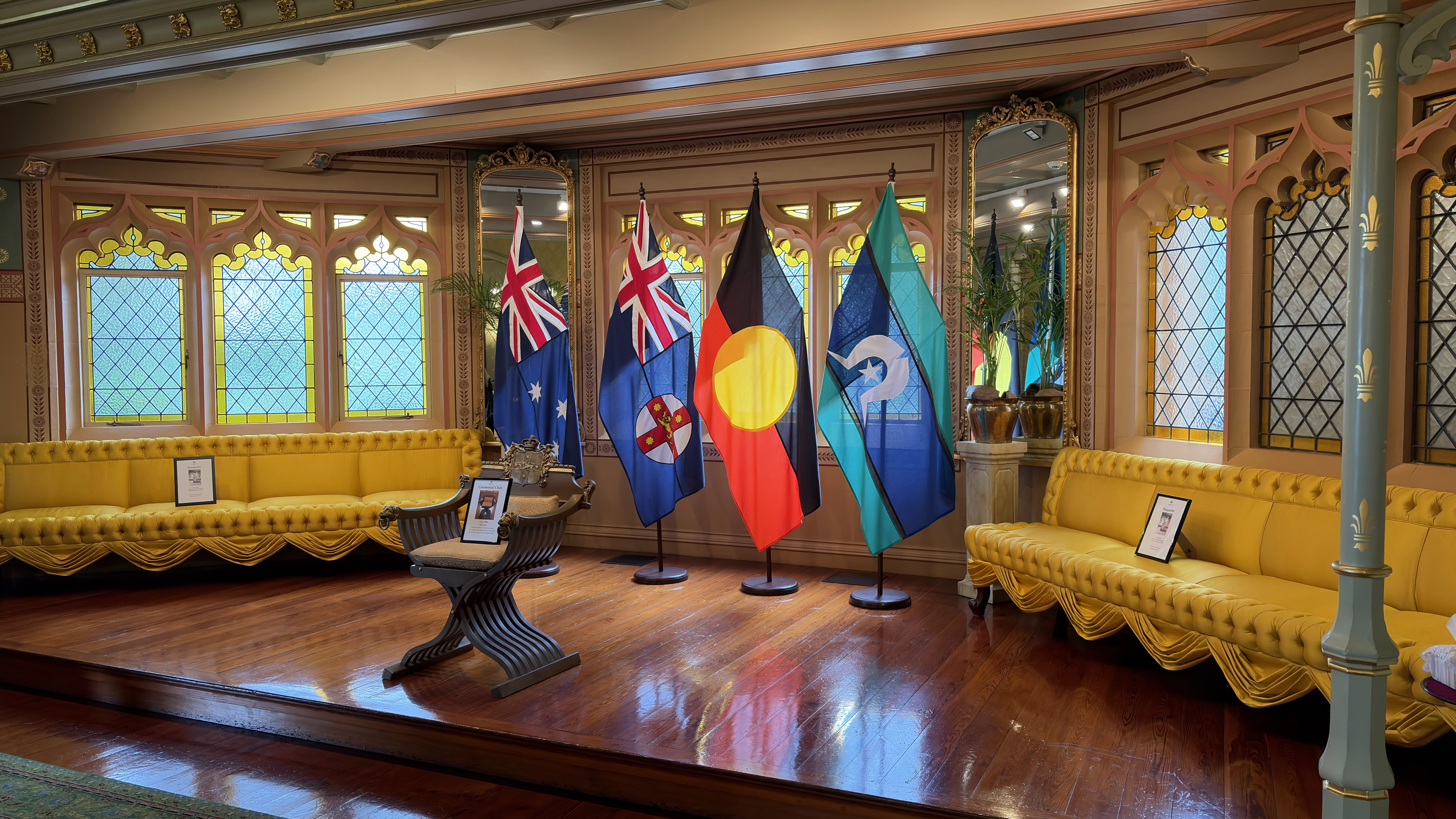
The Ballroom

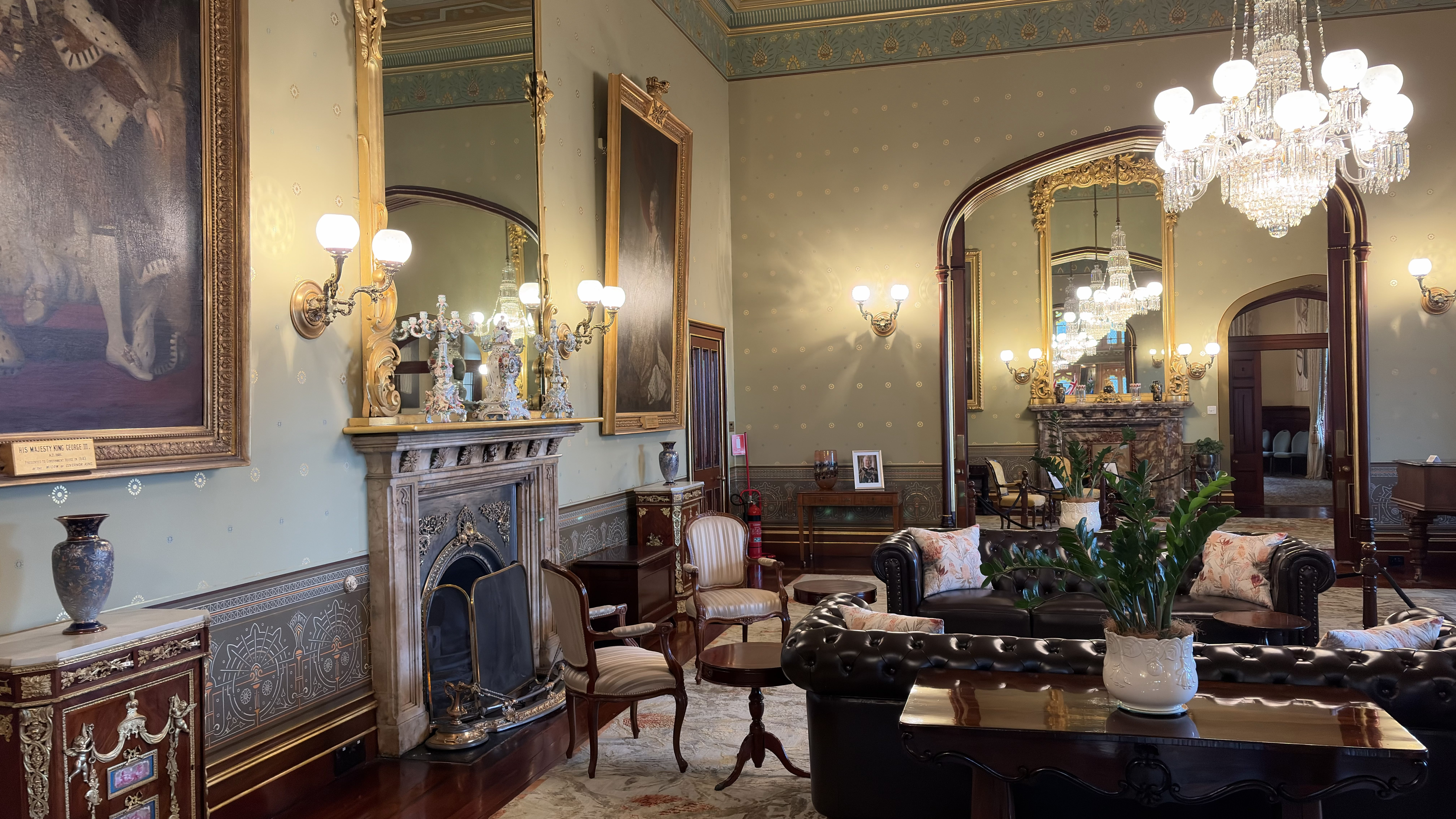
The Drawing Room

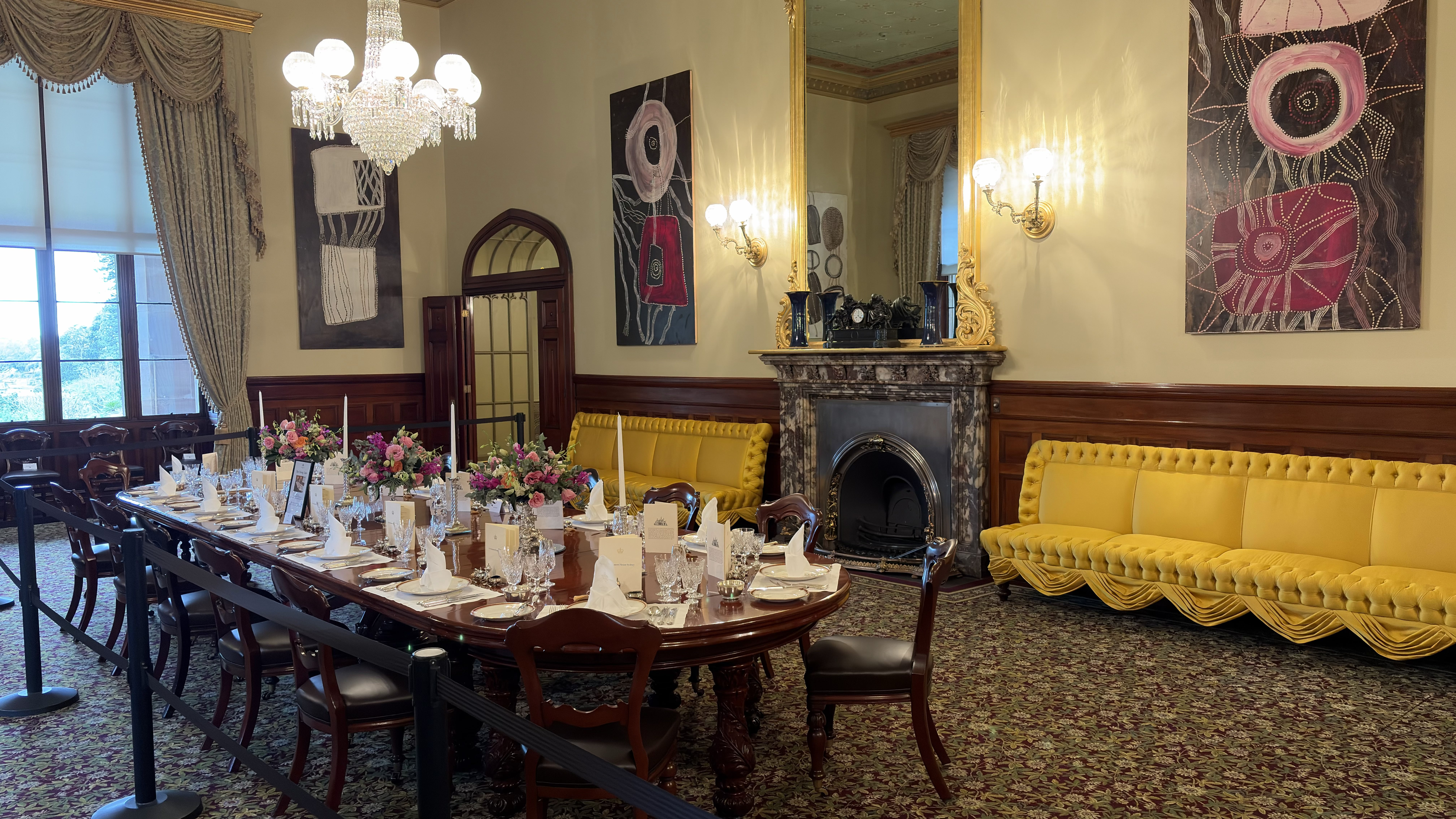
The Dining Room

As at 28 March 2013, Government House built in the early 1840s as the home of the monarch's representative and as the seat of power, symbolised British authority in the colony. Like the Governors themselves, the house is a powerful symbol of state.

From the time of its completion, the house and its occupants were seen as the "pinnacle" of society, and the Governor and family as social exemplars, ideas that continued well into the twentieth century. Home to twenty four governors of New South Wales and their families, and the first five Governors-General, all chosen for their various pre-eminent positions, it reflects the many changes that have taken place in public and private life. Guests and visitors ranged from citizens paying their respects or receiving awards, to the reigning monarch, Elizabeth II, other members of the Royal family and other heads of states.

The finest example of a castellated Gothic house in Australia, the house with its landscaped gardens reflected its English ties and was the model that inspired others. It is a grand ensemble of buildings, gardens and contents whose history and use are richly documented. Developments to the place over 150 years demonstrate changing tastes and social attitudes, and showcase the talents of leading architects, artists and craftsmen.

Located in Governor Phillip's domain, it provides a tangible link with the earliest years of the colony, and is associated with the development of significant public places such as the Conservatorium (formerly its stables), Royal Botanic Gardens (formerly its grounds), and the Opera House.

Government House in Sydney is significant as one of the two original official residences selected for the Governor-General following the federation of the Australian colonies in 1901. Rivalry between New South Wales and Victoria led the Commonwealth Government to designate Government House in Sydney and Melbourne Government House as official residences of equal status for the Governor-General. The Sydney Government House served as the Governor-General's Sydney Residence until 1912 when the NSW government sparked a major controversy by effectively evicting the governor-general. The place is significant for its association with the first five occupants of the high office of Governor-General from the time of federation until 1912.

The house is rare example of a preserved harbourside landscape estate. A typical 19th century 3-part estate landscape of park, parterre and leisure grounds. The formal grounds feature extensive annual displays, manicured lawns, exotic trees and shrubs as well as carriageways, paths and terraces which provide a strong link with Sydney's colonial and Victorian heritage

It is perhaps the last of the great harbourside estates to have survived relatively intact and to still be carrying on its original function; a combination of private residence, office complex and official function venue. The garden is one of the oldest continually maintained gardens in Australia. Whilst it has been altered to some extent over the years, it nevertheless provides an appropriately grand setting for the house.

The heritage significance of Government House at a State level is enhanced by the extraordinarily rich and diverse collection of moveable heritage ranging from furniture, paintings, ceramics, glassware textiles and sculpture to garden ornaments and kitchenalia dating back to the 1820s. It is a rare and intact collection of items with an ongoing and continuous association with the vice regal function and clearly demonstrates 150 years of changing style and taste. The collection is inherently linked to the house (and specific locations in the house). The comprehensive collection of portraits of NSW governors contains one of the earliest official portraits to be commissioned in NSW and Australia, that of Governor Thomas Brisbane by Augustus Earle. The collection of colonial furniture is significant and contains the most extensive collection of furniture by noted craftsman Andrew Lenham between 1845 and 1860 as well as furniture and other objects associated with colonial and international exhibitions and demonstrate excellence in local design, manufacturing and materials.

Government House, Sydney was listed on the New South Wales State Heritage Register on 13 December 2011 having satisfied the following criteria.

The place is important in demonstrating the course, or pattern, of cultural or natural history in New South Wales.

This site replaced the original Government House in 1845 as the seat of power and the symbol of the Crown and British authority in the colonial period. It was the seat of executive power under the constitution of New South Wales from 1856 to 1901 and 1915 to 1996. It can demonstrate its changing role as the seat of executive power, the residence of the Governors of New South Wales, and as an important place of State ceremony.

The place has a strong or special association with a person, or group of persons, of importance of cultural or natural history of New South Wales's history.

The site has close associations with the many Governors and Governors-General who have resided there as well as the many international heads of state who have visited and stayed there. As the seat of British authority in NSW and Australia, Government House is significant for its important association with the British royalty, especially those who have been accommodated at the house including Prince Alfred (who after being shot was treated and nursed back to health in the Drawing Room of Government House), Queen Elizabeth the Queen Mother, King Charles III (then Prince of Wales), Princess Diana, Princess Anne and Captain Mark Phillips and significantly Queen Elizabeth II and her husband the Duke of Edinburgh on a number of occasions. The historic significance of Government House is also enhanced through its association with those involved in its design and construction: Edward Blore, an eminent British architect who completed the original design of the house; Colonial Architect Mortimer Lewis who adapted these plans to suit Australian conditions; James Barney who designed and supervised significant repairs and alterations to the house; and Walter Liberty Vernon who was also responsible for significant additions and repairs.

The place is important in demonstrating aesthetic characteristics and/or a high degree of creative or technical achievement in New South Wales.

The quality of Edward Blore's design and detailing, and the degree to which his intent was realised in the finished house, resulted in a unique building for the colony. It remains the finest example of a castellated Gothic House in Australia. The Gothic style of the house and the character of its landscaped gardens were perceived to be quintessentially English and calculated to maintain the emotional ties between a distant colony and the motherland. It served as an inspiration for other Gothic buildings in Sydney including harbourside villas, and was also a model for the unrealised Government House in Hobart. Furthermore, it was an impetus for the Gothic revival in Australia. The construction of such a large and sophisticated building was a major technical achievement for the time. It had a seminal influence in raising the standards of building and craftsmanship in the colony. The additions to the house by James Barnet and Walter. L. Vernon between 1870 and 1902, were notable examples of the later Victorian Gothic revival style. The Chalet is a fine example of an Arts and Crafts inspired style of domestic architecture and a forerunner of the Australian Federation style of the early 20th century.

The place has a strong or special association with a particular community or cultural group in New South Wales for social, cultural or spiritual reasons.

The house was seen as a pinnacle of society and the roll of Governor as social "exemplar", ideas that continued well into the 20th century. The place can demonstrate the changing emphasis in the selection of governor; from military, to career administrators, to aristocrats. By the end of the 19th century the role was perceived to be more social than political, and post-war Australian governors were installed into this esteemed position. At each stage in its history, Government House was a place of work for personnel involved in the business of the Governor, in domestic service, in securing the site, or in the keeping of the grounds, most being resident on the site. The role of domestic servants, and later domestic staff, continued until the mid 1990s, well after such service had become anachronistic in most other great houses in Australia.

The place has potential to yield information that will contribute to an understanding of the cultural or natural history of New South Wales.

Government House demonstrates at a high level the design, layout, construction techniques and finishes of a colonial grand house in the Gothic style as well as that of an early colonial harbour-side estate charged with the carriage of viceregal functions including symbolic functions of authority in polity and society. The ensemble of House, outbuildings and gardens can demonstrate the development of the site and its functions from the colonial period to today. The Government house interiors as they have evolved from the 1840s reflect the development of taste and style over 170 years. The Government House garden has the archaeological potential to provide information on early roads and drives and terrace arrangements. The important interiors (such as the Lyon and Cottier wall Drawing Room ceilings and hand painted cloth panels) and the extensive moveable heritage collection (including the collection of Colonial Australian furniture, portraits of Governors, and some of the more recent furnishings and fittings) demonstrate 150 years of changing style and taste.

The place possesses uncommon, rare or endangered aspects of the cultural or natural history of New South Wales.

It is a rare surviving example where the original and early planning remains relatively intact and demonstrates the prevailing social order and domestic arrangements of the "place".

== Gallery ==
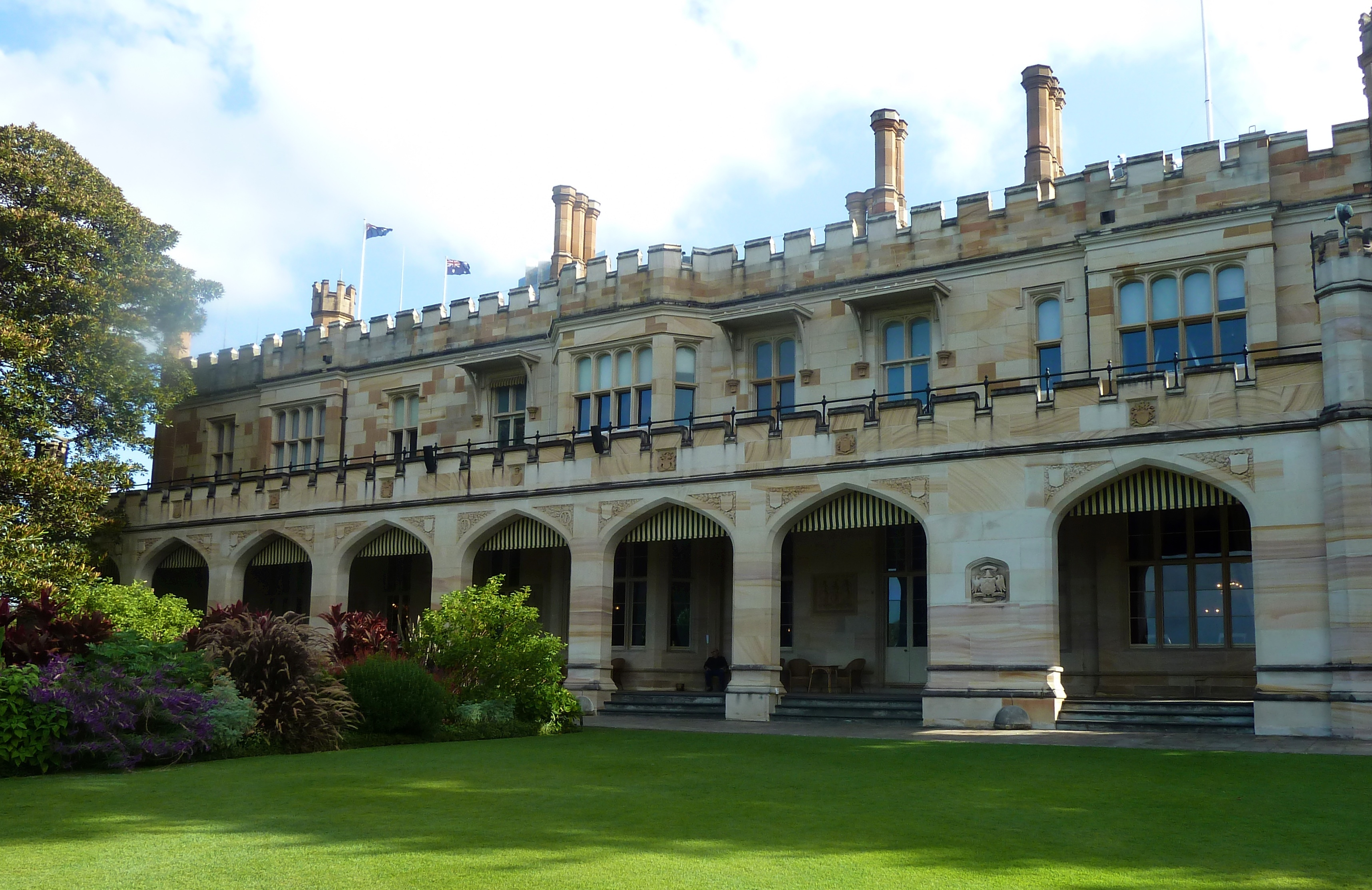
The eastern façade

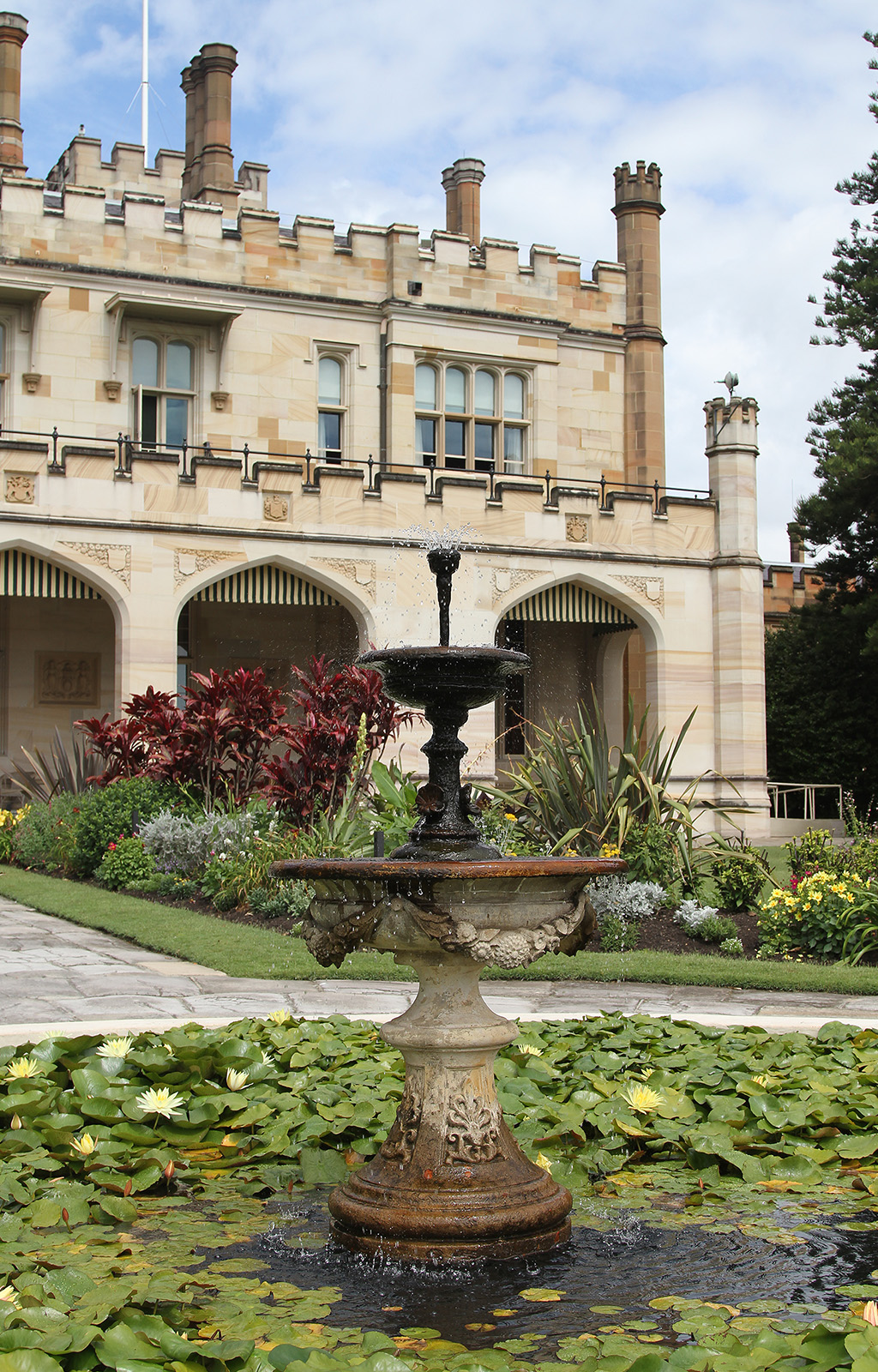
Water fountain in the formal gardens on the eastern side of Government House.

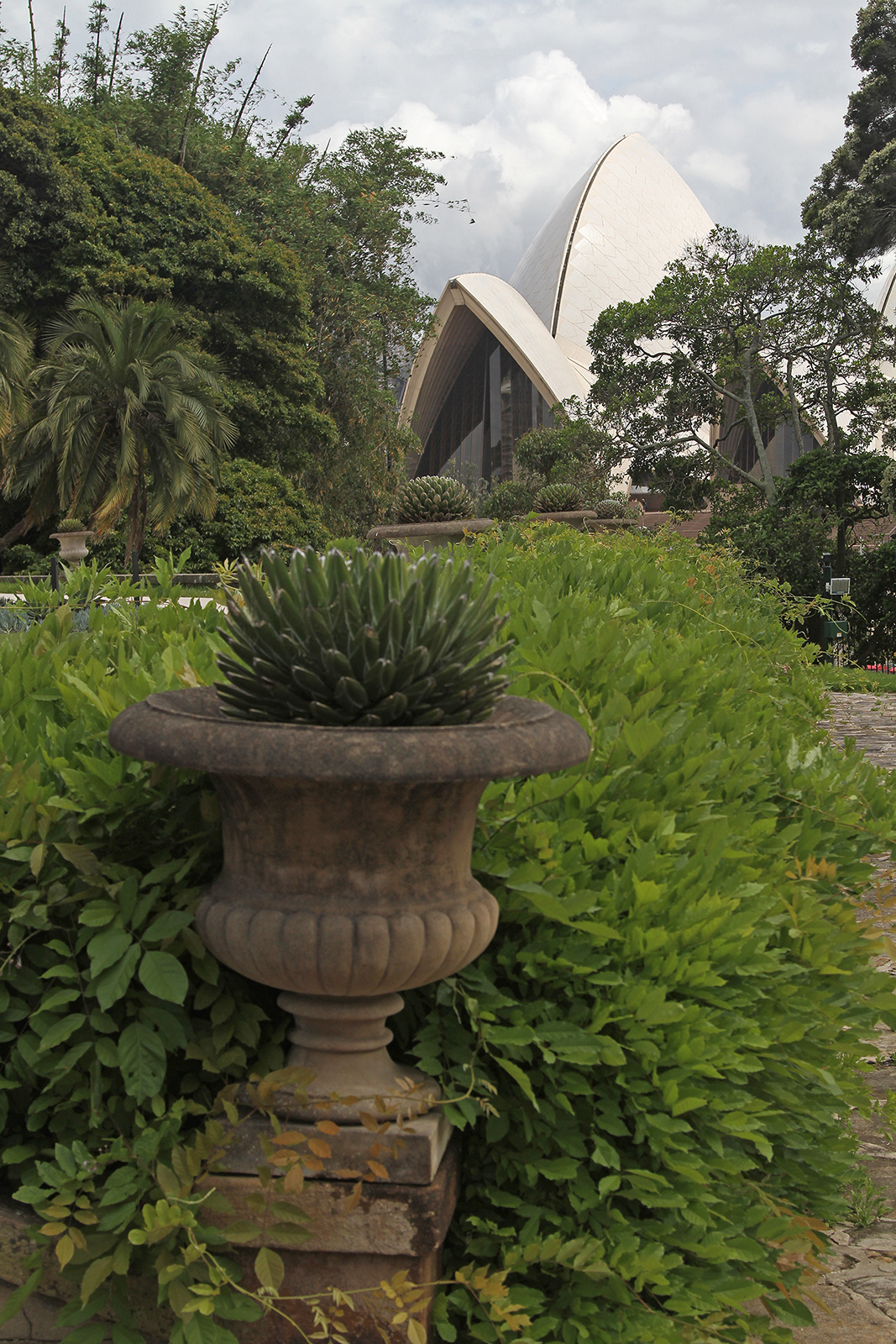
Garden features in the formal gardens on the eastern side of the house, with views across to Sydney Opera House.

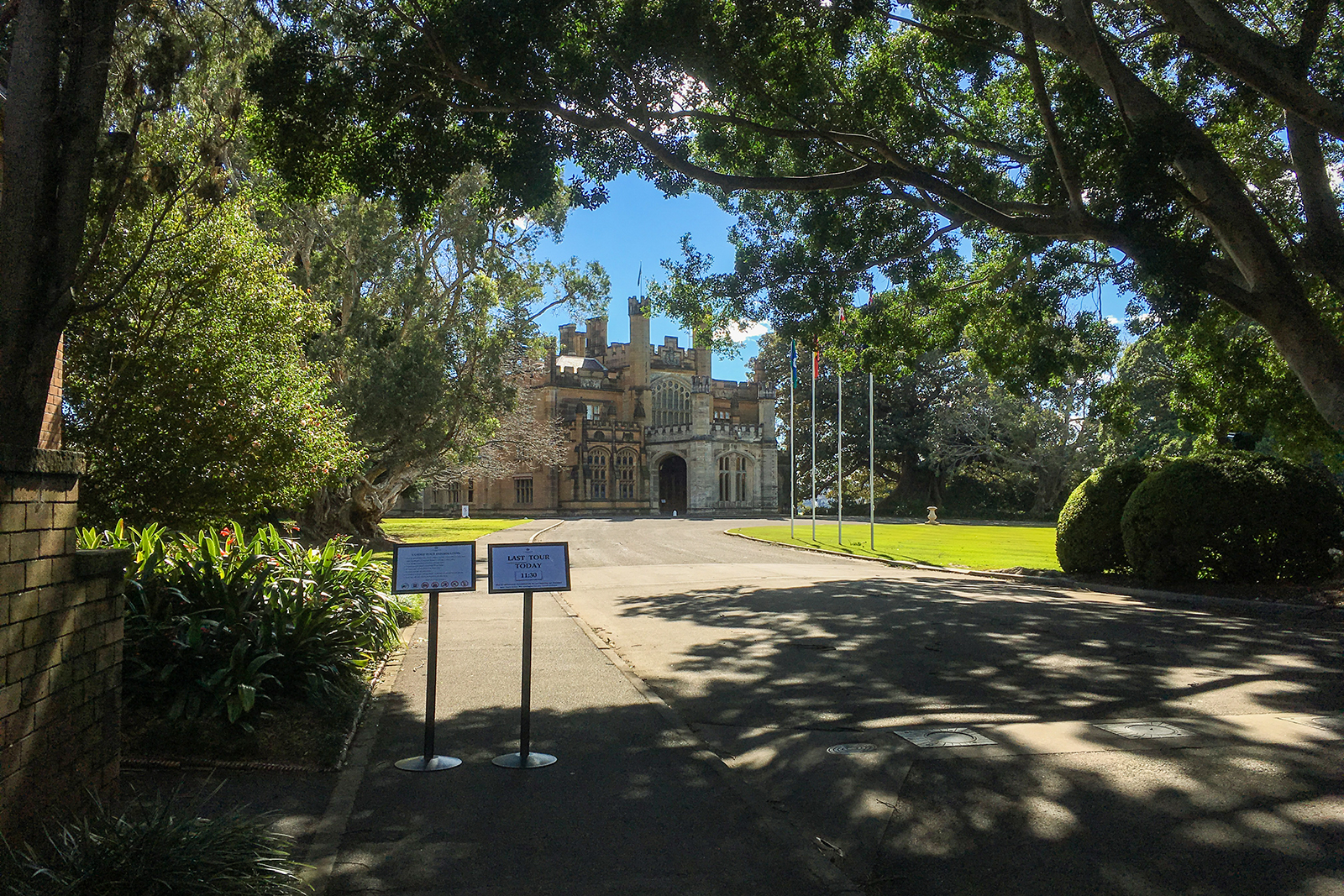
Formal gateway and entrance drive to Government House, Sydney.

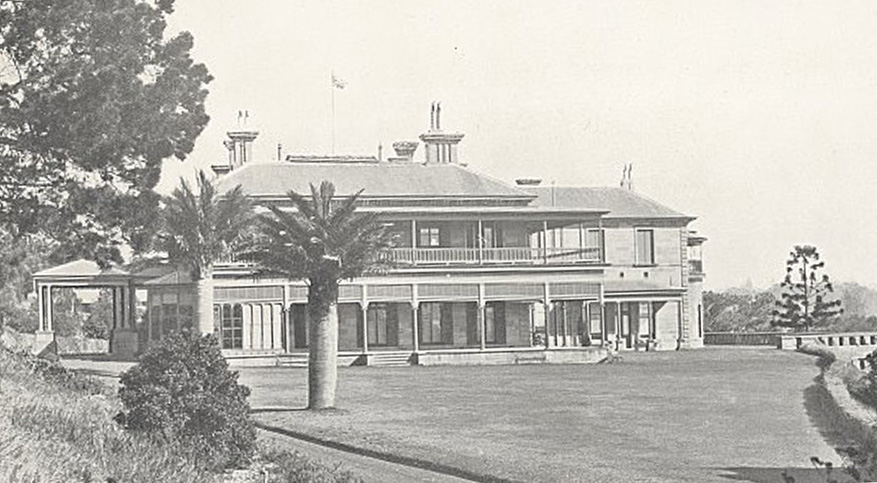
Cranbook, 1917.

Government House as sketched in 1848

== See also ==
- First Government House, Sydney, residence of the Governor from 1788 to 1845
- Old Government House, Parramatta, the country retreat for the early Governors
- Government Houses of Australia
- Government Houses in the Commonwealth
- Government House Sydney 360° Virtual Tour
