= Government House, Melbourne =

Official residence of the governor of Victoria

Government House
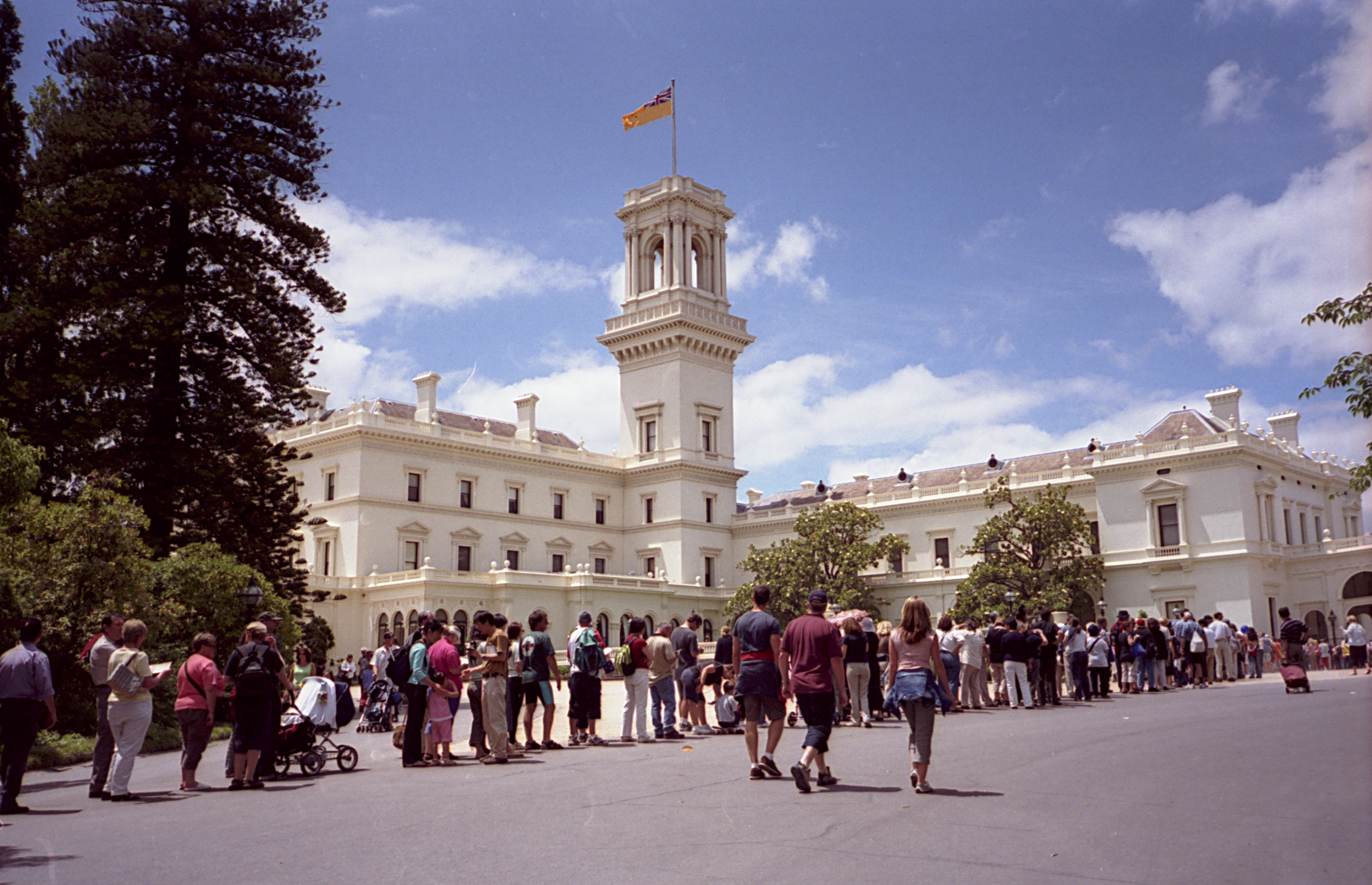
- Main façade of Government House
- Interactive map of the Government House area

General information
- Status: Completed
- Type: Vice-regal residence
- Architectural style: Italianate
- Location: Kings Domain, 1 Government House Drive, Melbourne, Victoria, Australia
- Coordinates: 37°49′41″S 144°58′37″E
- Construction started: 1871
- Completed: 1876
- Owner: Government of Victoria

Design and construction
- Architect: William Wardell

Other information
- Public transit access: Grant St-Police Memorial/St Kilda Rd (#17): 3, 5, 6, 16, 64, 67, 72

Website
- Government House Garden and Grounds

Victorian Heritage Register
- Official name: Government House Complex
- Type: State Registered Place
- Designated: 20 August 1982
- Reference no.: H1620
- Heritage Overlay number: HO397

Government House is the official residence of the governor of Victoria, currently Margaret Gardner. It is located in Kings Domain, Melbourne, next to the Royal Botanic Gardens.

Government House was opened in 1876, on land that had originally been set aside in 1841. Previous governors' residences included La Trobe's Cottage (1839–1854), Toorak House (1854–1874), and Bishopscourt (1874–1876). It was designed by William Wardell in the Italianate style, and modelled to some extent on Queen Victoria's Osborne House residence, to which it bears a strong resemblance. Between 1901 and 1930, Government House was used as the official residence of the governor-general of Australia. This occurred during the period when Canberra was still under construction and Melbourne was designated as the temporary seat of government. Despite Parliament House opening in 1927, the governor-general did not permanently move to Yarralumla for another three years, at which point Government House was given back to the Victorian government.

== History ==
A large area of land south of the Yarra River was set aside by Lieutenant-Governor of Victoria Charles La Trobe in the early 1840s, with part intended for the Royal Botanic Gardens, and the hilltop area for a Government House. A competition in 1853 produced a winning design by Knight & Kerr in Elizabethan style, but was not proceeded with. In 1857, Ferdinand von Mueller, Director of the Gardens, landscaped the whole area as one parkland. Another competition in 1864 was won by Reed & Barnes in Italianate style, but was also not proceeded with.

Eventually a building supervised by the chief architect of the Public Works Department, William Wardell, in a grand Italianate manner, was built between 1871 and 1876.

While La Trobe was lieutenant-governor he lived in La Trobe's Cottage. Between 1854 and 1874, governors lived at Toorak House, in the suburb named after it, then briefly at Bishopscourt in East Melbourne until the present Government House was occupied in 1876.

Between the formation of the Commonwealth of Australia in 1901 and 1927, Government House was the official residence of the governor-general of Australia. When the Federal Parliament commenced sitting in Canberra in 1927, the governor-general stayed at Government House, Canberra, at Yarralumla while Parliament was in session, but also continued living at Government House in Melbourne until 1930. During this period Governors of Victoria lived at Stonington mansion. The House has been in continuous use by the governors of Victoria since 1934.

== Building design ==
Government House design was supervised by William Wardell, Inspector General of the Public Works Department, with drawings by John James Clark, in the Victorian period Italianate style, and is reminiscent of Queen Victoria's summer residence on the Isle of Wight, Osborne House. The building reflects the optimism of the period, with an economy still growing fast twenty years after the Victorian gold rush.

The main building consists of three parts: the south wing with its extravagant single storey State Ballroom, the formal State rooms, and smaller dining and drawing rooms to the north. Rising from the building is a 145-foot belvedere tower. The mews — a paved area surrounded on three sides by stables and coach houses is nearby.

The garden was designed by John Sayce in 1873 and is thought to be the "most intact 19th century mansion garden remaining in Melbourne" by the Victorian Heritage Register. William Guilfoyle, curator of the Melbourne Botanic Gardens, further refined the original garden design with "many fine mature trees, including conifers, Australian rainforest species and deciduous trees, which are characteristic of the era and which also reflect Guilfoyle’s personal taste.".

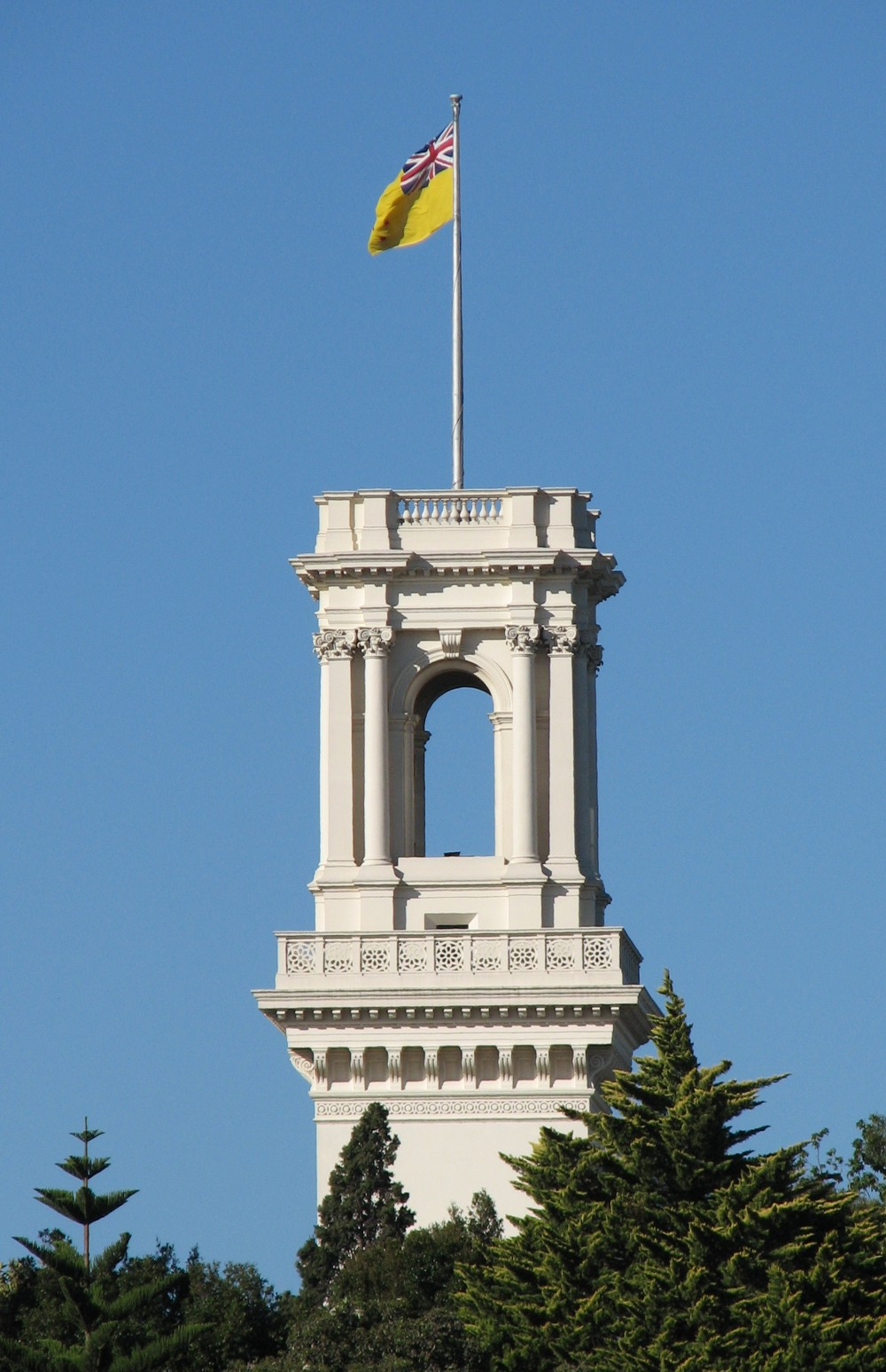
The belvedere tower of Government House with the flag of the governor of Victoria raised

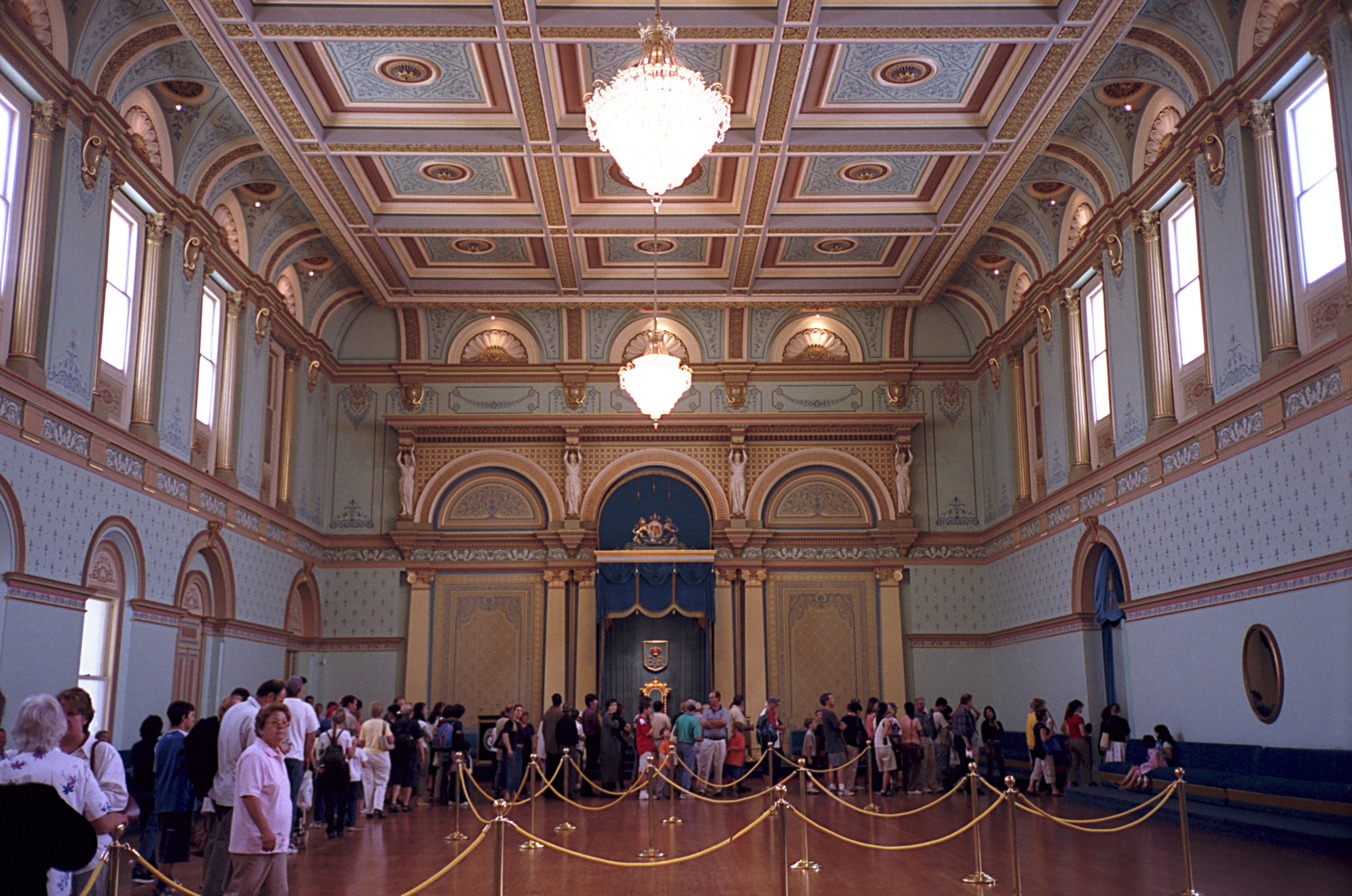
The State Ballroom was once reputed to be the largest in the British Empire.

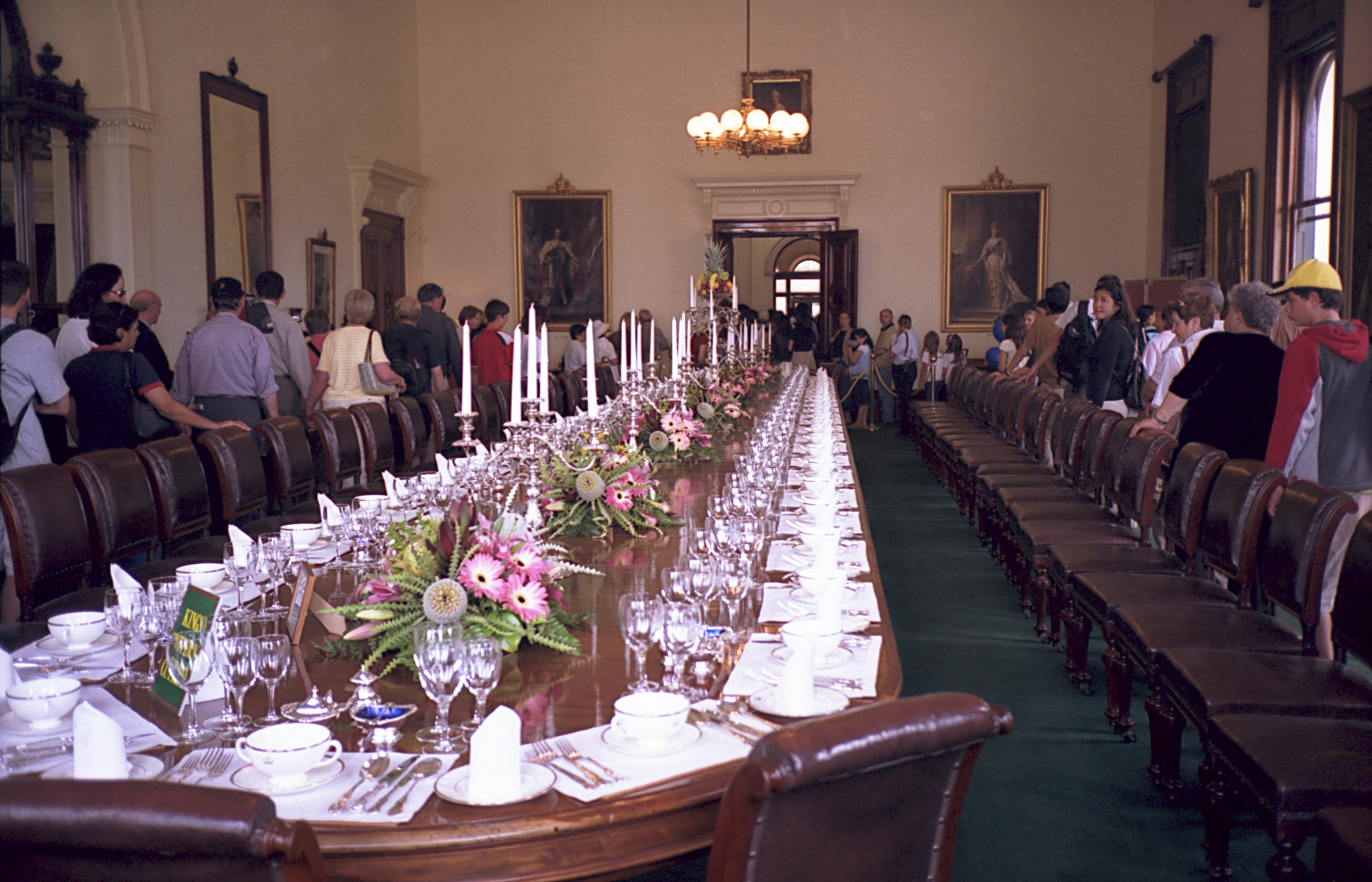
The table of the State Dining Room sits 54 people.

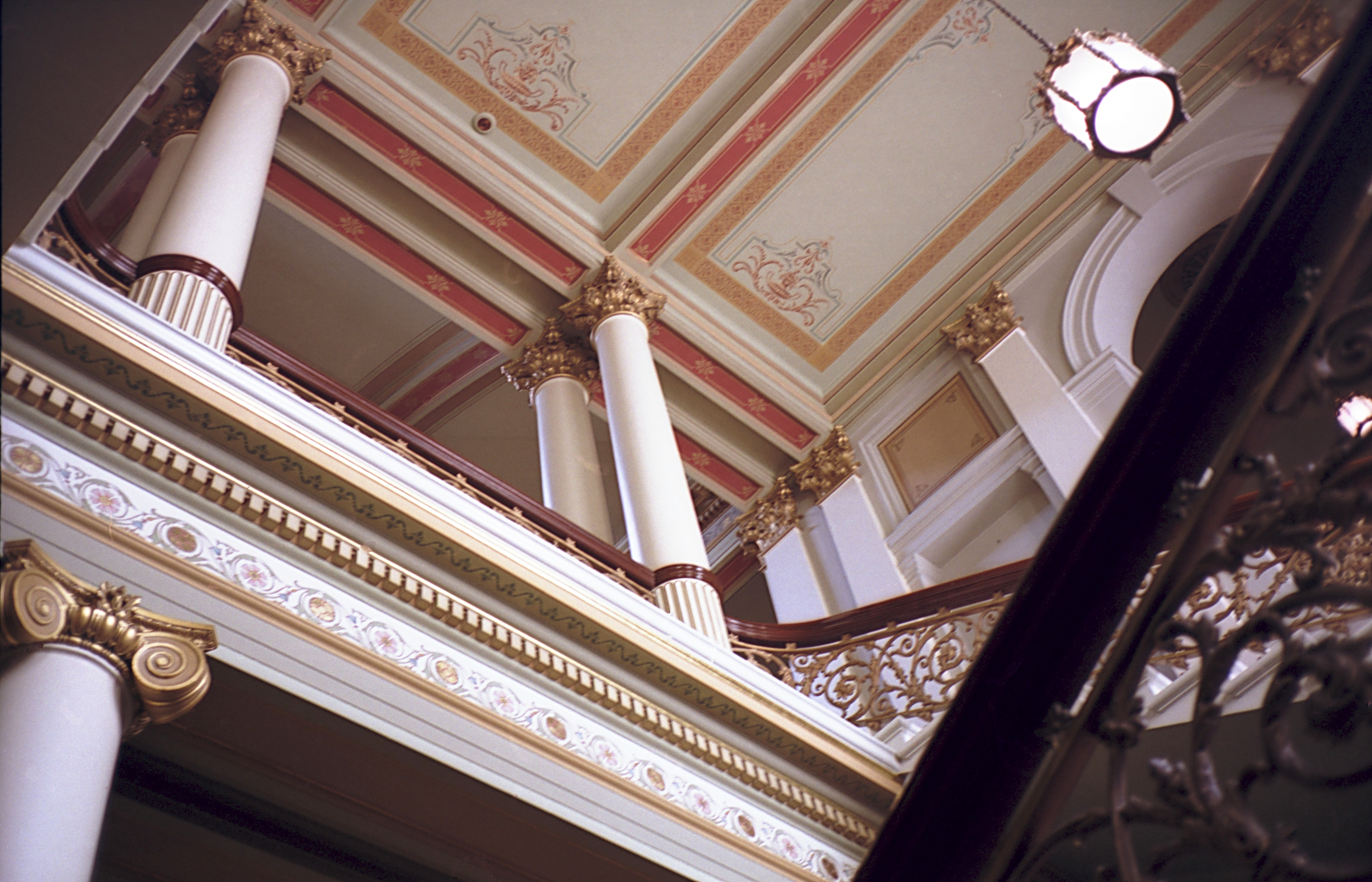
The interior of Government House is decorated in the neoclassical style.

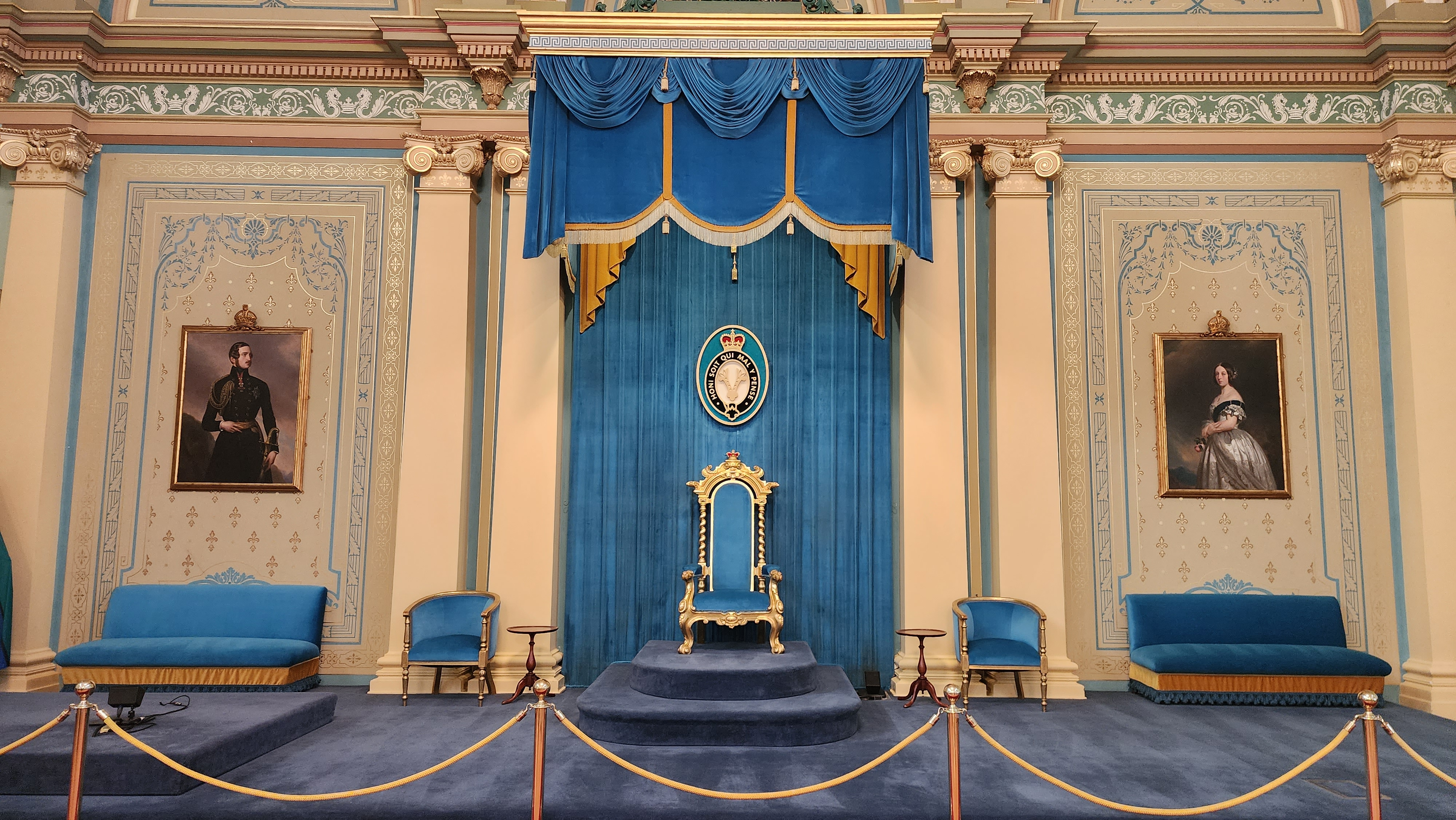
Seating area

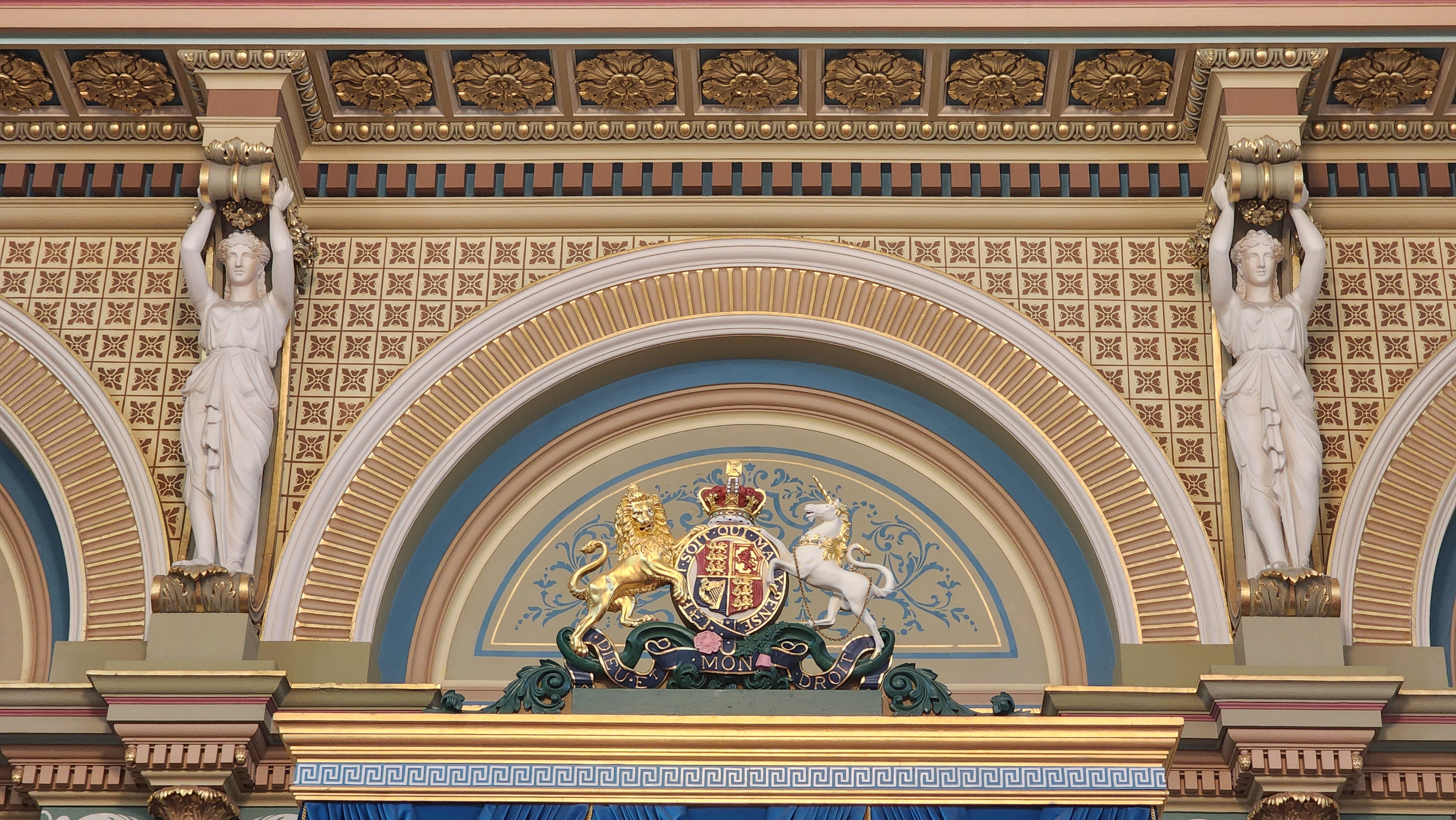
The emblem above the seating area

== See also ==
- William Wardell, Government House, Melbourne.
- Government House
- Governor of Victoria
- Governor-General of Australia
- Government Houses of Australia
- Government Houses in the Commonwealth
