= Toorak House =

Mansion in Melbourne, Australia

Coordinates: 37.839153°S 145.018115°E

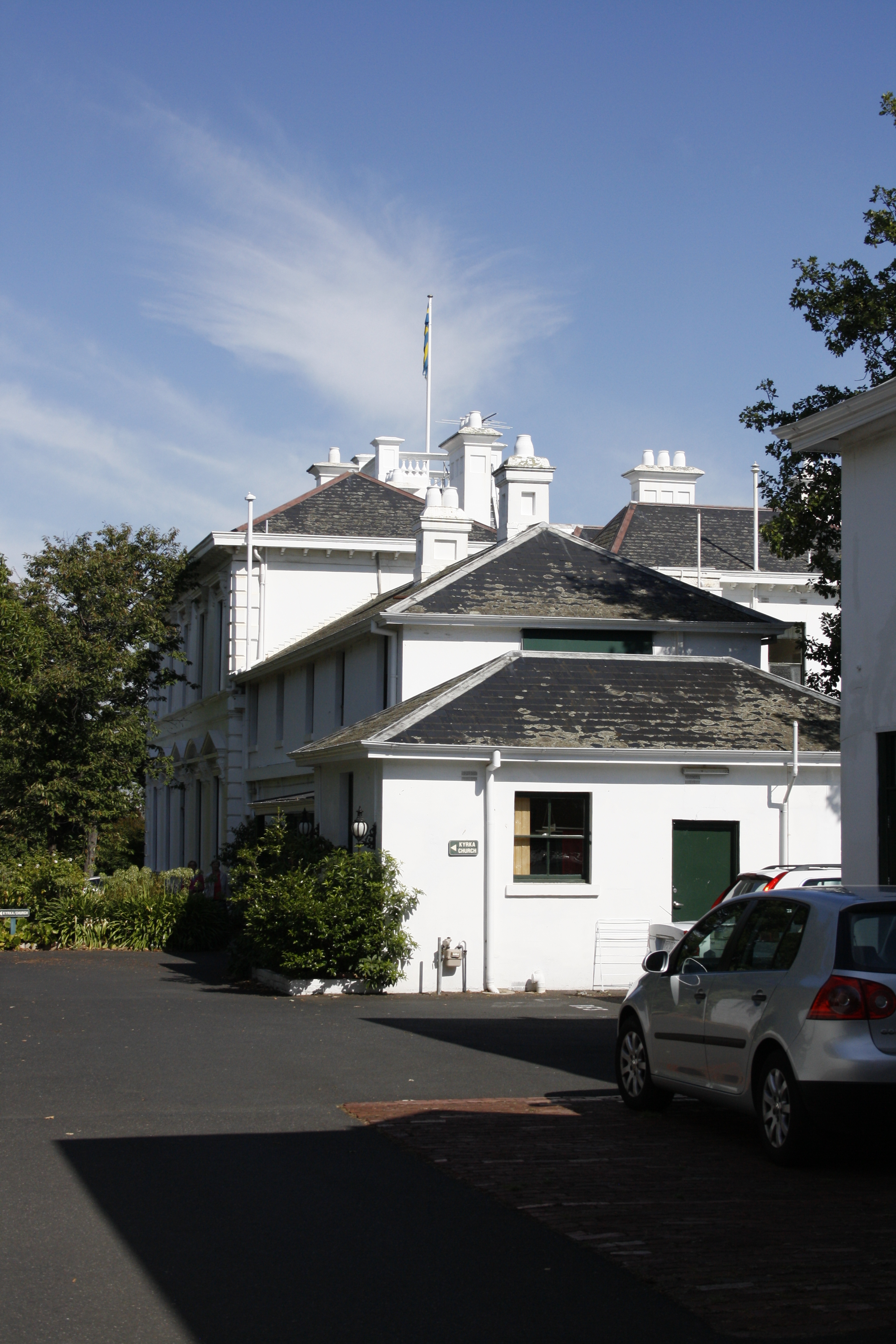
- Interactive map of the Toorak House area

General information
- Type: House
- Architectural style: Victorian Italianate
- Location: 21 St Georges Road, Toorak, Melbourne, Victoria, Australia
- Current tenants: Church of Sweden abroad
- Construction started: 1848
- Completed: 1851
- Client: James Jackson

Design and construction
- Architect: Samuel Jackson

Victorian Heritage Register
- Official name: Toorak House
- Type: Natural and cultural heritage register
- Designated: 9 October 1974
- Reference no.: H0207

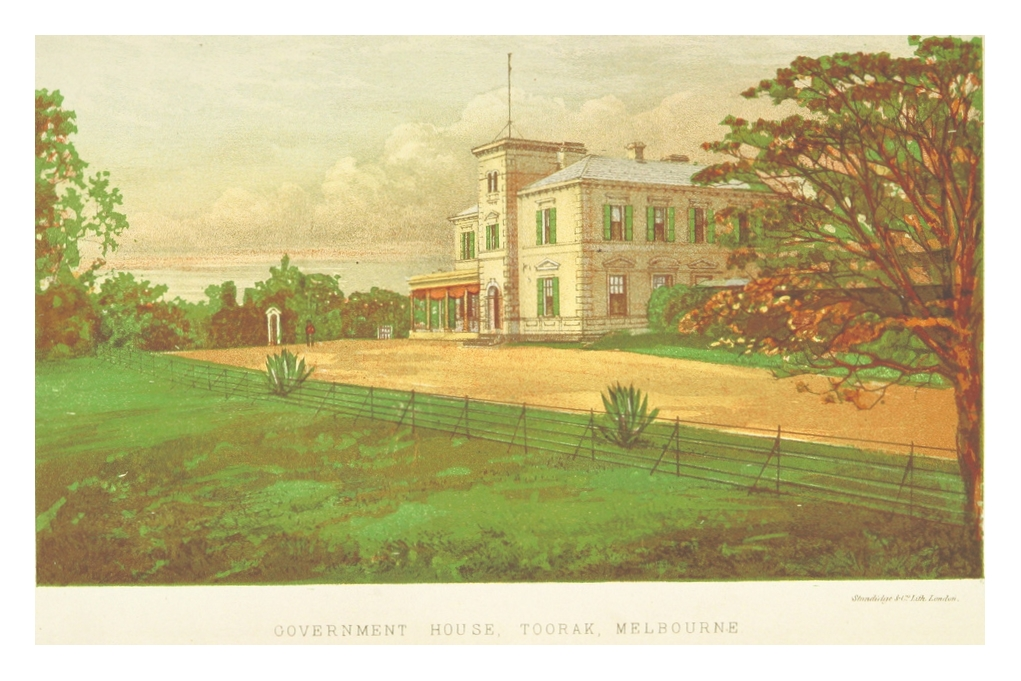
Residence Toorak House - 1869

Toorak House is a mansion located in Melbourne, Australia built in 1849 by well-known Melbourne merchant James Jackson. It is notable for its use as Melbourne's first Government House and having inspired the name for the suburb of Toorak.

Jackson is believed to have borrowed from Woiwurrung language, with words of similar pronunciation, meaning either black crow or reedy swamp.

Toorak House is owned by the Church of Sweden abroad. The Swedish Church and Cafe and Shop is open for visitors daily except on Mondays and Wednesdays.

== History ==
Toorak House was built in 1849 by well-known Melbourne merchant James Jackson and designed by Samuel Jackson in the Italianate Victorian architecture style.

When Jackson died at sea in 1851, it was leased by his widow to the Victorian government in 1854 for official use by the first Governor of Victoria, Captain Sir Charles Hotham KCB RN and four of his successors until 1874—Sir Henry Barkly GCMG KCB, Sir Charles Darling KCB, John Manners-Sutton, 3rd Viscount Canterbury and Sir George Bowen PC GCMG.

The considerable property comprised 47 hectares bounded by Toorak Road, Orrong Road, both sides of St. Georges Road and the Yarra River, with a grand entrance driveway running northwards from Toorak Road.

In 1874 lease renegotiations to enable the Governor to continue to reside at Toorak House, until the new Government House in Kings Domain was completed, broke down.

Jackson's sons, now back in England, decided instead to sell the property to the Bendigo goldmining magnate, the so-called "Quartz King," George Lansell.

Already possessing the considerable 20-hectare Fortuna Villa in Bendigo, to which he had an historical attachment, and a two-hectare townhouse on St. Kilda Road, Melbourne, the ever entrepreneurial Lansell decided to subdivide the property into 137 allotments of varying sizes. Hence the new street names, Lansell Road and St. Georges Road (his little jest).

All the properties were marketed to Melbourne's mainly newly wealthy élite, as "specially for the gentry of Victoria," and put up for auction on November 14 and 16, 1874.

Still, another temporary residence needed to be found for Governor Bowen. Bishopscourt, the official residence of Melbourne's bishops and Archbishops, in East Melbourne was then commandeered for this purpose before the present Government House was finally finished and occupied in 1876.

The much diminished property reverted to being a private home in 1876, and was used as a Women's Auxiliary Australian Air Force hostel during World War II. In 1956 it was purchased by the Church of Sweden, which converted the property into a church and community centre.

Exterior shots of the property and grounds have featured in several Australian films and TV drama serials. Toorak House was used as the location for Godfrey Carson House in the period drama Carson's Law, and as the South Yarra/Toorak mansion inherited by Patricia Hamilton in Sons and Daughters.

== See also ==
- Architecture of Melbourne
