= Amphibians of Australia =

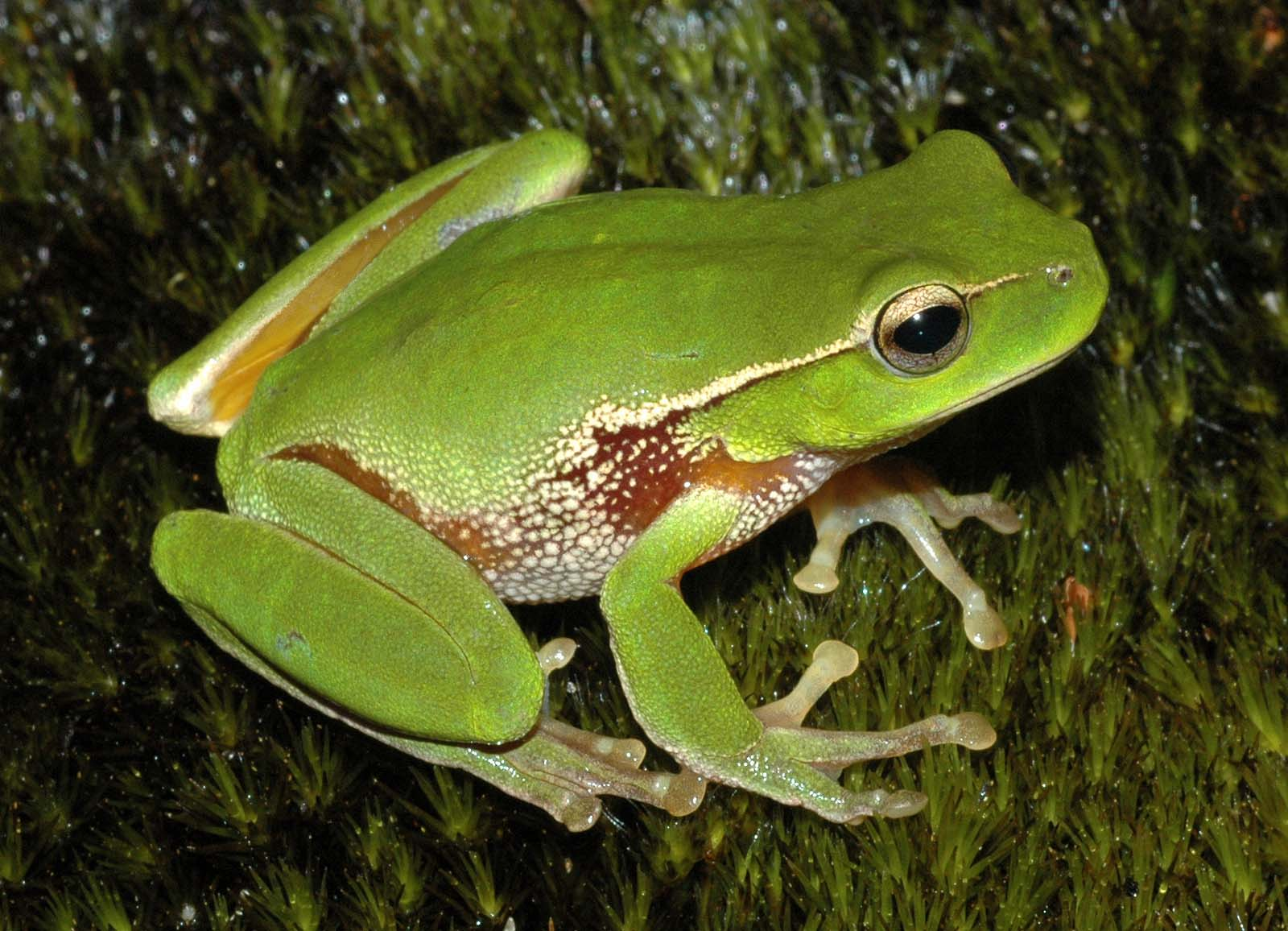
The leaf green tree frog (Dryopsophus phyllochrous) is a species of tree frog common to forests of eastern Australia.

Amphibians of Australia are limited to members of the order Anura, commonly known as frogs. All Australian frogs are in the suborder Neobatrachia, also known as the modern frogs, which make up the largest proportion of extant frog species. About 230 of the 5,280 species of frog are native to Australia with 93% of them endemic. Compared with other continents, species diversity is low, and may be related to the climate of most of the Australian continent. There are two known invasive amphibians, the cane toad and the smooth newt.

== Origins ==
The Australian continent once formed part of the supercontinent Pangaea, which split into Gondwana and Laurasia approximately 180 million years ago. The earliest true frog fossil, Vieraella herbsti, is dated between 188 and 213 million years old, predating this split. This has resulted in frogs being present on all continents.

The first two continents to split from Australia were South America and Africa. The amphibian fauna of both these continents are varied due to collisions with Laurasian continents. However, the South African family Heleophrynidae, and the South American family Leptodactylidae, are both closely related to Myobatrachidae, an Australian family of ground dwelling frogs.

Fossil data suggests the tree frogs of the family Pelodryadidae originated in South America after its separation from Africa. Outside Australia, the tree frog family Hylidae are widespread throughout much of North, Europe and Asia. Pelodryadid tree frogs presumably migrated to Australia via Antarctica. Similarities in melanosomes between Pelodryadidae and Phyllomedusidae suggests a relationship between the South American and Australian tree frogs, however immunological evidence suggests an early divergence between the families.

India, Madagascar and Seychelles split from Gondwana approximately 130 million years ago. The family Sooglossidae is native to both India and the Seychelles, and is considered a sister taxon to Myobatrachidae. Sooglossidae is more closely related to Myobatrachidae than the African or South American families.

Australia and New Guinea are the two major land masses which make up the Australian continent. During its history, there have been many land connections between New Guinea and Australia. The most recent of which severed 10,000 years ago during the transition from a glacial period to the current interglacial period. The result of this recent land connection on the Australian amphibian fauna has been the swapping of species, and even families. The origin of the frog species found on both land masses can be determined by their distributions. It is likely that White's tree frog (Pelodryas caerulea) migrated from Australia to New Guinea, as it is widespread in Australia and only inhabits small areas within New Guinea. Whereas the giant tree frog (Sandyrana infrafrenata) is likely from New Guinea, as it is widespread in New Guinea, and only inhabits the Cape York Peninsula in Australia.

There are two families which are widely distributed throughout the Northern Hemisphere which only inhabit far northern Australia: Microhylidae and Ranidae. Two of the 59 genera of Microhylidae and only one of approximately 460 species of Ranidae are native to the Australian mainland (a further two genera of Microhylid are found on Dauan Island in the Torres Strait). Although both these families are widely distributed throughout the world, they have only recently reached Australia and New Guinea. This is because the Australian continent has remained isolated since its separation from Antarctica, and as it has drifted north towards Asia, many species have been able to cross into New Guinea, and eventually Australia. However, most of the ecological niches filled by frogs had been filled before the ranids and microhylids reached Australia, so only a limited number of species have established.

== Distribution ==
The distribution of Australian frogs is largely influenced by climate. The areas of largest biodiversity occur in the tropical and temperate zones of northern and eastern Australia. Arid areas have restricted amphibian biodiversity, as frogs generally require water to breed. Many Australian frog species have adapted to deal with the harsh conditions of their habitat. Many species, such as those of the genus Cyclorana, burrow underground to avoid heat and prolonged drought conditions. Tadpole and egg development of frogs from arid regions differs from those from higher rainfall regions. Some species, such as those of Cyclorana and other desert dwelling species have relatively short tadpole development periods. These species often breed in temporary, shallow pools where the high water temperature speeds up tadpole development. Tadpoles that live in such pools can complete development within a month. On the other hand, species such as those in the genus Mixophyes live in areas of high rainfall. Metamorphosis of Mixophyes tadpoles may take as long as fifteen months. The sandhill frog (Arenophryne rotunda) lives in sand dunes between Shark Bay and Kalbarri National Park in Western Australia. This area has very little free-standing water and therefore this species has adapted another way of tadpole development. Sandhill frogs lay their eggs under the sand and the tadpoles develop into frogs entirely within the egg. This adaptation allows them to breed with the absence of water.

There are large variety of habitats inhabited by Australian frogs. Variations in rainfall, temperature, altitude and latitude have resulted in a large number of habitats in Australia, most of which are inhabited by frogs. In the Nullarbor Plain, daytime temperatures can reach 48.5 °C nights can have freezing condition and rainfall is less than 200 mm per year. These factors make it very difficult for frogs to survive, and few species are found in this area.

== Conservation ==
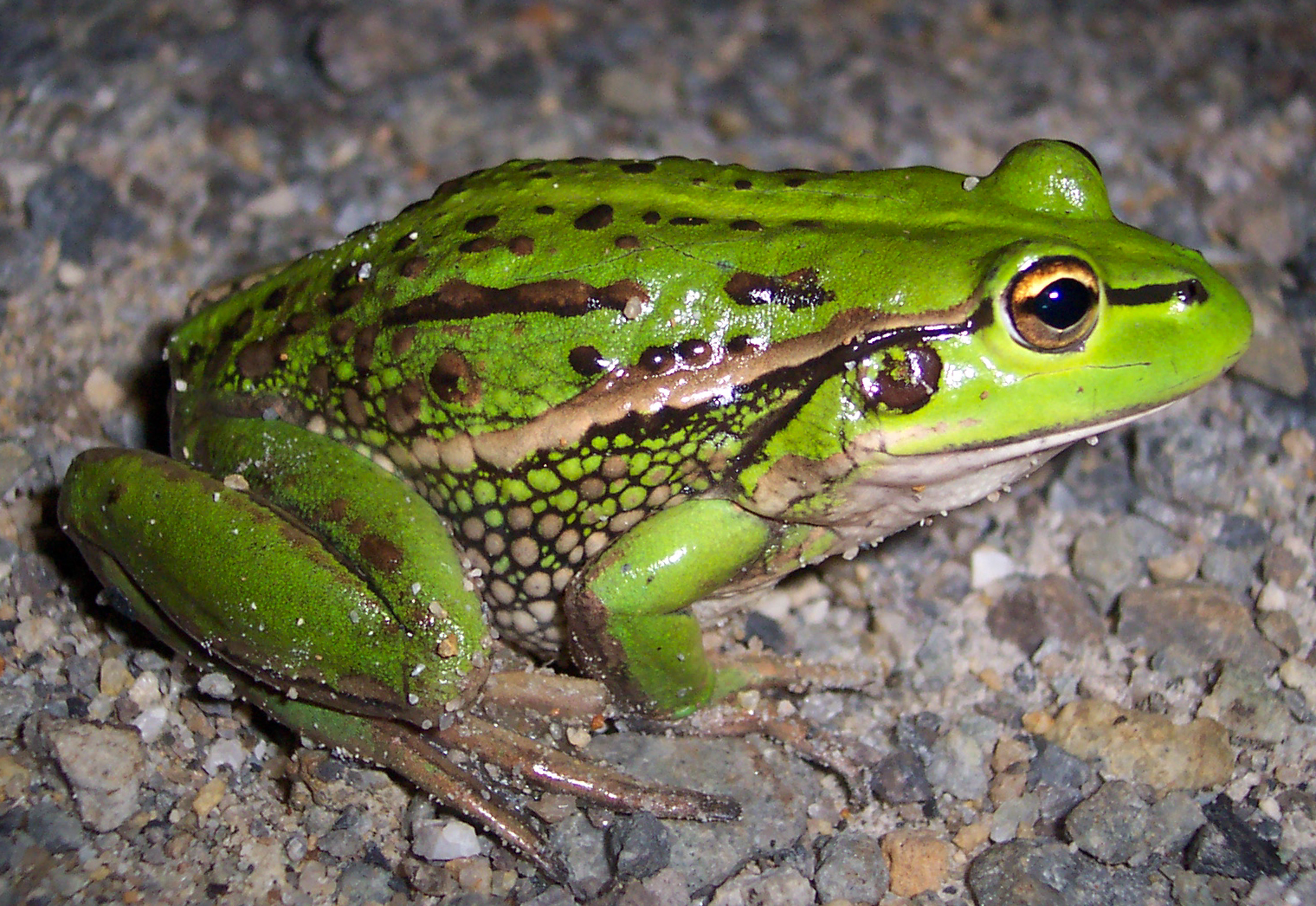
The growling grass frog (Litoria raniformis) is listed as endangered because of an estimated 50% population decline over the past 10 years.

During the 1980s, population declines were reported in Australian frog species and are severe in some areas. Many of the frogs that were reported as declining were high altitude, creek dwelling species that were remote from a changing ecology. This indicated that habitat loss and degradation were not responsible for all the declines; the cause is unknown but a diseases known as chytrid fungus may be a factor. In some cases entire genera were found declining. Both species of gastric brooding frog are now classified as extinct and all but two species of Taudactylus are critically endangered (Taudactylus diurnus is classified as extinct and Taudactylus liemi is classified as near threatened). Every species in the genus Philoria is currently declining and some species in the "torrent frog" complex (Litoria nannotis, Litoria lorica, Litoria nyakalensis and Litoria rheocola) have not been located for a number of years.

In 2006, three Australian species of frog were classified as extinct, 14 listed as critically endangered and 18 as endangered. Of the 14 critically endangered species 4 had not been recorded for over 15 years and may then have been extinct. As of March 2025, four species of Australian frogs were classified as extinct, 18 critically endangered, 15 endangered and 16 vulnerable under the EPBC Act.

Prior to the large scale declines of the 1980s, habitat destruction was the major threat to Australian frog species since colonisation. For example, the decline of the giant burrowing frog (Heleioporus australiacus) was mostly attributed to altered land use and fire regimes, such as land clearing for housing or agriculture and high intensity fires. The distribution of the giant burrowing frog included Sydney, and therefore, large populations were destroyed.

=== Extinct frogs ===
- Rheobatrachus silus — southern gastric-brooding frog — last seen 1981
- Rheobatrachus vitellinus — northern gastric-brooding frog — last seen 1985
- Taudactylus acutirostris — sharp-snouted day frog
- Taudactylus diurnus — Mount Glorious torrent frog — last seen 1979

=== Critically endangered frogs ===
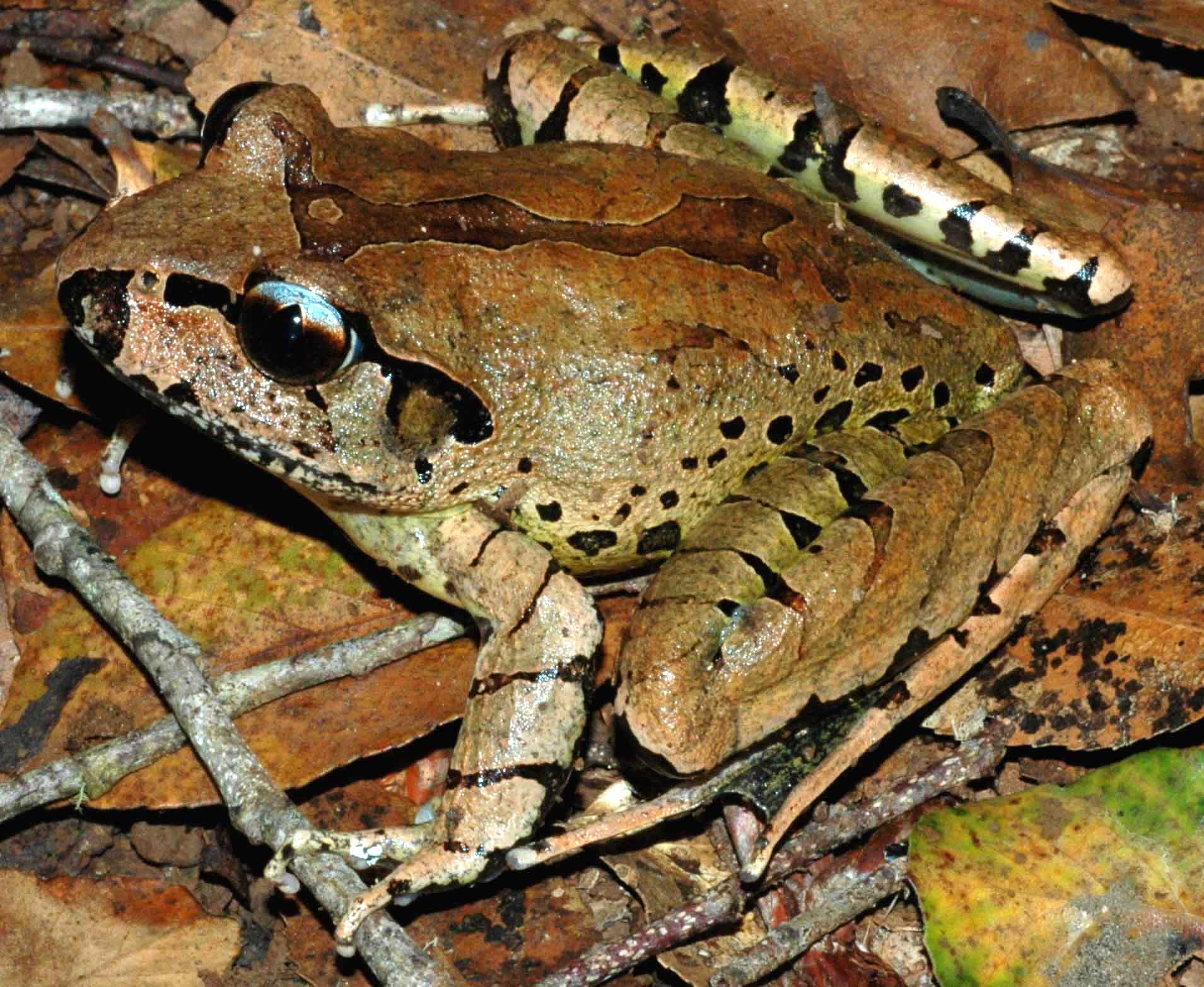
Fleay's barred frog (Mixophyes fleayi) is restricted to a fragmented range of less than 500 km^{2}; this species is classified as endangered.

- Assa wollumbin — Wollumbin pouched frog
- Cophixalus concinnus — elegant frog
- Cophixalus mcdonaldi — McDonald's frog
- Dryopsophus piperata — peppered tree frog* — last confirmed sighting 1973, similar frogs discovered in 1992
- Dryopsophus spenceri — spotted tree frog
- Geocrinia alba — white-bellied frog
- Mosleyia lorica — armoured frog — rediscovered 2008 after not being seen for about 15 years
- Mosleyia nyakalensis — Nyakala frog* — last seen 1990
- Philoria frosti — Baw Baw frog — as few as 250 adults left in the wild
- Pseudophryne corroboree — corroboree frog — as few as 250 adults left in the wild
- Ranoidea castanea — yellow-spotted bell frog — rediscovered in 2009 after not being seen for 30 years
- Rhyaconastes booroolongensis — Booroolong frog
- Spicicalyx myola — myola tree frog
- Taudactylus eungellensis — Eungella torrent frog
- Taudactylus pleione — Kroombit tinker frog
- Taudactylus rheophilus — tinkling frog* — last seen in 2000

=== Endangered frogs ===
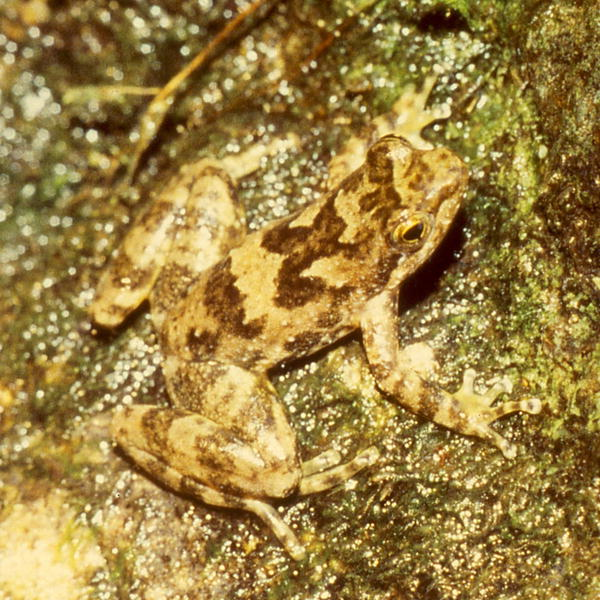
The Eungella torrent frog (Taudactylus eungellensis) is listed as endangered because of its small geographic range of 10 km^{2}.

- Cophixalus monticola — mountain nursery frog
- Cophixalus neglectus — neglected frog
- Dryomantis cooloolensis — Cooloolah tree frog
- Eremnoculus dayi — Australian lace-lid
- Mixophyes fleayi — Fleay's barred frog
- Mixophyes iteratus — giant barred frog
- Mosleyia nannotis — torrent tree frog
- Mosleyia rheocola — common mist frog
- Philoria kundagungan — mountain frog
- Philoria loveridgei — Loveridge's frog
- Philoria pughi
- Philoria richmondensis
- Philoria sphagnicolus — sphagnum frog
- Pseudophryne covacevichae — magnificent brood frog
- Pseudophryne pengilleyi — northern corroboree frog
- Ranoidea raniformis — growling grass frog
- Sylvagemma brevipalmata — green thighed frog

A * indicates possible extinction.

== Australian amphibian genera ==
Australia's amphibian consists of five native families, one introduced family and one introduced order. The sole species of true toad introduced to Australia which has naturalised, is the cane toad (Rhinella marinus), of the family Bufonidae. The cane toad was introduced to several locations throughout Queensland, and has since spread west and south. The introduction of smooth newt (Lissotriton vulgaris) marked the arrival of the order Urodela to the continent. Despite being prohibited to import, they have been located and have spread considerably to various locations in Melbourne from 2011 to 2016. It has potential to spread throughout south-eastern Australia.

The tree frogs, of the family Pelodryadidae, are one of the major families in Australia, with almost 100 species. The tree frogs were historically split into three genera: Cyclorana, Nyctimystes, and the wastebasket genus Litoria. However, a 2025 phylogenetic study of the family split it into 35 genera, 22 of which are found in Australia. The tree frogs of Australia have various habits, from completely arboreal to fossorial.

The other major clade that is native to Australia consists of two families: Myobatrachidae and Limnodynastidae. These families of ground frogs are endemic to Australia, New Guinea and a few small islands, however the highest diversity can be found in Australia.

Microhylidae and Ranidae make up a small amount of the Australian frog fauna, with just 26 species in Microhylidae and one species of Ranidae. The majority of the species within these families are found throughout the world, with Australia making up a small portion of their diversity.

Pelodryadidae 22 genera, 98 species
Genus	Common names	Example species	Example photo	Australian range
Carichyla - 1 species Mahony, Donnellan, and Richards, 2025	Dwarf tree frogs	Northern dwarf tree frog (Carichyla bicolor)		
Chlorohyla - 4 species Mahony, Donnellan & Richards, 2025	Red-eyed tree frogs	Orange-thighed frog (Chlorohyla xanthomera)		
Coggerdonia - 1 species Wells & Wellington, 1985	Slender tree frog	Slender tree frog (Coggerdonia adelaidensis)		
Colleeneremia - 7 species Wells & Wellington, 1985	-	Ruddy tree frog (Colleeneremia pyrina)		
Cyclorana - 14 species Steindachner, 1867	Water holding frogs	Rough frog (Cyclorana verrucosa)		
Drymomantis - 3 species Peters, 1882	Sedge frogs Dwarf tree frogs	Eastern dwarf tree frog (Drymomantis fallax)		
Dryopsophus - 10 species Mahony, Donnellan & Richards, 2025	Stream tree frogs	Mountain stream tree frog (Dryopsophus barringtonensis)		
Eremnoculus - 1 species Mahony, Richards, and Donnellan, 2025	Australian lace-lid	Australian lace-lid (Eremnoculus dayi)		
Litoria - 13 species Tschudi, 1838	-	Watjulum frog (Litoria watjulumensis)		
Mahonabatrachus - 4 species Wells & Wellington, 1985	-	Javelin frog (Mahonabatrachus microbelos)		
Megatestis - 1 species Donnellan, Mahony & Richards, 2025	Dahl's aquatic frog	Dahl's aquatic frog (Megatestis dahlii)		
Melvillihyla - 1 species McDonald, 1997	Cape Melville tree frog	Cape Melville tree frog (Melvillihyla andiirrmalin)		
Mosleyia - 4 species Wells & Wellington, 1985	Waterfall frogs Cascade frogs	Waterfall frog (Mosleyia nannotis)		
Pelodryas - 4 species Günther, 1859	Green tree frogs	Australian green tree frog (Pelodryas caerulea)		
Pengilleyia - 4 species Wells & Wellington, 1985	Laughing frogs	Peron's tree frog (Pengilleyia peronii)		
Ranoidea - 5 species Tschudi, 1838	Bell frogs	Green and golden bell frog (Ranoidea aurea)		
Rawlinsonia - 11 species Wells & Wellington, 1985	-	Jervis Bay tree frog (Rawlinsonia jervisiensis)		
Rhyaconastes - 4 species Günther, 1864	-	Stony creek frog (Rhyaconastes wilcoxi)		
Saganura - 1 species Wells & Wellington, 1985	Tasmanian tree frog	Tasmanian tree frog (Saganura burrowsae)		
Sandyrana - 1 species Wells & Wellington, 1985	White-lipped tree frog	White-lipped tree frog (Sandyrana infrafrenata)		
Spicicalyx - 3 species Donnellan, Mahony & Richards, 2025	-	Green-eyed treefrog (Spicicalyx serrata)		
Sylvagemma - 1 species Mahony, Donnellan, and Richards, 2025	Green-thighed frog	Green-thighed frog (Sylvagemma brevipalmata)		
Myobatrachidae - 14 genera, 91 species (3 extinct)
Genus	Common names	Example species	Example photo	Australian range
Anstisia - 4 species Webster & Bool, 2022	-	Roseate Frog (Anstisia rosea)		
Arenophryne - 2 species Tyler, 1976	Sandhill frog	Sandhill frog (Arenophryne rotunda)		
Assa (frog) - 2 species Tyler, 1972	Pouched frog	Pouched frog (Assa darlingtoni)		
Crinia - 17 species Tschudi, 1838	Australian froglets	Common eastern froglet (Crinia signifera)		
Geocrinia - 4 species Blake, 1973	Ground froglets	Smooth frog (Geocrinia laevis)		
Metacrinia - 1 species Parker, 1940	Nicholl's toadlet	Nicholl's toadlet (Metacrinia nichollsi)	-	
Mixophyes - 8 species Günther, 1864	Barred frogs	Great barred frog (Mixophyes fasciolatus)		
Myobatrachus - 1 species Tyler, 1976	Turtle frog	Turtle frog (Myobatrachus gouldii)		
Paracrinia - 1 species Heyer and Liem, 1976	Haswell's froglet	Haswell's froglet (Paracrinia haswelii)		
Pseudophryne - 14 species Fitzinger, 1843	Toadlets or brood frogs	Red-crowned toadlet (Pseudophryne australis)		
Rheobatrachus - 2 species Liem, 1973	Gastric brooding frogs	Southern gastric brooding frog (Rheobatrachus silus)		
Spicospina - 1 species Roberts, Horwitz, Wardell-Johnson, Maxson, and Mahony, 1997	Sunset frog	Sunset frog (Spicospina flammocaerulea)	-	
Taudactylus - 6 species Straughan and Lee, 1966	Torrent frogs	Eungella torrent frog (Taudactylus eungellensis)		
Uperoleia - 28 species Gray, 1841	Australian toadlets	Tyler's toadlet (Uperoleia tyleri)		
Limnodynastidae - 7 genera, 43 species
Genus	Common names	Example species	Example photo	Australian range
Adelotus - 1 species Ogilby, 1907	Tusked frog	Tusked frog (Adelotus brevis)		
Heleioporus - 6 species Gray, 1841	Giant burrowing frogs	Giant burrowing frog (Heleioporus australiacus)		
Limnodynastes - 13 species Fitzinger, 1843	Australian swamp frogs	Eastern banjo frog (Limnodynastes dumerilli)		
Neobatrachus - 9 species Peters, 1863	Spadefoot frogs	Painted frog (Neobatrachus pictus)		
Notaden - 4 species Günther, 1873	Australian spadefoot toads	Crucifix toad (Notaden bennettii)		
Philoria - 7 species Spencer, 1901	Mountain frogs	Sphagnum frog (Philoria sphagnicola)		
Platyplectrum - 3 species Günther, 1863	-	Ornate burrowing frog (Platyplectrum ornatum)		
Microhylidae - 4 genera, 26 species
Genus	Common names	Example species	Example photo	Australian range
Austrochaperina - 5 species Fry, 1912	Nursery frogs	Fry's frog (Austrochaperina fryi)		
Callulops - 1 species Boulenger, 1888	-	Gobakula Frog (Callulops gobakula)		Amphibians of Australia is located in Australia
Choerophryne - 1 species Van Kampen, 1914	-	Koeypad frog (Choerophryne koeypad)		Amphibians of Australia is located in Australia
Cophixalus - 14 species Boettger, 1892	Rainforest frogs	Black Mountain boulder frog (Cophixalus saxatilis)		
Ranidae - 1 genus, 1 species
Genus	Common names	Example species	Example photo	Australian range
Papurana - 1 species Linnaeus, 1758	True frogs	Australian wood frog (Papurana daemeli)		
Bufonidae - 1 genus, 1 species (introduced)
Genus	Common names	Example species	Example photo	Australian range
Rhinella - 1 species Fitzinger, 1826	Beaked toads or Rio Viejo toads	Cane toad (Rhinella marinus)		Map now out of date.
Salamandridae - 1 genus, 1 species (introduced)
Genus	Common names	Example species	Example photo	Australian range
Lissotriton - 1 species Bell, 1839	Common newts	Smooth newt (Lissotriton vulgaris)		

All numbers in the above table refer to Australian amphibians.
