= Mountain frog (disambiguation) =

The mountain frog is an Australian species of frog in the family Myobatrachidae.

Mountain frog may also refer to:

- Chamula mountain brook frog, a hylid frog endemic to Mexico
- Mountain chorus frog, a hylid frog of the United States
- Mountain mist frog, a hylid frog of Australia
- Mountain rain frog, a brevicipitid frog endemic to South Africa
- Mountain yellow-legged frog, a ranid frog endemic to California, United States
- Masked mountain frog, a myobatrachid frog of Australia

== See also ==
- Mountain tree frog (disambiguation)
