= Bell frog =

Bell frog may refer to:

- Green and golden bell frog (Litoria aurea), a frog in the family Hylidae native to eastern Australia
- Southern bell frog (Litoria raniformis), a frog in the family Hylidae native to southeastern Australia including Tasmania
- Tablelands bell frog (Litoria castanea), a frog in the family Hylidae endemic to southeastern Australia
- Western bell frog (Litoria moorei), a frog in the family Hylidae found in southwest Australia
