= Arizona tree frog =

These species of tree frogs in the family Hylidae are commonly referred to as the Arizona tree frog:

- Canyon tree frog (Hyla arenicolor)
- Mountain tree frog (Hyla eximia), listed as the official Arizona state amphibian, but as currently circumscribed does not occur in Arizona
- Arizona tree frog (Hyla wrightorum), previously considered a synonym of Hyla eximia, present in Arizona
