= Mountain tree frog (disambiguation) =

The mountain tree frog is a species of frog in the family Hylidae endemic to Mexico.

Mountain tree frog may also refer to:

- Mountain big-eyed tree frog, a frog endemic to West Papua, Indonesia
- Mountain stream tree frog, a frog native to Australia
- Wright's mountain tree frog, a frog found in Mexico and the United States
