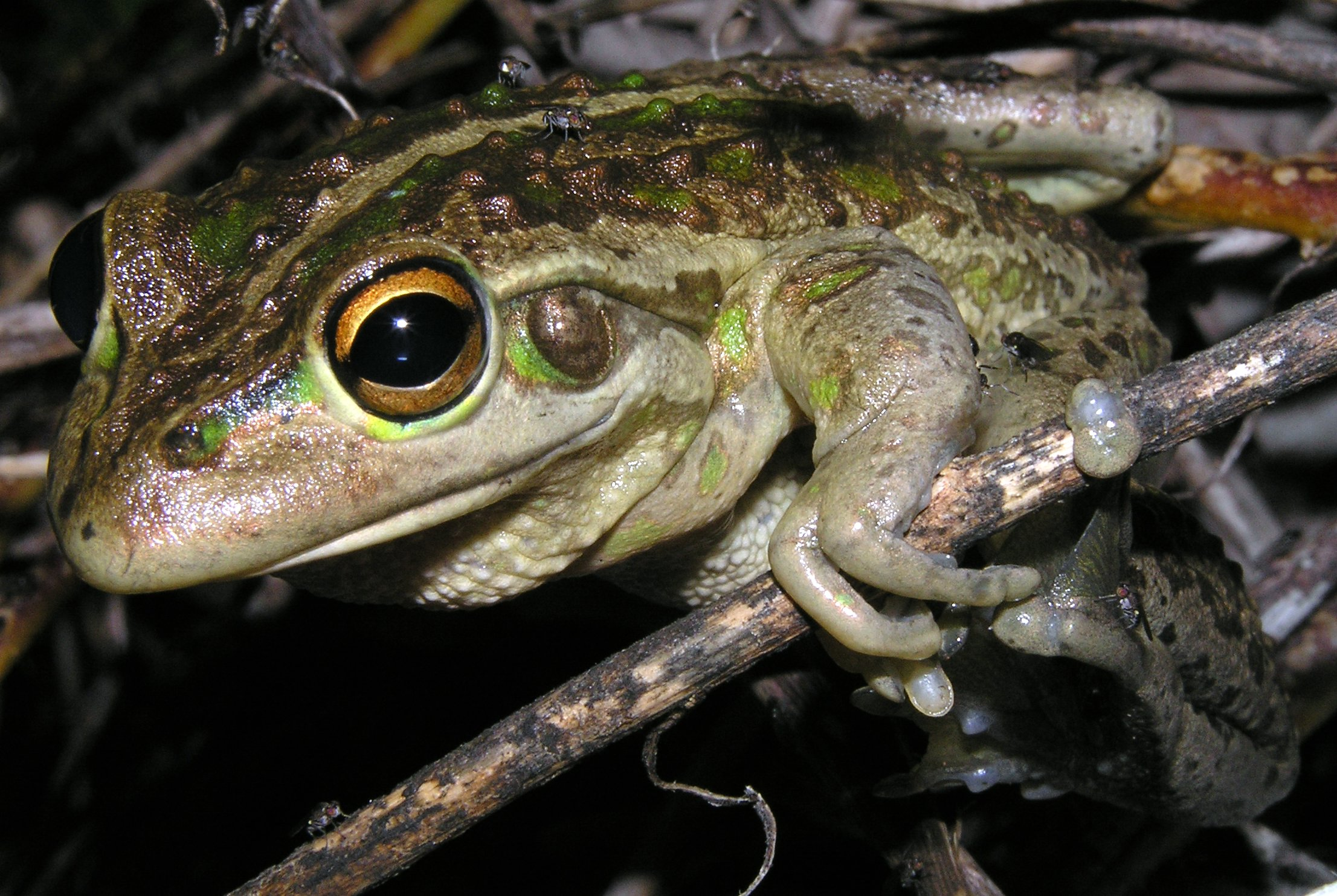

Conservation status
- Least Concern (IUCN 3.1)

Scientific classification
- Kingdom: Animalia
- Phylum: Chordata
- Class: Amphibia
- Order: Anura
- Family: Pelodryadidae
- Genus: Ranoidea
- Species: R. moorei

Binomial name
- Ranoidea moorei (Copland, 1957)
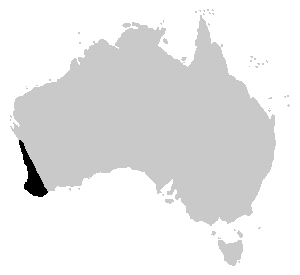
- Distribution of Ranoidea moorei

= Motorbike frog =

Species of amphibian

Ranoidea moorei (motorbike frogs), night-time calls

The motorbike frog (Ranoidea moorei) is a ground-dwelling tree frog of the subfamily Pelodryadinae found in Southwest Australia. Its common name is derived from the male frog's mating call, which sounds similar to a motorbike changing up through gears; it is also known as Moore's frog, the western bell frog, western green and golden bell frog, and western green tree frog. The Noongar name for it is Kyooya.^{Note 1}

== Taxonomy ==
R. moorei is a member of the Ranoidea aurea complex (Ranoidea aurea, R. raniformis and R. castanea).

== Description ==
R. moorei is able to camouflage itself well, and ranges in colour from dark brown, through green, to gold. The underside is noticeably lighter, and usually ranges from very pale green to light brown. The light green of the groin and thigh distinguishes this species from its cogenor, Ranoidea cyclorhynchus, which is darker and spotted with yellow there.

Typical of tree frogs, its toe pads enable it to climb smooth vertical surfaces. Its hind legs are powerful, and the toes are webbed. In mating season, the males develop black nuptial pads that enable them to cling to the females' backs during amplexus. R. moorei can be up to 7.5 cm in length.

The tadpole's body is a uniform dark brown above with a silvery sheen below; initially minute in size, they grow to a very large 80 mm in length. The tadpoles usually hide amongst vegetation, but are easily encouraged out of hiding when food is presented. For most of their time as tadpoles, they crowd together in schools.

== Distribution and habitat ==
South-west corner of Western Australia, from as far north as the Geraldton Sandplains, to the Esperance Plains on the south coast of WA. A population exists on Rottnest Island, and the species is one of the most well known frogs found in urban Perth areas.

The estimated altitudinal range of the species is from 0–600 m asl. A wide and populous distribution through lakes and swamps has readily incorporated garden ponds and farm dams, where they are often found sunbathing on the upper leaves of plants.

== Ecology and behaviour ==
Breeding season is from early spring through to late summer. The male's mating call sounds like a motorbike changing gears. The males usually find a suitable clump of reeds or other water plants from which to call. When a female joins the male in the water, the male grips onto the female's back, using his nuptial pads, that appear during breeding season. Large clumps of eggs, encased in a transparent jelly, are attached to floating vegetation and debris.

Despite being a tree frog, R. moorei seldom climbs higher than 1–2 m, on plants, shrubs, brick walls, or windows.

Their diets consist mainly of arthropods, but also include smaller frogs, including juveniles of the same species. The tadpole's main diet is algae, but they also eat animal matter when available. Tadpoles, like adult frogs, sunbathe for one or two hours each day for healthy growth.

They can live without water for extended periods of time.

== Threats ==
Unlike the eastern members of the species complex, the motorbike frog has not suffered from dramatic declines, despite chytrid fungus being present in areas which they inhabit.

== Gallery ==
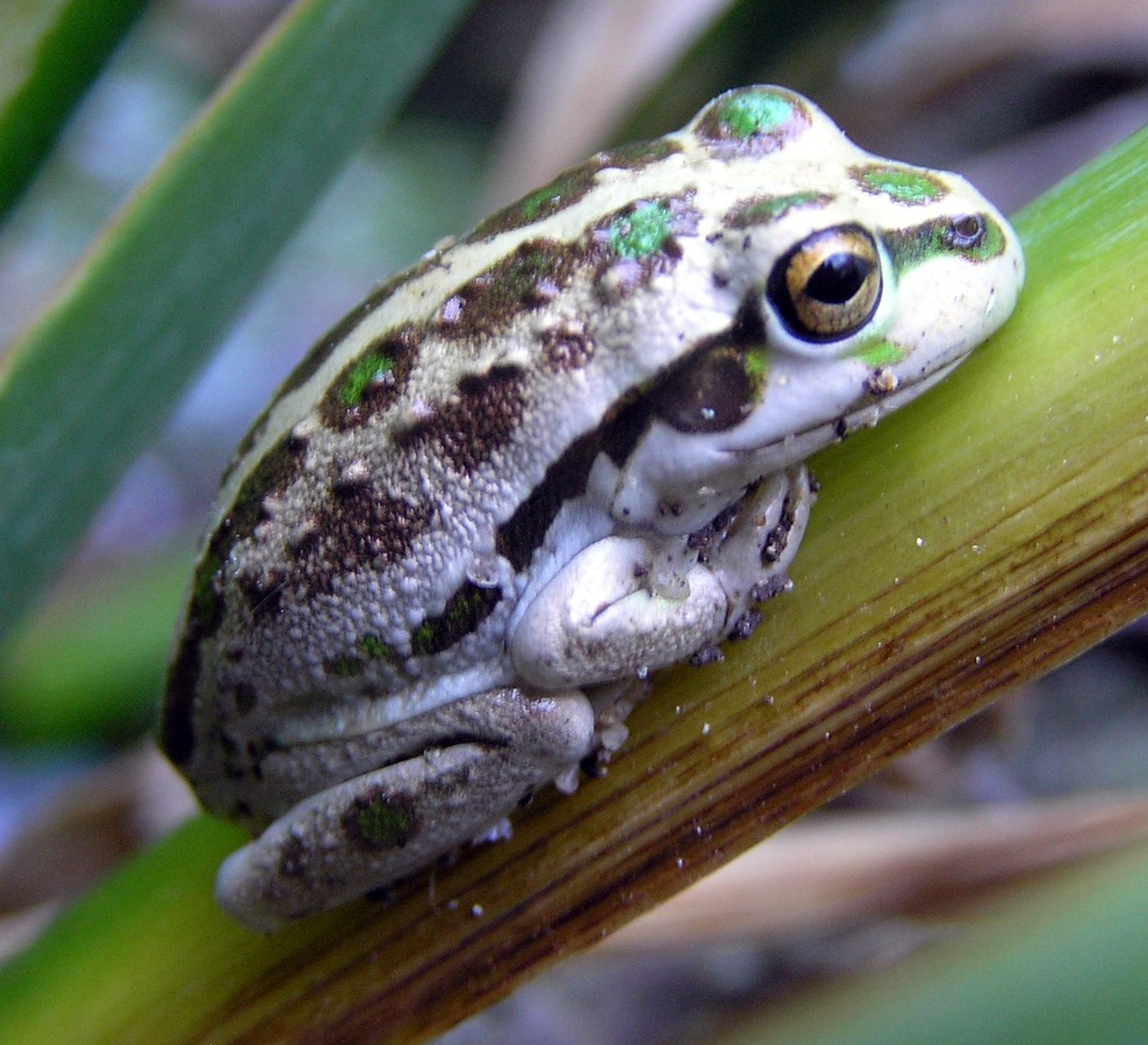
Juvenile motorbike frog

Calling, Bayswater

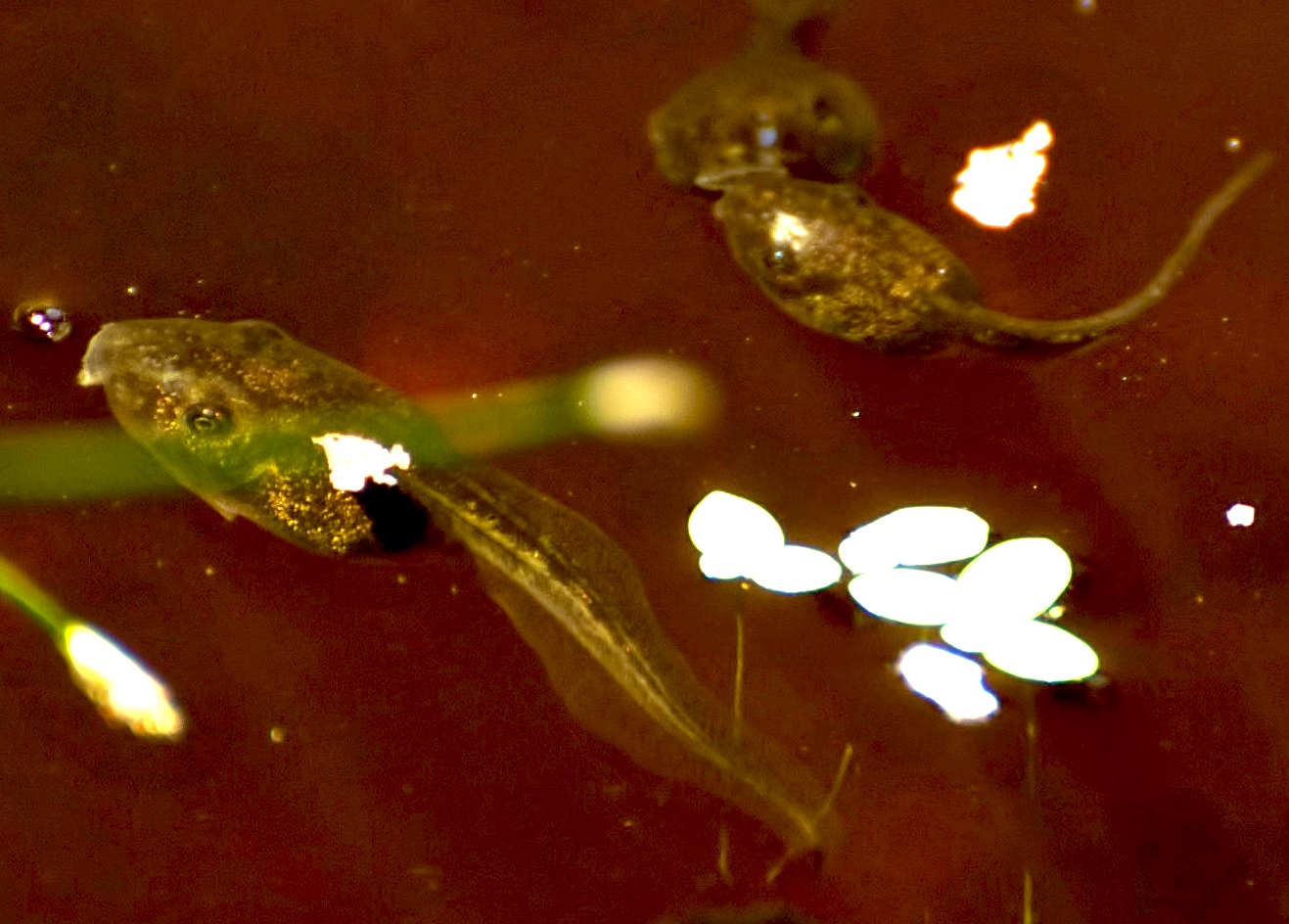
Three-week-old Ranoidea moorei tadpoles, backyard pond, Bayswater

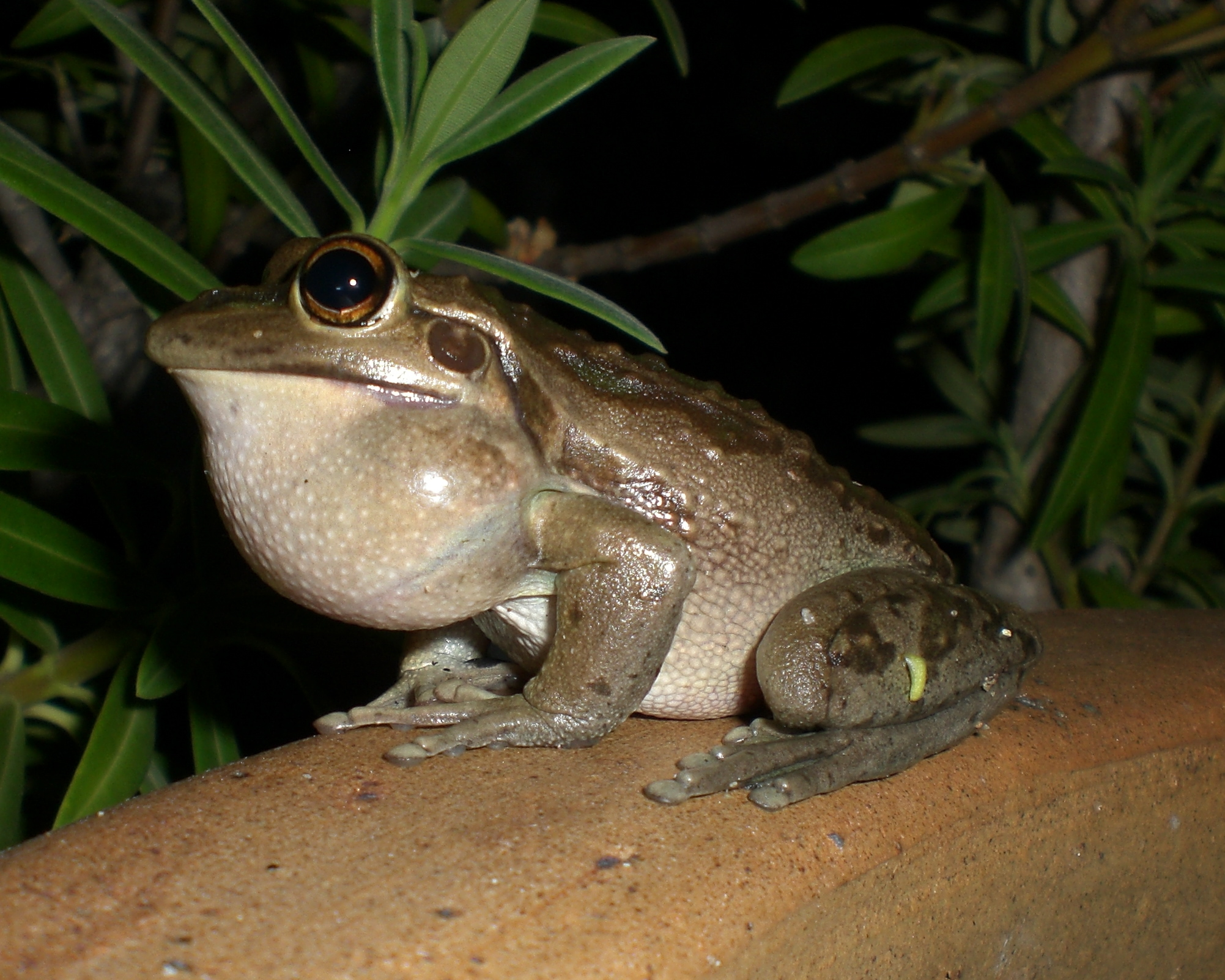
Ranoidea moorei calling, Swanbourne

== See also ==
- Green and golden bell frog - closely related

== Notes ==
- ^Note 1 Kyooya and Kooyar are alternative spellings for a general term for frog in Noongar. It is sometimes used to refer to the motorbike frog specifically. To hear the Noongar word for the motorbike frog, see under the external links.
