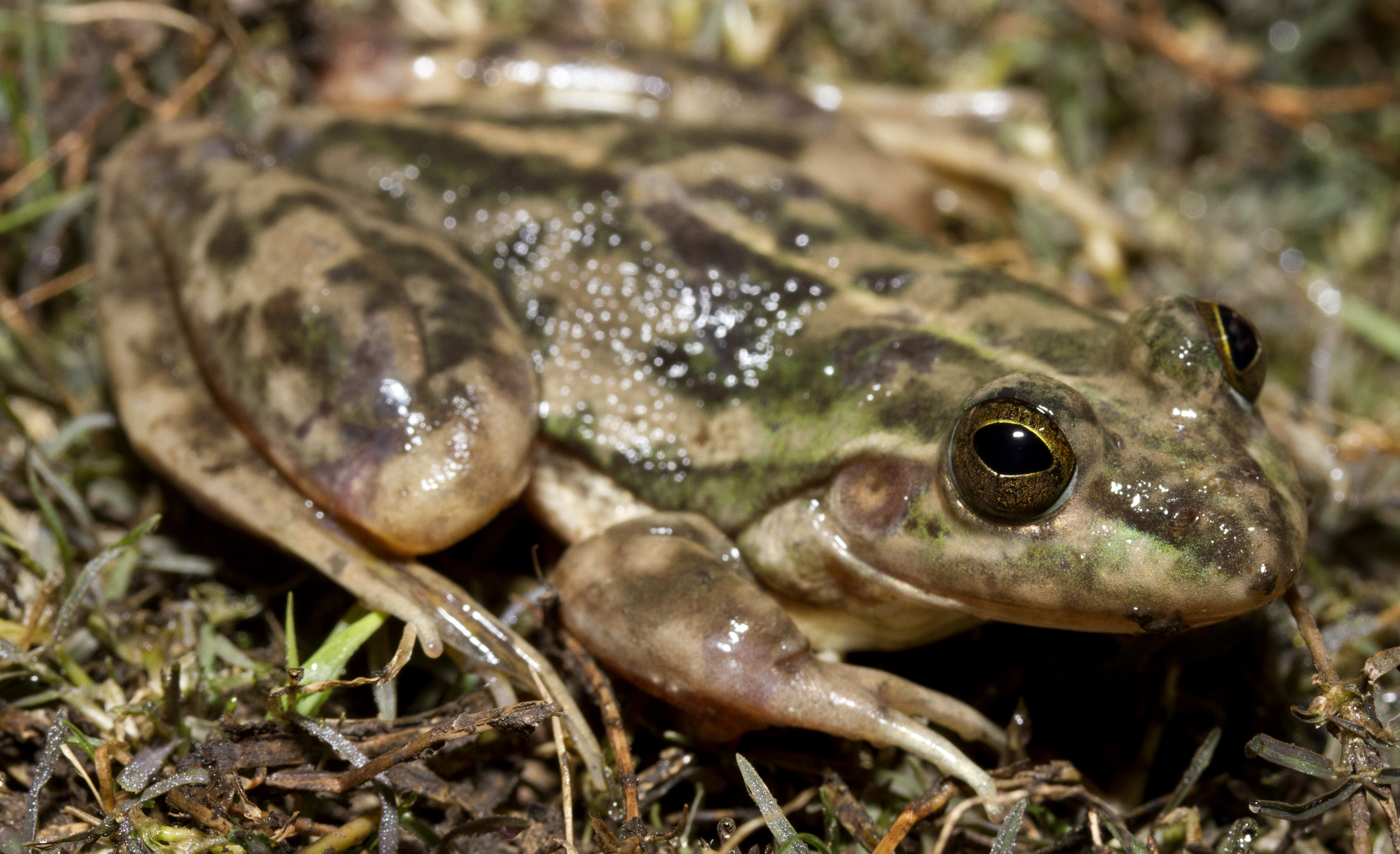
- Dahl's aquatic frog in Northern Territory, Australia

Conservation status
- Least Concern (IUCN 3.1)

Scientific classification
- Kingdom: Animalia
- Phylum: Chordata
- Class: Amphibia
- Order: Anura
- Family: Pelodryadidae
- Genus: Megatestis
- Species: M. dahlii

Binomial name
- Megatestis dahlii (Boulenger, 1896)
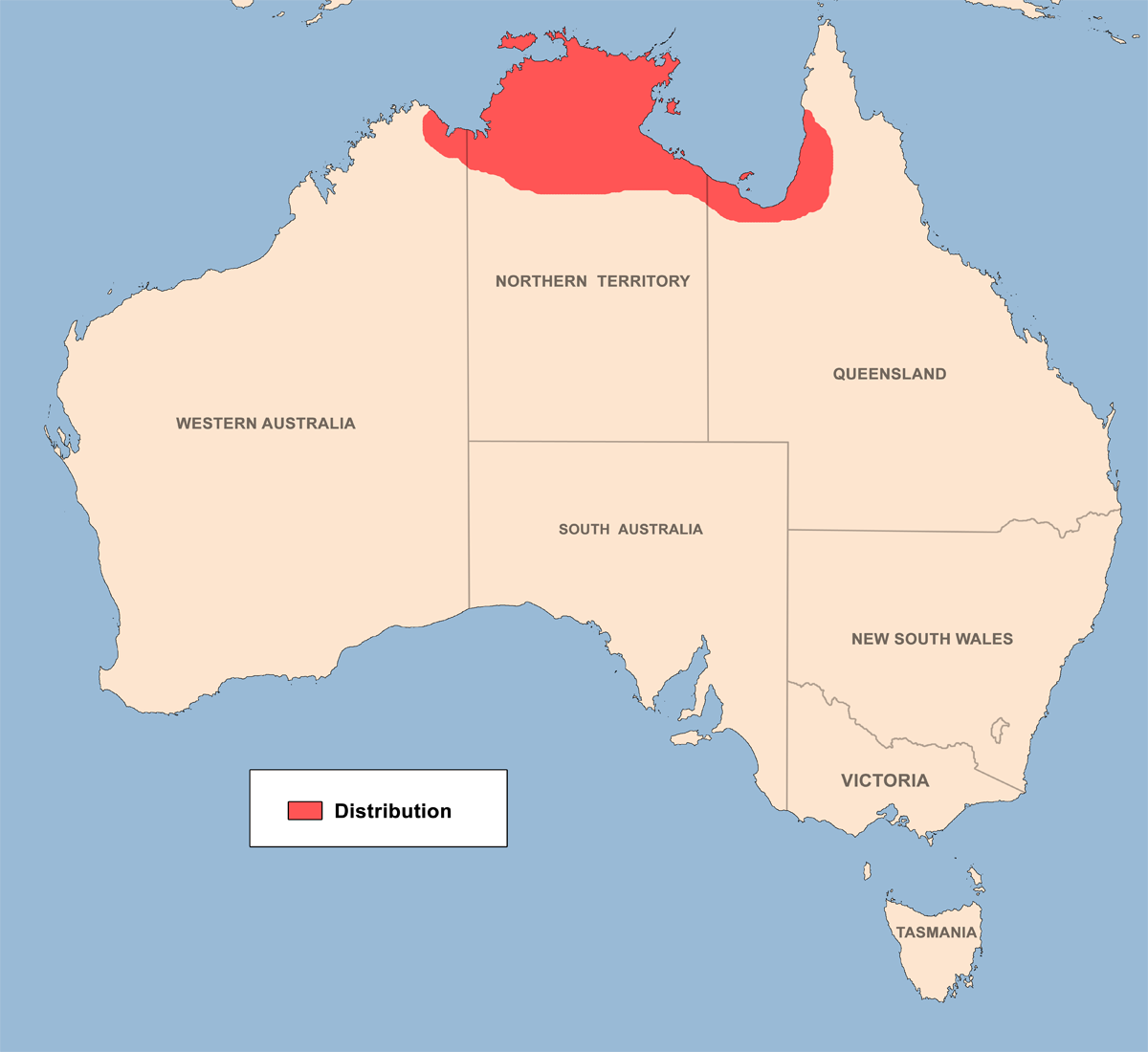
- Distribution of Dahl's aquatic frog

Synonyms
- Litoria dahlii (Boulenger, 1896); Ranoidea dahlii

= Dahl's aquatic frog =

Species of amphibian

Dahl's aquatic frog (Megatestis dahlii) is a species of frog in the family Pelodryadidae, endemic to northern Australia. Its natural habitats are dry savanna, subtropical or tropical dry lowland grassland, freshwater lakes, intermittent freshwater lakes, freshwater marshes, and intermittent freshwater marshes.

Due to similar appearance and habitats, it was previously considered a close relative to Ranoidea, but more recent genetic analysis placed it in the same clade as the Leptobatrachus from New Guinea. This study placed it within its own genus, Megatestis named for the "spectacularly large testis to body mass ratio... among the largest in the animal kingdom".

Dahl's aquatic frog was once thought to be able to consume the eggs, tadpoles, and young of the invasive and venomous cane toad with no apparent ill effect, but this observation was based on a handful of captive survivals. Adults regurgitate the young toads, and avoid eating them in the future, or rarely swallow them; in this case, about half the adults die. These frogs do not appear to have an elevated resistance to bufotoxins compared to other Australian hylid frogs, and avoid these toads if they survive their first toad meal.
