= Cape Melville tree frog =

Conservation status
- Vulnerable (IUCN 3.1)

Scientific classification
- Kingdom: Animalia
- Phylum: Chordata
- Class: Amphibia
- Order: Anura
- Family: Pelodryadidae
- Genus: Melvillihyla
- Species: M. andiirrmalin

Binomial name
- Melvillihyla andiirrmalin (MacDonald, 1997)

Synonyms
- Litoria andiirrmalin MacDonald, 1997

Species of amphibian

The Cape Melville tree frog (Melvillihyla andiirrmalin) is a species of frog in the family Pelodryadidae. It is endemic to Australia, and has been found only in Queensland, in Cape Melville National Park. Its natural habitats are subtropical or tropical moist lowland forests and rivers.

It was first described by Keith McDonald in 1997 as Litoria andiirrmalin, but was transferred to the genus Ranoidea, by Dubois and Frétey in 2016. However, a systematic phylogenetic study of the family created the monotypic genus Melvillihyla for this species, as it diverged from its closest relatives in the genus Rhyaconastes approximately 14 million years ago.
