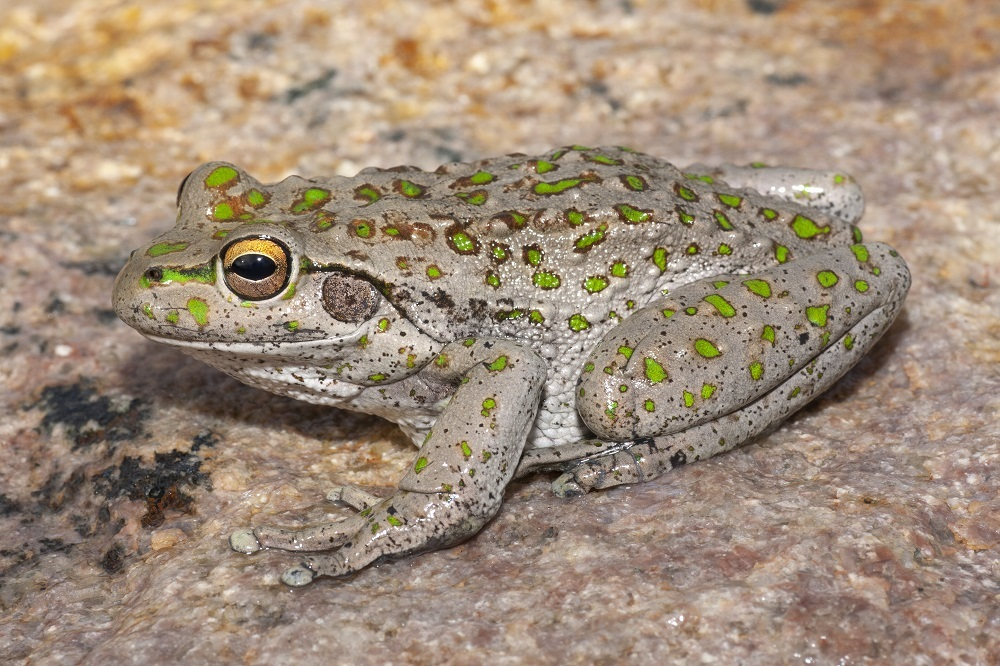

Conservation status
- Least Concern (IUCN 3.1)

Scientific classification
- Kingdom: Animalia
- Phylum: Chordata
- Class: Amphibia
- Order: Anura
- Family: Pelodryadidae
- Genus: Ranoidea
- Species: R. cyclorhynchus

Binomial name
- Ranoidea cyclorhynchus (Boulenger, 1882)

Synonyms
- List: Litoria punctata Duméril, 1853; Litoria marmorata Duméril, 1853; Hyla hyposticta Cope, 1866; Hyla dimolops Cope, 1866; Hyla thyposticta Cope, 1870 "1869"; Hyla aurea var. cyclorhynchus Boulenger, 1882; Hyla cyclorhynchus Boulenger, 1882; Litoria cyclorhynchus (Boulenger, 1882); Ranoidea cyclorhyncha (Boulenger, 1882); Litoria cyclorhyncha (Boulenger, 1882); Dryopsophus cyclorhynchus (Boulenger, 1882)

= Spotted-thighed tree frog =

Species of amphibian

The spotted-thighed tree frog (Ranoidea cyclorhynchus) is a species of tree frog in the subfamily Pelodryadinae, found in Western Australia.

== Description ==
The frog is similar in appearance to its cogener, Ranoidea moorei, bearing dark green or brownish patches with bronze or gold highlights on its back; this species can be differentiated by the numerous yellowish spots on the underside of the rear legs. Males may be up to 65 mm, females to 85 mm. The name Copland's rock frog is sometimes mistakenly applied to this species (it is actually Litoria coplandi). The feet are unwebbed and have a prominent disc at the toes.

== Distribution and habitat ==
It is endemic to Southwest Australia, as one of only four in that diverse genus to be found in the region. It occurs on the southern coastal areas, favouring permanent water and granite outcrops, but can be found at its northernmost extent in agricultural dams. Recorded sightings are also at Middle Island in the Archipelago of the Recherche, and Coragina Rock. Its natural habitats are rivers, swamps, freshwater lakes, and freshwater marshes. It is threatened by habitat loss, although it is considered to be of least concern with regard to extinction.

There are concerns that the spotted-thighed tree frog has recently become established on the Eyre Peninsula of South Australia, and that it might spread further eastward into the Murray-Darling Basin and interbreed with or displace threatened species there.
