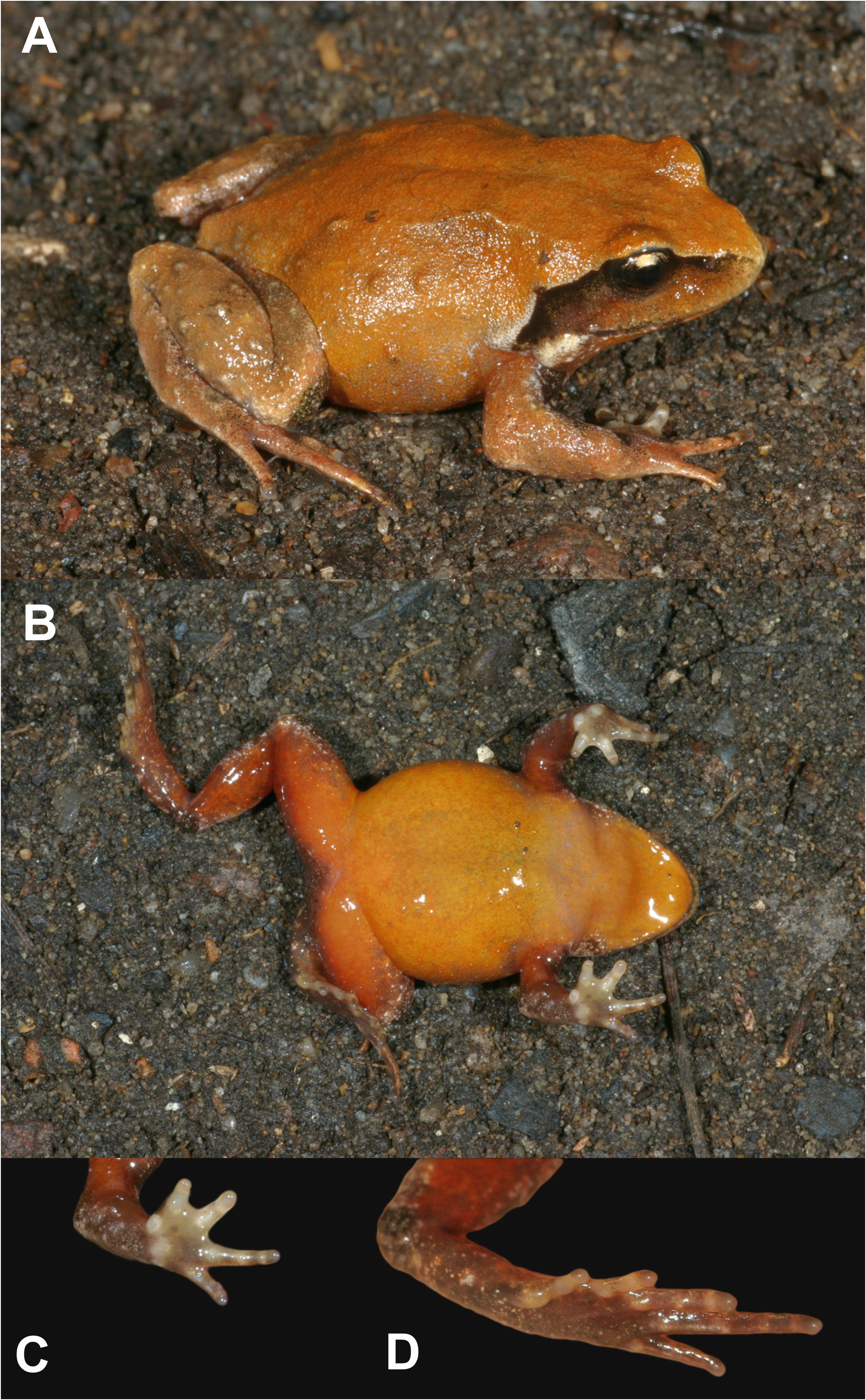

Conservation status
- Endangered (EPBC Act)

Scientific classification
- Kingdom: Animalia
- Phylum: Chordata
- Class: Amphibia
- Order: Anura
- Family: Limnodynastidae
- Genus: Philoria
- Species: P. knowlesi

Binomial name
- Philoria knowlesi Mahony, Hines, Mahony, and Donnellan, 2022

= Mount Ballow mountain frog =

Species of frog

The Mount Ballow mountain frog (Philoria knowlesi) is a species of frog in the family Limnodynastidae. It is endemic to eastern Australia, straddling the border of Queensland and New South Wales. It is known only from the central and western McPherson Ranges, in the Gondwana Rainforests World Heritage Site.

It closely resembles nearby Philoria species, and was only described as a distinct species in 2022, following geographic sampling that found significant genetic divergence. It is named after Sydney environmentalist Ross Knowles for his contributions to the study of Australian frogs.

This species breeds in bogs, seepages, and the banks of headwater streams. As with other members of the genus, it has a unique breeding strategy where the male creates a small breeding chamber that the tadpoles develop in.

Although it is found in some protected areas such as Mount Barney National Park, it is highly threatened by invasive species, habitat loss, and potentially chytridomycosis, and its range has the potential to shrink significantly due to climate change. A significant portion of its habitat was burned in the 2019–20 Australian bushfires, although surviving frogs were found at burned sites. It has been proposed to classify it as Endangered on the IUCN Red List. As of March 2025, the species is listed as Endangered under the Environment Protection and Biodiversity Conservation Act 1999.
