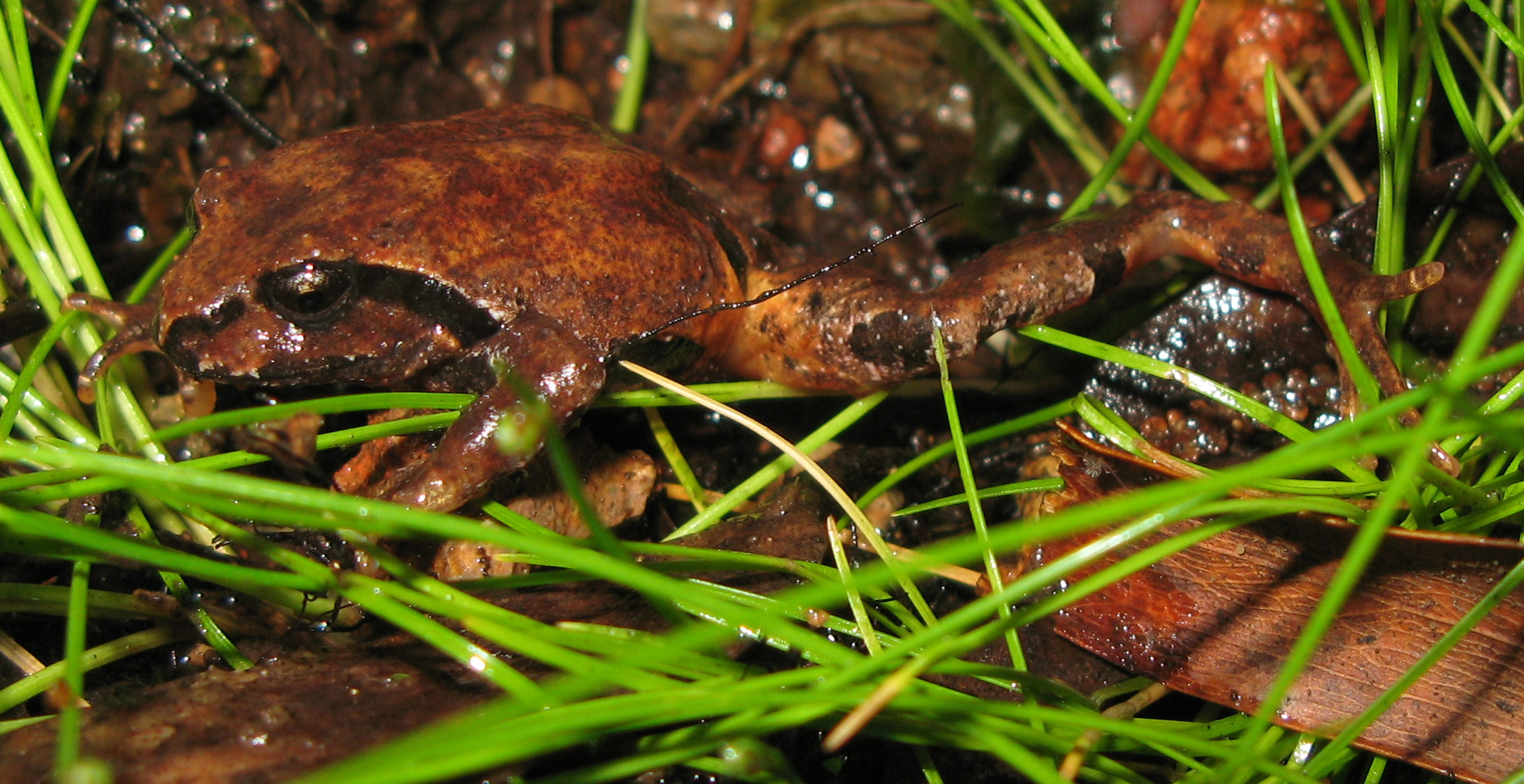

Conservation status
- Vulnerable (IUCN 3.1)

Scientific classification
- Kingdom: Animalia
- Phylum: Chordata
- Class: Amphibia
- Order: Anura
- Family: Limnodynastidae
- Genus: Philoria
- Species: P. sphagnicola

Binomial name
- Philoria sphagnicola (Moore, 1958)

Synonyms
- Kyarranus sphagnicolus Moore, 1958; Philoria sphagnicolus Cogger, Cameron, and Cogger, 1983

= Sphagnum frog =

Species of amphibian

The sphagnum frog (Philoria sphagnicola) is a frog in the family Limnodynastidae. The species was first described by John Alexander Moore in 1958. Its natural habitats are subtropical moist upland forests, subtropical moist montane forests, and streams. They vary in colour from shades of yellow and orange. They usually have irregular black spots that range all over their body. Their main source of diet comes from small insects, usually ants. This species was classified as endangered in 2004, and was subsequently downlisted to vulnerable in 2023. It is threatened by climate change pathogens and habitat loss. It is endemic to Australia. There have been other recommendations by scientist and other groups made to protect this species. Some of these recommendations are exclude logging around breeding areas, prevent pollution of streams and wetlands, and maintain vegetation and deep-leaf litter around streams.
