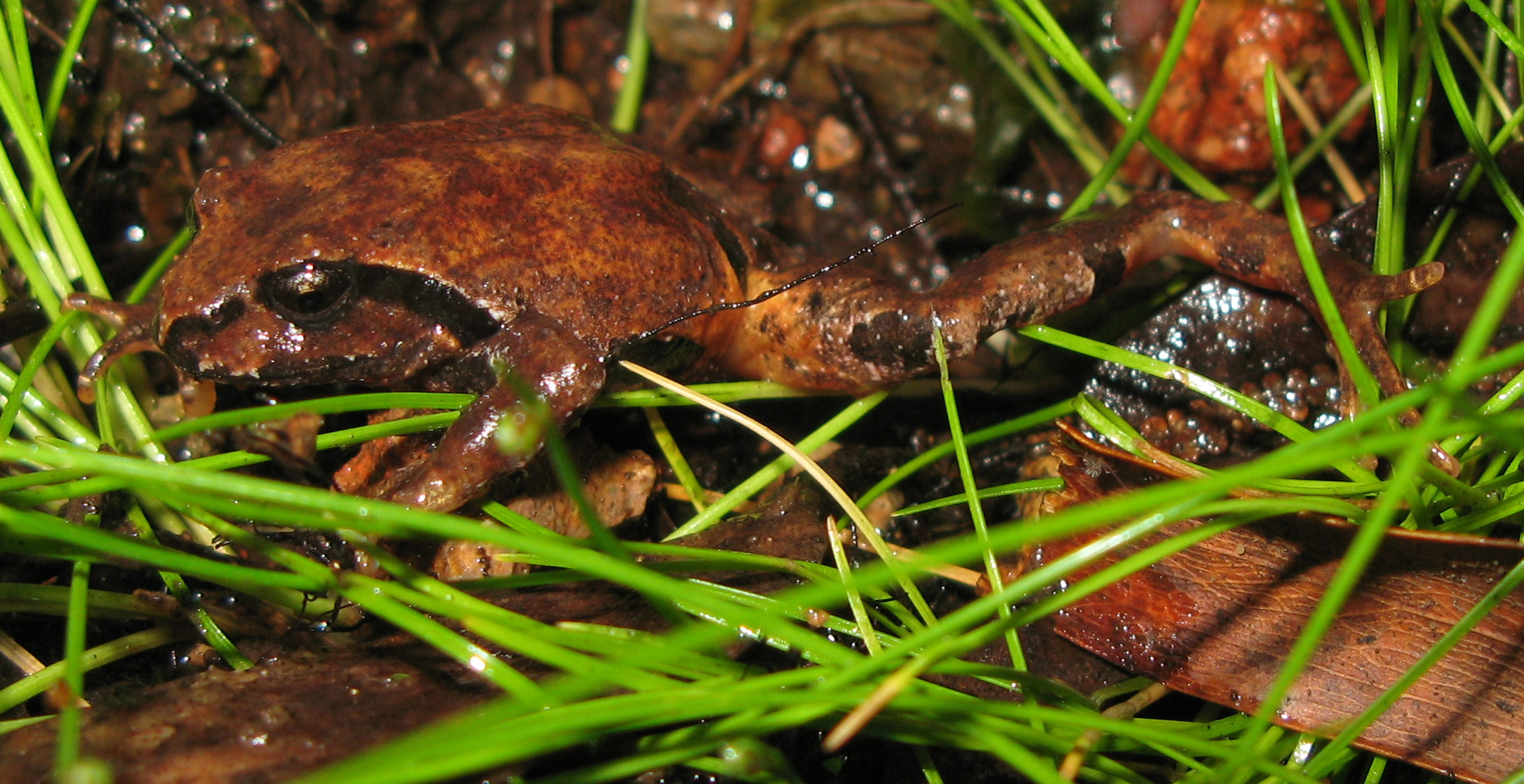
- Sphagnum frog (Philoria sphagnicolus)

Scientific classification
- Kingdom: Animalia
- Phylum: Chordata
- Class: Amphibia
- Order: Anura
- Family: Limnodynastidae
- Genus: Philoria; Spencer, 1901

Diversity
- 7 species
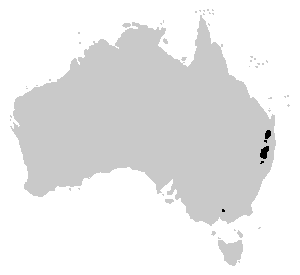
- Philoria range.

Synonyms
- Kyarranus Moore, 1958

= Philoria =

Philoria Temporal range: Early Miocene–present

Genus of amphibians

Philoria is a genus of frogs native to eastern and southern Australia. These frogs are all confined to mountain areas, with 7 species occurring in the mountains of northern New South Wales and southern Queensland. One species occurs in Victoria. All species are listed as endangered, except the Baw Baw frog, which is listed as critically endangered. They are small to medium-sized frogs that live in water saturated sites, such as sphagnum bogs and seepages on rocky slopes. The eggs are laid in foam nests hidden from light. The tadpoles remain within the nest and live entirely on the yolk.

Some taxonomists class only the Baw Baw frog (Philoria frosti) in the genus Philoria and class the other 5 species in the genus Kyarranus because of osteological features, size differences (Philoria frosti is larger) and the presence of a large gland behind each eye (parotoid gland).

== Species ==
There are seven species in the genus Philoria:

Common name	Binomial name
Baw Baw frog	Philoria frosti Spencer, 1901
Mount Ballow mountain frog	Philoria knowlesi Mahony, Hines, Mahony & Donnellan, 2022
Mountain frog	Philoria kundagungan (Ingram & Corben, 1975)
Loveridge's frog	Philoria loveridgei Parker, 1940
Pugh's frog	Philoria pughi Knowles, Mahony, Armstrong & Donnellan, 2004
Richmond frog	Philoria richmondensis Knowles, Mahony, Armstrong & Donnellan, 2004
Sphagnum frog	Philoria sphagnicolus (Moore, 1958)

The fossil species Philoria borealis (Tyler, 1991) (initially described as Kyarranus borealis) is known from the Early Miocene of Riversleigh.
