= Pugh's frog =

Conservation status
- Endangered (IUCN 3.1)

Scientific classification
- Kingdom: Animalia
- Phylum: Chordata
- Class: Amphibia
- Order: Anura
- Family: Limnodynastidae
- Genus: Philoria
- Species: P. pughi

Binomial name
- Philoria pughi Knowles, Mahony, Armstrong & Donnellan, 2004

Species of frog

Pugh's frog (Philoria pughi) is a species of frog in the family Limnodynastidae.

It is endemic to Australia. Its natural habitats are subtropical or tropical moist lowland forests, subtropical or tropical moist montane forests, rivers, and intermittent freshwater marshes. It is threatened by habitat loss.
