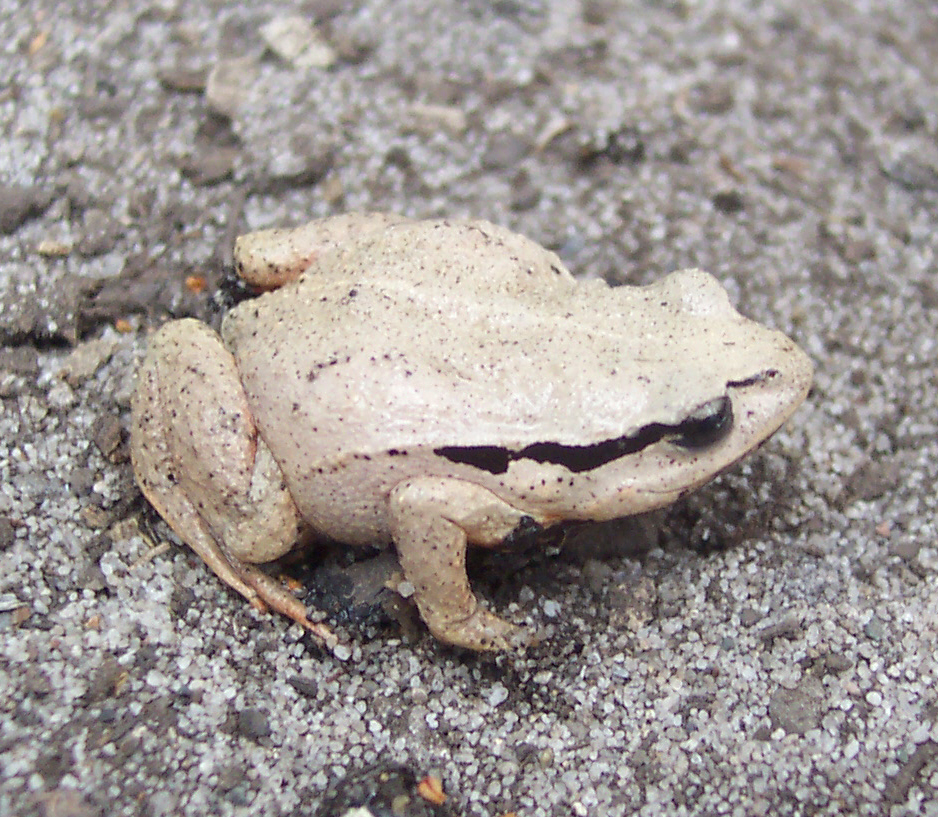
- Mature Haswell's froglet
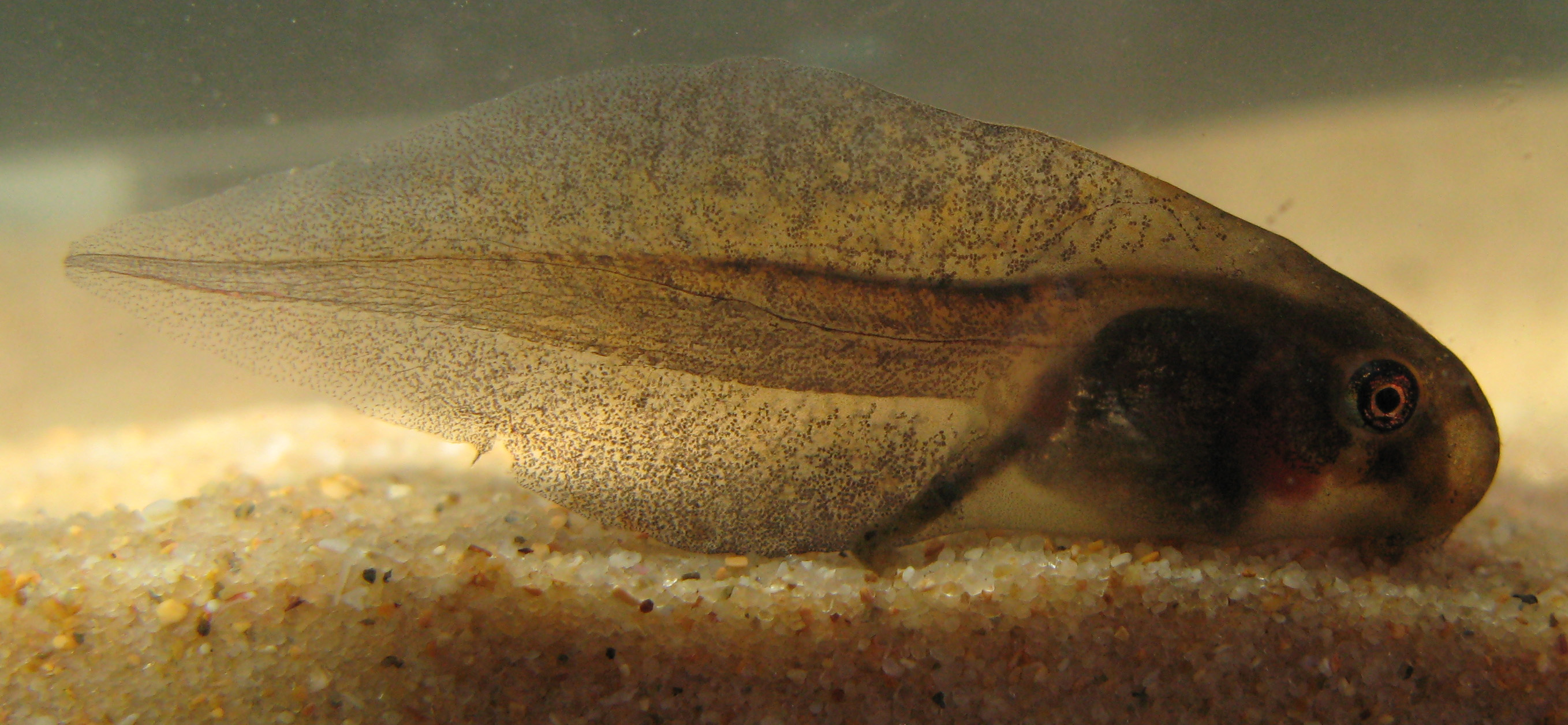
- Tadpole stage of Haswell's frog

Conservation status
- Least Concern (IUCN 3.1)

Scientific classification
- Kingdom: Animalia
- Phylum: Chordata
- Class: Amphibia
- Order: Anura
- Family: Myobatrachidae
- Genus: Paracrinia; Heyer & Liem, 1976
- Species: P. haswelli

Binomial name
- Paracrinia haswelli (Fletcher, 1894)
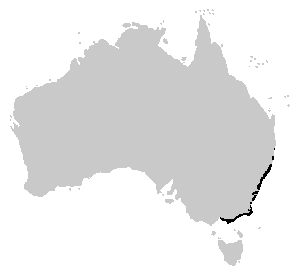
- Distribution of the Haswell's froglet

= Haswell's frog =

Species of amphibian

Haswell's frog (Paracrinia haswelli) is a small ground frog found around coastal swamps in eastern Australia from around Port Macquarie, New South Wales to the Mornington Peninsula in Victoria. It is the only member of the genus Paracrinia.

== Description ==
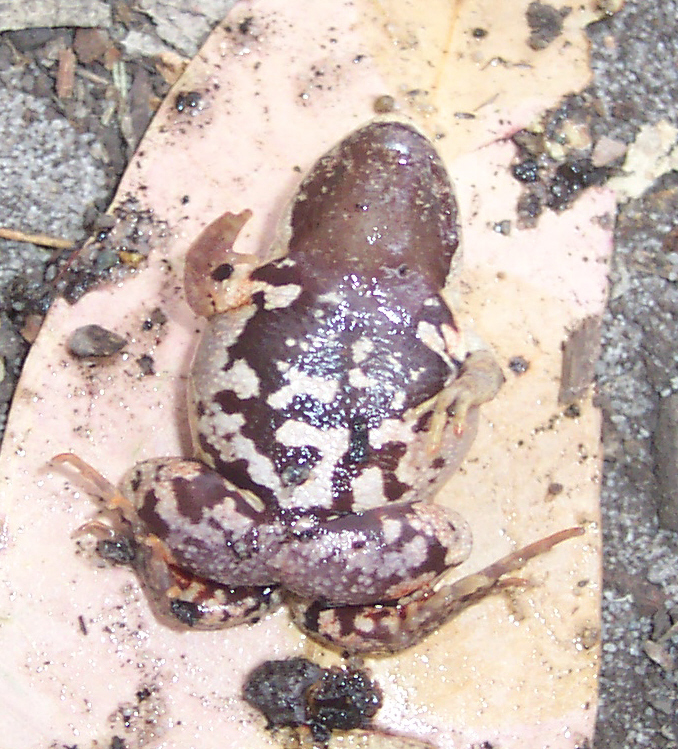
The ventral surface of Paracrinia haswelli

This species of frog reaches 30 mm (1.2 in) in length. This frog varies from light grey-brown, pale brown to red-brown above with some darker flecks. There is normally a faint mid-dorsal stripe running down the back. There is also a dark band running from the back of the eye to the shoulder. The top half of the iris is silver. The thighs are red, which gives it another name, the red-groined froglet. The ventral surface of this species is light brown with white patches.

== Ecology and behaviour ==
This species is associated with coastal swamps, particularly in wallum swampland and heathland. This species also inhabits dams, ponds, and ditches in sclerophyll forest and woodland.

Males make an "annk" call from water or on land during most of the year, but most often after rain in autumn and winter. Eggs are laid in water attached to sticks and leaves. The tadpole of this species has very deeply arched tail fins. Metamorphosis occurs during spring and autumn after a tadpole life span of about 100 days. Metamorph frogs measure 13 mm (0.51 in) and resemble the adult, however, the thigh red colouration is not yet fully developed.
