= Richmond frog =

Conservation status
- Endangered (IUCN 3.1)

Scientific classification
- Kingdom: Animalia
- Phylum: Chordata
- Class: Amphibia
- Order: Anura
- Family: Limnodynastidae
- Genus: Philoria
- Species: P. richmondensis

Binomial name
- Philoria richmondensis Knowles, Mahony, Armstrong & Donnellan, 2004

Species of frog

The Richmond frog (Philoria richmondensis) is a species of frog in the family Limnodynastidae.

It is endemic to Australia. Its natural habitats are subtropical or tropical moist lowland forests, subtropical or tropical moist montane forests, rivers, intermittent rivers, and intermittent freshwater marshes. It is threatened by habitat loss.

The snout-vent length is 28 mm.
