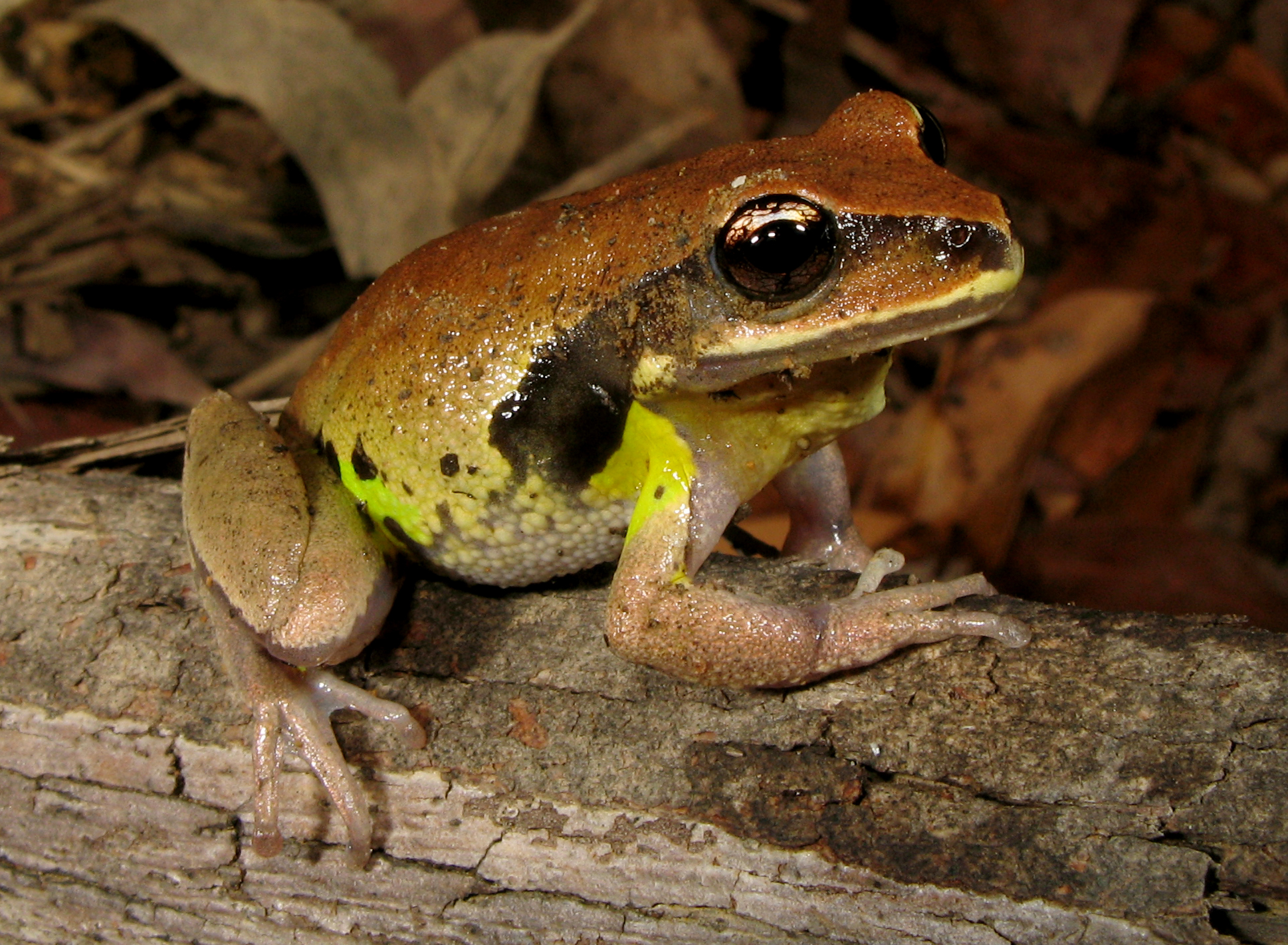

Conservation status
- Endangered (IUCN 3.1)

Scientific classification
- Kingdom: Animalia
- Phylum: Chordata
- Class: Amphibia
- Order: Anura
- Family: Pelodryadidae
- Genus: Sylvagemma
- Species: S. brevipalmata

Binomial name
- Sylvagemma brevipalmata (Tyler, Martin and Watson, 1972)
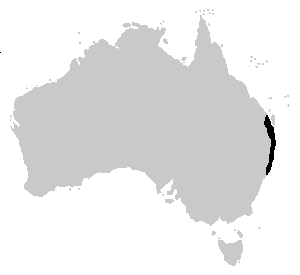
- Range of the green-thighed frog

Synonyms
- Litoria brevipalmatus Tyler, Martin, and Watson, 1972

= Green-thighed frog =

Species of amphibian

The green-thighed frog (Sylvagemma brevipalmata) is a species of Australo-Papuan tree frog. Members of this species are medium-sized, ground-dwelling frogs, native to sclerophyll forests in eastern Australia.

== Distribution ==
The green-thighed frog range stretches from Cordalba State Forest in south-eastern Queensland to Ourimbah in New South Wales. Within this area, though, populations are severely fragmented. Numbers have decreased at Ourimbah, but there have been no record of declines or disappearances elsewhere. They are believed to occupy an area of less than 500 km^{2}, which has led to them being listed as endangered on the IUCN RedList of Threatened Species

== Description ==
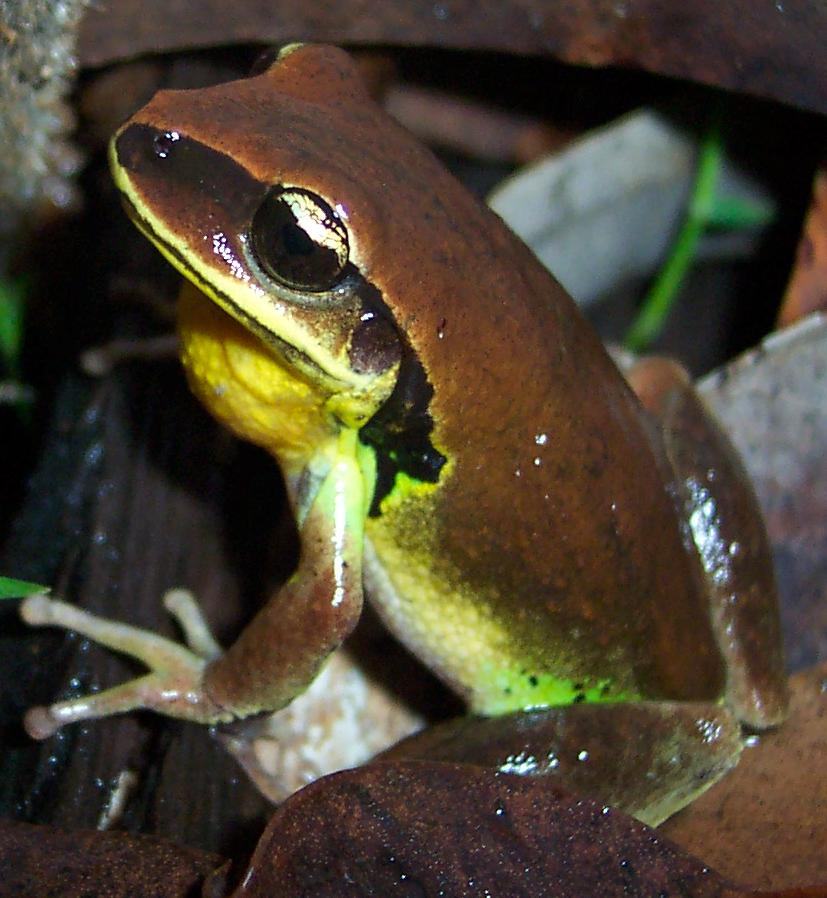
Distinctive bright green is visible in the armpit and thigh.

The dorsal surface is chocolate brown with darker flecks. The ventral surface is white or pale yellow and peppered with fine dark spots over the throat. A thick stripe runs from the snout, across the eye and tympanum, and then breaks up into blotches on the sides. The margin of the upper jaw is marked with white; this stripe continues to the base of the arm. The armpits are marked with lime green or yellow. The backs of the thighs and groin are bright blue, green, or blue-green, with black mottling. The tympanum is distinct, and finger and toe pads are medium-sized. The fingers don't web and the toes are one-third webbed. The iris is dark brown with a golden crescent in the upper half. The legs are shorter compared to other ground-dwelling Pelodryadids.

Both the genus and species name derive from physical descriptions of their morphology. Sylvagemma is from the Latin 'sylva' meaning forest and 'gemma' meaning a jewel, whilst brevipalmata refers to the lack of webbing on its hands.

== Ecology and behaviour ==
The green-thighed frog inhabits areas of rainforest, wet sclerophyll, and open forests. Breeding occurs from September to May after heavy rain. From 300 to 600 eggs are deposited in temporary pools and flooded areas, and are laid in clumps among water weeds at the water's surface.

== Similar species ==
Green-thighed frogs are unlikely to be confused with any other species because of the bright colours in the groin and on the thighs and the lack of toe webbing.
