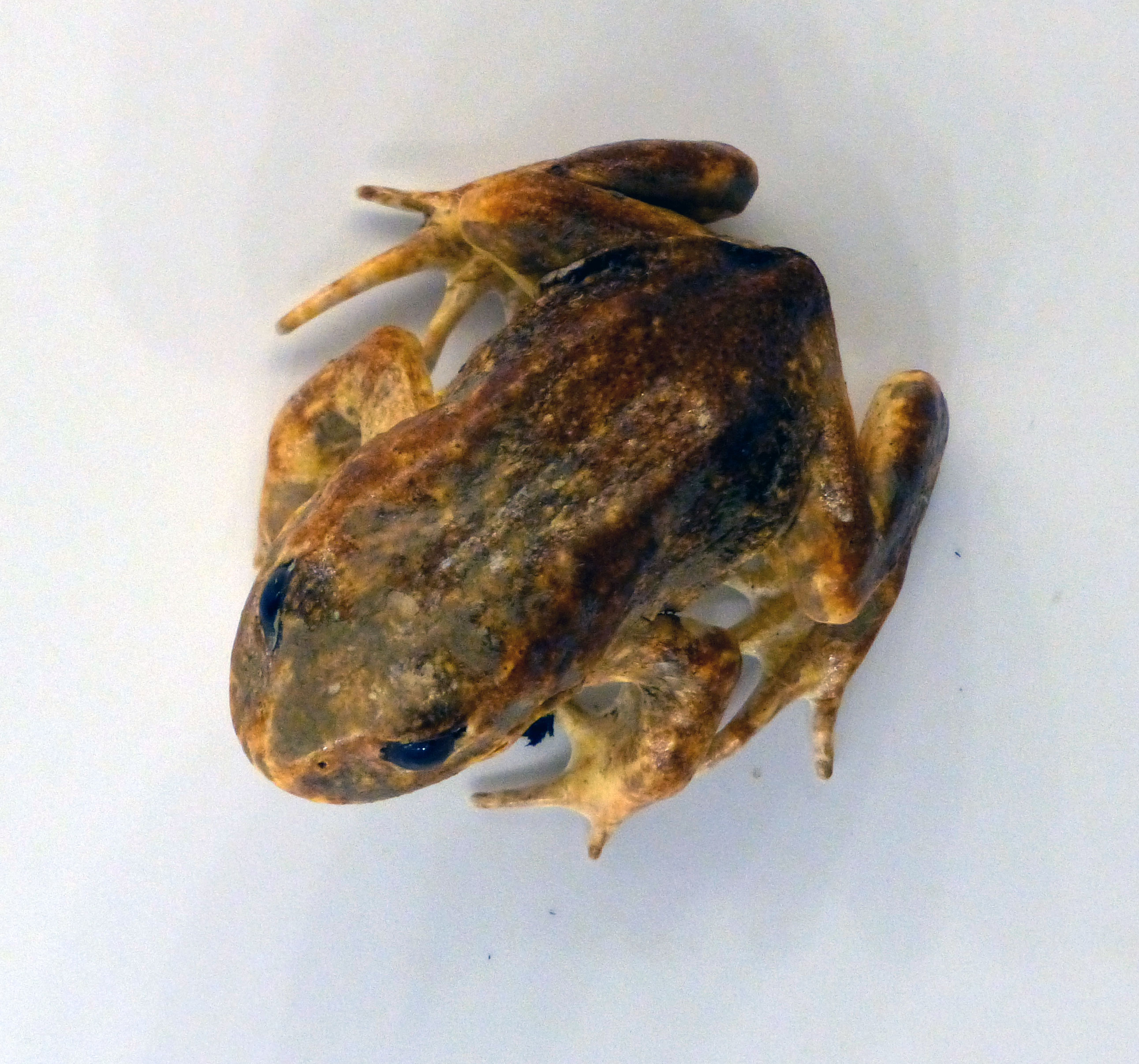

Conservation status
- Critically Endangered (IUCN 3.1)

Scientific classification
- Kingdom: Animalia
- Phylum: Chordata
- Class: Amphibia
- Order: Anura
- Family: Limnodynastidae
- Genus: Philoria
- Species: P. frosti

Binomial name
- Philoria frosti Spencer, 1901
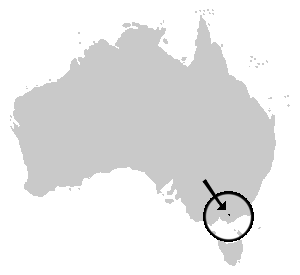
- Range of the Baw Baw Frog

= Baw Baw frog =

Species of amphibian

The Baw Baw frog (Philoria frosti) is a critically endangered species of Australian frog as categorised on the IUCN Red List and listed under the Flora and Fauna Guarantee Act (1988), endemic to Baw Baw National Park. It has suffered a decline in population, mostly due to infection caused by chytrid fungus. Zoos Victoria has undertaken a breeding program to ensure survival of the species which commenced in 2010, and in October 2018 successfully collected the first eggs laid in captivity.

== Taxonomy and etymology ==
The species was described as Philoria frosti by Walter Baldwin Spencer in 1901, honouring Charles Frost, an Australian naturalist. The specimens used in the species description (type series) were provided by Frost, an amateur herpetologist, who recovered five individuals that had been regurgitated by a tiger snake Notechis scutatus.

== Description ==
Adult length is between 42 and 55 millimetres (1.7 and 2.2 in). Adults are dark brown and often have brown to dark brown, yellow flecked bellies. The Baw Baw Frog has a prominent parotoid gland on the shoulders. Unlike most frogs, the Baw Baw frog has unwebbed toes. The species is confined to a small region of safeguarded mountain gully habitat, situated at an altitude ranging from 1000 to 1300 meters, located on the Mt Baw Baw Plateau in the Central Highlands of Victoria, Australia. At hatching, the tadpoles are creamy white and unpigmented, acquiring some colouration and eye pigmentation as they mature. Tadpoles have large yolk sacs and residual mouths, and do not feed until metamorphosis. In contrast to the typical behavior of tadpoles in other frog species, these developing tadpoles do not swim or feed; rather, they rely on nourishment from a yolk sac. Metamorphlings have different colouration to the adults. During winter, they inhabit the space beneath the snow and exhibit higher activity levels compared to many other frogs during colder periods. Egg-laying occurs post-snowmelt, typically in mossy nests or within various crevices, occasionally as deep as one meter below the surface among rocks.

== Habitat and reproduction ==
The breeding environment depends on moist soil saturation and underground water flow beneath plant cover, fallen timber, and rocks, with breeding taking place on a yearly basis. Egg clusters typically consist of 50 to 185 eggs, appearing white and lacking pigmentation. Hatching usually commences approximately 10 days after the eggs are laid and may continue for a duration of up to 5 days.

== Declining population ==
Population estimates have reduced from 15,000 to 10,000 breeding males in 1983 to around 750, or according to Frogs Victoria less than 250 individuals. The decrease is likely caused by chytridiomycosis, which is attributed to the chytrid fungus. This disease can has been related to the diminish of many amphibian populations throughout the world.

== Captive breeding program ==
In order to save the frog from extinction, a self-sustaining captive breeding program was commenced, with Zoos Victoria taking the lead. When the program was started in 2010 almost nothing was known about managing the frogs in captivity.

Zoos Victoria has been researching the effects of food sources and temperature are larvae's growth development. The larvae they raised was at either a low temperature of 12 degrees Celsius or a high temperature of 17 degrees Celsius, with or without substrate that regulated food availability. The researchers measured both body size and the duration until metamorphosis. The research concluded that changing the temperature and food sources could increase the birth rate.

An artificial environment was created in a shipping container named "the Baw Baw Bunker" and the first eggs were collected from the wild in 2011 but were unviable. In 2013, 96 metamorphs were raised from collected eggs. Eleven females were captured from the wild in 2016 for the first time, (Note: Females are difficult to catch because they are elusive and do not call.) and on 22 October 2018 the first eggs were laid in captivity. Researchers planned to place the eggs on a chytrid fungus-free part of Mt Baw Baw within four weeks.

In November 2020, at which time it was estimated that about 1,000 of the frogs remained in the wild, 25 male and 25 female adult frogs were released with radio transmitters on their backs in various specially selected areas on Mt Baw Baw. Researchers hope that the release of the adult frogs, the first time this has been tried, would create a more robust population of the frogs more quickly than by releasing eggs alone.

== See also ==
- IUCN Red List
- Chytridiomycosis
