= Mountain frog =

Conservation status
- Endangered (IUCN 3.1)

Scientific classification
- Kingdom: Animalia
- Phylum: Chordata
- Class: Amphibia
- Order: Anura
- Family: Limnodynastidae
- Genus: Philoria
- Species: P. kundagungan

Binomial name
- Philoria kundagungan (Ingram & Corben, 1975)

Synonyms
- Kyarranus kundagungan Ingram & Corben, 1975

Species of amphibian

The mountain frog (Philoria kundagungan), or red and yellow mountain frog, is a species of frog in the family Limnodynastidae. The scientific name comes from the Gubbi Gubbi language of southern Queensland, 'kunda' meaning mountain and 'gungan' meaning frog.

== Range and habitat ==
It is endemic to eastern Australia. Its natural habitats are subtropical montane rainforests and rivers. It lives in remnant rainforest pockets in the mountains of south-east Queensland and north-eastern New South Wales, including the Main Range and Teviot Range, and its distribution is severely fragmented. The mountain frog is known to be found on moist leaves and vegetation; they are also found near creeks or seepage areas.

The mountain frog is endangered by habitat loss caused by logging. The species is also threatened by disturbances from upstream that affect hydrological processes or water quality.

== Sources ==
- Hero, J.-M.; Meyer, E.; Clarke, J. (2004). "Philoria kundagungan". IUCN Red List of Threatened Species. 2004 e.T54353A11128182. doi:10.2305/IUCN.UK.2004.RLTS.T54353A11128182.en.
