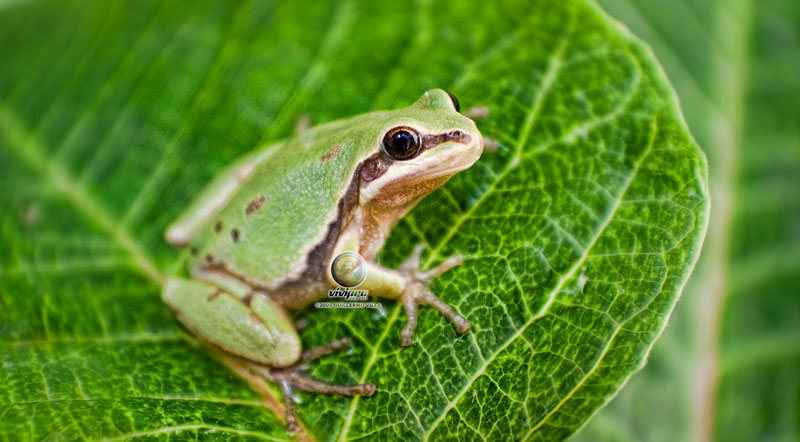

Conservation status
- Least Concern (IUCN 3.1)

Scientific classification
- Kingdom: Animalia
- Phylum: Chordata
- Class: Amphibia
- Order: Anura
- Family: Hylidae
- Genus: Dryophytes
- Species: D. eximius

Binomial name
- Dryophytes eximius (Baird, 1854)

Synonyms
- Hyla eximia Baird, 1854

= Dryophytes eximius =

Mountain tree frog

Species of amphibian

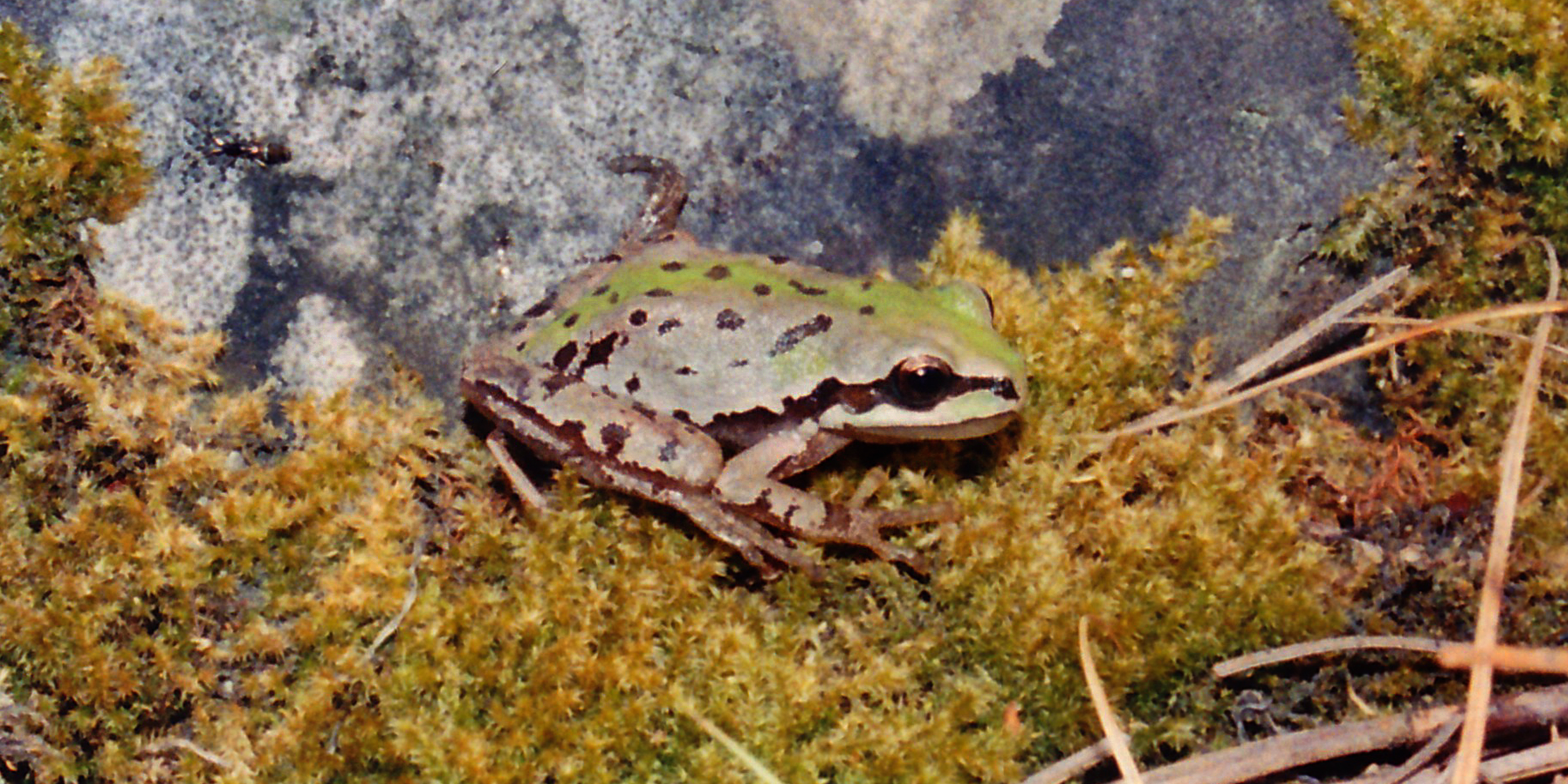
Mountain Treefrog, (Dryophytes eximius), Municipality of Gómez Farías, Tamaulipas, Mexico (27 May 2005).

Dryophytes eximius, commonly known as the mountain tree frog, is a species of frog in the family Hylidae endemic to Mexico. Its natural habitats are mesquite grasslands, scrub forests, and pine-oak forests. It is a widely distributed species that faces no major threats.

Dryophytes eximius is listed as the state amphibian of Arizona. As currently circumscribed, Dryophytes eximius does not occur in Arizona. Dryophytes wrightorum, the Wright's mountain tree frog, which has previously been regarded as a synonym of Dryophytes eximius does occur in Arizona.
