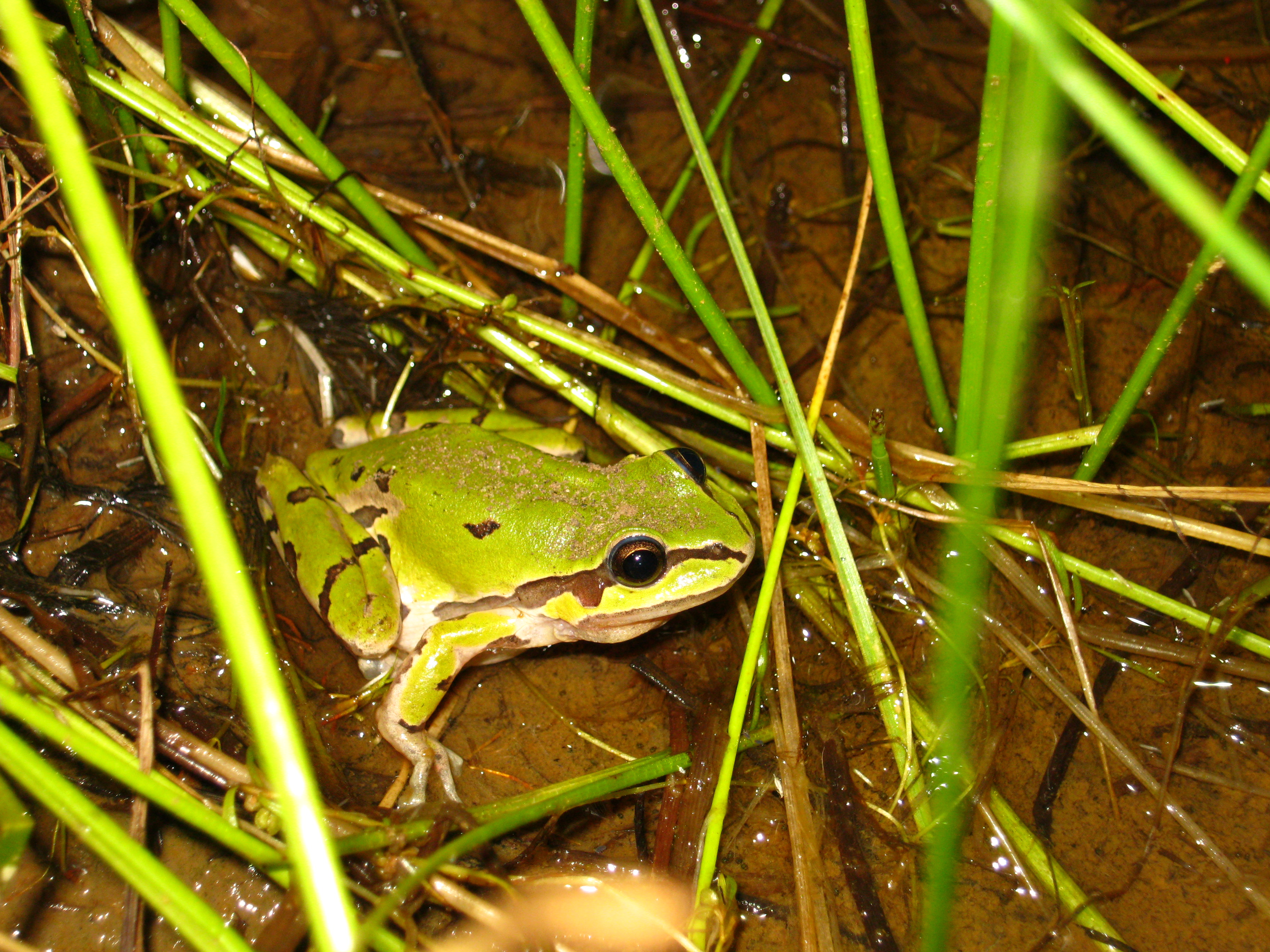

Conservation status
- Least Concern (IUCN 3.1)

Scientific classification
- Kingdom: Animalia
- Phylum: Chordata
- Class: Amphibia
- Order: Anura
- Family: Hylidae
- Genus: Dryophytes
- Species: D. wrightorum

Binomial name
- Dryophytes wrightorum (Taylor, 1939)

Synonyms
- Hyla wrightorum Taylor, 1939

= Wright's mountain tree frog =

Species of amphibian

Wright's mountain tree frog (Dryophytes wrightorum) is a species of frog in the family Hylidae found in Mexico and the United States. Its natural habitats are temperate forests, temperate grassland, rivers, and freshwater marshes. Dryophytes wrightorum has been regarded as a synonym of Dryophytes eximius, the mountain tree frog, which is listed as the state amphibian of Arizona. As presently circumscribed, Dryophytes eximius is endemic to Mexico and does not occur in Arizona. It is the state amphibian of Arizona.
