= Loveridge's frog =

Conservation status
- Endangered (IUCN 3.1)

Scientific classification
- Kingdom: Animalia
- Phylum: Chordata
- Class: Amphibia
- Order: Anura
- Family: Limnodynastidae
- Genus: Philoria
- Species: P. loveridgei

Binomial name
- Philoria loveridgei Parker, 1940

Synonyms
- Kyarranus loveridgei (Parker, 1940)

Species of amphibian

Loveridge's frog (Philoria loveridgei), also known as the masked mountain frog, is a species of frogs in the family Limnodynastidae.

It is endemic to Australia.

Its natural habitats are subtropical and tropical moist lowland forests, subtropical and tropical moist montane forests, and streams.

They are primarily found in northeastern New South Wales and southeastern Queensland, inhabiting the headwaters of rainforest streams, where it lays its eggs in nests in the ground.

This species demonstrates unique reproductive behaviors, including the formation of jelly-like nests with the jelly providing a safe space for embryos to develop in.

It is threatened by habitat loss and by infection of the amphibian chytrid fungus. Loveridge's frog is named in honour of British herpetologist, Arthur Loveridge.
