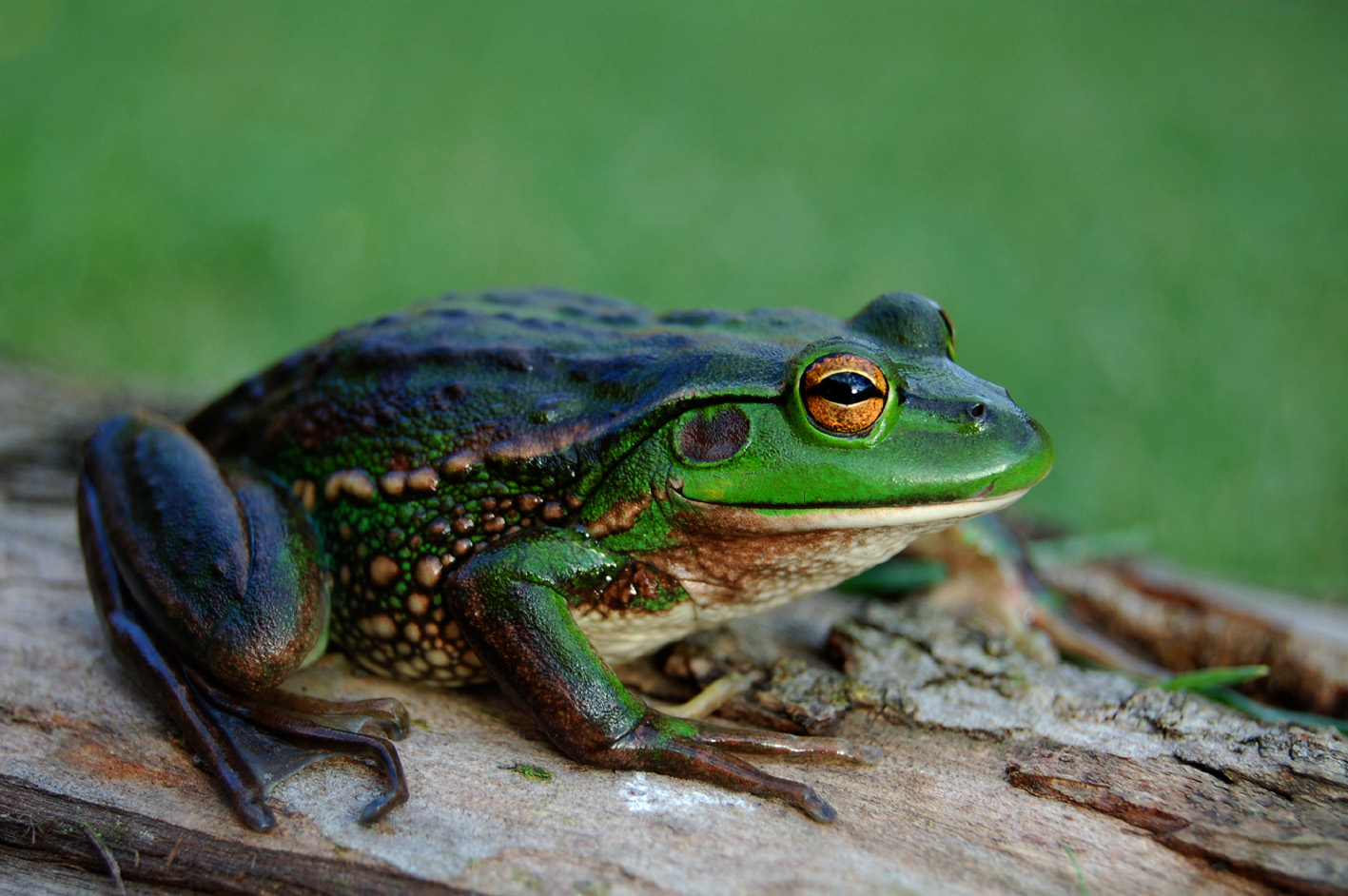

Conservation status
- Vulnerable (IUCN 3.1)

Scientific classification
- Kingdom: Animalia
- Phylum: Chordata
- Class: Amphibia
- Order: Anura
- Family: Pelodryadidae
- Genus: Ranoidea
- Species: R. raniformis

Binomial name
- Ranoidea raniformis Keferstein, 1867
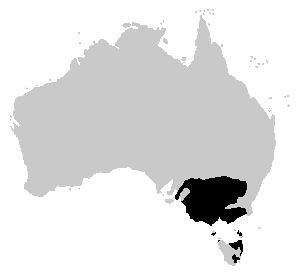
- Native range

Synonyms
- Litoria raniformis

= Growling grass frog =

Species of amphibian

The growling grass frog (Ranoidea raniformis), also commonly known as the southern bell frog, warty swamp frog and erroneously as the green frog, is a species of ground-dwelling tree frog native to southeastern Australia, ranging from southern South Australia along the Murray River though Victoria to New South Wales, with populations through Tasmania. This species' common names vary between states; the name southern bell frog applies in New South Wales and South Australia, growling grass frog in Victoria, and green and gold frog in Tasmania. This species has been introduced to New Zealand.

== Description ==
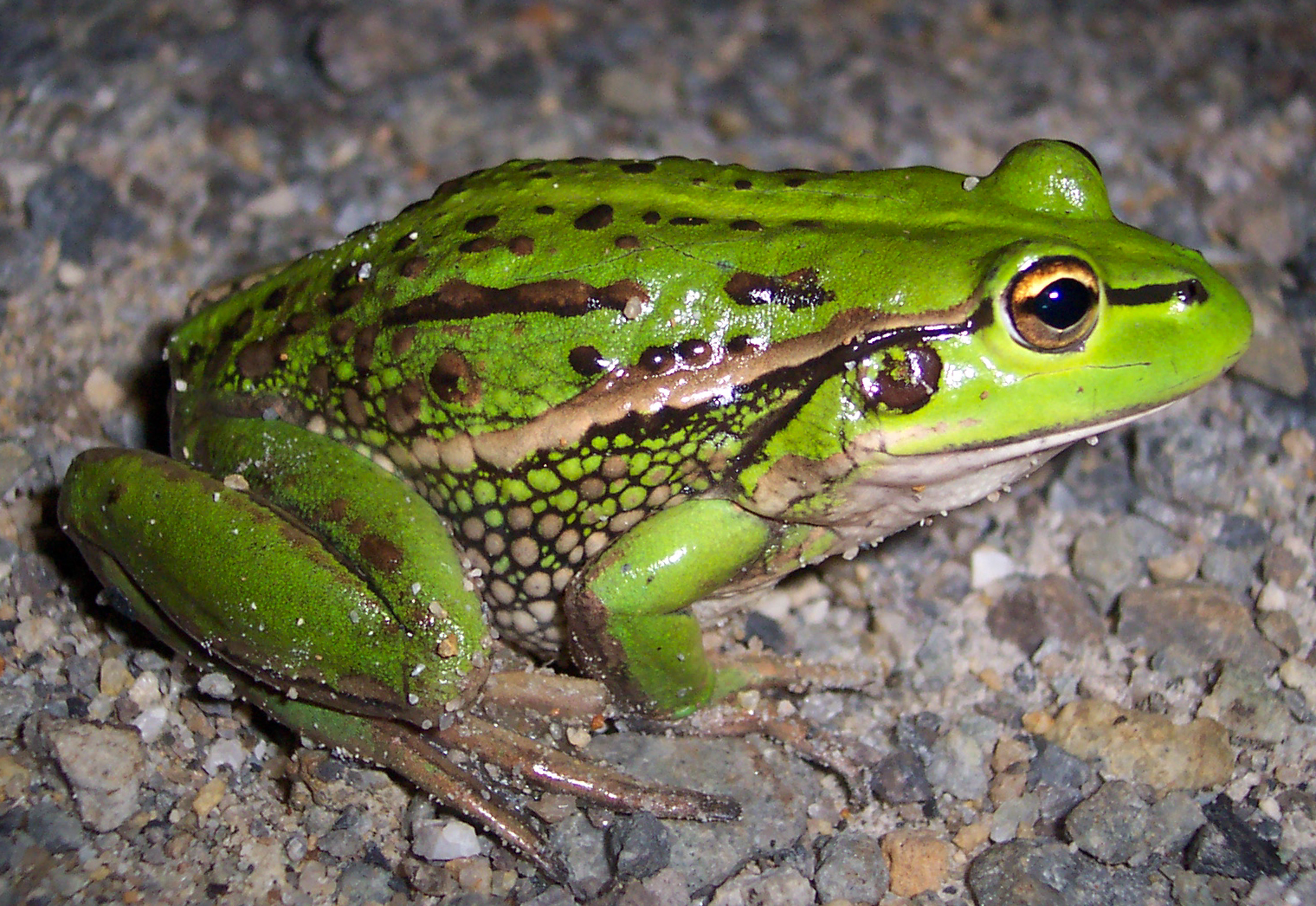
A light-green Litoria raniformis

The growling grass frog is a very large, ground-dwelling tree frog up to 10 cm (almost 4 in) from snout to vent. It is a mottled bright green and bronze colour above, often with dark brown enameled bumps. It has a pale cream underside, with a faint cobbling pattern. A pale stripe runs from the side of the head down the flanks as a skin fold. The thighs are blue-green in colour.

There are a series of shallow bumps over its back. This frog closely resembles the green and golden bell frog (Ranoidea aurea), but is distinguished by the shallow bumps on its back, a shorter call, and a slightly different head and snout shape. The tympanum is visible in these frogs.

The tadpoles are also very large (up to 9.5 cm or 3.7 in). The tadpoles often have a coppery pigment along their sides and an iridescent green sheen along their backbones.

== Ecology and behaviour ==
This species is associated with large swamps, permanent dam impoundments, ponds, and lakes (particularly ones with reeds) in woodland, shrubland, open and coastal areas.

This frog is an agile climber, but is most often found among dense reeds or along swampy grasslands. It hunts and basks in the sun during the day. Growling grass frogs reportedly hunt other frogs by zoning into the sound of their calls.

The call is a three part moaning "craw-ork ar-ar", rising and then falling in tone (described as the sound of a duck or goose being strangled). The males develop black, rough nuptial pads on their thumbs during the breeding season, which occurs during spring through to late summer. Females have the ability to hiss when threatened. The eggs (up to several thousand) are distributed in a loose pile. The tadpole stage lasts approximately 12 weeks.

This frog has declined across much of its range and has disappeared altogether from some regions (such as the Australian Capital Territory and the lowest 200 KM of the River Murray). Several populations along the River Murray have been stabilised through the regular managed delivery of water to breeding locations (for example in the Lower Murrumbidgee catchment in New South Wales and the Riverland region of South Australia). Frogs are regularly recorded in suburban Melbourne and Geelong, with similar records from regional cities. Animals released from the pet trade established in the Adelaide Hills in the 1990s but this population is now extinct.

== Distribution ==
The species is native to southeastern Australia, and can also be found in Tasmania. The species was introduced to New Zealand in 1867 by the Canterbury Acclimatisation Society, and has since become widely distributed across both the North Island and South Island.

== As a pet ==
It is kept as a pet; in Australia, this animal may be kept in captivity with the appropriate permit.
