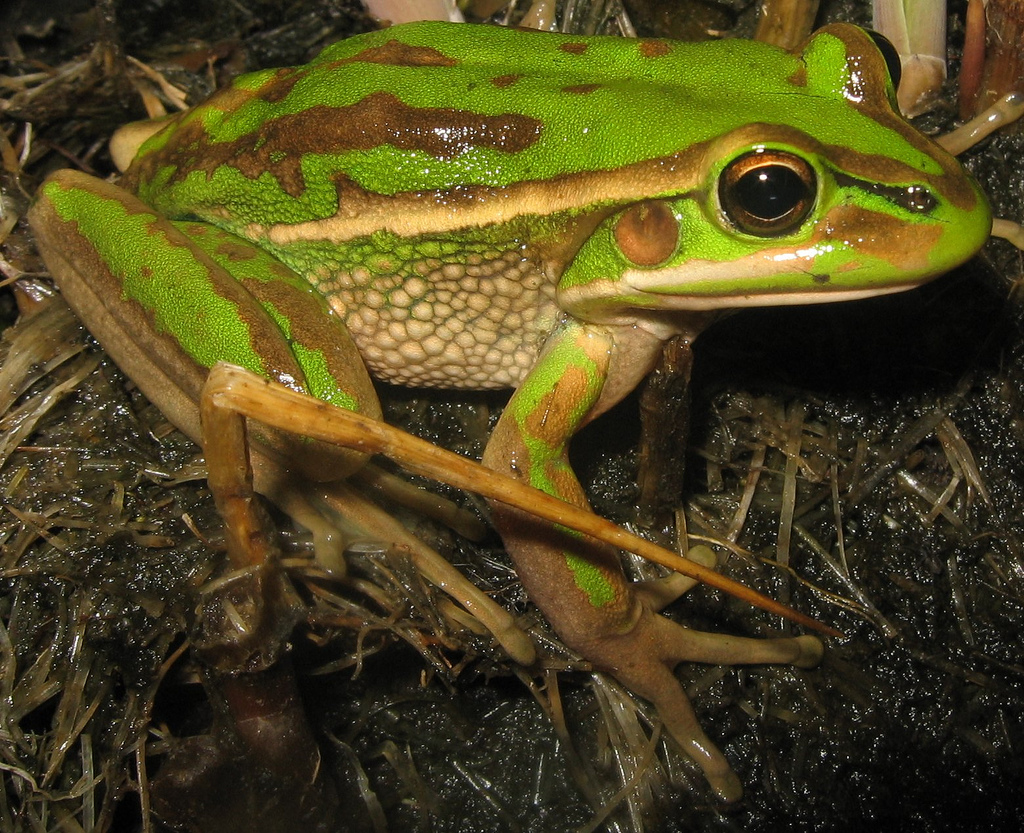
- Ranoidea aurea, the type species

Scientific classification
- Kingdom: Animalia
- Phylum: Chordata
- Class: Amphibia
- Order: Anura
- Family: Pelodryadidae
- Subfamily: Pelodryadinae
- Genus: Ranoidea (Tschudi, 1838)

Type species
- Ranoidea jacksoniensis Tschudi, 1838

Synonyms
- List: Polyphone Gistel, 1848; Ranhyla M'Coy, 1867; Chirodryas Keferstein, 1867); Fanchonia Werner, 1893

= Ranoidea (genus) =

Genus of amphibians

Ranoidea is a genus of frogs in the family Pelodryadidae. They are found across the temperate areas of south-eastern and south-western Australia.

== Taxonomy ==
Species in this genus were until recently placed in the then-paraphyletic genus Litoria; many of them had been placed in even larger Hyla before. In 2006, Frost and colleague synonymised Nyctimystes with Litoria to make a monophyletic Litoria within a monotypic Pelodryadinae. Later, in 2016, Duellman and colleagues restored Nyctimystes and moved some of the remaining Litoria species to the resurrected genus Dryopsophus. However, Frost in Amphibian Species of the World argued that Ranoidea the oldest available name for these species and replaced genus Dryopsophus with Ranoidea.

A recent phylogenomic analysis of family Pelodryadidae has proposed a major taxonomic revision, recognising 35 genera, including 12 for the species that were briefly treated as Ranoidea.

== Description and ecology ==
Ranoidea are terrestrial and semi-aquatic frogs that primarily breed in ephemeral and permanent waterbodies, in grasslands, riverine billabongs and forests. Most species are capable of adapting to human disturbance of natural habitats, though the south-eastern species have been severely affected by chytridiomycosis. The common names of this group often reflect the male breeding calls, such as the green and golden bell frog, the motorbike frog and growling grass frog.

== Species ==
The following species are recognised in the genus Ranoidea:

- Ranoidea aurea (Lesson, 1829)
- Ranoidea castanea (Steindachner, 1867)
- Ranoidea cyclorhynchus (Boulenger, 1882)
- Ranoidea moorei (Copland, 1957)
- Ranoidea raniformis (Keferstein, 1867)
