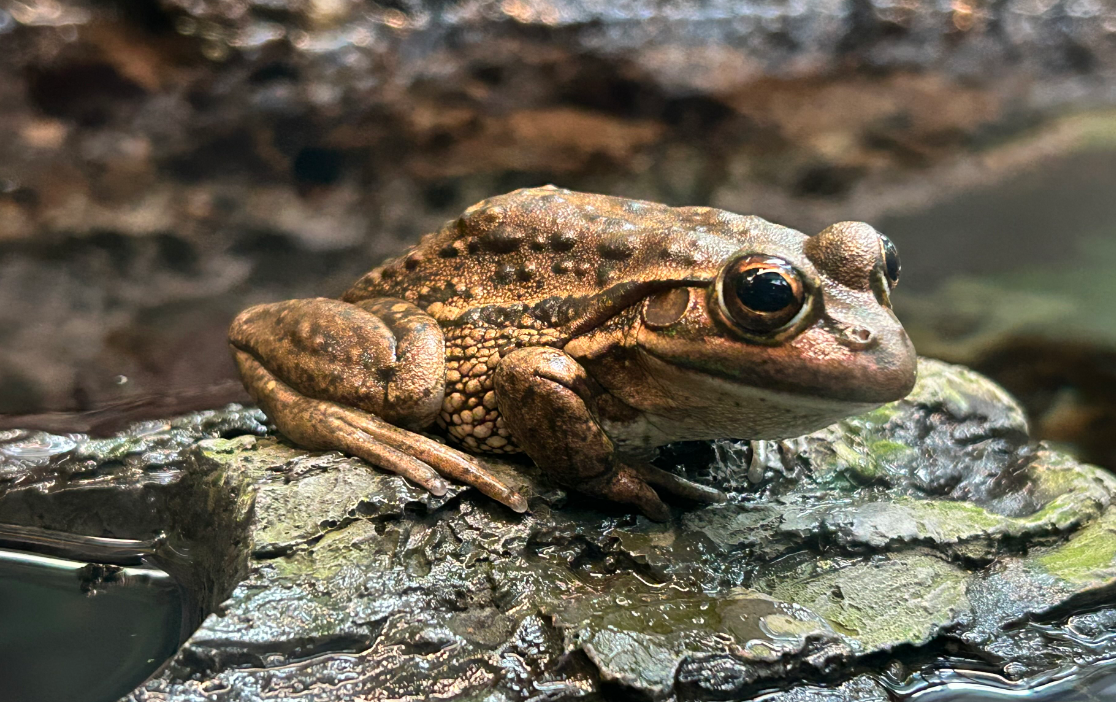

Conservation status
- Critically endangered, possibly extinct (IUCN 3.1)

Scientific classification
- Kingdom: Animalia
- Phylum: Chordata
- Class: Amphibia
- Order: Anura
- Family: Pelodryadidae
- Genus: Ranoidea
- Species: R. castanea

Binomial name
- Ranoidea castanea (Steindachner, 1867)

Synonyms
- Hyla castanea Steindachner, 1867; Litoria flavipunctata Courtice and Grigg, 1975; Litoria castanea Steindachner, 1867

= Yellow-spotted bell frog =

Species of frog

The yellow-spotted bell frog (Ranoidea castanea), also known as the yellow-spotted tree frog, New England swamp frog, or tablelands bell frog, is a species of frog in the family Pelodryadidae. It is a critically endangered species of frog that is endemic to south-eastern Australia.

== Description ==
The yellow-spotted bell frog is distinguished by cream markings on its thighs. Its overall colour is pale green or golden brown and the dark to black spots are highlighted by the bronze patches. The toes are entirely webbed.

== Distribution and habitat ==
The yellow-spotted bell frog is endemic to the New England Tablelands bioregion of south-eastern Australia.

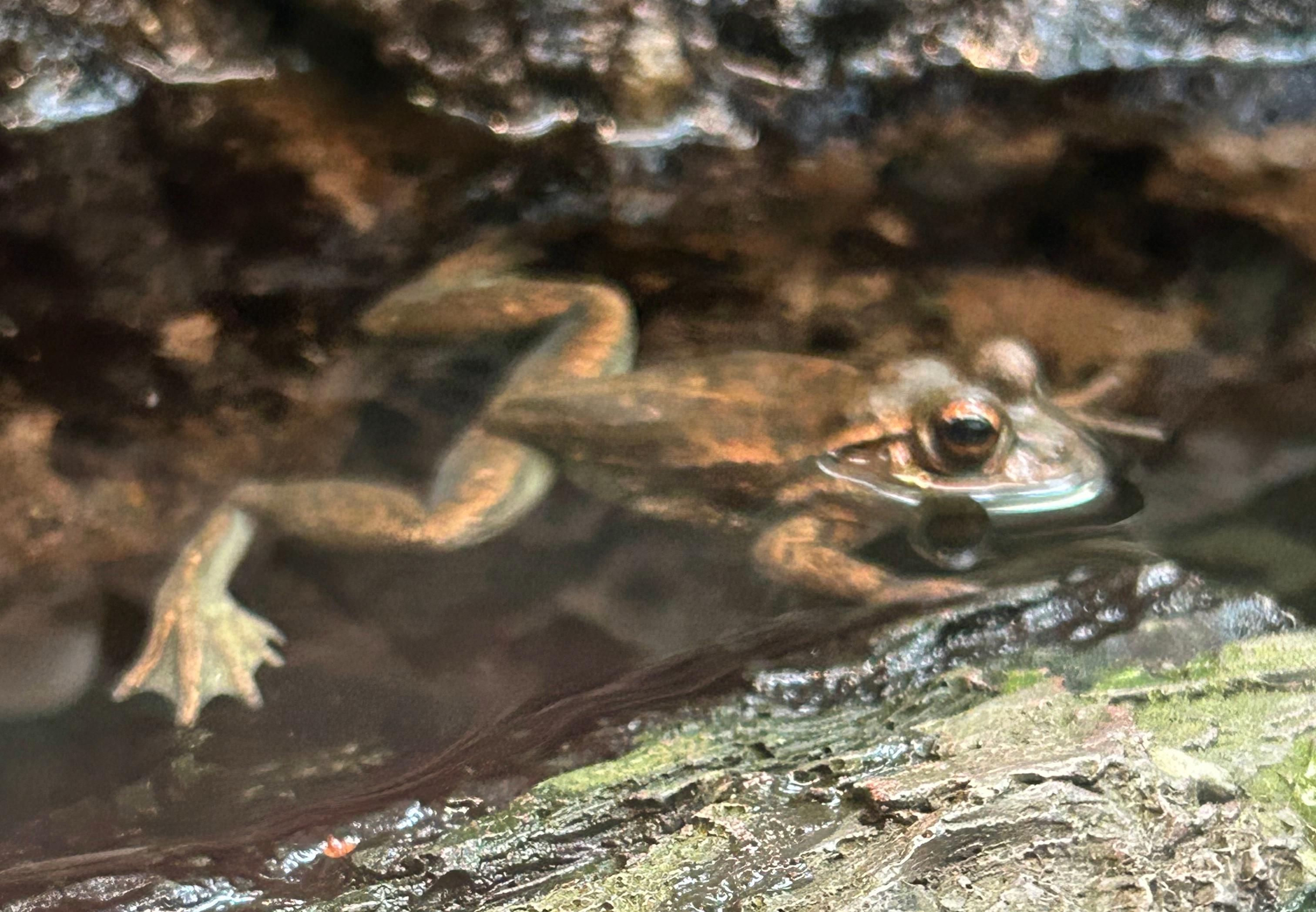
Swimming in an exhibit at Taronga Zoo

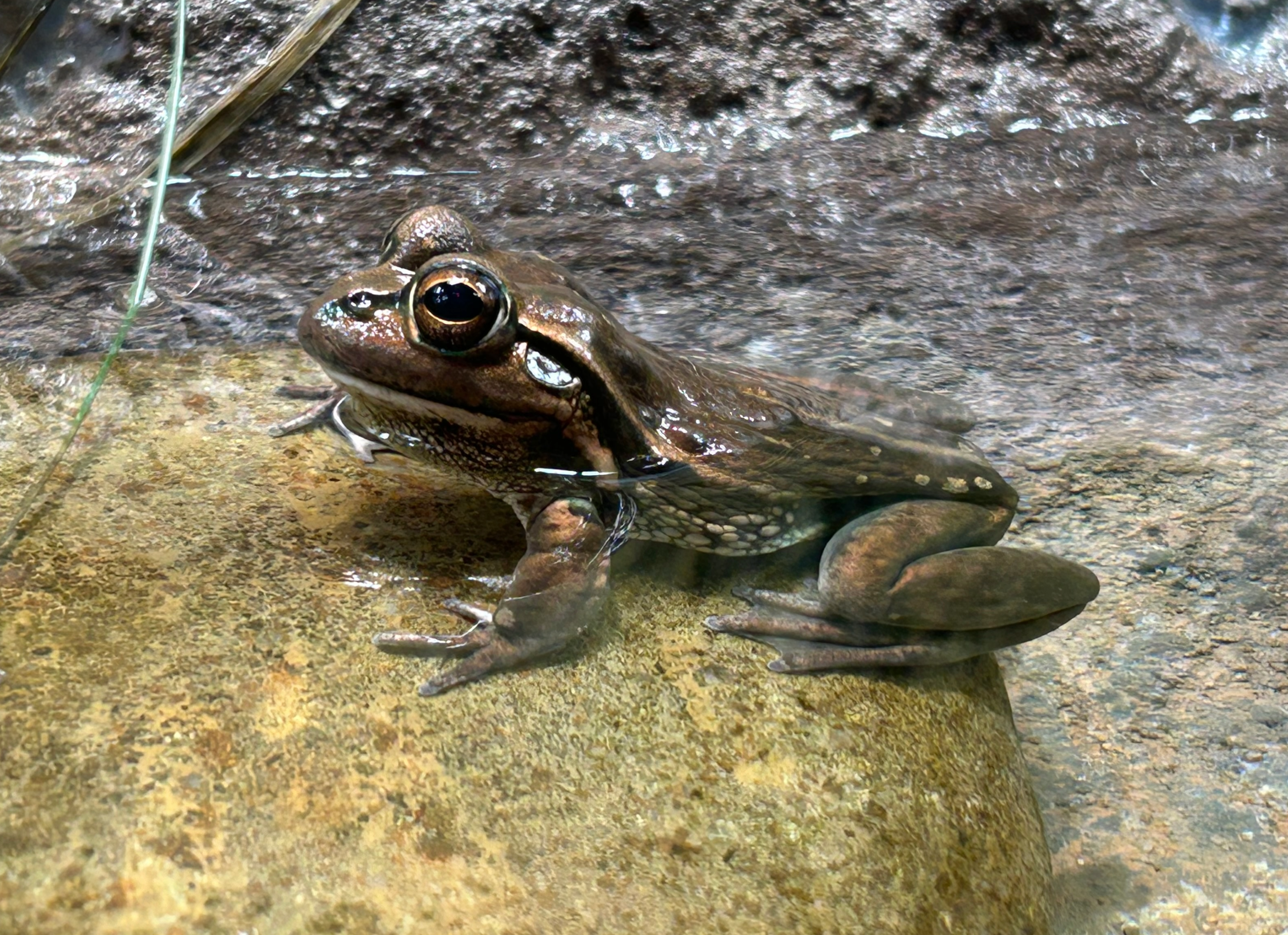

The species favours permanent water bodies and its natural habitats are temperate grassland, rivers, intermittent rivers, swamps, freshwater lakes, intermittent freshwater lakes, freshwater marshes, intermittent freshwater marshes, and ponds.

== Conservation ==
No recorded sighting had been made since 1980, and by 2004 the species was considered as possibly extinct. The reasons behind its drastic decline are unclear, but the disease chytridiomycosis is suspected to have played a major role. However, in late 2009 New South Wales Fisheries field scientist Luke Pearce located a surviving population of the frogs. Scientists acted quickly to establish a small "insurance" colony. Soon after, the wild colony was eradicated due to two consecutive floods and an outbreak of chytrid fungus. Following a breeding program at Sydney's Taronga Zoo, in early 2018, a colony of yellow-spotted bell frogs was released in a secret location in the New South Wales' southern tablelands.
