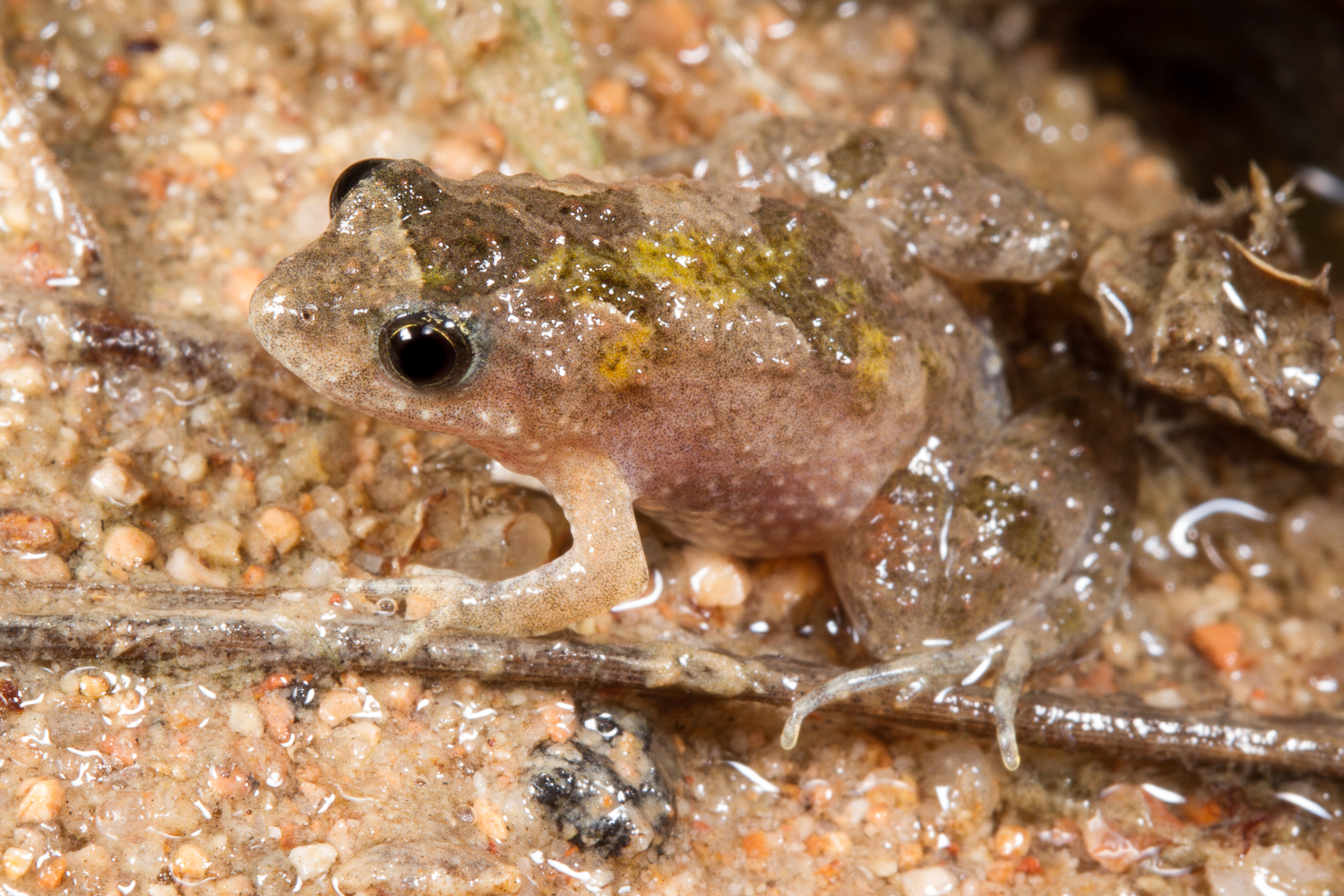
- Desert froglet

Conservation status
- Least Concern (IUCN 3.1)

Scientific classification
- Kingdom: Animalia
- Phylum: Chordata
- Class: Amphibia
- Order: Anura
- Family: Myobatrachidae
- Genus: Crinia
- Species: C. deserticola

Binomial name
- Crinia deserticola (Liem & Ingram, 1977)
- Distribution of the desert froglet

Synonyms
- Ranidella deserticola Liem and Ingram, 1977

= Desert froglet =

Species of frog

The desert froglet, chirping froglet, or sparrow froglet (Crinia deserticola) is a species of frog in the family Myobatrachidae, endemic to Australia. Desert froglets occur mainly in dry or moist savanna habitats, principally from the mid-western border of Northern Territory, south-east into western Queensland and New South Wales and the north-east corner of South Australia. They can also be found along the Queensland coast where it has been recorded between Townsville and Cooktown, and as far south as Hervey Bay (300 km north of Brisbane).

== Taxonomy ==
=== General ===
The desert froglet is a member of the family Myobatrachidae. However debate exists about its scientific and common names. For instance, because comparative phylogeny studies of Crinia species are not comprehensive, there is debate over the taxonomic accuracy of its species groupings. One exception is the synonymisation of the genus Ranidella with Crinia based on morphological data and serum albumin similarities with R.signifera and C.signifera. In addition, although the term 'froglet' may seem suited as a general descriptor of smaller species, further taxonomic research of Crinia species, such as the desert froglet, is needed to clarify the relevancy of this term.

=== Genetic records ===
Crinia deserticola isolate SAMAR45118 tRNA-Gln and tRNA-Met genes, complete sequence; and NADH dehydrogenase subunit 2 (ND2) gene, partial cds; mitochondrial
- 650 bp linear DNA
- Accession: JX473815.1 GI: 401064967

Crinia deserticola isolate SAMAR52124 tRNA-Gln and tRNA-Met genes, complete sequence; and NADH dehydrogenase subunit 2 (ND2) gene, partial cds; mitochondrial

- 650 bp linear DNA
- Accession: JX473814.1 GI: 401064965

Crinia deserticola 658 mitochondrial partial nadh4 gene for NADH dehydrogenase subunit 4

- 408 bp linear DNA
- Accession: AJ269697.1 GI: 7799385

Crinia deserticola 658 mitochondrial partial 16S rRNA gene

- 468 bp linear DNA
- Accession: AJ269696.1 GI: 7799384

== Description ==
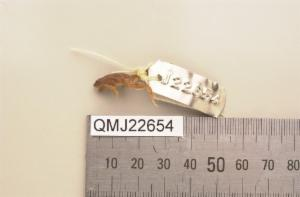
Queensland museum specimen

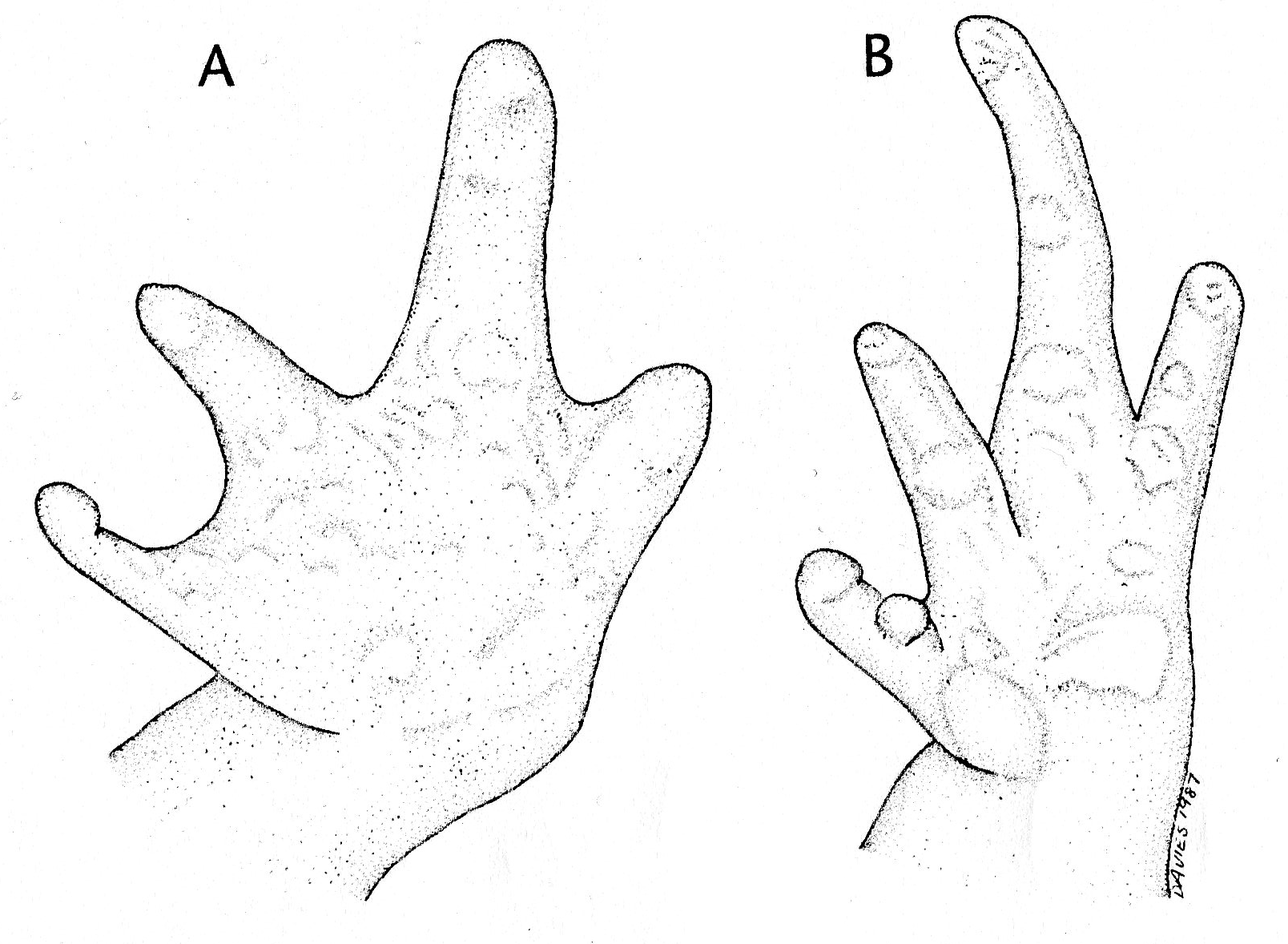
Hands of: (A) Arenophyrne rotunda, which uses them for burrowing and (B) Crinia deserticolca, which does not burrow.

The desert froglet is a ground dwelling frog with skin colour, texture and pattern variation common to other Crinia species. Generally the belly of adults is granular (not blotchy pink like the Tasmanian froglet). The male belly is uniformly white or grey in colour, and possibly flecked grey, whereas the female belly is either white, speckled, or boldly blotched with black or grey.

The throat of adults lack a median white line, unlike the wallum froglet; with throats of breeding males white or grey and the chin completely dark. Spots are either inconspicuous or absent on the chest of both genders.

Also, adults have distinct dermal fringes on their toes and the hind side of their thighs lack the pink or red coloration of the quacking frog. The tympanum is obscure but not hidden unlike the remote froglet. The length of the adult snout-vent is usually less than 18 mm, which is shorter than the eastern sign-bearing froglet, and is a pale brown colour or slightly patterned. Additional diagnostic descriptors include: bluntly rounded snout, evenly rounded canthus rostralis, outwardly sloping loreal region, bluntly pointed head (dorsal view), lacks supratympanic fold, elongated tongue, lacks vomerine teeth, toothed upper jaw, vocal sac with slit-like openings on the floor of the mouth.

The distal segment of fingers is blunt, not expanded, with roundish sub-articular tubercles (one on 1st and 2nd fingers; two on 3rd and 4th fingers), supernumerary tubercles are present on each palm, two metacarpal tubercles are present, webbing is absent as is the nuptial pad, and subcutaneous glands are present on the base of the 1st finger.

Hind limbs are robust with blunt digital segmentation of toes with broad fringes and rounded metatarsal tubercles, supernumerary tubercles are absent indicating the desert froglet does not burrow.

Males mature at about 13.0–18.0 cm in length whereas females grow slightly larger to 13.0–18.0 cm.

== Distribution and habitat ==
- Distribution map.

Desert froglets are found in arid regions, especially in areas of black soil, extending across the Australian continent from the Kimberley region to the north-west of New South Wales and much of Queensland. The species is often associated with static, temporary or permanent water bodies where it shelters under leaves. They have also been located within artificial habitats such as farm dams, and sheltering under corrugated iron and timber piles.

== Reproduction ==
=== Mating call ===
The desert froglet is recognised by the 'melodious chirping' call of the adult male, which sounds similar to a house sparrow. Each call consists of a repeating pattern: two pulses of 60 milliseconds each and 4000 hertz, which is immediately followed by two additional double pulses of decreasing energy and quickening rate, and a brief pause. Calls are distinct from the shorter creaking call of Sloane's froglet, stretched out call of the eastern sign-bearing froglet, lower pitch of the wallum froglet, and grating sounds of the common eastern froglet.

Calling males can be found either hiding under vegetation or exposed at water edges.

=== Life history ===
Spawns of small eggs are laid as submerged clumps either directly within the water or attached to submerged vegetation. Eggs are black at the animal pole and cream at the vegetal.

Tadpole appearance is the same as the Eastern sign-bearing froglet and Common eastern froglet: dark brown in colour, a dextral anal opening, sinistral spiracle, blunt tail, labial papillar row interrupted on anterior and posterior portions, and a labial tooth row pattern of I, 1/1, II.

== Threats ==
Although the desert froglet is not considered to be at threat of extinction, alterations to inland waters have potential to impact their populations, especially when water bodies are isolated and individuals cannot disperse to additional sources. Under these circumstances, any activity that negatively impacts these water bodies may cause species decline, including drinking, fouling and grazing by livestock and feral animals, road construction, non-native plants, groundwater extraction, pollution, tourism, mining, and long-term changes in weather patterns.
