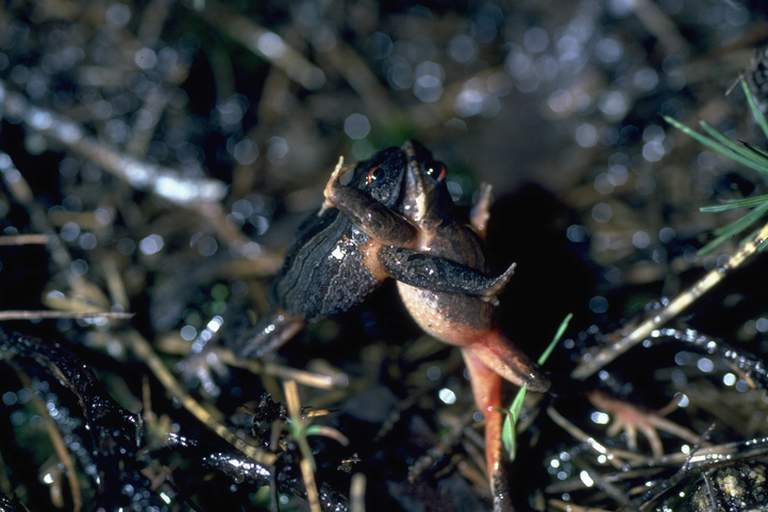

Conservation status
- Near Threatened (IUCN 3.1)

Scientific classification
- Kingdom: Animalia
- Phylum: Chordata
- Class: Amphibia
- Order: Anura
- Family: Myobatrachidae
- Genus: Crinia
- Species: C. georgiana

Binomial name
- Crinia georgiana Tschudi, 1838

= Quacking frog =

Species of amphibian

The quacking frog (Crinia georgiana), also known as the red-thighed froglet due to its legs tending to be bright red, is a species of frog from the Myobatrachidae family and is in a clad with five other species. The frog is well known for the sound it produces which resembles a quack. It has up to 11 notes and can change the notes in their call. It has larger testes compared to other frogs within the genus and has started to be used in experiments. This frog is found in southwest Australia. It is found in ponds, pools, and other moisture filled areas. These frogs engage in polyandry and can result in multiple paternity of its offspring. Additionally, the tadpoles of this species can change the rate they metamorphosize depending on the conditions. The males tend to have larger arm girth and can adopt different mating strategies depending on size. The mating strategy is dependent on male density. The frogs also vary in terms of colour and texture of its skin. The tadpoles are generally golden with transparent tails.

== Description ==
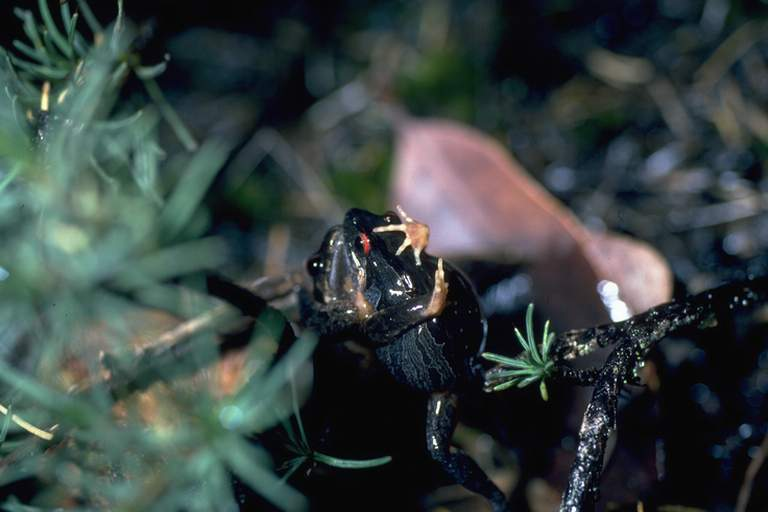
Two male quacking frogs wrestling

Crinia georgiana is a short or squat froglet that appears flattened and has a large head and short limbs. Characteristic of its family, this frog has long and unwebbed fingers and toes. The dorsal skin can be smooth, but it is usually bumpy or tubercular, while the underside is finely granular. The genus is polymorphic, however, meaning there is great variation in colour and texture of the skin within each species. In addition, some individuals may have a backside with skin folds, while others do not. Its colouring ranges from orange to brown to almost black on its back and may include brown marbling or brown stripes on either side of its back, which aid in camouflage. The belly of males is dirty-grey, while females have a bright white abdomen; both have a white spot at the base of each limb. The groin and anterior and posterior surfaces of the thigh are bright red and the upper eyelids are either red or golden. Its hands are pale in colour. These traits are characteristic of the quacking frog and make it easily distinguishable from other species. Tadpoles are golden in colour and their tail is transparent.

Crinia georgiana is unique compared to other species in the same genus as the testes' mass is significantly larger. This is attributed to extensive levels of sperm competition. The males of this species tend to have an arm girth that is greater than female arm girth. The froglet also has vomerine teeth. It is one of the only frogs within Myobatrachidae that have a variable note number.

=== Size ===
Females are usually 30–36 mm, while males most often range from 24 to 32 mm, although the smallest calling males can be as small as 20 mm. Although the difference in size between males and females is not significant enough to constitute dimorphism, there is an unusually large variation in size of males in this species, which may be attributed to pressures of sexual selection. When tadpoles hatch, they tend to be 7 mm from snout to tail and can reach 20.5 mm prior to metamorphosis.

== Population structure, speciation, and phylogeny ==
=== Phylogeny and close relatives ===
There has been debate regarding the placement of species in the Crinia genus. Due to the distinctiveness of Crinia georgiana, the other species within the group were organized as either C. signifera or C. insignifera. C. georgiana does not form a distinct clade from other Crinia species. The sister group of the Crinia clade containing Crinia georgiana is the clade containing C. parinsignifera, with a difference at one branch. The clade contains C. georgiana, C. insignifera, C. glauerti, C. sloanei, C. subinsignifera, and C. pseudinsignifera; this meaning that C. georgiana is a sister taxon to five other Crinia species. The presence of vomerine teeth is one of the features used in the classification and differentiation of Crinia georgiana from other species. Based on calculations from the genetic distance and immunological distance, the divergence of C. signifera to C. georgiana is 6 million years, with the possibility of the divergence occurring due to exploitation of drier habitats.

== Etymology ==
Quacking frogs are also called red-thighed froglets. Quacking frogs were first located near Albany; thus, they were named after King George Sound.

== Habitat and distribution ==
=== Habitat ===
Because water is essential to this species, it is confined to areas of the coastal plains and forests where water is abundant particularly in winter, when breeding occurs. It is often found in shallow water near sandstone settlements or in marshy bogs. In addition, the quacking frog is known to live amongst vegetation or in habitats that result from the activity of humans such as agricultural lands and rural gardens where water is likely to be plentiful.

=== Distribution ===
This froglet is endemic to Australia, and is found only in southwest Western Australia from Gingin in the north, inland to Dumbleyung and east to Cape Le Grand. Most are distributed along the coast, with very few inland due to the necessity of water for survival, especially during breeding, which occurs in water.

It is estimated that there are more than 50,000 adults currently present with the population size remaining stable or increasing slightly. Crinia georgiana is classified as a popular species.

== Conservation status ==
The quacking frog is listed as Least Concern in terms of its conservation status based on its distribution and presumably large population. Its status is not currently determined to be threatened, though habitat loss due to human settlement and development along the coast of Western Australia may later pose a threat. Fortunately, much of its range is coincidentally located in protected areas, which may alleviate the effects of this threat. However, fungal pathogens have been found in some specimens, so disease may endanger their status in the future.

== Human interaction ==
From this frog, Crinia angiotensin II was isolated from its skin. Recent research has shown that this hormone can be used on other animals. This results from some research which indicated that the Crinia angiotensin II injected via intracerebroventricular route produces a similar effect to intravenous angiotensin II as it prompted water intake in pigeons. When Crinia angiotensin II was injected intravenously in rats and pigeons, it results in a hypertensive response like that of angiotensin II. This means that Crinia angiotensin II behaves similarly to angiotensin II in that it induces the body to increase blood pressure, body water and sodium content.

== Diet and feeding habits ==
In general, the diet of a frog is largely made up of insects, although mites, snails, earthworms, spiders, and other small animals are also consumed. Smaller frogs risk being eaten by larger frogs, as cannibalism is not uncommon. While larger frogs will sometimes feed on fish, it does not appear that this is prevalent among Crinia georgiana. Occasionally, grass, seeds, petals, and other vegetation will be found in the stomachs of frogs, but this is assumed to be accidental. In other words, the frog eats the plants only because other prey was resting on it.

Most frogs catch their prey via a flick of their tongue. The tongue is coated in a sticky secretion, which allows for the adhesion of the prey to the tongue. The catch is then taken into the mouth and swallowed right away, as frogs do not chew their food and many do not even have teeth. Members of Crinia do have vomerine teeth, which are pairs of teeth-like plates on the roof of the mouth that slant inward, but they appear to be rather unimportant. Once the food is in the stomach, the stomach compresses and abdominal muscles aid in digestion and expulsion of waste.

== Call ==
The call of the quacking frog, just as its name suggests, is described as closely resembling the quack of a duck. There are usually 1–4 quacks in a sequence, but there can be up to 12 and males will respond to the calls of other males with the same amount of notes. The calls are used to attract females who are ready to mate. The call is distinct and loud, and these frogs will respond to imitations of their call.

Male Crinia georgiana emit calls that consist of 1-11 notes. However, there is variation in the number of notes that are produced, and this is dependent on stimuli. Using synthetic calls of 2 notes and 4 notes in experiments, it was shown that males match the number of notes. However, in experiments with a 1 note synthetic stimuli, more than 1 note was produced by the male quacking frog. In an experiment where 8 notes of synthetic stimuli were exposed to the male, the male produced less than 8 notes in response. When males of this species are exposed to artificial note stimuli, males alternate the notes that they produce. Additionally, the frogs adjusted the number of notes they produced based on the increase or reduction of the artificial stimuli that was presented. This may be an indication that quacking frogs have a behavior that is meant to minimize the occurrence of call overlap.

Even though they have an array of calls, the calls are categorized as high or low pulse rates. In the C. georgiana, the first note is longer than the other notes that come in succession. However, not all males are able to match the number of notes that they are exposed to precisely, which indicates that there is a form of latency regarding call matching. The number of notes presented in a stimulus was correlated to the latency of the male's response. Human movement in the areas where these frogs inhabit during the day or evening will result in the hiding males to respond with quacks.

== Mating ==
=== Male-male interaction ===
Call matching is present within the species of the quacking frog. Call matching is said to be competitive and is presented as the producing and matching the number and complexity of call(s) between male neighbours. In cases where there are multiple calls that occur, if the time between two consecutive calls is greater than 1.5s apart then the responding male will only respond to the first stimulus and will ignore the second stimulus. Some scientists theorize that the quacking frog has a leader follower relationship due to the presence of long intervals between short advertisement calls and the fact that males usually never interrupt neighbouring male calls. Also, males have never been recorded to produce calls that were distinctively aggressive. A hypothesis that some in the field have is that call matching is a way in which calls are somewhat attractive or equivalent to the neighbouring males but with minimizing energetic cost.

In the male quacking frog, there seems to be an interaction between the size and origin of the population that contributes to variation in the sperm characteristics; this variation indicates that certain males that have specific sperm characteristics within the population use different reproductive strategies.

Quacking frogs interact with each other for territory using their arms to wrestle. They specifically fight over breeding territory, and the one with the bigger arms tends to win control over the breeding site. Additionally, the males that are larger tend to do the calling, whereas the smaller males usually act as satellites and do not call to conserve energy, resulting in a different reproductive strategy compared to the larger males of the species. Additionally, the mating success associated with arm girth was density dependent. Males with thicker arms in a low male density environment experienced increased mating, specifically amplexing, which could be attributed to wrestling silent males out of the territory and females being able to mate with males with thicker arms without being intercepted by silent males. However, when male density increases, males with larger arms must compete with more silent males, which results in increased instances of multimale amplexus. Male size and male arm girth and independent of each other, as male size influences whether a male calls or is silent, whereas the arm girth does not regulate whether a male uses the tactic of calling or being silent nor does it affect whether the male engages in singular or multimale amplexus.

Thus, male density is positively associated with multimale amplexus and sperm competition and male density is negatively associated with the advantage of arm strength for mating. This would indicate that there would be increased investment in testes mass and sperm production, which is supported by the density of males in choruses. Since a female can mate with multiple males, the sperm from different males must compete for fertilization of the ova, meaning that there is continued competition post copulation.

== Reproduction and development ==
=== Hibernation ===
Quacking frogs hibernate during summer and autumn. They use rocks and logs for cover when they are hibernating.

=== Fertilization ===
Crinia georgiana breeds mainly in the winter months, from July to October, usually near granite outcrops, in shallow murky pools. Breeding has also been known to occur in puddles and wheel ruts.

Amount of rainfall affects the timing of breeding, as this species usually breeds in temporary ponds that are only full after rain. Temperature can affect the rate of egg lying, which slows when ambient temperatures are very low. However, since water temperature is usually warmer than air temperature, it is unlikely that the water temperature will drop below 2 °C, the temperature necessary to significantly decrease breeding activity. Lunar phasing also affects mating, with higher rates occurring around the full moon. Although it is unclear why this is so, it can be inferred that the sexual activity of both males and females is synchronised by this variable.

Mating usually occurs during the night. When a female arrives at a chorus, she seeks out the calling male by moving under their body, allowing for fertilization in inguinal amplexus. However, females may be intercepted by a silent male, which are usually smaller and tend to be close to the calling male.

Fertilisation occurs via amplexus, which lasts about 23 minutes. Amplexus is a form of copulation in which the male grasps the female with his front legs while she lays her eggs and he simultaneously releases fluid containing sperm.

Matings in this species are relatively unique in that quacking frogs are polyandrous; about half of all matings involve more than one male, and possibly up to nine, resulting in a brood of offspring with multiple paternities. Polyandrous mating is more likely among smaller males, as large males can monopolize and dominate the female during amplexus. This does not appear to be beneficial, as the efficiency of the sperm does not differ significantly in terms of sperm number, size, motility, and longevity between large and small males. Furthermore, when a single male mates with a female, there is a 90–95% chance that fertilization will be successful, while there is only a 64% chance of success when three to five males mate with one female. Often this drop is due to fights that arise when other males join in an existing act of copulation, reducing the likelihood of successful sperm transfer. Therefore, there is no benefit to polyandry in terms of offspring survival to offset the high cost of reduced fertilization success and occasional female mortality. It is thus unclear why polyandry is prevalent in this species, although it could possibly be due to males wanting to increase their chances of procreation with a limited number of females.

When there is a high density of males in an area, they will fight over access to the females, with the larger males usually succeeding and gaining access to the female. Calling also decreases when densities are high, with larger males calling much more frequently than smaller males. Smaller males may refrain from calling in order to conserve energy. Energy is limited due to their size and would only be wasted by trying to compete with larger males. Females are more likely to mate with a calling male, so in order to increase the likelihood of mating success, smaller, non-calling males will often engage in "satellite" behaviour, especially at low densities. This involves associating themselves with a calling male, and when the female approaches and she and the larger male begin to mate, the smaller male will join and thus force group spawning. Group spawning also occurs at high densities when a male that has secured a calling site mates with a female and others then join in after. The larger, calling male will secure the preferred dorsal amplexus position, while inferior males are forces to take on ventral or dorsolateral positions.

=== Brood size ===
The mean number of eggs laid by female quacking frogs is 70. The number and size of eggs were dependent on the parents understanding of the environment. When the pond is not predicted to be flooded, the clutches of large eggs result in the most success, whereas variable egg sizes are produced in the clutch when the parents cannot determine the condition of the offspring's environment.

The tadpoles can adapt to specific conditions in the environment such as low water depth. The speed up in metamorphosis and larval period can result in reduced survival, decreased size, and decreased ability in jumping. Decreased size and jumping ability result in decreased fitness. Decreased jumping performance may lead to increased susceptibility to predators and decreased ability in catching prey. Additionally, decreased size influences male mating success and strategies, decreases ability to catch and consume prey, and decreased aerobic performance. For females, low water depth can increase maternal fitness as larger ova are produced however less ova are produced which can impact fitness as well.

The mating, and thus the laying of eggs, occurs in seeps that are shallow and temporary and often dry up before tadpoles metamorphose (roughly 4–7 weeks). This results in unique adaptations, such as the development of Crinia Georgiana tadpoles in eggs that are very large relative to those of other species. This allows them to mature earlier and cope with unpredictable climates. Within the species, tadpoles with larger eggs are more likely to survive to the stage of metamorphosis. Females that lay smaller eggs also lay more of them; it is logical that since smaller eggs have a decreased chance of survival, a female would produce more to increase the chances of regenerating the species. Egg size and number of eggs laid varies unpredictably from female to female, so it is unclear why some lay large eggs while others lay small ones, but more of them.

=== Tadpole survival ===
It has been determined that although tadpoles with limited foodstuff (i.e., a smaller egg) have a higher rate of mortality, those that do survive can still complete metamorphosis at the same rate as those that have plentiful food. In addition, if water levels drop, tadpoles can speed up development so as not to remain in such a fragile state while water, a critical resource, is limited. This indicates that the quacking frog has developed adaptations that allow for its survival in the dry climate of Western Australia.
