= List of amphibians of South Australia =

This is a list of amphibians of South Australia. They are all frogs.

== Order Anura (frogs and toads) ==
- Cyclorana cultripes (knife-footed frog)
- Limnodynastes dumerilii (eastern banjo frog)
- Limnodynastes fletcheri (barking marsh frog)
- Limnodynastes peronii (striped marsh frog)
- Limnodynastes tasmaniensis (spotted marsh frog)
- Neobatrachus sudellae (Sudell's frog)
- Neobatrachus pictus (painted burrowing frog)
- Neobatrachus sutor (shoemaker frog)
- Notaden nichollsi (desert spadefoot toad)

=== Family Hylidae (treefrogs) ===
- Litoria ewingi (southern brown tree frog)
- Litoria latopalmata (broad-palmed frog)
- Litoria peronii (Peron's tree frog)
- Litoria rubella (desert tree frog)
- Ranoidea caerulea (Australian green tree frog)
- Ranoidea maini (Main's frog)
- Ranoidea platycephala (water-holding frog)
- Ranoidea raniformis (growling grass frog)

=== Family Myobatrachidae (Australian ground frogs) ===
- Crinia deserticola (desert froglet)
- Crinia parinsignifera (eastern sign-bearing froglet)
- Crinia riparia (streambank froglet)
- Crinia signifera (common eastern froglet)
- Geocrinia laevis (southern smooth froglet)
- Opisthodon spenceri (Spencer's burrowing frog)
- Pseudophryne bibronii (Bibron's toadlet)
- Pseudophryne occidentalis (orange-crowned toadlet)
- Pseudophryne semimarmorata (southern toadlet)
- Uperoleia rugosa (wrinkled toadlet)

== Sources ==
- https://web.archive.org/web/20080426171922/http://www.epa.sa.gov.au/frogcensus/sa_frogs.html
- http://frogs.org.au/frogs/of/South_Australia/
