= List of amphibians of Tasmania =

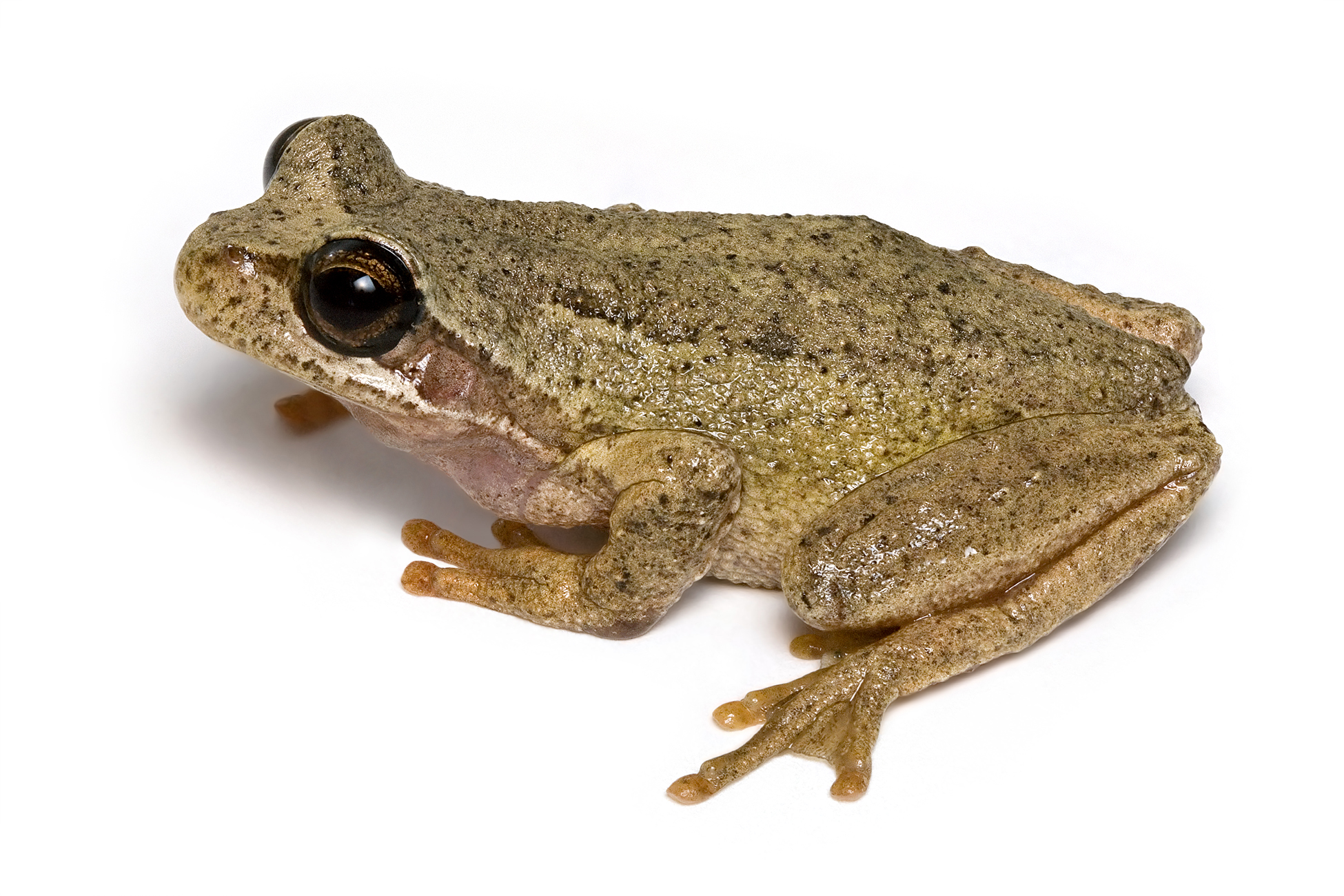
Southern brown tree frog

This is a comprehensive list of amphibians of Tasmania. They are all frogs. The frogs listed below all fall into the families Myobatrachidae, Limnodynastidae, and Hylidae, the first two of which together make up the superfamily Myobatrachoidea. After the name of each species is given its range.

== Order Anura (frogs and toads) ==
- Crinia nimbus (moss froglet) — endemic (southern Tasmania)
- Crinia signifera (common eastern froglet) — eastern Australia
- Crinia tasmaniensis (Tasmanian froglet) — endemic (most of Tasmania)
- Geocrinia laevis (smooth froglet) — southeast Australia
- Limnodynastes dumerilii (eastern banjo frog) — southeast Australia
- Limnodynastes peronii (striped marsh frog) — eastern Australia
- Limnodynastes tasmaniensis (spotted grass frog) — eastern Australia (and introduced in Western Australia)
- Litoria ewingii (southern brown tree frog) — southeast Australia
- Litoria burrowsi (Tasmanian tree frog) — endemic (western and southern Tasmania)
- Pseudophryne semimarmorata (southern toadlet) — southeast Australia
- Ranoidea raniformis (growling grass frog) — southeast Australia
