= Ecology of Tasmania =

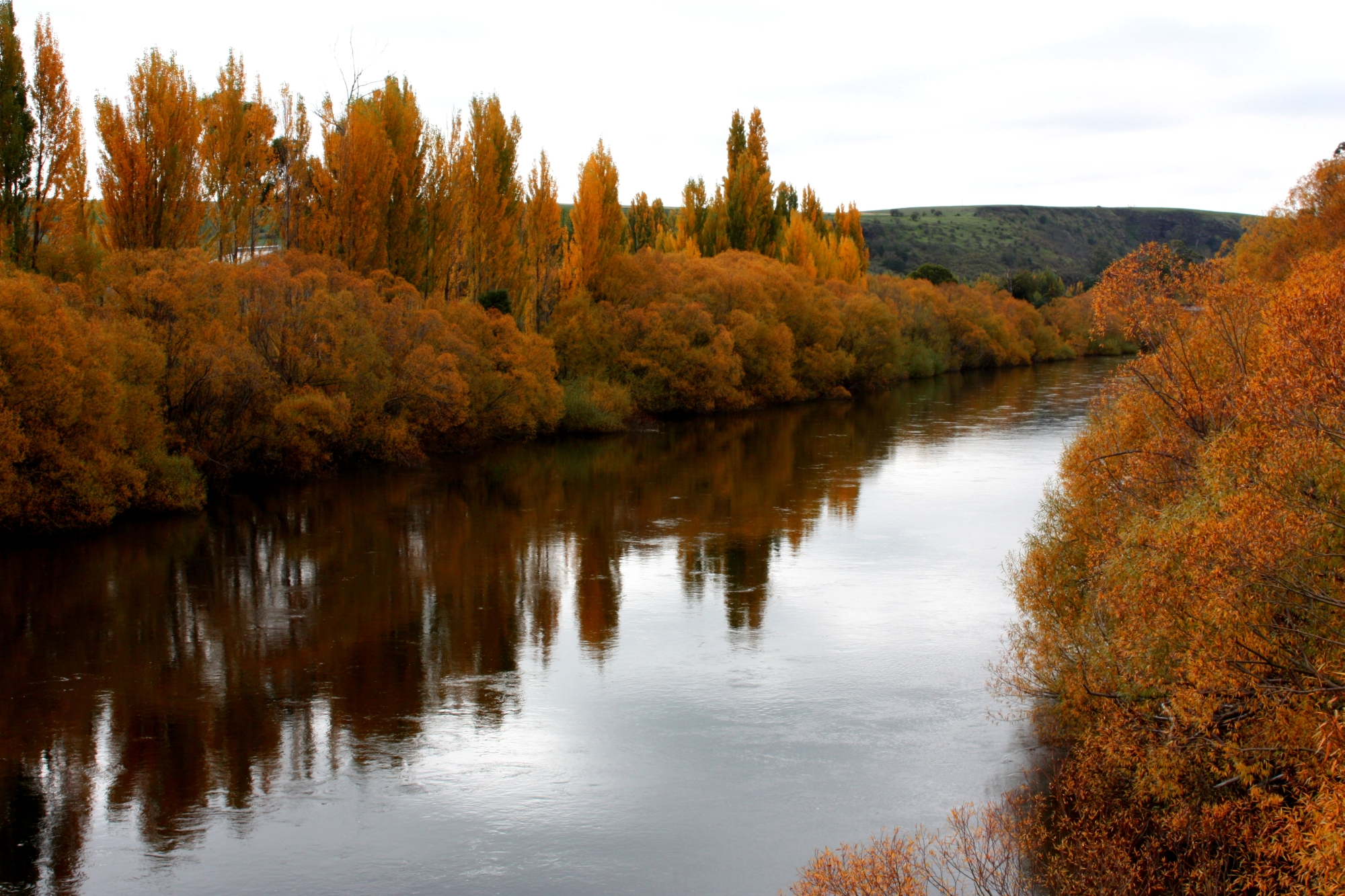
Autumn on the Derwent River in Tasmania

The biodiversity of Tasmania is of biological and paleoecological interest. A state of Australia, it is a large South Pacific archipelago of one large main island and a range of smaller islands. The terrain includes a variety of reefs, atolls, small islands, and a variety of topographical and edaphic regions on the largest island, all of which promote the development of concentrated biodiversity. During long periods geographically and genetically isolated, it is known for its unique flora and fauna. The region's climate is oceanic.

== Evolution ==
The marine fauna of the period, separate from that of the southwest Pacific, was distinguished as the "Maori province". Gondwana began its fragmentation in the middle and upper Jurassic, and the arrival of benthic invertebrate fauna is visible in fossil deposits. The Cretaceous marked the appearance of marine invertebrate fauna of southern origin. It was then that angiosperm flora such as Nothofagaceae and Proteaceae colonized New Zealand and New Caledonia, from South America, along the Antarctic margin of Gondwana: Antarctica, mainland Australia and Tasmania. At the beginning of the Tertiary the area moved to north to a warmer climate.

This led to long periods of evolution in near complete isolation. The isolation of the island was not absolute, given the rise and fall of sea level caused by the ebb and flow of ice ages. Land bridges or islands formed between Tasmania and its neighbour, mainland Australia. Thus new species came to Tasmania while Gondwanan species were able to penetrate the Pacific Islands region. Plants have limited seed dispersal mobility away from the parent plant and consequently rely upon a variety of dispersal vectors to transport their propagules, including both abiotic and biotic vectors. Seeds can be dispersed away from the parent plant individually or collectively, as well as dispersed in both space and time. Birds and bats swallow seeds, then regurgitate them or pass them in their faeces. This has been a major mechanism of seed dispersal across ocean barriers. Other seeds may stick to the feet or feathers of birds, particularly migratory or aquatic birds, and in this way travel long distances. Seeds of grasses, spores of algae, and the eggs of molluscs and other invertebrates commonly establish in remote areas after long journeys of such types.

== Flora ==
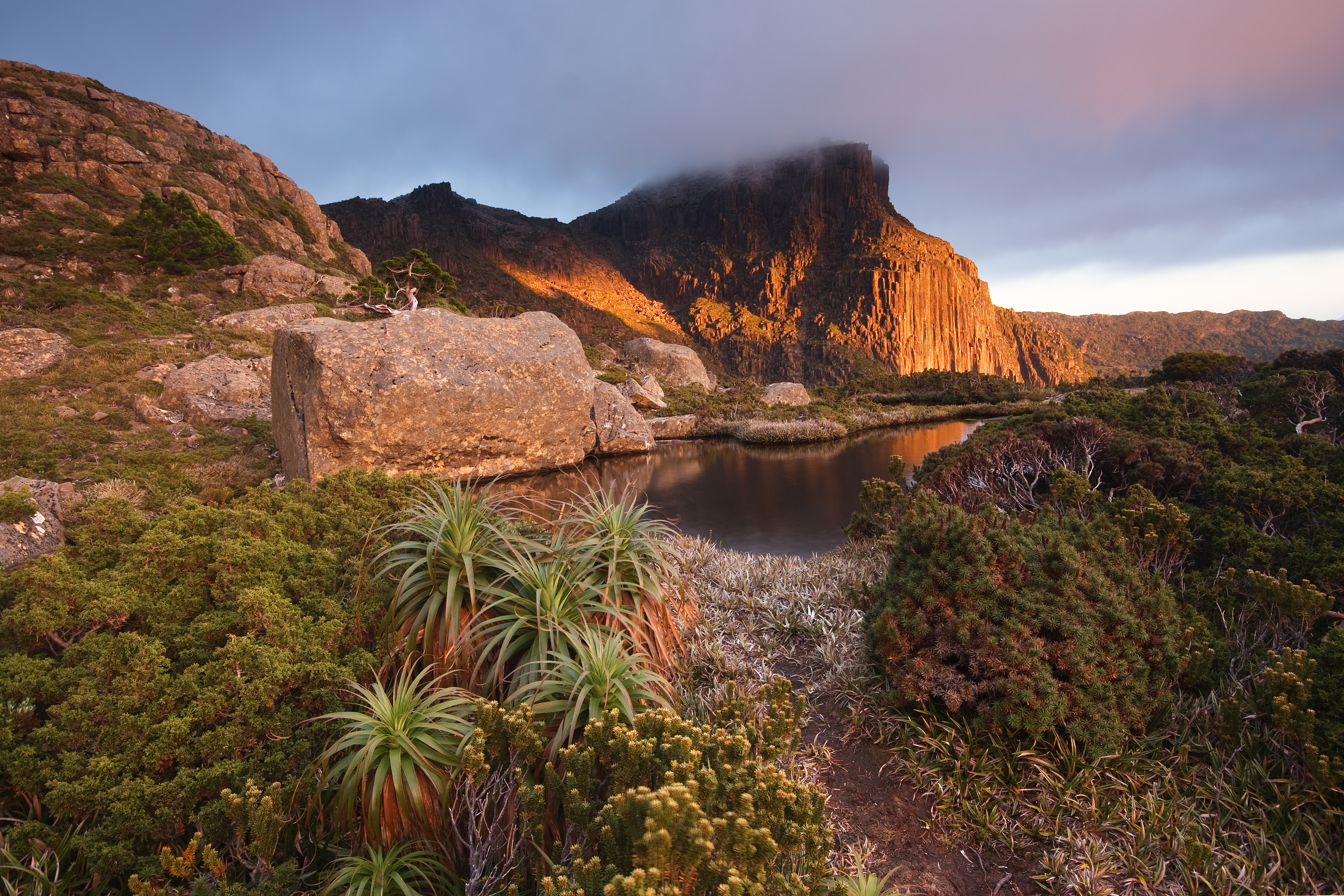
Alpine heathland at High Shelf Camp near Mount Anne, in Southwest National Park. 60% of Tasmanian alpine flora is endemic to the island.

The most ancient communities in Tasmania have an ancestry that extend back to a time when the Earth's continents were all joined as single landmass known as Pangaea which existed more than 200 million years ago. Pangaea split from east to west into Laurasia, comprising North America and Eurasia, and Gondwana, the two remaining connected at Gibraltar with the Tethys Sea separating them. The presence of closely related organisms in both the Northern and Southern Hemispheres cannot be accounted for by migration.

The Antarctic flora is a distinct community of vascular plants which evolved millions of years ago on the supercontinent of Gondwana, and is now found on several separate areas of the Southern Hemisphere, including southern South America, southernmost Africa, New Zealand, Australia and New Caledonia. Based on the similarities in their flora, botanist Ronald Good identified a separate Antarctic floristic kingdom that included southern South America, New Zealand, and some southern island groups. Good identified Australia as its own floristic kingdom, and included New Guinea and New Caledonia in the Paleotropical floristic kingdom, because of the influx of tropical Eurasian flora that had mostly supplanted the Antarctic flora.

Millions of years ago, Antarctica was warmer and much wetter, and supported the Antarctic flora, including forests of podocarps and southern beech. Antarctica was also part of the ancient supercontinent of Gondwanaland, which gradually broke up by continental drift starting 110 million years ago. The separation of South America from Antarctica 30 to 35 million years ago allowed the Antarctic Circumpolar Current to form, which isolated Antarctica climatically and caused it to become much colder. The Antarctic flora subsequently died out there, but is still an important component of the flora of southern Neotropic (South America) and Australasia, which were also former parts of Gondwana.

Some genera that originated in Antarctic flora are still a recognised major component of New Caledonia, Tasmania, mainland Australia, Madagascar, India, New Zealand, and southern South America.

There are three species of Nothofagaceae in Australia. Stands of myrtle beech (Nothofagus cunninghamii) exist in the Tarkine Forest. There are also stands of this species in the Great Otway National Park, the Central Highlands, the Strzelecki Ranges and Wilsons Promontory National Park, of Victoria.

Deciduous beech (Nothofagus gunnii) occurs in mountainous parts of Tasmania. Antarctic beech (Nothofagus moorei) is found in eastern New South Wales' cool temperate rainforests and cloud forests, but does not occur in Victoria or Tasmania.

Australia rafted north and became drier; the humid Antarctic flora retreated to the mainland east coast and Tasmania, while much of the rest of Australian vegetation became dominated by Acacia, Eucalyptus, Casuarina and xeric shrubs and grasses. Humans arrived in Australia 50 to 60,000 years ago, and used fire to reshape the vegetation of the continent.

The woody plants of the Antarctic floristic kingdom include conifers in the families Podocarpaceae, Araucariaceae and the subfamily Callitroideae of Cupressaceae, and angiosperms such as the families Proteaceae, Griseliniaceae, Cunoniaceae, Atherospermataceae, and Winteraceae, and genera like southern beech (Nothofagus) and fuchsia (Fuchsia). Many other families of flowering plants and ferns, including the tree fern Dicksonia, are characteristic of the Antarctic flora. In the past Tasmania was omitted since its plant species are more closely related to those found in the Australian floristic kingdom. Good noted, as had Joseph Dalton Hooker much earlier, that many plant species of Antarctica, temperate South America and New Zealand were very closely related, despite their disjunction by the vast Southern Ocean. Tasmania and New Caledonia share related species extinct in the Australia mainland.

Investigations of Upper Cretaceous and Early Tertiary sediments of Antarctica yield a rich assemblage of well-preserved fossil dicotyledonous angiosperm wood which provides evidence for the existence, since the Late Cretaceous, of temperate forests similar in composition to those found in present-day southern South America, New Zealand, Australia and Tasmania. It is suggested a paleobotanical habitat similar to the extant cool temperate Valdivian rainforests.

Tasmania has extremely diverse vegetation, from the heavily grazed grassland of the dry midlands to the tall evergreen eucalypt forest, alpine heathlands and large areas of cool temperate rainforests and moorlands in the rest of the state. Many flora species are unique to Tasmania, and some are related to species in South America and New Zealand through ancestors which grew on the super continent of Gondwana in the Paleotropical kingdom, 50 million years ago.

Wet eucalypt forests grow mostly in the south, west and north west, the Tasman Peninsula, and higher altitude areas of north east. Dry eucalypt forests grow where there is little rainfall and droughts are common. Areas such as the east coast, midlands and north east, i.e. the Bass Strait Islands.

Tasmania is home to some of the oldest trees of the world. For example, some individual Huon pines are more than 2,000 years old. A clonal stand of male Huon pines at Mount Read maintained itself by vegetative reproduction for what is estimated to be more than 10,000 years.

The tallest trees in the Southern Hemisphere, and the tallest flowering plants anywhere (99 metres (325 ft) tall or more), are Eucalyptus regnans, Eucalyptus globulus and Eucalyptus viminalis in Tasmania (mostly in the Styx Valley). Tasmania hosts endemic plant genera as well as plant genera of restricted distribution; an example of such a genus is Archeria.

Tasmania has an endemic Drosera (sundew) species: Drosera murfetii. Like other Drosera, these plants are known for being carnivorous and utilizing touch-sensitive trapping mechanisms to capture prey.

For millions of years these types of vegetation covered much of Earth's tropics. The species in Tasmania are relicts of a type of vegetation which once covered much of Australia, South America, Antarctica, South Africa, North America and other lands when their climates were warmer and more humid. Although humid forests of warmer climates retreated during the glaciations, they re-colonised large areas every time the climate was favourable again. Most of the humid forests are thought to have retreated and advanced during successive geological eras, and their species adapted to warm and wet gradually retreated and advanced, replaced by more cold-tolerant or drought-tolerant sclerophyll plant communities. Many of the then existing species became extinct because they could not cross the barriers posed by new oceans, mountains and deserts, but others found refuge as relict species in coastal areas and islands.

When the large landmass of the Australian continent developed a drier and harsher climate, this type of forest was reduced to those boundaries areas. Although some remnants of archaic flora still persisted in coastal mountains and sheltered sites, their biodiversity was reduced. In times of high sea level such as the present era, Tasmania as an island, has a climate moderated by the Southern and Pacific Oceans and maintained relatively high rainfall and humidity, which has allowed these communities to persist to the present day.

The ecological requirements of many of the species, are those of the laurel forest and like most of their counterpart laurifolia in the world, they are vigorous species with a great ability to populate their preferred habitats. The geographical isolation and special edaphic conditions helped to preserve it too.

Many members of the late Cretaceous - early Tertiary Gondwanan flora survived in Tasmania and New Caledonia's equable climate.

== Fauna ==
The invertebrates provide abundant evidence of Gondwanan ancestry. Possibly the best known example is the "mountain shrimp", Anaspides tasmaniae (Anaspidesidae), which is very similar to Triassic (230-million-year-old) fossils. Currently, its closest relatives are found in New Zealand and South America. The Tasmanian cave spider is considered to be one of the most primitive spiders in the world, and is the only member of its family outside Chile.

The vertebrates with strong Gondwanan affinities include the major family of freshwater fish Galaxiidae, the two families of frogs within Tasmania (Myobatrachidae and Hylidae) and the parrots. Echidnas and platypus evolved from ancient ancestors which inhabited Gondwana too. Close relatives of marsupials thrive in South America and fossil platypus have also been discovered in South America.

The repeated lowering of sea levels during the ice ages of the Pleistocene facilitated the movement of many species more, including the five species of rodent and eight species of bat.

=== Thylacine/Tasmanian tiger ===
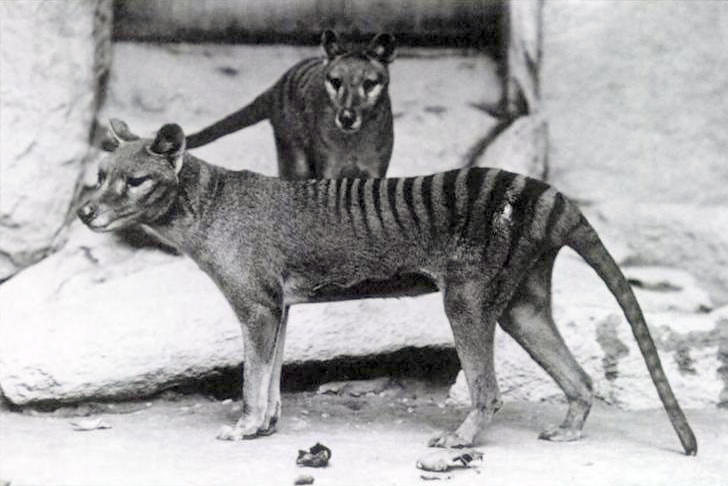
Photograph of a pair of captive thylacines (Tasmanian tigers) at the National Zoo in Washington, D.C., circa 1906.

The island of Tasmania was home to the thylacine, a marsupial which resembled a wild dog. Known colloquially as the Tasmanian tiger for the distinctive striping across its back, it became extinct in mainland Australia about 4,000 years ago because of competition with the introduced dingo. Owing to persecution by farmers, government-funded bounty hunters and, in the final years, collectors for overseas museums, it appears to have been exterminated in Tasmania.

The thylacine was the largest known carnivorous marsupial of modern times. The thylacine was one of only two marsupials to have a pouch in both sexes (the other is the water opossum). The male thylacine had a pouch that acted as a protective sheath, protecting the male's external reproductive organs while running through thick brush. The last known animal died in captivity in 1936. Many alleged sightings have since been recorded, none of them confirmed. The mature thylacine ranged from 100 to 130 cm (39 to 51 in) long, plus a tail of around 50 to 65 cm (20 to 26 in). The largest measured specimen was 290 cm (9.5 ft) from nose to tail. Adults stood about 60 cm (24 in) at the shoulder and weighed 20 to 30 kg (40 to 70 lb). There was slight sexual dimorphism with the males being larger than females on average.

=== Tasmanian devil ===
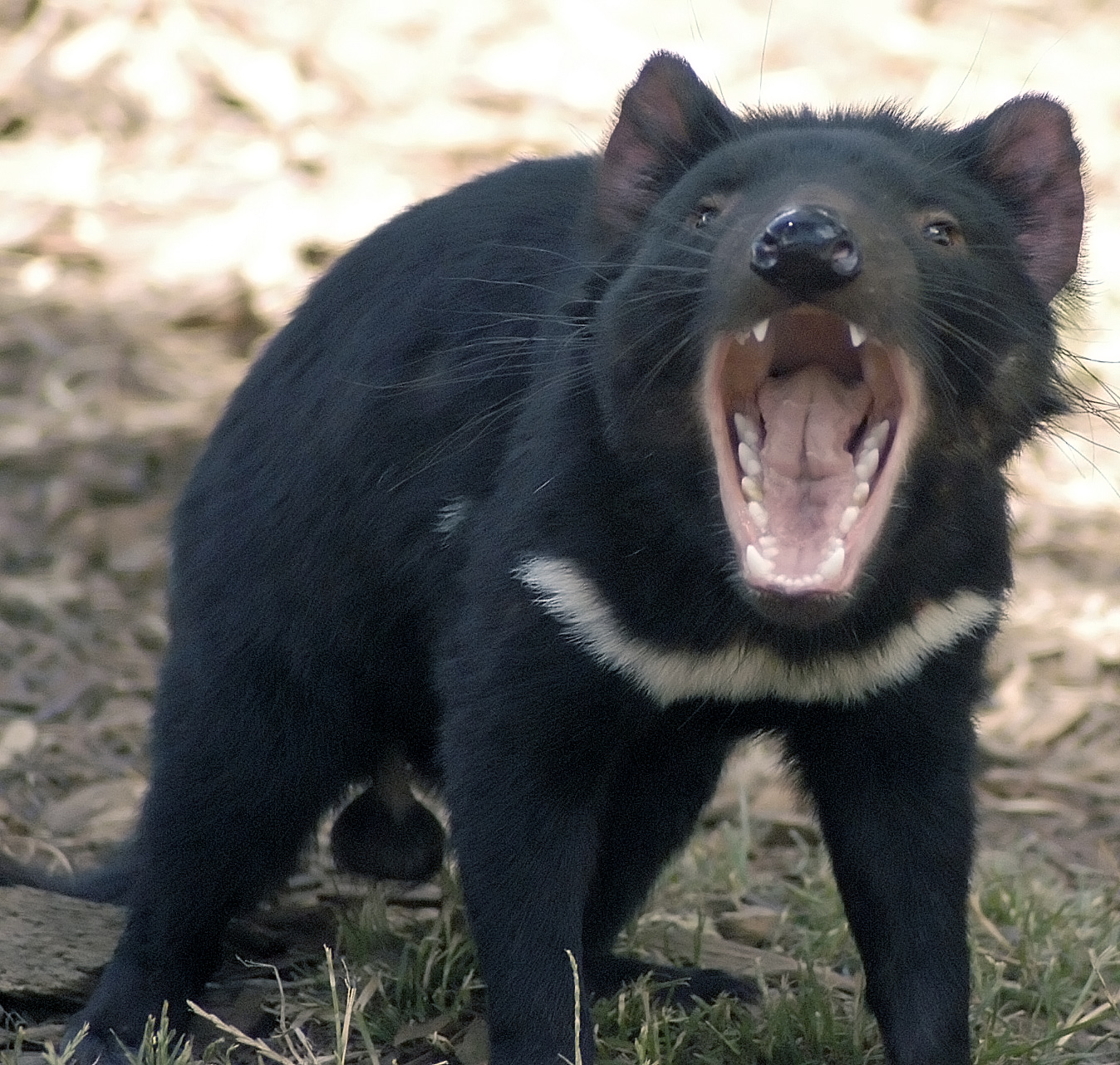
A Tasmanian devil

The Tasmanian devil is a carnivorous marsupial found on the island of Tasmania. It also occurred on mainland Australia thousands of years ago. The size of a small dog but stocky and muscular, the Tasmanian devil is characterised by black fur with white patches. It has a loud and disturbing screech-like growl, possesses a vicious temperament and is predominantly a scavenger. The Tasmanian devil survived European settlement and was considered widespread and common throughout Tasmania until recently. As with a lot of wildlife, fast vehicles on roads are a problem for Tasmanian devils, which are often killed while feeding on other road-killed animals such as wallabies. They eat everything including bone.

As of 2005, the Tasmanian devil population has been reduced by up to 80% in parts of Tasmania by the devil facial tumour disease, which is gradually spreading throughout the island. It is believed most of the effected devils starve when the tumours spread to their mouths, and that the tumours are spread by fighting over the carcasses they feed on—typically, fighting devils will bite one another's faces.

There is no known cure for the disease, and intensive research is underway to determine its cause. There is also a captive breeding program being undertaken by the Tasmanian government to establish a disease-free, genetically diverse population of Tasmanian devils outside Tasmania. This has been relatively successful so far.

=== Birds ===
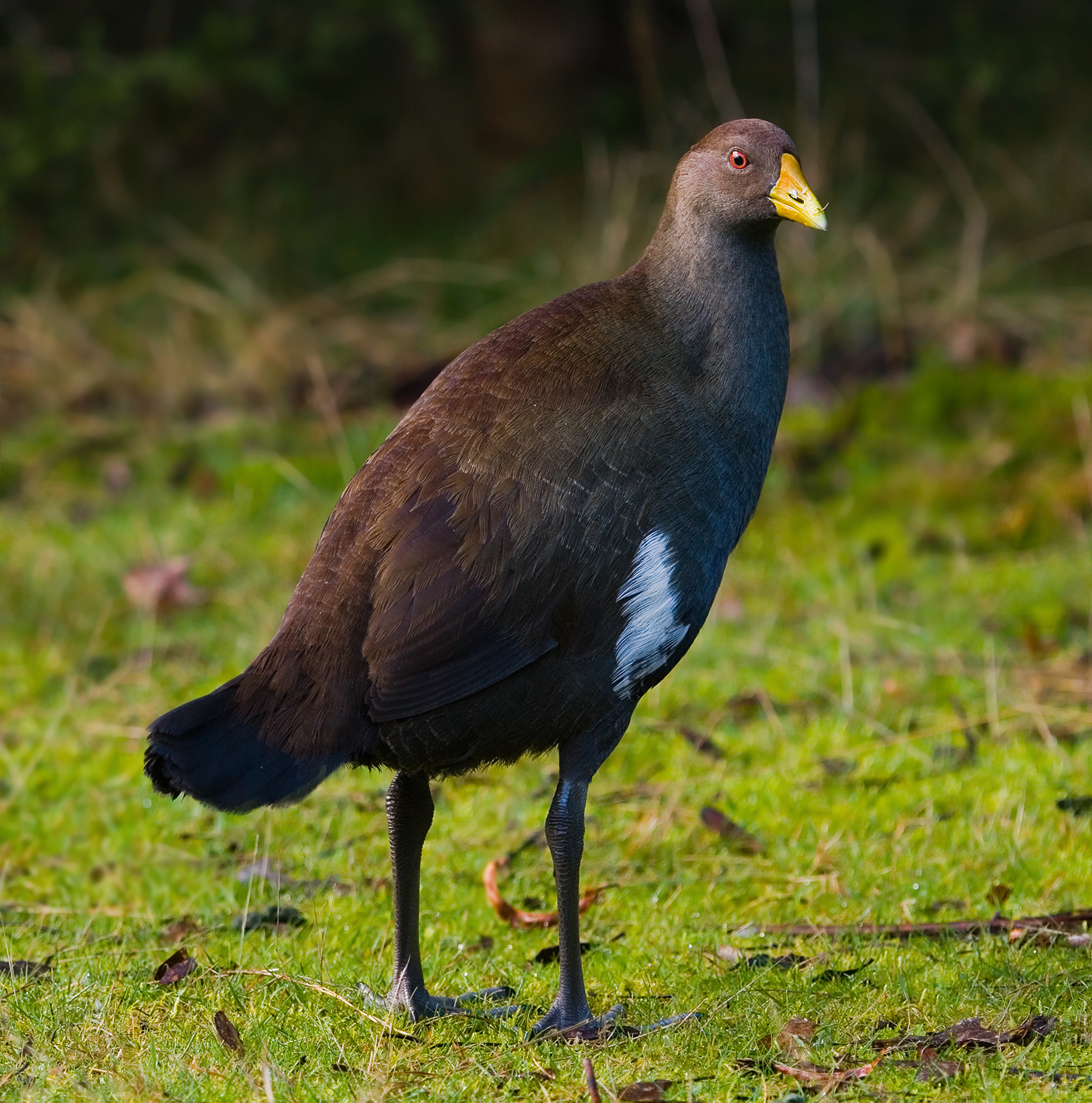
The Tasmanian nativehen

Many birds of the Australian mainland and surrounding oceans are also found in Tasmania. Tasmania has 12 endemic bird species:

- 4 honeyeaters (family Meliphagidae) – the yellow wattlebird (world's largest honeyeater) and the yellow-throated, black-headed and strong-billed honeyeaters
- 3 Australo-Papuan warblers (family Acanthizidae) – the Tasmanian thornbill, the scrubtit and the Tasmanian scrubwren
- 1 pardalote (family Pardalotidae) – the endangered forty-spotted pardalote
- 1 Australo-Papuan robin (family Petroicidae) – the dusky robin
- 1 cracticine (family Artamidae) – the black currawong
- 1 parrot (family Psittaculidae) – the green rosella
- 1 rail (family Rallidae) – the Tasmanian nativehen, Australia's only flightless land bird other than the giant ratites (emu and southern cassowary).

The endemic Tasmanian emu was exterminated in the mid-19th century. The Tasmanian wedge-tailed eagle is a threatened endemic subspecies.

=== Frogs ===
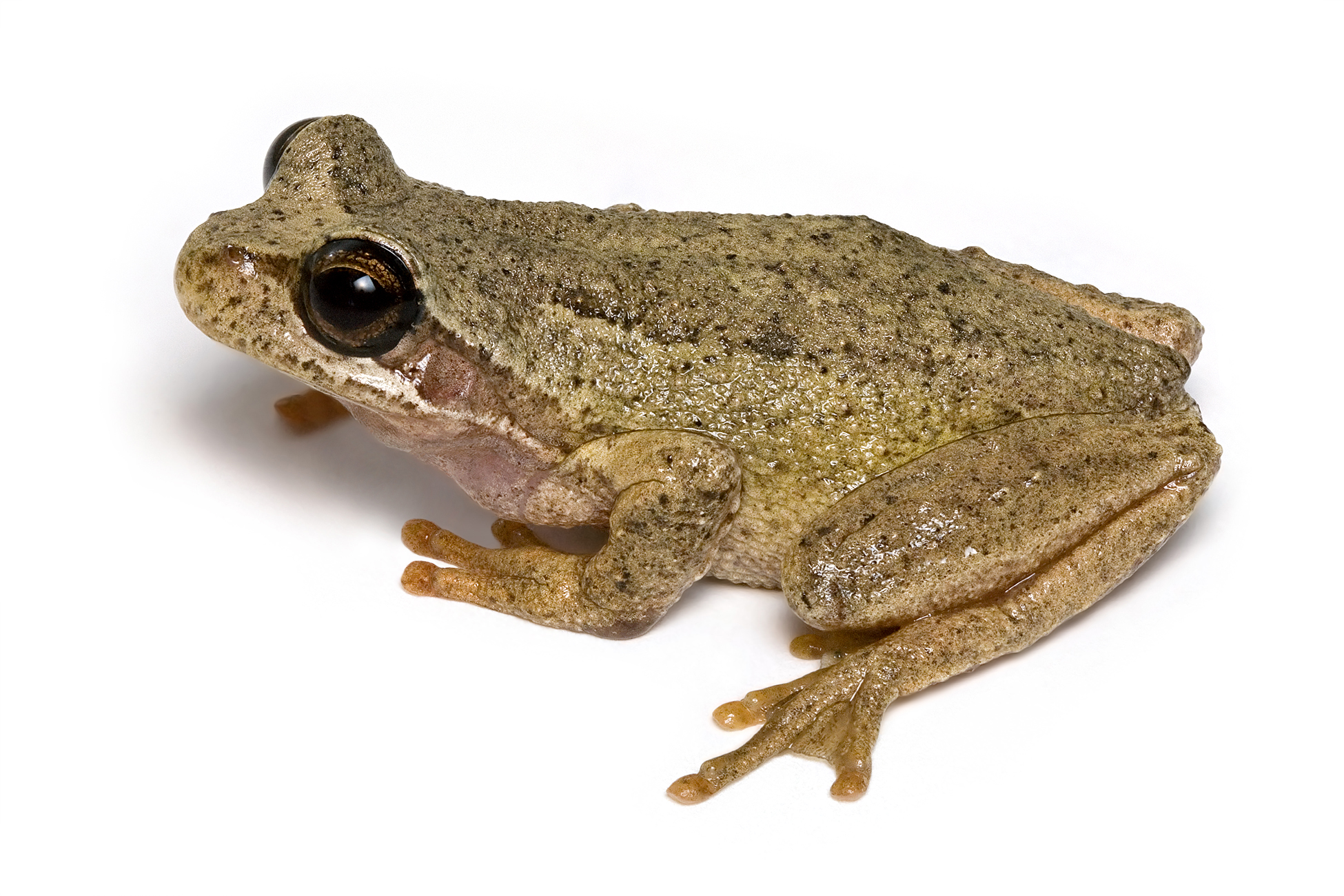
The brown tree frog is found in Tasmania

Tasmania is home to 11 species of frog. Three of these are found only in Tasmania, the Tasmanian tree frog (Litoria burrowsae), the Tasmanian froglet (Crinia tasmaniensis) and the moss froglet (Bryobatrachus nimbus) described in 1994. Of the 11 species that inhabit Tasmania all are endemic to Australia. Tasmania is home to the largest breeding population of growling grass frogs (Litoria raniformis), a vulnerable species, which has declined over much of its range.

=== European red fox ===
On 20 June 2001, Tasmania formed a fox task force, now the Fox Eradication Branch, to eliminate the European red fox. Officials planned to spend up to A$50 million on an eradication campaign, which has since been reduced. No foxes have been captured, poisoned or photographed with certainty in the island state, although four carcasses have been recovered. Of these, one was claimed to be shot, and the other three presumed road-kills. The lack of an abundance of foxes, through low population densities, and fox-poisoning campaigns, has resulted in an abundance of denial of fox presence in Tasmania. Established foxes in Tasmania could devastate native mammals, livestock, ground-nesting birds and native rodents. Experts estimate there are fewer than 30 million foxes on mainland Australia, having been introduced by European settlers.

Since settlement, about 28 native mammal species or subspecies have become extinct from the Australian mainland, the worst rate of continental extinction in the world. Red foxes are known to be a significant contributing factor to this. Mainland extinctions or near-extinctions include the eastern barred bandicoot, eastern quoll, and Tasmanian pademelon (Thylogale billardierii); all still common in Tasmania. A member of the upper house, the Legislative Council member for Windermere Ivan Dean has been publicly critical of the evidence used to obtain funding for a taxpayer funded Fox Eradication Branch of the Tasmanian D.P.I.P.W.E. Former Tasmanian Police Commander Dean led an investigation into the alleged importation and release of foxes into Tasmania. The investigation did not uncover any evidence of illegal importation. He then raised the Tasmanian fox issue in the Tasmanian Parliament on 17 April 2007.

In addition to the four carcasses, over 40 independently tested fox-DNA-confirmed scats have been located across Tasmania. Through government review, foxes are now confirmed to be in Tasmania. Certain prominent Tasmanians including Dr David Obendorf have been calling for a Federal Police investigation into allegations that evidence has been planted and this is all part of an elaborate hoax to receive funding from the Commonwealth.

== See also ==
- Alpine vegetation of Tasmania
- Flora of Australia
- Fauna of Australia
