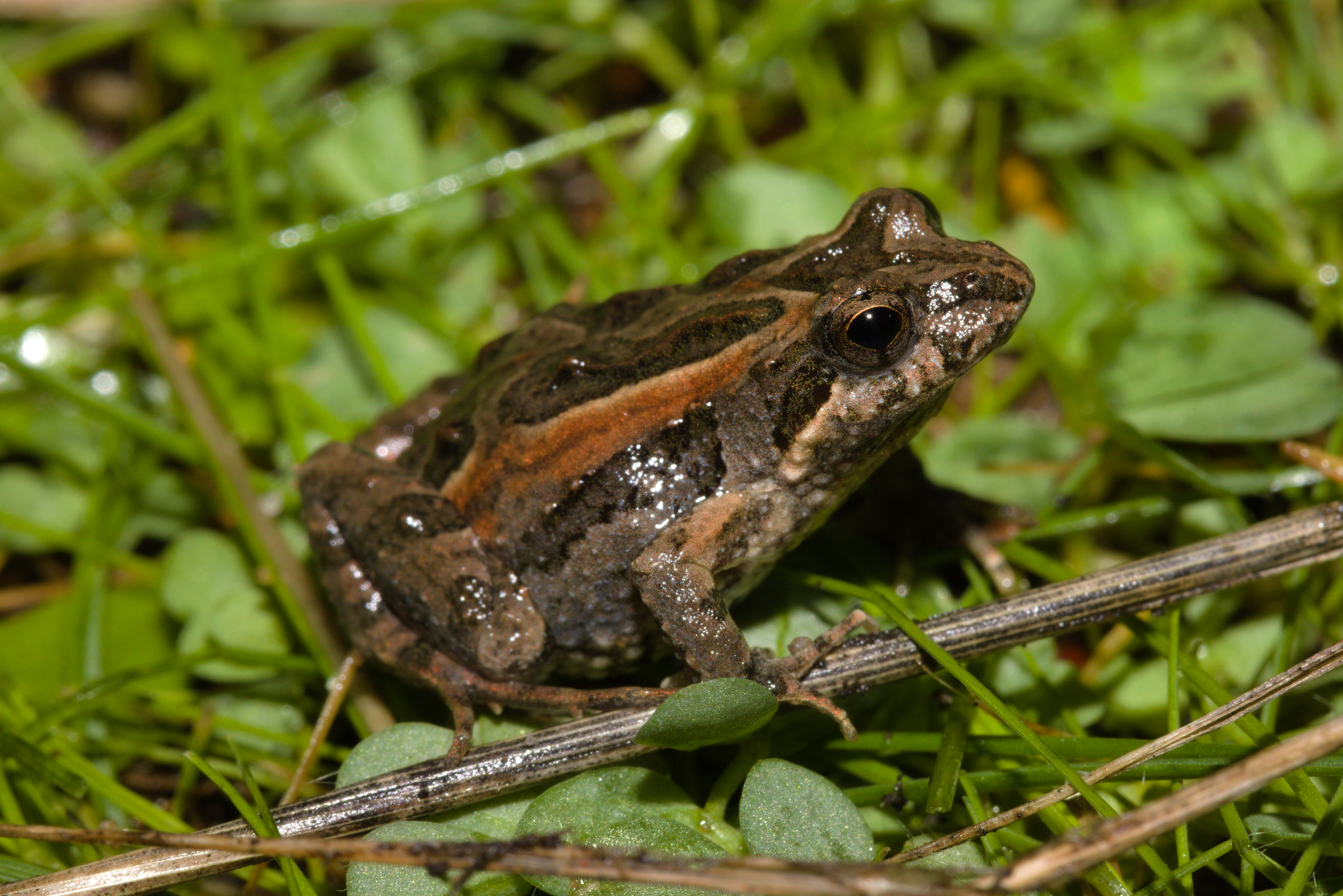

Conservation status
- Least Concern (IUCN 3.1)

Scientific classification
- Kingdom: Animalia
- Phylum: Chordata
- Class: Amphibia
- Order: Anura
- Family: Myobatrachidae
- Genus: Crinia
- Species: C. insignifera

Binomial name
- Crinia insignifera Moore, 1954

= Squelching froglet =

Species of amphibian

The squelching froglet (Crinia insignifera), sometimes called the sign-bearing froglet, is a frog in the family Myobatrachidae. It is endemic to south-western Australia.

== Taxonomy and naming ==
Crinia signifera was first described in 1954 by John Alexander Moore, a Fulbright Research Scholar from Columbia University who was working at Sydney University in New South Wales. Prior to this, C. insignifera was part of the C. signifera species. Breeding experiments conducted by Moore showed that the Western Australian and New South Wales populations did not produce many viable tadpoles, suggesting that the two regions actually represented different species.

The 1954 publication that describes the species states that the Western Australian type specimen was collected in September 1952 in Armadale; however, the tag on the holotype at the Australian Museum apparently states that it was collected in Attadale in August 1952, and this latter location is typically specified in relevant literature. The specific epithet insignifera references the eastern C. signifera from which the species was split, as well the morphological similarity that Moore noted between the two species.

== Description ==
As with many other small (< 3 cm) Crinia species across Australia, squelching froglets show considerable variation in dorsal and ventral colouration and patterns. Colouration on dorsal surfaces is typically medium grey and/or brown, but can have tones or patches of light grey to fawn, red, gold, dark grey, dark brown. Patterns can vary from uniform colouration to blotched, marbled and striped. Skin can vary from smooth to rough, with or without raised longitudinal folds.

Ventral patterns can show dimorphism between the sexes. Calling males typically have strong black coloration on the chin around the edge of the jawline, with a white or pale throat, although some individuals can have dark throats as well. Males tend to have plain white or pale bellies. Females typically have a white chin, throat and belly.

It is not always possible to separate squelching froglets, rattling froglets (C. glauerti), South Coast froglets (C. subinsignifera), and bleating froglets (C. pseudinsignifera) from one another, particularly if just a photo of the dorsal surface is available. The ventral surface patterns may help guide identification, however as these are also highly variable care must be taken. The geographic distribution of the species may also help to identify an individual, however there is overlap between various species in many locations, making mis-identification easy.

== Distribution and habitat ==
Squelching froglets are found in southwestern Australia, limited to the Swan Coastal Plain to the west of the Darling Range between Gingin in the north and Busselton in the south. They are also found on Rottnest Island, off the coast of Perth.

Squelching froglets occupy coastal plains, often occurring near natural swamps, creeks and pools, but also pastureland, plantations, rural gardens, water storage areas, ponds, open excavations, and sewage treatment areas.

== Behaviour and ecology ==
Like other Crinia species, squelching froglets probably feed on a variety of small insects and arachnids, including mosquitoes, caterpillars, flies, and small spiders.

Squelching froglets typically breed in creeks, swamps or pools, including flooded or seasonally inundated grasslands or shrubby areas beside streams, gutters and seeps. They are often present in areas that are only ephemerally wet in Winter.

Eggs are laid singly, usually on the substrate in shallow water.

Tadpoles take about five months to develop into frogs, and feed mostly on sediments and algae.

== Conservation status ==
The squelching froglet was assessed by the IUCN SSC Amphibian Specialist Group in 2022 and listed as Least Concern. It is typically considered common and widespread, with no known specific threats. Chytrid fungus was detected in this species, but no declines have been reported, and it is not considered a threat to the species. Squelching froglets are common within the Perth metropolitan area, including many urban drainage lines and seemingly isolated wetlands.
