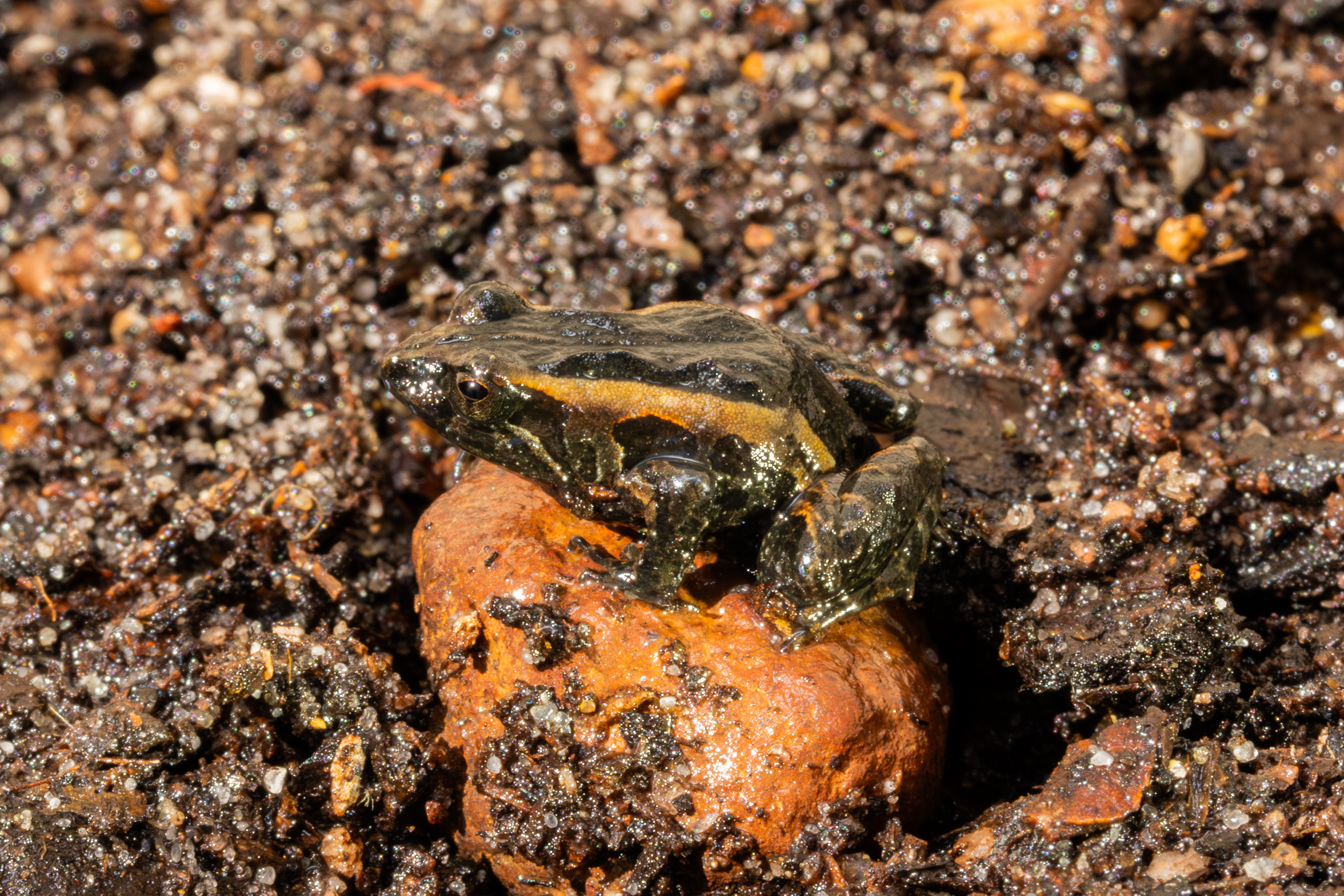

Conservation status
- Least Concern (IUCN 3.1)

Scientific classification
- Kingdom: Animalia
- Phylum: Chordata
- Class: Amphibia
- Order: Anura
- Family: Myobatrachidae
- Genus: Crinia
- Species: C. glauerti

Binomial name
- Crinia glauerti Loveridge, 1933

= Rattling froglet =

Species of frog

The rattling froglet (Crinia glauerti), also called the clicking froglet or Glauert's froglet, is a frog in the Myobatrachidae family that is endemic to Australia.

== Taxonomy and naming ==
The rattling froglet was first described by Arthur Loveridge, a curator of the Museum of Comparative Zoology at Harvard University. The species was described from a holotype female collected by Dr Philip Jackson Darlington Jr. at the Mundaring Weir near Perth in southwestern Australia, as part of the Harvard Australian Expedition (1931–1932). Loveridge named the species after Ludwig Glauert, a herpetologist and curator at the Western Australian Museum.

== Description ==
As with many other small (< 3 cm) Crinia species across Australia, rattling froglets show considerable variation in dorsal and ventral colouration and patterns. Colouration on dorsal surfaces can be sandy gold, light grey to fawn, brown, bright russet, dark grey, dark brown, or almost black, with patterns that vary from uniform colouration to blotched, marbled and striped. Skin can vary from smooth to rough, with or without raised longitudinal folds.

Ventral patterns are dimorphic between the sexes. Males typically have varying levels of black on the chin, throat, belly, and legs, although they can also be very plain or have white and black blotching on the belly. Females typically have a white chin, throat and belly, with varying degrees of black blotching. Both sexes can have a mid-ventral stripe or cross.

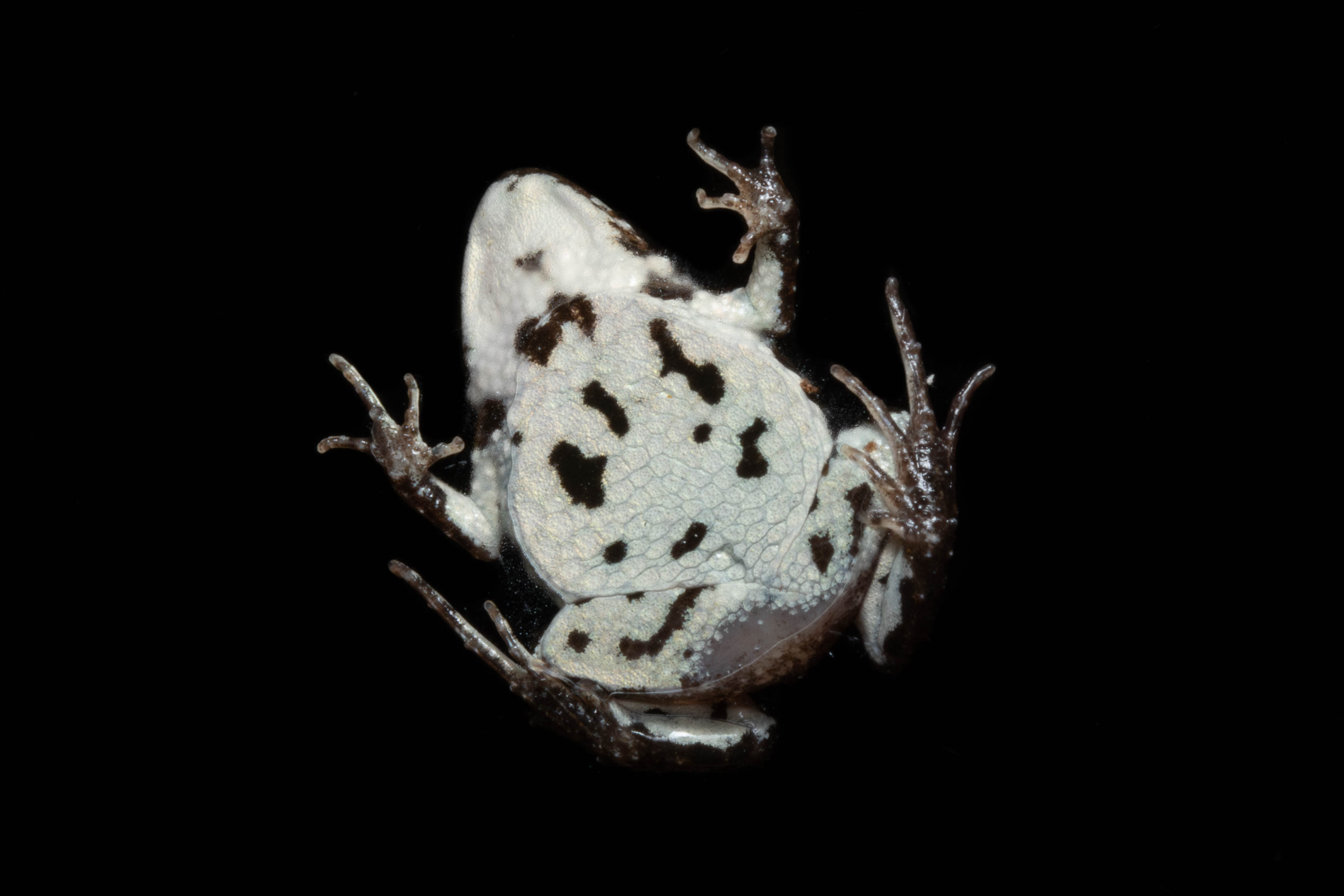
Female rattling froglet from Perth, Western Australia

It is not always possible to separate rattling froglets, squelching froglets (C. insignifera), South Coast froglets (C. subinsignifera), and bleating froglets (C. pseudinsignifera) from one another, particularly if just a photo of the dorsal surface is available. The ventral surface patterns may help guide identification, however as these are also highly variable care must be taken. The geographic distribution of the species may also help to identify an individual, however there is overlap between various species in many locations, making mis-identification easy.

== Distribution and habitat ==
Rattling froglets are found in southwestern Australia, along the coast and adjacent areas. The species is patchily distributed from the Moore River area, north of Perth, to the Albany region and Stirling Ranges in the south-east.

Rattling froglets occupy coastal plains, inland ranges, and riverine areas, often occurring near natural swamps, creeks and pools in forests, but also pastureland, plantations, rural gardens, water storage areas, ponds, open excavations, and sewage treatment areas.

== Behaviour and ecology ==
Like other Crinia species, rattling froglets probably feed on a variety of small insects and arachnids, including mosquitoes, caterpillars, flies, and small spiders.

Rattling froglets typically breed in creeks, swamps or pools, including flooded or seasonally inundated grasslands or shrubby areas beside streams, gutters and seeps. They are usually present in areas that remain wet throughout most of the year. Frogs in amplexus are frequently observed on top of floating vegetation (e.g. duckweed) in shallow (< 50 cm) water. Eggs are laid singly, usually attached in small groups or rows along stems of submerged vegetation or leaves, or on the substrate in shallow water.

Tadpoles take about four months to develop into frogs, and feed mostly on sediments and algae.

== Conservation status ==
The rattling froglet was assessed by the IUCN SSC Amphibian Specialist Group in 2022 and listed as Least Concern. It is typically considered common and widespread, with no known specific threats. Chytrid fungus was detected in this species, but no declines have been reported, and it is not considered a threat to the species. Rattling froglets are common within the Perth metropolitan area, including many urban drainage lines and seemingly isolated wetlands.
