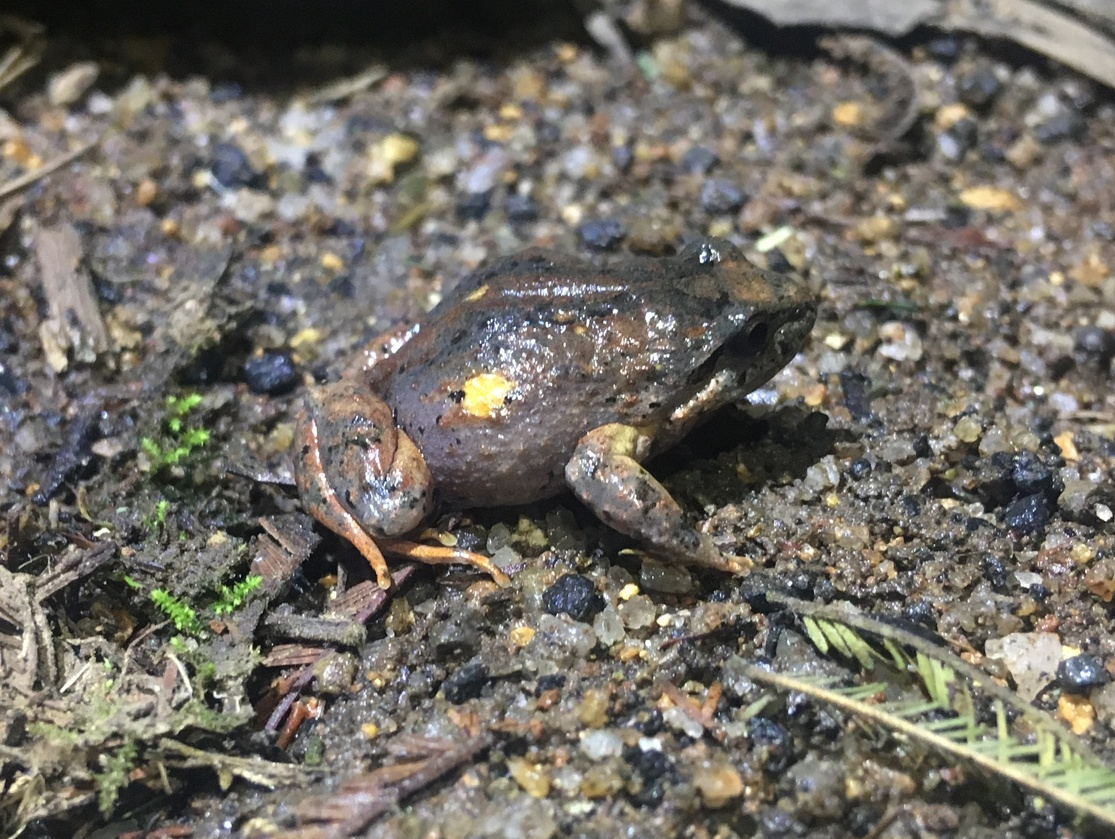

Conservation status
- Least Concern (IUCN 3.1)

Scientific classification
- Kingdom: Animalia
- Phylum: Chordata
- Class: Amphibia
- Order: Anura
- Family: Myobatrachidae
- Genus: Geocrinia
- Species: G. victoriana

Binomial name
- Geocrinia victoriana (Boulenger, 1888)

Synonyms
- Crinia victoriana Boulenger, 1888; Crinia froggatti Fletcher, 1891

= Eastern smooth frog =

Species of amphibian

The eastern smooth frog (Geocrinia victoriana), or Victoria ground froglet, is a species of frog in the family Myobatrachidae.

It is endemic to Australia, specifically to the states of Victoria and New South Wales, where its natural habitats are widely variable, including both wet and dry forests, grasslands, and alpine bogs.
