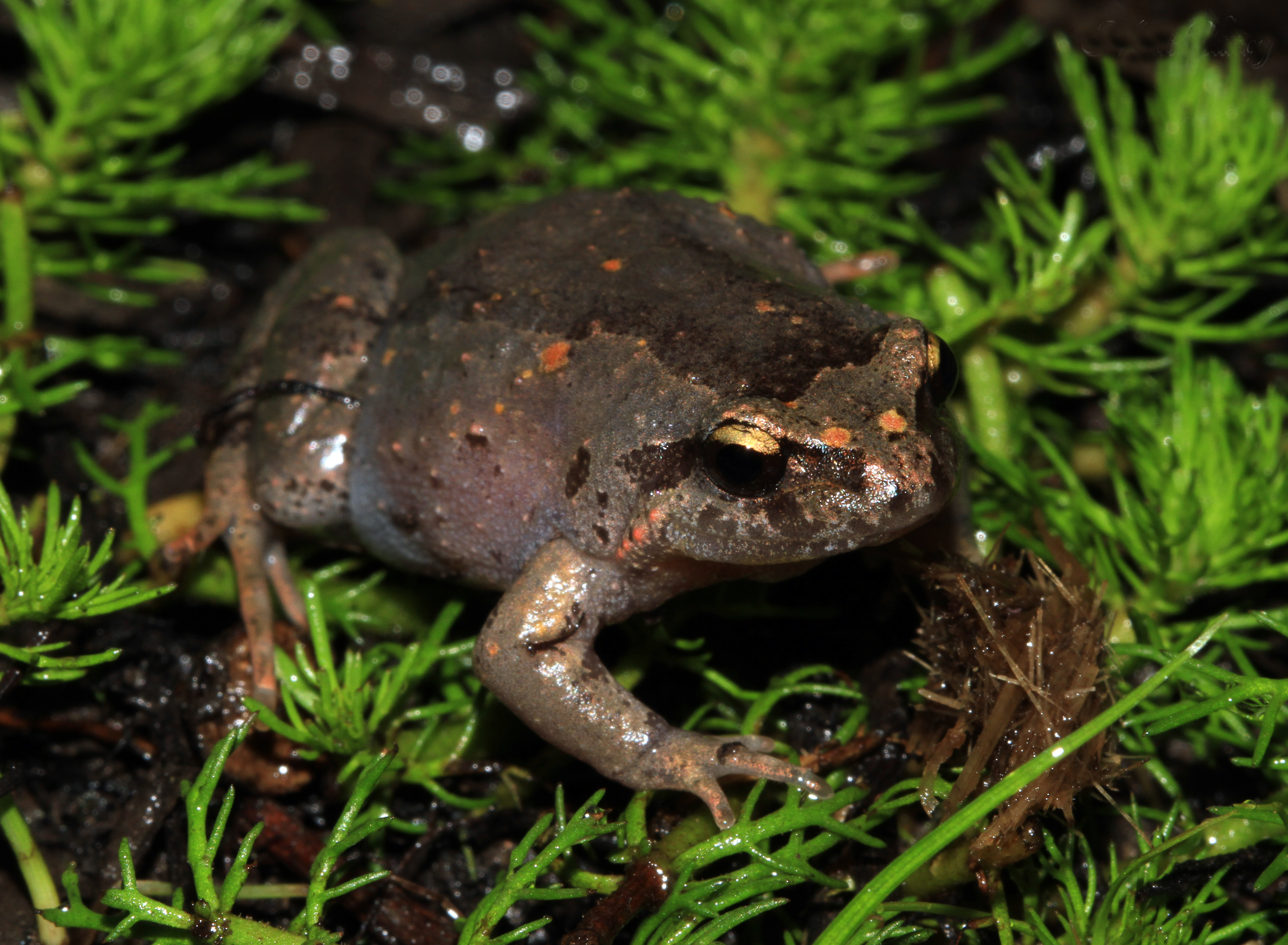
- Geocrinia laevis

Scientific classification
- Domain: Eukaryota
- Kingdom: Animalia
- Phylum: Chordata
- Class: Amphibia
- Order: Anura
- Family: Myobatrachidae
- Subfamily: Myobatrachinae
- Genus: Geocrinia; Blake, 1973

Species
- See text
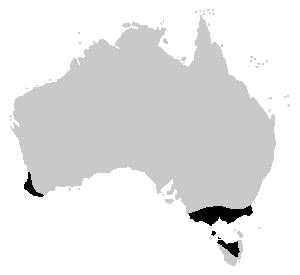
- Distribution of Geocrinia

= Geocrinia =

Genus of amphibians

Geocrinia is a genus of frogs in the family Myobatrachidae. These frogs are endemic to Australia. Two species are known from southeastern Australia (Victoria and Tasmania), while one is known from southeastern Western Australia.

All the species in this genus were at some point referred to as Crinia. Further studies showed there was some considerable differences between this group of frogs and Crinia. These differences included; a slightly sturdier body, smoother skin on the ventral surface and the greatest difference, the reproductive nature, laying the eggs outside of water.

Until 2022, four other species in Western Australia were also classified in this genus, but a phylogenetic study reclassified them into the new genus Anstisia. Species of Geocrinia develop initially in the egg then hatch when sufficient rain falls for them to complete their larval development in water, while Anstisia go through the tadpole stage entirely on land in the egg capsule.

== Species ==
Common name	Binomial name
Smooth frog	Geocrinia laevis (Günther, 1864)
Lea's frog	Geocrinia leai (J. J. Fletcher, 1898)
Otway smooth frog	Geocrinia sparsiflora Parkin et al., 2023
Eastern smooth frog	Geocrinia victoriana (Boulenger, 1888)
