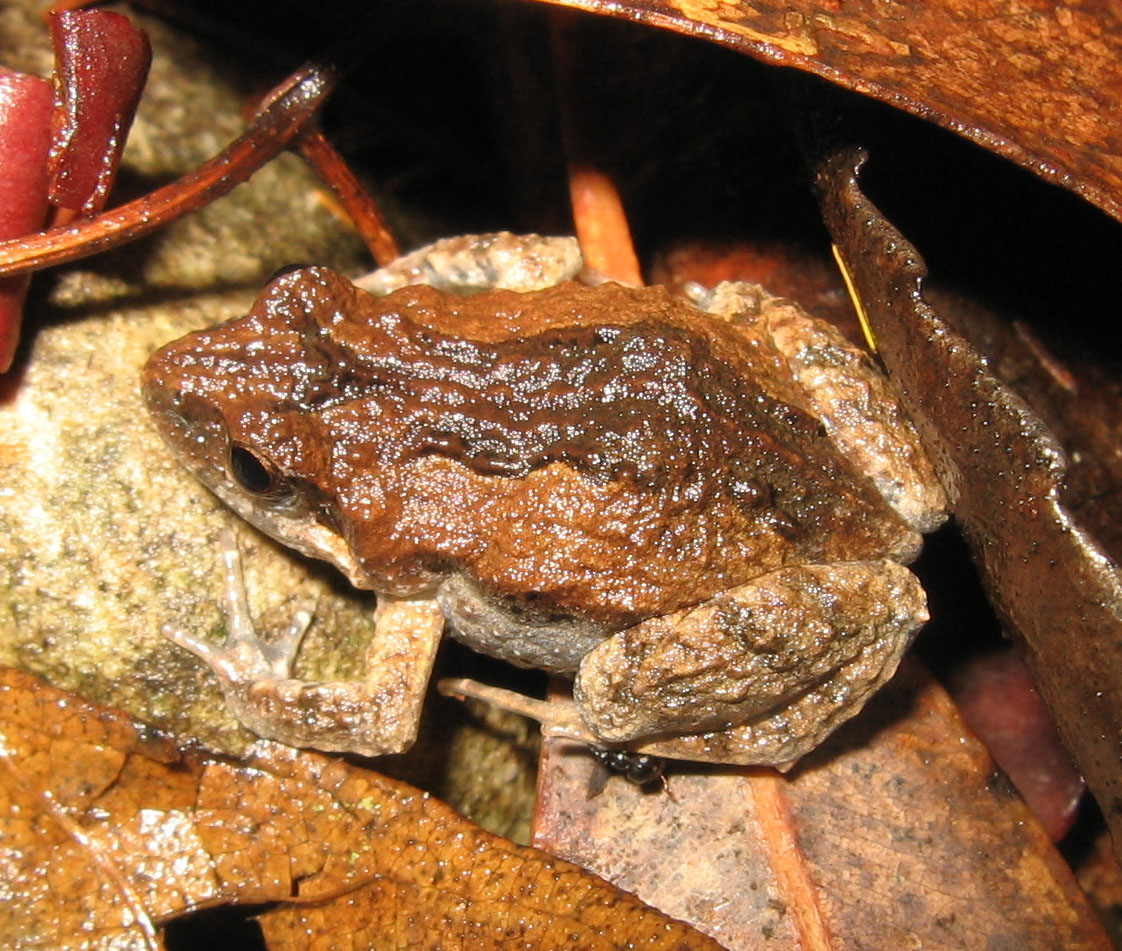
- Common eastern froglet (Crinia signifera)

Scientific classification
- Kingdom: Animalia
- Phylum: Chordata
- Class: Amphibia
- Order: Anura
- Family: Myobatrachidae
- Subfamily: Myobatrachinae
- Genus: Crinia; Tschudi, 1838

Species
- See text

= Crinia =

Genus of amphibians

Crinia is a genus of frog, native to Australia, and part of the family Myobatrachidae. It consists of small frogs, which are distributed throughout most of Australia, excluding the central arid regions. Many of the species within this genus are physically indistinguishable, and can only be identified by their calls.

== Taxonomy ==
The generic name Crinia likely derives from the Greek verb κρῑνω (krīnō) "to separate" as a reference to the frog's unwebbed digits, meaning "separated (toes)". Although Johann Jakob von Tschudi did not provide an etymology in 1838, he cited the frog's "free toes" (without webbing) as an important distinctive feature (most frogs have webbed feet).

During the 1950s, 1960s and 1970s a lot of taxonomic work was done on this genus, frogs that were originally thought to be common eastern froglets (Crinia signifera) were described as other species of Crinia by mating call analysis and hybridization experiments. Two species originally described as Crinia were then placed in their own genus, Assa and Paracrinia. One species of both Geocrinia and Taudactylus were split from Crinia and the genus Bryobatrachus was also described only to be recently placed back into Crinia. The moss froglet, (Crinia nimbus) is very different physically and in its tadpole development. Due to the obvious differences with other species in Crinia this species is likely to be placed again into a separate genus.

== Morphology ==
They have unwebbed toes and fingers.

Crinia species are typically small frogs, hence the use of the name "froglets" for many species. The species within Crinia are generally similar in dorsal and ventral appearance, with high levels of variation within and among populations within a species, but not a large amount of diagnostic morphological variation among species. This can make identification to species level difficult based on morphological features or photographs. The geographic distribution of the species may also help to identify an individual, however there is overlap between various species in many locations, making mis-identification easy.

Typically Crinia species exhibit dorsal colour pattern types that include plain, striped, marbled and lyrate "morphs", and have skin textures that can be described as smooth, granular, and/or ridged. Most of the species in this genus are polymorphic, meaning that several variations of colour and skin patterning and texture exist in a single population.

The presence of hybrid individuals between some Crinia species can make identification even more difficult.

== Ecology and behaviour ==
Crinia females typically lay eggs singly on vegetation, such as grass blades, in water, rather than as foamy clumps of eggs.

Tadpoles feed primarily on sediment and algae or biofilm.

== Species ==
The genus Crinia contains 17 species:

| Common name | Binomial name |
|---|---|
| Bilingual frog | Crinia bilingua (Martin, Tyler, and Davies, 1980) |
| Desert froglet | Crinia deserticola (Liem and Ingram, 1977) |
| Kimberley froglet | Crinia fimbriata Doughty, Anstis, and Price, 2009 |
| Northern Flinders Ranges froglet | Crinia flindersensis Donnellan, Anstis, Price, and Wheaton, 2012 |
| Quacking frog | Crinia georgiana (Tschudi, 1838) |
| Glauert's froglet | Crinia glauerti (Loveridge, 1933) |
| Sign-bearing froglet | Crinia insignifera (Moore, 1954) |
| Moss froglet | Crinia nimbus (Rounsevell, Ziegeler, Brown, Davies, and Littlejohn, 1994) |
| Eastern sign-bearing froglet | Crinia parinsignifera (Main, 1957) |
| False western froglet | Crinia pseudinsignifera (Main, 1957) |
| Remote froglet | Crinia remota (Tyler and Parker, 1974) |
| Streambank froglet | Crinia riparia (Littlejohn and Martin, 1965) |
| Common eastern froglet | Crinia signifera (Girard, 1853) |
| Sloane's froglet | Crinia sloanei (Littlejohn, 1958) |
| Small western froglet | Crinia subinsignifera (Littlejohn, 1957) |
| Tasmanian froglet | Crinia tasmaniensis (Günther, 1864) |
| Wallum froglet | Crinia tinnula (Straughan and Main, 1966) |
