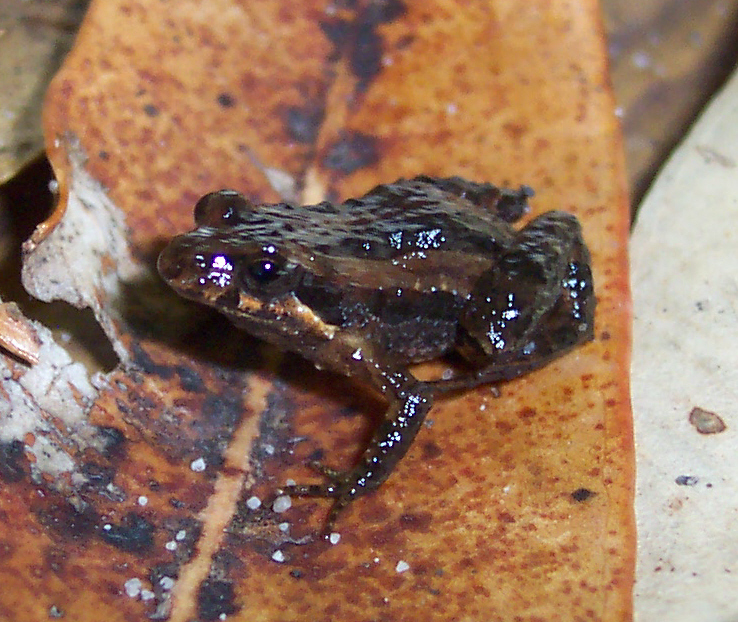

Conservation status
- Vulnerable (IUCN 3.1)

Scientific classification
- Domain: Eukaryota
- Kingdom: Animalia
- Phylum: Chordata
- Class: Amphibia
- Order: Anura
- Family: Myobatrachidae
- Genus: Crinia
- Species: C. tinnula

Binomial name
- Crinia tinnula Straughan and Main, 1966
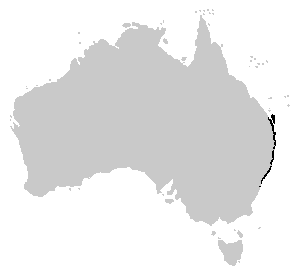
- Wallum froglet range.

= Wallum froglet =

Species of amphibian

The wallum froglet (Crinia tinnula) or tinkling froglet is a species of ground-dwelling frog native to the east coast of Australia, from southeast Queensland to Kurnell, NSW. It is strongly associated with Wallum swampland.

== Description ==
This species is a small species of frog, up to 15 mm in length. It is very similar to the common eastern froglet, and can only readily be distinguished by call and a white stripe on the throat that reaches all the way to the tip on the snout. Its dorsal surface is variable, it can range from grey to brown and is normally smooth in texture. The dorsal surface can be spotted, plain, however it is normally striped. The ventral surface is faintly marbled black and white.

== Ecology and behaviour ==
This species is confined to acid paperbark swamps in wallum country. Males make a high pitched squeaking noise and call at any time of the year, when water is available. Males normally call from hidden positions in grass, while floating in the water. Breeding happens mostly during autumn and winter and occurs in large swamps and temporary ponds fringing the swamp. Eggs are laid singly on twigs and leaves in still water. Tadpoles are brown with arched tail fins, reaching almost 40 mm in size. Tadpole development takes nearly 6 months, with metamorph frogs ranging from 6–11 mm.

The swamps that these frogs inhabit are coming under increasing threat by urbanisation.

== Sources ==
- Anstis, M. 2002. Tadpoles of South-eastern Australia. Reed New Holland: Sydney.
- Robinson, M. 2002. A Field Guide to Frogs of Australia. Australian Museum/Reed New Holland: Sydney.
- Frog Australia Network-frog call available here.
