= Northern Flinders Ranges froglet =

Scientific classification
- Kingdom: Animalia
- Phylum: Chordata
- Class: Amphibia
- Order: Anura
- Family: Myobatrachidae
- Genus: Crinia
- Species: C. flindersensis

Binomial name
- Crinia flindersensis Donnellan, Anstis, Price & Wheaton, 2012
- Approximate distribution (Southern Australia) Range

Species of Australian frog

The northern Flinders Ranges froglet (Crinia flindersensis), or Flinders Springs froglet, is a species of small frog that is endemic to Australia.

== Description ==
The species grows up to about 25 mm in length (SVL). Colouration is brown on the back, with darker patches; the belly is white with small brown spots; the male has a grey-brown throat. The fingers and toes are unwebbed.

== Behaviour ==
Eggs are laid beneath rocks in slow-flowing creeks.

== Distribution and habitat ==
The species occurs in the northern Flinders Ranges of South Australia.
