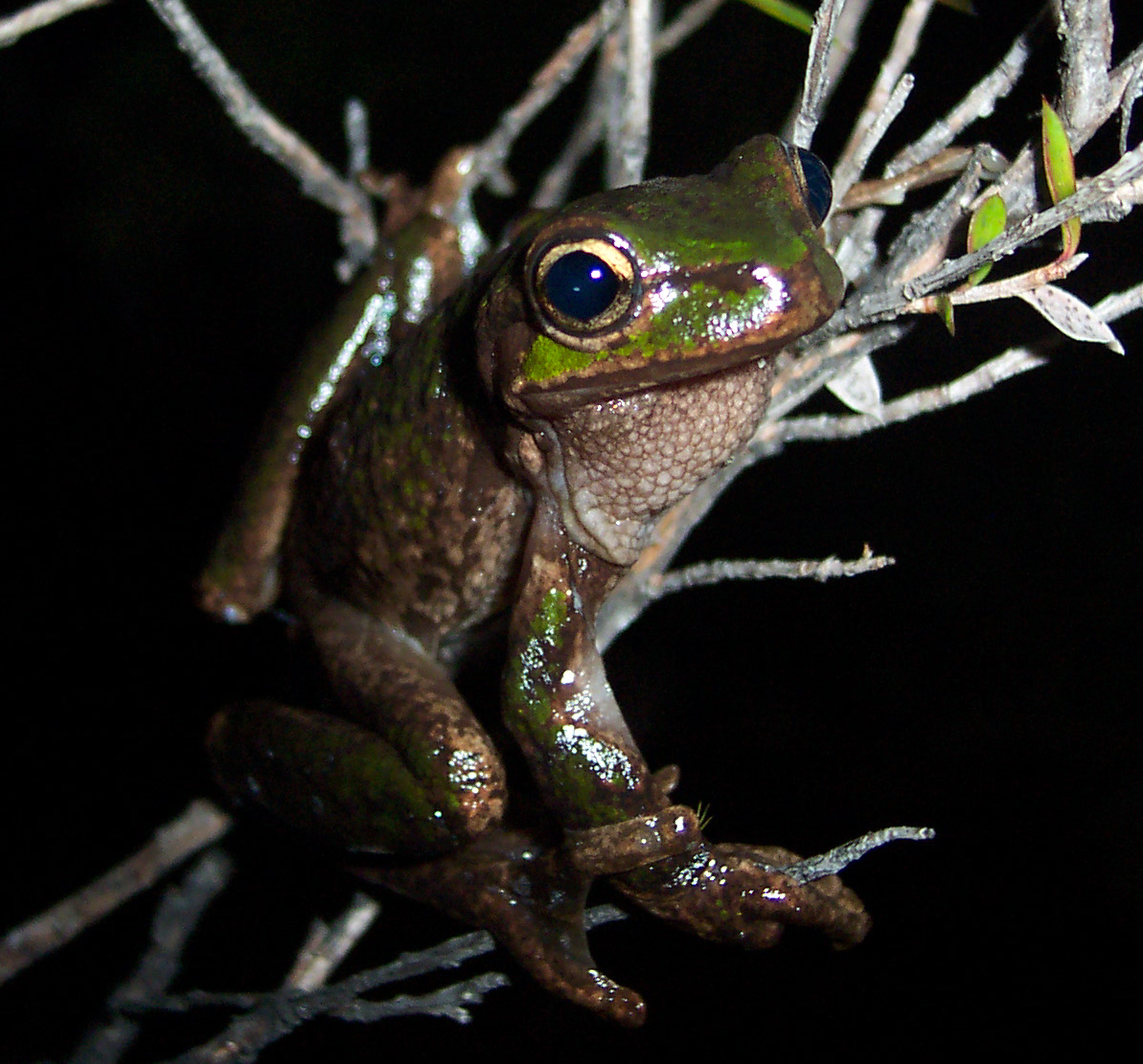

Conservation status
- Near Threatened (IUCN 3.1)

Scientific classification
- Kingdom: Animalia
- Phylum: Chordata
- Class: Amphibia
- Order: Anura
- Family: Pelodryadidae
- Genus: Saganura
- Species: S. burrowsae

Binomial name
- Saganura burrowsae Scott, 1942
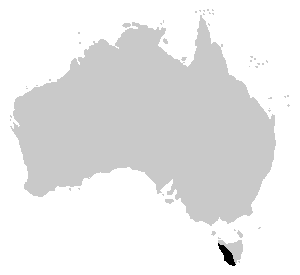
- Tasmanian tree frog range.

= Tasmanian tree frog =

Species of amphibian

The Tasmanian tree frog (Saganura burrowsae), also known as king tree frog, is a species of tree frog that is found on the west coast of Tasmania, Australia. It was first found by Myrtle Burrows in 1941, at Cradle Mountain and handed over to Scott Oswald, who is attributed with the discovery.

== Description ==
This is a moderate-sized tree frog, up to about 60 mm in length. It can be light green or dark brown on the dorsal surface. The brown form normally has some light brown patches and green flecks, while the green form often has light or dark brown patches. A thin stripe runs from the nostril down the side; this line often expands and becomes marbled along the flanks. The belly is pinkish-white and the thighs are light brown.

== Ecology and behaviour ==
This frog is associated with dams, ponds, and roadside ditches in rainforest, sedgeland, alpine country, and moorland in the west and south of Tasmania. It is often found at higher altitudes. The Tasmanian tree frog often mates after heavy rain, or in the spring or summer. Males make a goose-like call from vegetation around a water body or while floating in the water during spring and summer, often after rain. This is one of three species of frogs, along with the Tasmanian froglet and the moss froglet, endemic to Tasmania.

== Diet ==
The Tasmanian tree frog eats various insects. Despite sightings being common, the species' diet is poorly documented; as a result, not much is known about it.

== Breeding ==
Breeding occurs mainly in spring and summer, but the species may breed opportunistically at any time of the year after heavy rain. From 70–120 eggs are laid in clusters attached to submerged vegetation. Tadpoles occur in stationary or slowly flowing water. The larval stage lasts for 7–8 months.
