= Kimberley froglet =

Scientific classification
- Kingdom: Animalia
- Phylum: Chordata
- Class: Amphibia
- Order: Anura
- Family: Myobatrachidae
- Genus: Crinia
- Species: C. fimbriata

Binomial name
- Crinia fimbriata Doughty, Anstis & Price, 2009

Species of amphibian

The Kimberley froglet (Crinia fimbriata) is an Australian froglet found on the Mitchell Plateau in the north-west region of the Kimberley Mountains in Western Australia.

As part of National Science Week 2010, the froglet was listed as one of Australia's Top 10 New Species of new Australian species discovered in 2009.
