= Streambank froglet =

Conservation status
- Least Concern (IUCN 3.1)

Scientific classification
- Kingdom: Animalia
- Phylum: Chordata
- Class: Amphibia
- Order: Anura
- Family: Myobatrachidae
- Genus: Crinia
- Species: C. riparia

Binomial name
- Crinia riparia Littlejohn & Martin, 1965

Species of amphibian

The streambank froglet or Flinders Ranges froglet (Crinia riparia) is a small, locally common, Australian ground-dwelling frog, of the family Myobatrachidae.

== Description ==
The streambank froglet is a small frog (2.5 centimetres measured from snout to posterior). The colouring can be red, brown, tan, to drab olive green colour with many shades in between. Like its relatives Crinia signifera, this frog is of extremely variable markings, with great variety usually found within confined populations. The dorsal and ventral surfaces are very variable. The dorsal surface may be smooth or warty. The tympanum of this frog is not visible. The colour under the throat is pale grey, the ventral surface backwards from the front legs is white with granular, mottled black.

== Distribution ==
The streambank froglet is found only in the area around the Flinders Ranges and Gammon Ranges National Parks of central South Australia. It is found most often under rocks in springfed waterholes or cobbled pools in intermittently flowing streambeds.

== Ecology and behaviour ==
Because of the seasonality of the rain, and periodic flooding, the tadpoles of these frogs have sucker mouthparts and a streamlined, flattened profile adapted to hold on to the rocks even in canyons where water can be funneled into flowing very rapidly. The call of the male is a barely audible 'creeeak-crek' described as sounding like a creaking hinge.

The diet of the species consists of small insects, much smaller in comparison to their size to most frogs.
