= Remote froglet =

Conservation status
- Least Concern (IUCN 3.1)

Scientific classification
- Kingdom: Animalia
- Phylum: Chordata
- Class: Amphibia
- Order: Anura
- Family: Myobatrachidae
- Genus: Crinia
- Species: C. remota

Binomial name
- Crinia remota (Tyler & Parker, 1974)

Species of frog

The remote froglet (Crinia remota) is a species of frog in the family Myobatrachidae. It is found in Australia and New Guinea. Its natural habitats are moist savanna, subtropical or tropical dry lowland grassland, subtropical or tropical seasonally wet or flooded lowland grassland, swamps, freshwater lakes, freshwater marshes, intermittent freshwater marshes, coastal freshwater lagoons, and canals and ditches.
