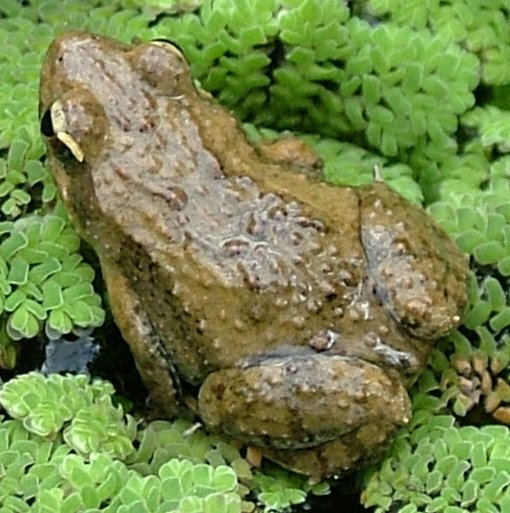

Conservation status
- Least Concern (IUCN 3.1)

Scientific classification
- Domain: Eukaryota
- Kingdom: Animalia
- Phylum: Chordata
- Class: Amphibia
- Order: Anura
- Family: Myobatrachidae
- Genus: Crinia
- Species: C. parinsignifera

Binomial name
- Crinia parinsignifera Main, 1957

= Eastern sign-bearing froglet =

Species of amphibian

The eastern sign-bearing froglet (Crinia parinsignifera) is a small, ground dwelling frog native to eastern Australia.

== Description ==
=== Physical ===
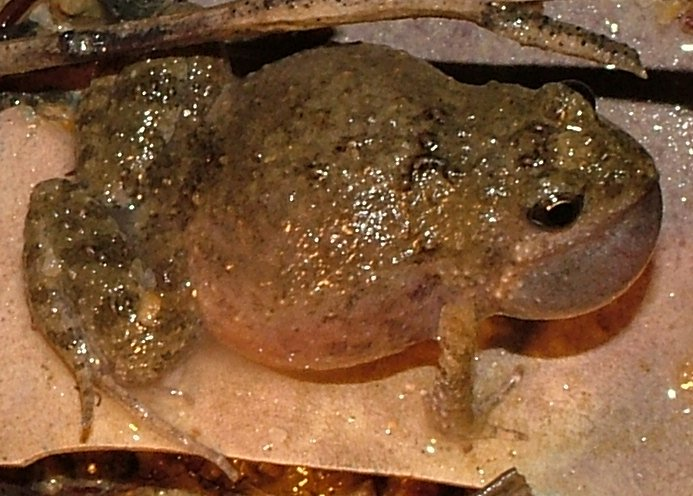
A calling male eastern sign-bearing froglet

As with all species within the genus Crinia, the eastern sign-bearing froglet is a small ground dwelling frog; reaching a length of 2.3 centimetres (0.91 in). It is highly variable in colour and markings, with some specimens being smooth skinned, and others having skin folds and warts on their dorsal surface.

The ventral surface is dark grey, and marbled in white of varying density. Due to the high variability in appearance, the eastern sign-bearing froglet cannot easily be distinguished from the common eastern froglet (Crinia signifera) and Sloane's froglet (Crinia sloanei) by dorsal appearance; however, advertisement call and belly colouration can be used to separate the species.

=== Ecology and behaviour ===
The eastern sign-bearing froglet habits swamps and ponds, and is often found under debris at the edge. The male calls from the edge of the pond; the call is a series of low squelching sounds, repeated every few seconds. Amplexus takes place at the edge of the breeding sites; eggs are laid in ponds singularly in shallow water.
