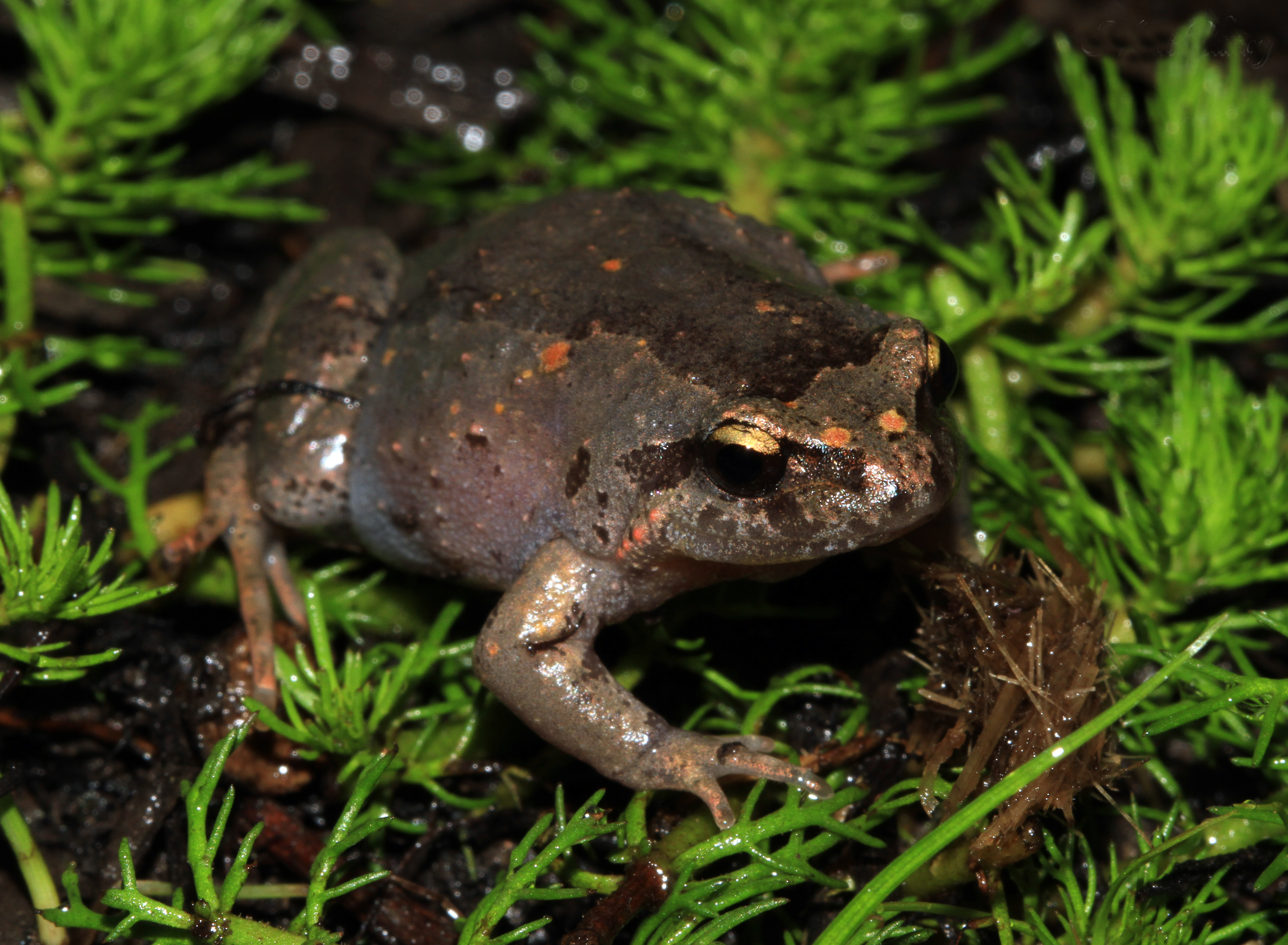

Conservation status
- Least Concern (IUCN 3.1)

Scientific classification
- Kingdom: Animalia
- Phylum: Chordata
- Class: Amphibia
- Order: Anura
- Family: Myobatrachidae
- Genus: Geocrinia
- Species: G. laevis

Binomial name
- Geocrinia laevis Günther, 1864

Synonyms
- Pterophrynus laevis (Günther, 1864); Crinia laevis (Günther, 1864)

= Geocrinia laevis =

Species of amphibian

Geocrinia laevis, the smooth frog, southern smooth froglet, smooth froglet, or Tasmanian smooth frog, is a species of frog in the family Myobatrachidae. It is endemic to Australia and found in Tasmania, southwestern Victoria (including the Grampians), and the extreme southeast of South Australia.

== Description ==
These frogs measure about 35 mm (1.4 in) in snout–vent length. They are grey or brown above, with scattered, small reddish spots with black edges, sometimes also with irregular, darker markings. The underside is white or light grey and has darker brown or grey flecks or mottling. Males have a bright yellow throat. The skin is smooth or with scattered low warts above, and smooth below.

== Habitat and conservation ==
Geocrinia laevis live in dry sclerophyll and pine forests at low altitudes. They often occur in damp locations and areas flooded after rain. The larvae develop in egg capsules until the breeding site is flooded, after which they hatch and continue development as aquatic tadpoles. The tadpole phase takes about six months.

This species is threatened by habitat clearing for agriculture and grazing, as well as logging in Tasmania. However, the overall population is considered stable, and the species occurs in several protected areas.
