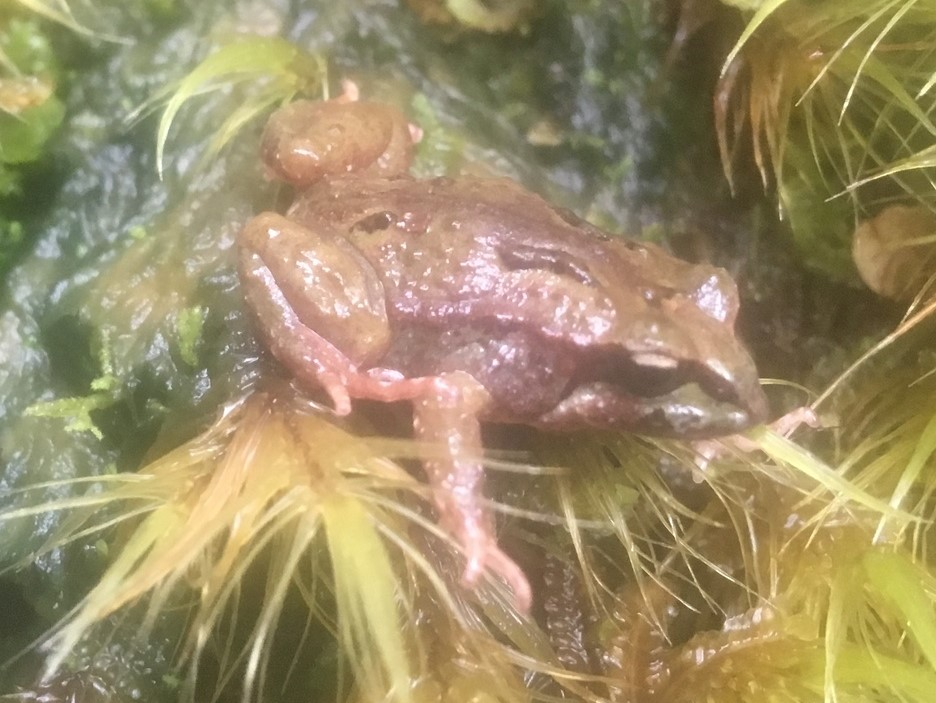

Conservation status
- Least Concern (IUCN 3.1)

Scientific classification
- Kingdom: Animalia
- Phylum: Chordata
- Class: Amphibia
- Order: Anura
- Family: Myobatrachidae
- Genus: Crinia
- Species: C. nimbus

Binomial name
- Crinia nimbus (Rounsevell, Ziegeler, Brown, Davies & Littlejohn, 1994)

Synonyms
- Bryobatrachus nimbus Rounsevell, Ziegeler, Brown, Davies & Littlejohn, 1994

= Moss froglet =

Species of frog

The moss froglet (Crinia nimbus) is a species of frog in the family Myobatrachidae. It is endemic to southern Tasmania.

== Description ==
Adult males measure 19–27 mm (0.7–1.1 in) and adult females 25–30 mm (1.0–1.2 in) in snout–vent length. The snout is short and projecting. The eyes are prominent. The tympanum is indistinct. The fingers and toes are unwebbed. Dorsal colouration ranges from very dark brown to grey-brown or tan. There are darker markings that are quite obscure in the darkest-coloured specimens. Some individuals have a pale or tan mid-vertebral stripe. Ventral surfaces are dark brown with fine white spots or pale with dark spots.

The male advertisement call is a series of tok's, likened to a ping-pong ball being dropped on wood.

== Habitat ==
Crinia nimbus is the only fully terrestrial frog in Tasmania. They live in moist, cool, alpine habitats, poorly drained sites in moor land (shrubland and heath), and rainforest, from the sea level to 1,287 m (4,222 ft). They are mostly quite cryptic and hide in vegetation and in the nest cavities, but males can be heard calling in spring to summer.

== Reproduction ==
Females lay clutches of 4–16 egg in nests in moss, lichen, or peat. The larvae hatch inside egg capsules. After a while, egg capsules disintegrate, but the larvae continue their development in the resulting gelatinous mass as free-living, but non-feeding larvae. They only leave the nest after completing the metamorphosis, about one year after starting their development.

== Conservation ==
Crinia nimbus is probably widespread in southwestern Tasmania. There are no know threats to it, although the terrestrial nests are vulnerable to trampling by animals and people (tourists and researchers alike). Most of the range is protected by national parks.
