= Sloane's froglet =

Conservation status
- Endangered (EPBC Act)

Scientific classification
- Kingdom: Animalia
- Phylum: Chordata
- Class: Amphibia
- Order: Anura
- Family: Myobatrachidae
- Genus: Crinia
- Species: C. sloanei

Binomial name
- Crinia sloanei Littlejohn, 1958
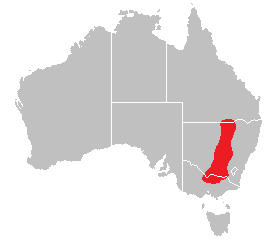
- Distribution of Sloane's froglet

Synonyms
- Ranidella sloanei (Littlejohn, 1958)

Species of frog

Sloane's froglet (Crinia sloanei) is a species of frog in the family Myobatrachidae. It is endemic to Australia. Its natural habitats are subtropical or tropical seasonally wet or flooded lowland grassland and intermittent freshwater marshes in and around the floodplains of the Murray–Darling Basin.

== Description ==
The Sloane's froglet is dull grey in colour, with darker flecks or lines on its skinfolds and warts. Adults are about 25mm in length. Their call has described as both a single, low 'squelch', and as a short, high pitched 'chirp'.

== Habitat and range ==
Sloane's froglet can be found in and around temporarily indundated grasslands. Its distribution is still not properly understood, however significant populations have been recorded in the Albury and Corowa regions of NSW, as well as in the Wahgunyah/Rutherglen region of Victoria. A small population has also been recorded as far north as Mungindi, on the border of NSW and Queensland.

== Conservation status ==
=== Internationally ===
- Crinia sloanei is listed as Data deficient by the International Union for Conservation of Nature (IUCN)

=== Australia ===
- The Sloane's froglet is listed as Endangered on the Australian EPBC Act.
- The froglet is listed as Endangered in NSW under the Biodiversity Conservation Act 2016.
- The species is listed as Endangered in Victoria under the Flora and Fauna Guarantee Act 1988.
