= False western froglet =

Conservation status
- Least Concern (IUCN 3.1)

Scientific classification
- Kingdom: Animalia
- Phylum: Chordata
- Class: Amphibia
- Order: Anura
- Family: Myobatrachidae
- Genus: Crinia
- Species: C. pseudinsignifera

Binomial name
- Crinia pseudinsignifera Main, 1957

Species of frog

The false western froglet (Crinia pseudinsignifera), also called bleating froglet and Darling Plateau froglet, is a species of frog in the family Myobatrachidae. It is endemic to southwestern portions of Western Australia. Its natural habitats are temperate forests, rivers, intermittent rivers, shrub-dominated wetlands, swamps, freshwater lakes, intermittent freshwater lakes, freshwater marshes, intermittent freshwater marshes, freshwater springs, rocky areas, arable land, pastureland, plantations, water storage areas, ponds, open excavations, wastewater treatment areas, seasonally flooded agricultural land, and canals and ditches. It is threatened by habitat loss.
