= Small western froglet =

Conservation status
- Least Concern (IUCN 3.1)

Scientific classification
- Kingdom: Animalia
- Phylum: Chordata
- Class: Amphibia
- Order: Anura
- Family: Myobatrachidae
- Genus: Crinia
- Species: C. subinsignifera

Binomial name
- Crinia subinsignifera Littlejohn, 1957

Species of frog

The small western froglet (Crinia subinsignifera) is a species of frog in the family Myobatrachidae. It is endemic to Australia. Its natural habitats are temperate forests, subtropical or tropical seasonally wet or flooded lowland grassland, swamps, freshwater lakes, intermittent freshwater lakes, freshwater marshes, and intermittent freshwater marshes. It is threatened by habitat loss.
