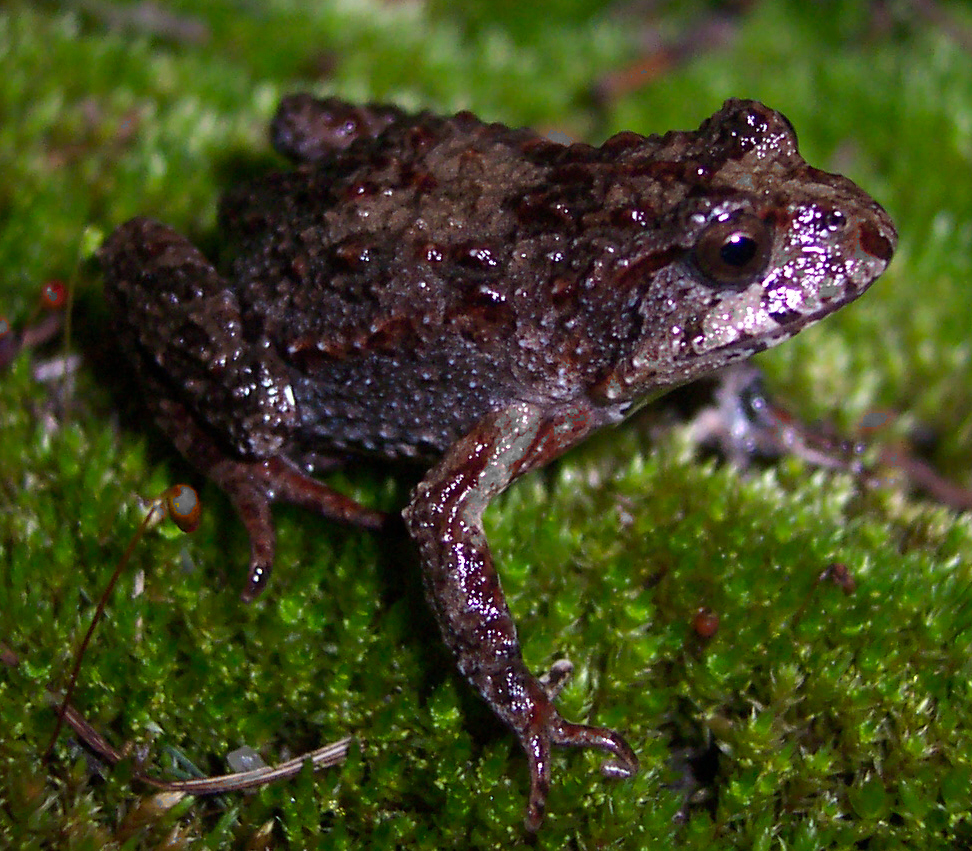

Conservation status
- Near Threatened (IUCN 3.1)

Scientific classification
- Kingdom: Animalia
- Phylum: Chordata
- Class: Amphibia
- Order: Anura
- Family: Myobatrachidae
- Genus: Crinia
- Species: C. tasmaniensis

Binomial name
- Crinia tasmaniensis Günther, 1864
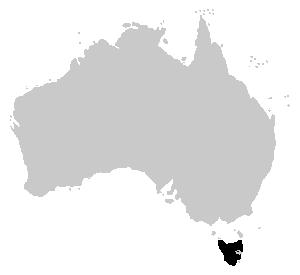
- Tasmanian froglet range

= Tasmanian froglet =

Species of amphibian

The Tasmanian froglet (Crinia tasmaniensis) is a species of ground-dwelling frog that occurs only in Tasmania, Australia.

== Description ==
This is a fairly small species of frog, up to about 30 mm. It is variable, but is generally brown (dark to reddish) or grey and can have spots or blotches of another colour, at times this species can be completely dark brown or black, with no variation in colour throughout the dorsal surface. The dorsal surface can be bumpy or smooth. There is often a reddish stripe present from the nostril down the side. The ventral surface is mostly white, however it has some red and dark blotches as well as red in the thighs.

== Ecology and behaviour ==
This species of frog is only found in Tasmania. It inhabits shallow streams, temporary ponds and puddles, dams, swamps and soaks, mostly at higher altitudes throughout most of the state. It is frequently encountered in the west of the state. It can be found in rainforest, cleared, woodland and alpine habitats.

Males make a lamb-like call, baaahh-ahh-aahh, from land beside water or while floating in water, mainly in spring and summer.

Up to 100 eggs are laid in still water all year round. The eggs have rather large capsules, about 7 mm (0.28 in). Tadpoles are brown-grey and reach 30 mm (1.2 in) in length. Development takes about 3 months and metamorph are about 10 mm (0.39 in) and resemble the adult.

This is one of only three species of frogs endemic to Tasmania.

== Sources ==
- Frogs Australia Network-frog call available here.
- Anstis, M. 2002. Tadpoles of South-eastern Australia. Reed New Holland: Sydney.
- Robinson, M. 2002. A Field Guide to Frogs of Australia. Australian Museum/Reed New Holland: Sydney.
