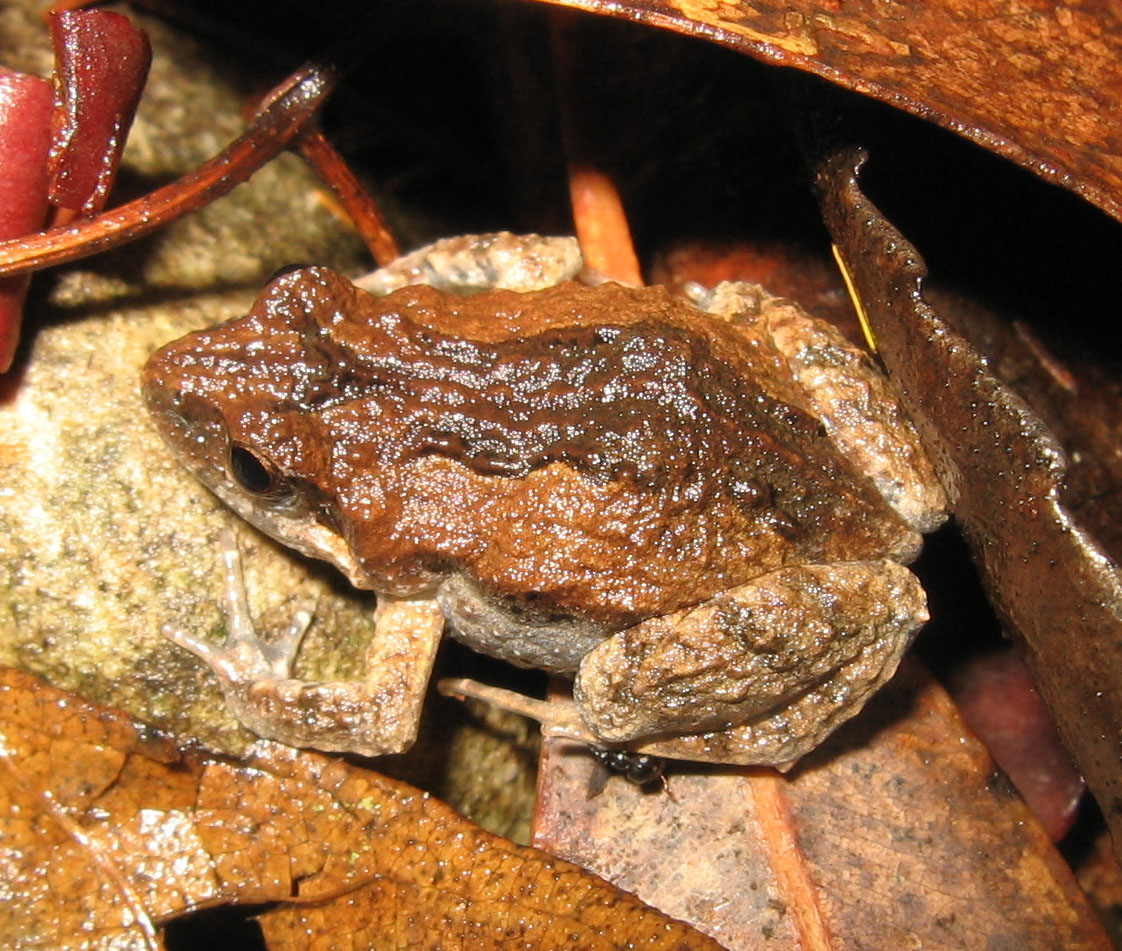

Conservation status
- Least Concern (IUCN 3.1)

Scientific classification
- Kingdom: Animalia
- Phylum: Chordata
- Class: Amphibia
- Order: Anura
- Family: Myobatrachidae
- Genus: Crinia
- Species: C. signifera

Binomial name
- Crinia signifera Girard, 1853
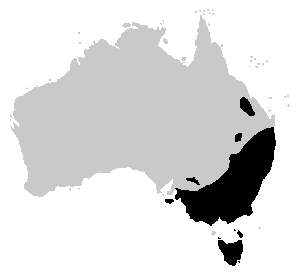
- Common eastern froglet range

= Common eastern froglet =

Species of amphibian

The common eastern froglet (Crinia signifera) is a very common, Australian ground-dwelling frog, of the family Myobatrachidae. They are also referred to as 'gunggung' by the Dharug people of the Sydney basin.

== Distribution ==
The common eastern froglet ranges from southeastern Australia, from Adelaide to Melbourne, up the eastern coast to Brisbane. It also inhabits a majority of Tasmania. It is one of the most commonly encountered frog species within its range, due to its ability to occupy several habitat types.

== Description ==
The common eastern froglet is a small frog (approx. 3 centimetres), of brown or grey colour of various shades. The frog is of extremely variable markings, with great variety usually found within confined populations. A dark, triangular mark is found on the upper lip, with darker bands on the legs. A small white spot is on the base of each arm. The dorsal and ventral surfaces are very variable. The dorsal surface may be smooth, warty or have longitudinal skin folds. The colour varies from dark brown, fawn, light and dark grey. The colour of the ventral surface is similar to the dorsal surface, but mottled with white spots.

== Ecology and behaviour ==
The common eastern froglet will call within a large chorus of males close to a still water source, or slow flowing creek. The call of the male is a crik-crik-crik; this is heard all year round, during wet and dry conditions. An average of about 100-150 eggs are laid in small clusters attached to submerged vegetation. The tadpoles and eggs survive in 14–15 °C water. Tadpoles are normally brown and reach about 36mm in length. Development is relatively short, it takes between 2.5–3 months for tadpoles to develop into frogs, it can be dependent on environmental conditions. At a temperature of 15 °C development can range from 6 weeks to more than 3 months. Metamorph frogs are very small, about 8 mm.

The diet of the species consists of small insects, much smaller in comparison to their size than most frogs.

Common Eastern Froglet
Call recorded at Kobble Creek, SE Queensland
