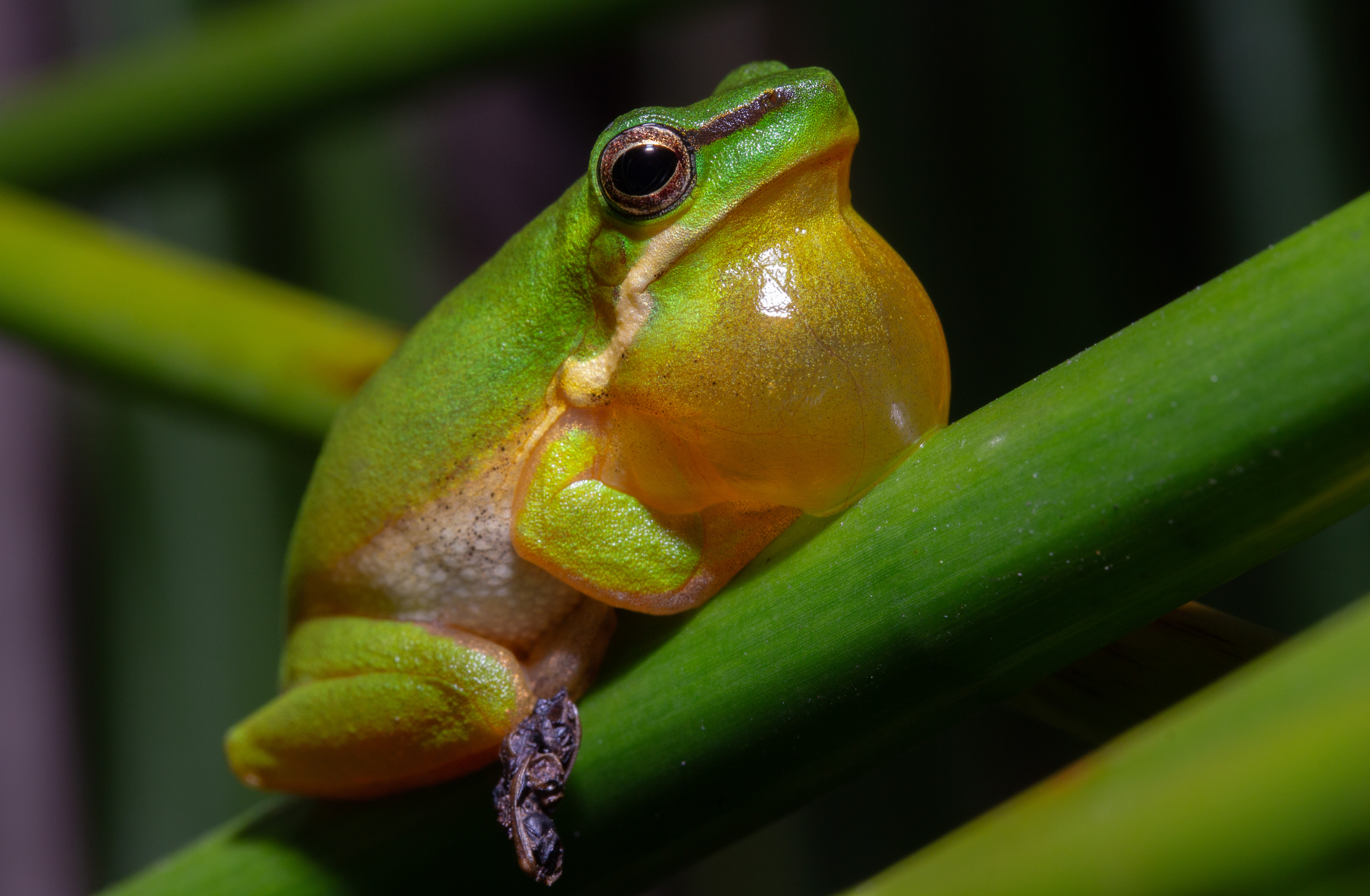
- Calling male eastern dwarf tree frog - Sydney Olympic Park

Conservation status
- Least Concern (IUCN 3.1)

Scientific classification
- Kingdom: Animalia
- Phylum: Chordata
- Class: Amphibia
- Order: Anura
- Family: Pelodryadidae
- Genus: Drymomantis
- Species: D. fallax

Binomial name
- Drymomantis fallax Peters, 1880
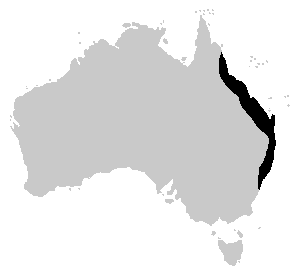
- Eastern dwarf tree frog distribution

Synonyms
- Hylomantis fallax Peters, 1880; Hyla bicolor glauerti Copland, 1957; Hyla glauerti Straughan, 1969; Litoria glauerti Tyler, 1971; Litoria fallax Cogger and Lindner, 1974; Dryomantis fallax Wells and Wellington, 1985; Dryomantis glauerti Wells and Wellington, 1985

= Eastern dwarf tree frog =

Species of amphibian

The eastern dwarf tree frog (Drymomantis fallax), also known as the eastern sedge frog, is a species of tree frog native to Australia. It is a small and very common frog found on the eastern coast of Australia, from approximately Cairns, Queensland to Ulladulla, New South Wales. Individual frogs of this species are often found elsewhere, having been accidentally relocated by transported fruit or horticultural products. Two naturalised populations are known outside of its native range: a population successfully established on Guam around 1968, and breeding populations have established in multiple suburbs of Melbourne, Victoria.

== Description ==
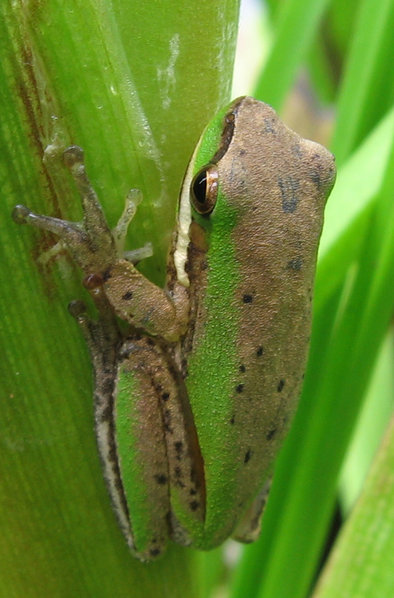
Brown and green colouration of the eastern dwarf tree frog, Stratford, NSW

The eastern dwarf tree frog is a small species of frog; females can reach a maximum size of 25–30 mm, while males may only reach 20 mm when fully grown. The dorsum is usually green in colour, but can range from brown to bright green, and occasionally has black flecks. The ventral surface is white with a granular texture. A distinct white line runs from under the eye to above the arm. A brown line begins from the nostril, continues across the eye, and can extend between the dorsal and ventral colours. This species' toe discs are only slightly larger than the toes, and toes are 75% webbed. Some individuals will have an orange posterior thigh, and the vocal sac of males is yellow. The tadpoles are larger than the adult frogs reaching a total length of 48 mm.

== Taxonomy ==
D. fallax was first described in 1880 by Wilhelm Peters as Hylomantis fallax. The Australian Faunal Directory also considers Hyla bicolor glauerti to be a synonym, with the decision for synonymy being based on Cogger.

== Ecology and behaviour ==
The eastern dwarf tree frog lives in a wide variety of habitats, breeding in the still waters of coastal swamps, lagoons, dams, ditches, and garden ponds within forest, heathland, wallum country and human-altered farmland and suburban areas. It lives in reeds and similar plants both near and away from the water, and often inhabits banana, pandanus and pineapple plants. Due to this habitation of farmland, eastern dwarf tree frogs are often accidentally shipped throughout Australia with fruit.

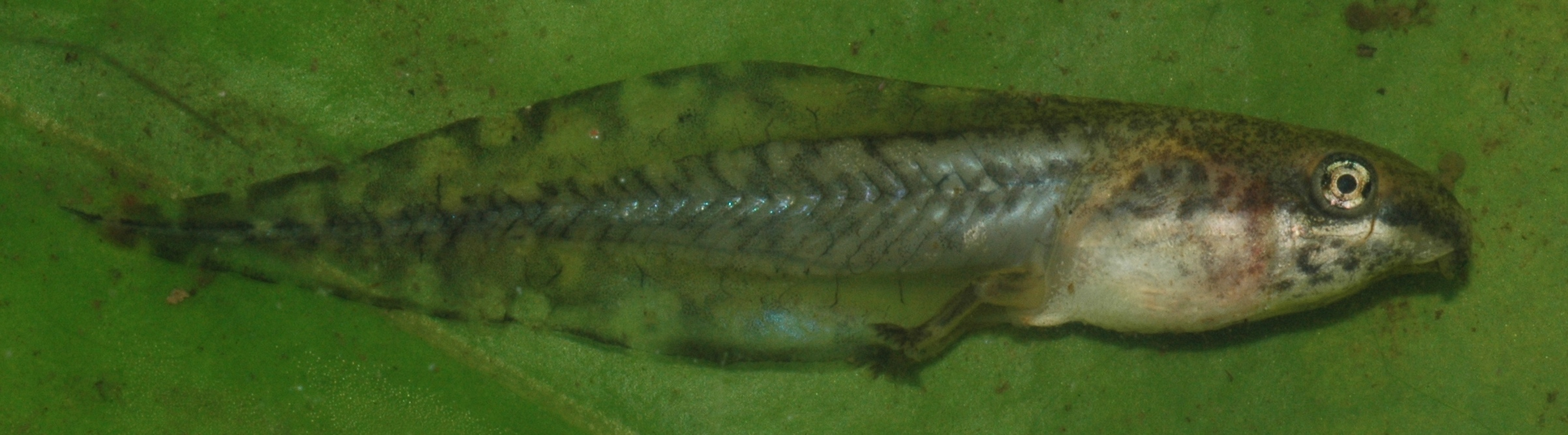
Litoria fallax tadpole

Breeding occurs at small ponds or dams, which have ample reeds or other emergent vegetation, in both permanent and temporary water sources. The males' call is a short, high pitched "wr-e-e-ek ip-ip" repeated three or four times. They emit their calls from a single submandibular vocal sac. The males call during the spring and summer seasons, often increasing the frequency of calls before and after heavy rain.

Calling males have been observed semaphoring using foot-flicking and leg waving behaviours, often preceding these males fighting. It is hypothesised that these behaviours are territorial and aid their calling behaviours in noisy environments. Most other Pelodryadids that exhibit these behaviours inhabit noisy stream environments, but it has been observed for the eastern dwarf tree frog and the related Cooloola sedge frog in lentic environments that are loud due to other calling frogs.

During amplexus, a female lays a series of egg clusters that they attach to submerged vegetation. Each cluster contains a range of 2-35 eggs, reaching a total of 263-1363 eggs during each amplexus. Tadpole lifespan has been recorded as 10–19 weeks and metamorphosis occurs from January to April. The metamorphs resemble the adults but are very small, reaching only 14–16 mm in length when first emerging.

== Similar species ==
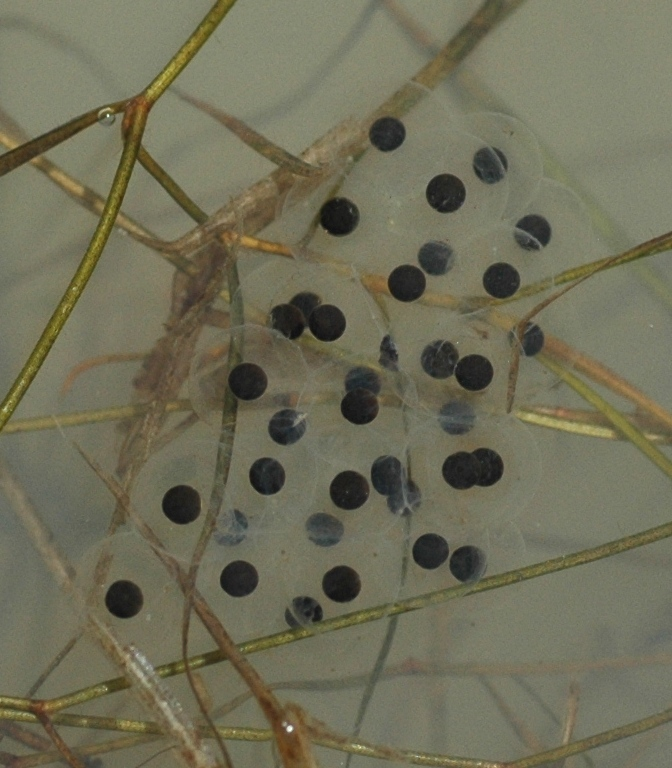
Litoria fallax spawn

The eastern dwarf tree frog is a member of the dwarf tree frog complex. This species complex is composed of the northern dwarf tree frog (Carichyla bicolor), the Cooloola sedge frog (D. cooloolensis), and the wallum sedge frog (D. olongburensis). All of these species are similar in size and appearance and have a similar ratchet-like call. The Cooloola sedge frog is the most distinct with a highly mottled dorsum, whilst the wallum sedge frog can be distinguished by its sharper nose.

== As a pet ==
In Australia, the frog may be kept in captivity with the appropriate permit.

Eastern dwarf tree frog
Call recorded at Samsonvale Cemetery, SE Queensland

== Other sources ==
- Article Road: List of All Frog Breeds: Things You Can Do to Ensure Your Frog Has a Long, Happy and Healthy Life: Eastern Dwarf Tree Frog
- Anstis, M. 2002. Tadpoles of South-eastern Australia. Reed New Holland: Sydney.
- Robinson, M. 2002. A Field Guide to Frogs of Australia. Australian Museum/Reed New Holland: Sydney.
- Frogs Australia Network
- Australian Frogs A Natural History, Michael J. Tyler (1994)
