= Brown frog (disambiguation) =

The brown frog (Rana) is a genus of about 50 species of true frogs found through much of Eurasia, North America, Africa, Central America, and the northern half of South America.

Brown frog may also refer to:

- Brown ball frog or West African brown frog (Aubria subsigillata), a frog in the family Pyxicephalidae found in Cameroon, Equatorial Guinea, Gabon, and possibly Nigeria
- Brown banana frog (Afrixalus dorsalis), a frog in the family Hyperoliidae found in Angola, Cameroon, Republic of the Congo, Democratic Republic of the Congo, Ivory Coast, Equatorial Guinea, Gabon, Ghana, Guinea, Liberia, Nigeria, Sierra Leone, and possibly Togo
- Brown bromeliad frog (Crossodactylodes pintoi), a frog in the family Leptodactylidae endemic to southeastern Brazil
- Brown leaping frog (Indirana semipalmata a frog in the family Ranixalidae endemic to the Western Ghats of India
- Brown rice frog (Microhyla fusca), a frog in the family Microhylidae endemic to Vietnam
- Brown thorny frog (Chaperina fusca), a frog in the family Microhylidae found on the Malay Peninsula, Borneo, and the Philippines
- Brown tropical frog (Micrixalus fuscus), a frog in the family Micrixalidae found in the Western Ghats of India
- Plains brown tree frog (Litoria paraewingi), a frog in the family Hylidae endemic to Australia
- Southern brown tree frog (Litoria ewingii), a frog in the family Hylidae native to southeastern Australia including Tasmania

== See also ==
- Brown-striped frog (Limnodynastes peronii), a frog in the family Myobatrachidae native to coastal Eastern Australia
- Chestnut-brown frog (Fejervarya andamanensis), a frog in the family Dicroglossidae only found in the Andaman Islands, India
