= Whistling frog =

Whistling frog may refer to:

- Montserrat whistling frog, a frog found in the Americas
- Whistling rain frog, a frog found in South Africa, Eswatini, and possibly Mozambique
- Whistling tree frog, a frog found in New South Wales, Victoria, and Queensland
- Whistling tree frog (Southern Australia), a frog found in Victoria, South Australia, New South Wales, Tasmania, and New Zealand
- White-browed whistling frog, a frog endemic to Australia
