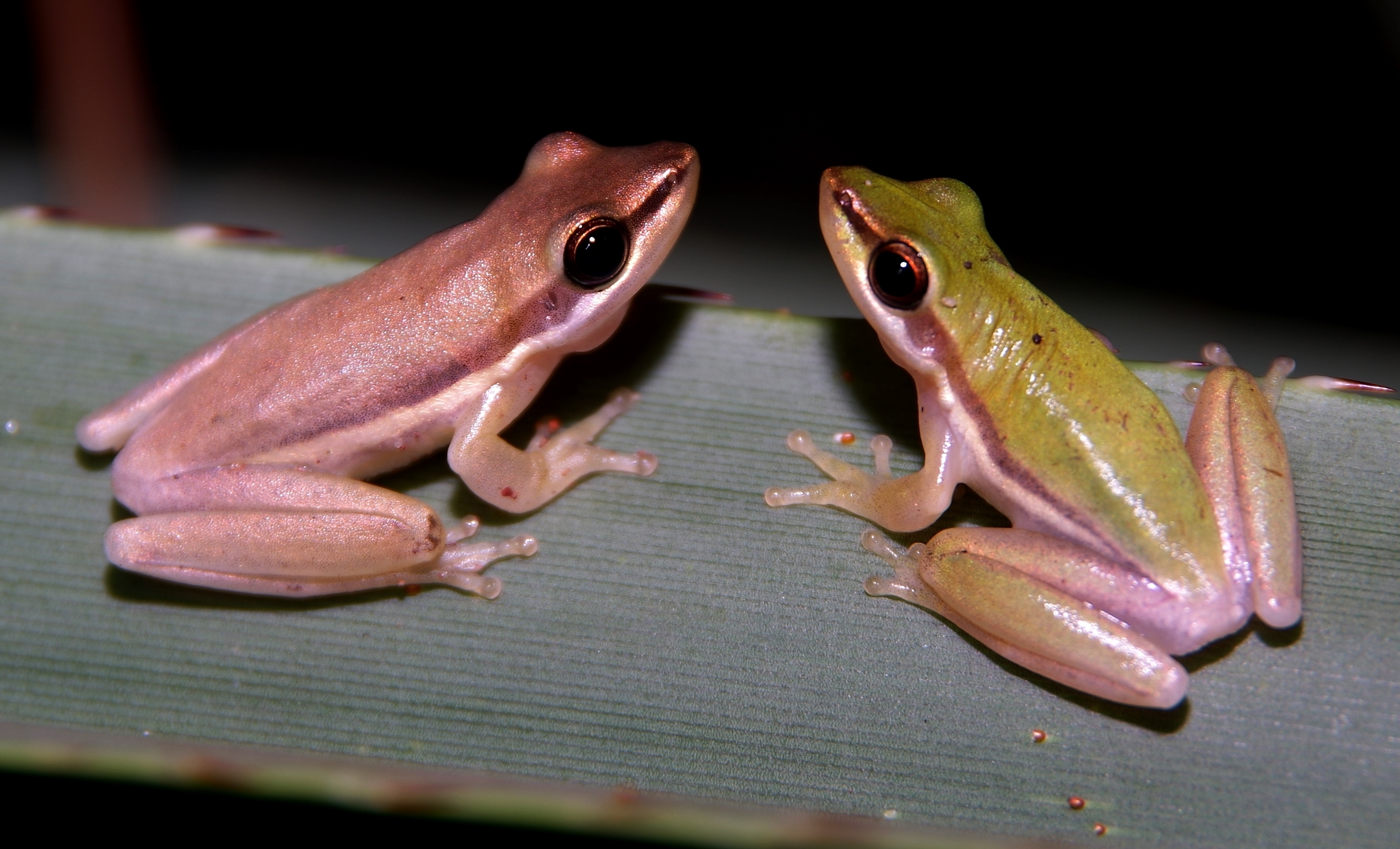
- Two different colour morphs at Fogg Dam, Northern Territory

Conservation status
- Least Concern (IUCN 3.1)

Scientific classification
- Kingdom: Animalia
- Phylum: Chordata
- Class: Amphibia
- Order: Anura
- Family: Pelodryadidae
- Genus: Carichyla
- Species: Carichyla

Binomial name
- Carichyla Gray, 1842
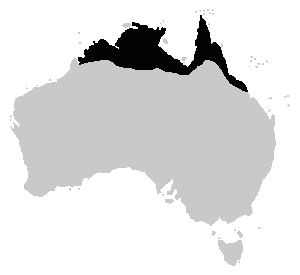
- distribution in Australia

= Northern dwarf tree frog =

Species of frog

The northern dwarf tree frog (Carichyla bicolor) is a small species of tree frog native to northern Australia, from the Kimberly region of Western Australia to Bowen, Queensland, and Aru Islands of Indonesia.

These small frogs are also commonly called sedge frogs.

== Description ==
The northern dwarf tree frog is small, slender tree frog growing up to 30 mm in length.

It has a green dorsal surface and a thin bronze dorsolateral band that begins at the eye.

There is often a central bronze band running along the spine of the back. A narrow white stripe runs from under the eye, at the corner of the mouth, to the base of the arm. The ventral surface is cream or yellowish, with golden reflections on the thighs and groin area. The male throat is speckled with a darker color. The skin is granular in the belly and femoral region, but smooth elsewhere.

The iris of the eye is golden, the eardrum is distinct, the vomerine teeth are absent, and there is a strong pectoral fold. There are disks on the fingers and toes, the fingers are slightly webbed, and the fringed fingers are about three-quarters of a palm. There is an inner but not outer metatarsal tubercle, and the second finger is longer than the first.

== Ecology and behaviour ==
Most abundant in grassland or marshy areas, but also occurs along permanent or semi-permanent streams, billabongs and floodplains. Breeding starts with summer rains and 10-24 eggs are laid on submerged vegetation in temporary pools. Males call from around the breeding site from elevated positions. The call is a "wree-e-eck pippip" with the second part of the call starting before the first part finishes. Tadpole metamorphosis takes 70 to 80 days.

== Similar species ==
The northern dwarf tree frog is similar in appearance to the eastern dwarf tree frog (D. fallax), Cooloola tree frog (D. cooloolensis) and Olongburra frog (D. olongburensis). All these species are similar in appearance (small, <30 mm and similar body shape) and have a similar call (ratchet-like "wreek"). The northern dwarf tree frog is most similar to the eastern dwarf tree frog. They occur together along the east coast of Queensland. C. bicolor can be distinguished from D. fallax most readily by the presence of a bronze stripe that runs down the flanks and the call. The first phase of the call of C. bicolor is twice as long as that of D. fallax.

== Gallery ==
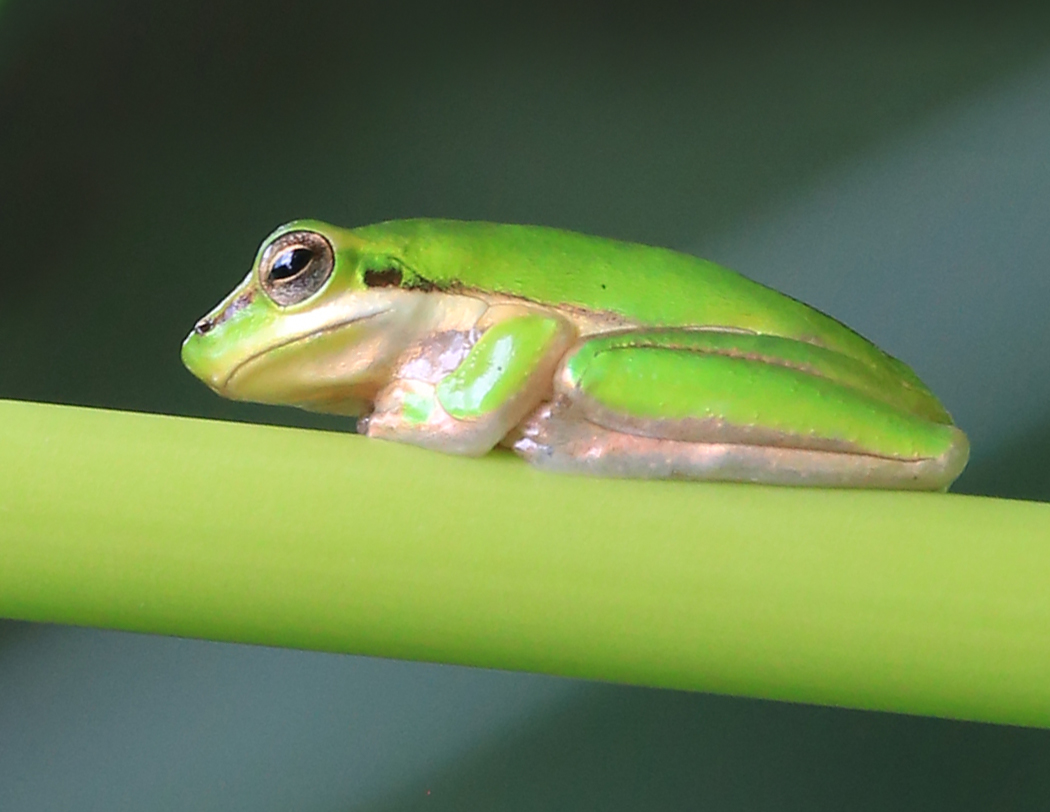
Green form in Cairns, Queensland

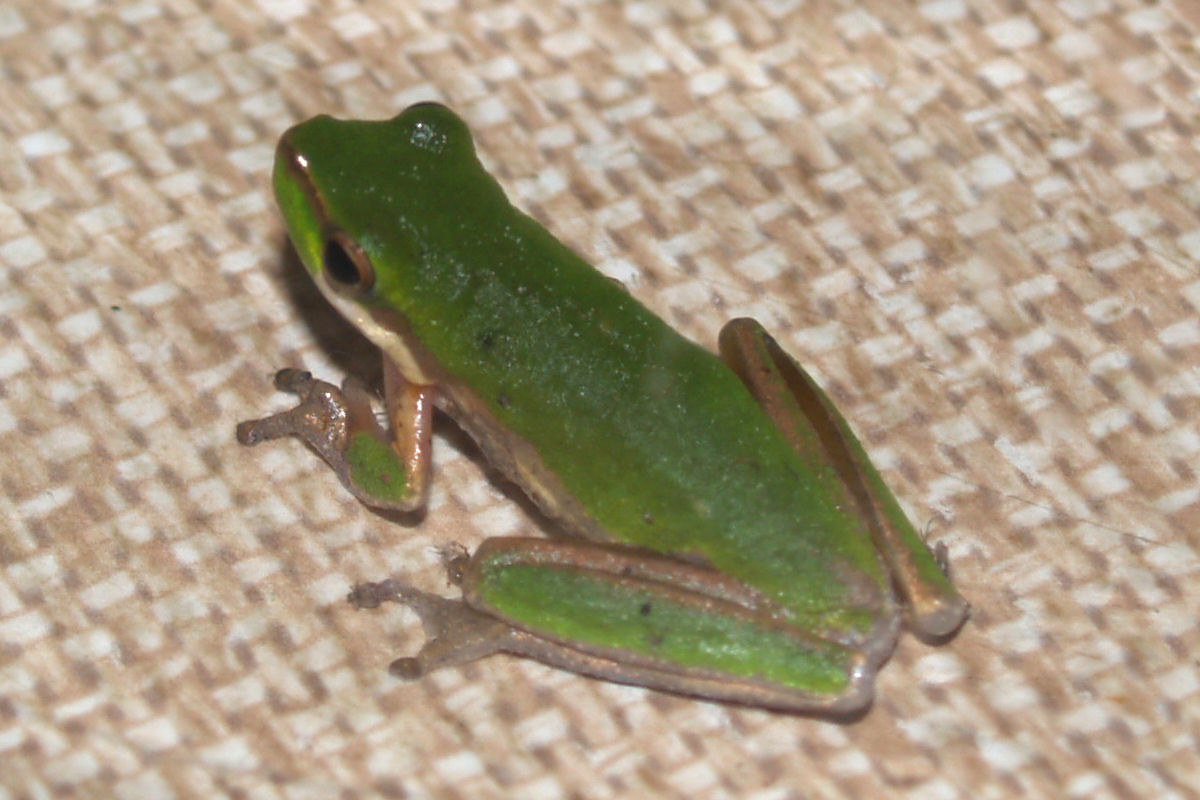
In rainforest at Kuranda, Queensland
