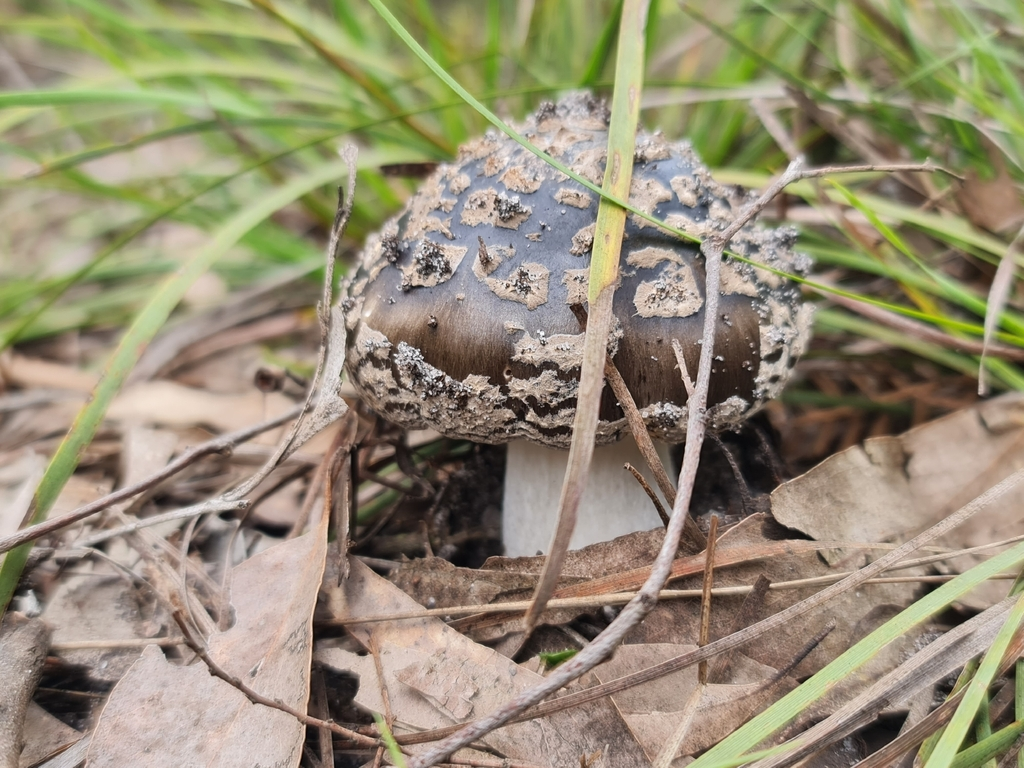

Scientific classification
- Kingdom: Fungi
- Division: Basidiomycota
- Class: Agaricomycetes
- Order: Agaricales
- Family: Amanitaceae
- Genus: Amanita
- Species: A. umbrinella

Binomial name
- Amanita umbrinella E.-J. Gilbert & J.B. Cleland (1941)

Synonyms
- Amanitaria umbrinella E.-J. Gilbert & Cleland (1940), nom. inval.; Amanita umbrinelloides A.E.Wood (1997)

= Amanita umbrinella =

Species of mushroom

Amanita umbrinella
- Mycological characteristics
- Gills on hymenium
- Cap is convex or flat
- Hymenium is free
- Stipe has a ring and volva
- Spore print is white
- Ecology is mycorrhizal
- Edibility is unknown

Amanita umbrinella, more commonly known as Australian umber amanita, is a species of fungus in the genus Amanita. It is found in Australia.

== Description ==
The cap is convex before it becomes flat, with the center becoming depressed; it is around 70–100 mm in diameter and breaks into patches as it ages; it can be brownish-gray, buff grey, or olivaceous-black. The stripe is clavate and is 70–120 mm long, 10–25 mm wide. It has a bulb that is about 25 mm long. It has a white, striated ring. The gills are free from the stem, and it is white, cream, or light buff. The spores of Amanita umbrinellla are white. They are ellipsoid and measure 8.3–9.6 × 5.4–6.9 μm and are inamyloid.

== Habitat and distribution ==
Amanita umbrinella is found growing in sandy soil in South Australia, Western Australia, and the Wallum woodland. Amanita umbrinella was also reported from New South Wales with eucalyptus trees.
