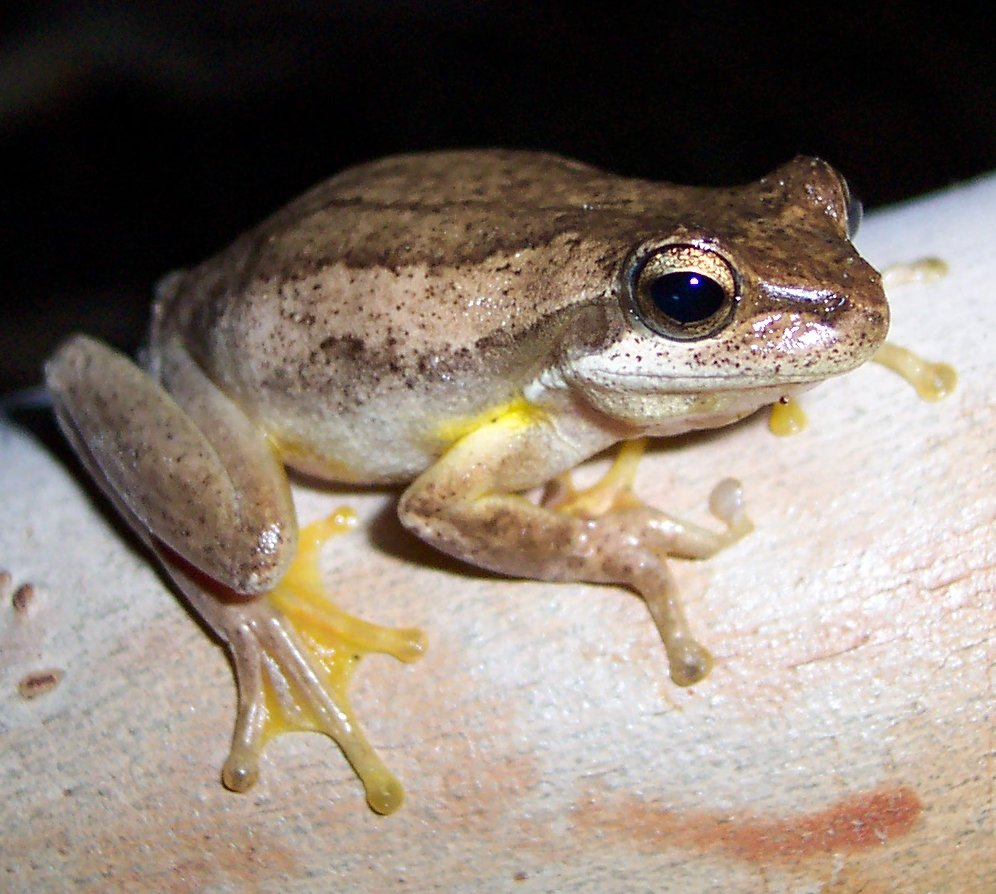

Conservation status
- Least Concern (IUCN 3.1)

Scientific classification
- Kingdom: Animalia
- Phylum: Chordata
- Class: Amphibia
- Order: Anura
- Family: Pelodryadidae
- Genus: Rawlinsonia
- Species: R. jervisiensis

Binomial name
- Rawlinsonia jervisiensis (Duméril & Bibron, 1841)
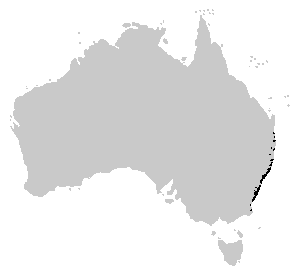
- Distribution of the Jervis Bay Tree Frog

Synonyms
- Hyla jervisiensis Duméril and Bibron, 1841; Hyla oculata Fitzinger, 1861; Hyla kreffti Günther, 1863; Hyla servesiensis Krefft, 1863; Litoria jervisiensis Peters, 1873; Hyla jervisiensis Boulenger, 1882; Hyla ewingi var. krefftii Fry, 1915; Rawlinsonia jervisiensis Wells and Wellington, 1985; Rawlinsonia kreffti Wells and Wellington, 1985

= Jervis Bay tree frog =

Species of amphibian

The Jervis Bay tree frog (Rawlinsonia jervisiensis), also known as the curry frog in reference to its odour, is a species of Australian frog associated with wallum swampland along the east coast of New South Wales; ranging from the Queensland border to eastern Victoria.

== Description ==
This is a moderately large species of tree frog, up to 55 mm in length. It is normally brown in dorsal colour and has a large double band on the back starting from between the eyes and down to the vent; this band may be indistinct in some specimens. It has a dark band starting at the snout and ending at the base of the arms. The armpits are coloured yellow and the thighs red-orange. The iris is golden-brown in colour. Toe discs are large and the toes are webbed.

== Taxonomy ==
Until 1994, this species was not recognised as distinct from the heath frog, Rawlinsonia littlejohni. The heath frog is larger in size and has orange instead of yellow in the armpits.

== Ecology and behaviour ==
This species of frog is strongly associated with coastal swamps, particularly wallum swampland. Males call in the cooler months, normally after rain. The call is a three-noted "weep-weep-weep". Breeding tends to take place in larger, permanent water bodies.

== See also ==
- Jervis Bay
