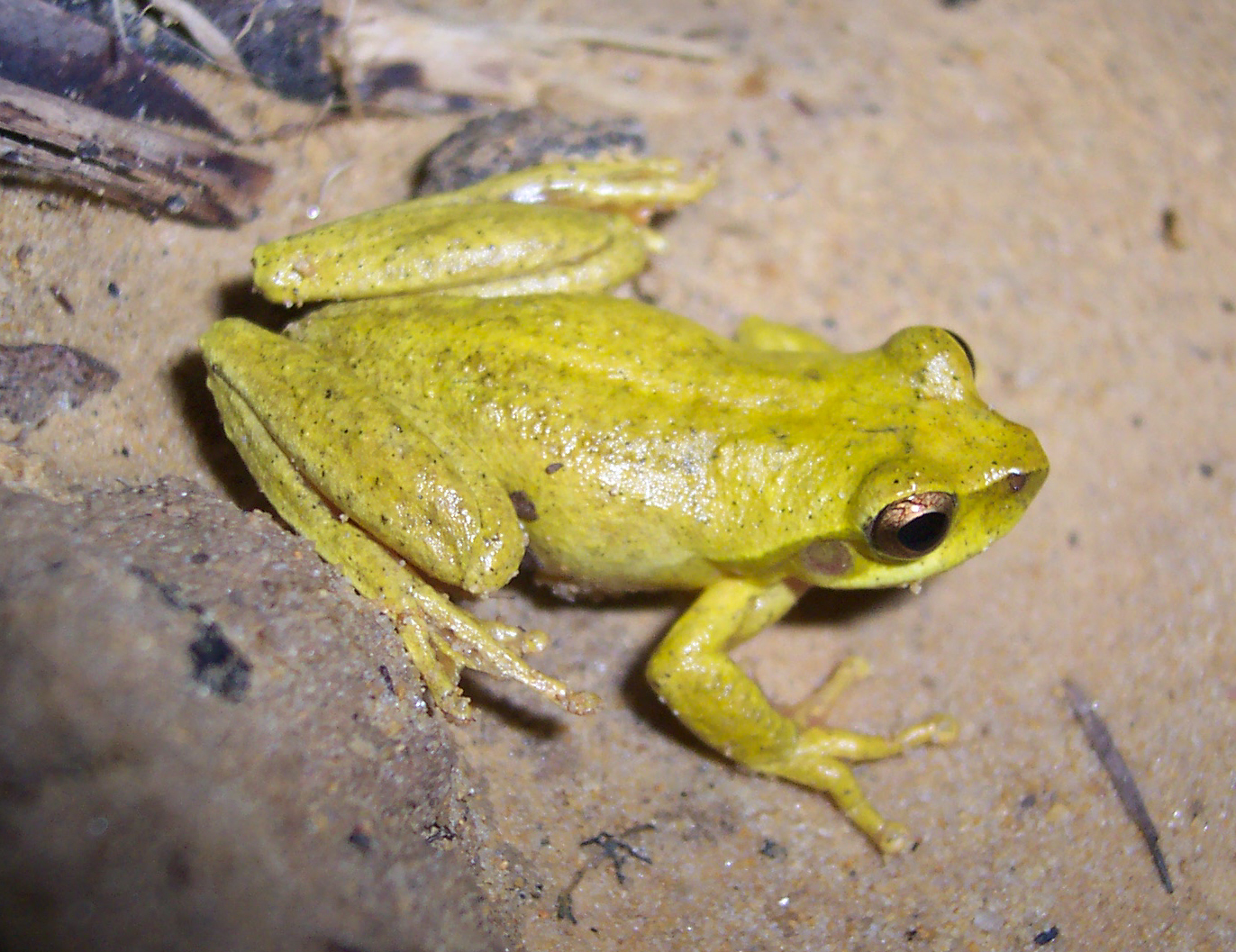

Conservation status
- Least Concern (IUCN 3.1)

Scientific classification
- Kingdom: Animalia
- Phylum: Chordata
- Class: Amphibia
- Order: Anura
- Family: Pelodryadidae
- Genus: Rawlinsonia
- Species: R. revelata

Binomial name
- Rawlinsonia revelata (Ingram, Corben & Hosmer, 1982)
- Distributions of the three whirring tree frogs: R. revelata in red, R. corbeni in purple and R. eungellensis in blue.

Synonyms
- Litoria revelata Ingram, Corben & Hosmer, 1982

= Revealed frog =

Species of amphibian

The revealed frog, whirring tree frog, or orange-thighed treefrog (Rawlinsonia revelata) is a species of tree frog native to coastal eastern Australia.

== Description ==
This frog reaches 40 mm (1.6 in) in length. It is cream to red-brown on the back, with a darker band running down the middle. Males turn bright yellow in colour during the breeding season. A dark strip runs from the nostril to the shoulder, across the tympanum. The back of the legs are red and the thigh is yellow-orange. Some large black dots occur on the thigh and the backs of the legs. The belly is cream and the iris is golden.

== Distribution and habitat ==
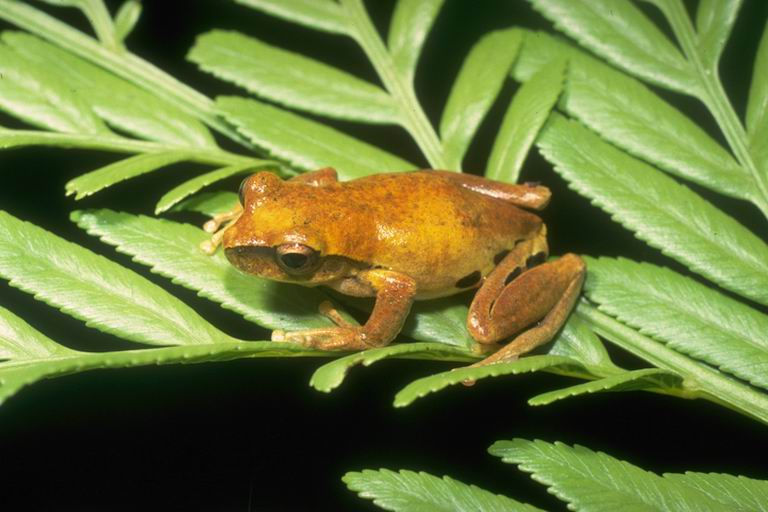

The revealed frog is found from south-eastern Queensland to the Central Coast of New South Wales. Older sources considered it, the Eungella whirring tree frog and the Atherton Tablelands whirring tree frog to be disjunct populations of a single species, but a 2025 study split the populations into three species.

== Ecology and behaviour ==
Males make a high-pitched whirring noise, similar to the whistling tree frog; calling occurs from spring to autumn, either from the ground or from vegetation bordering the breeding area.
