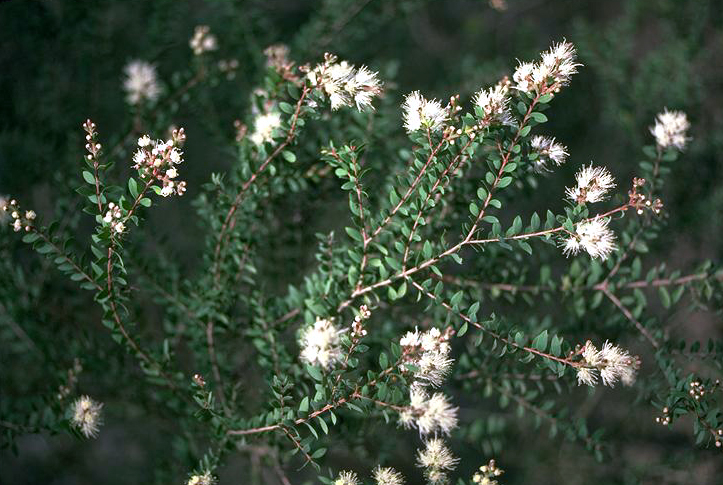

Scientific classification
- Kingdom: Plantae
- Clade: Tracheophytes
- Clade: Angiosperms
- Clade: Eudicots
- Clade: Rosids
- Order: Myrtales
- Family: Myrtaceae
- Genus: Melaleuca
- Species: M. cheelii

Binomial name
- Melaleuca cheelii C.T.White

= Melaleuca cheelii =

Species of shrub

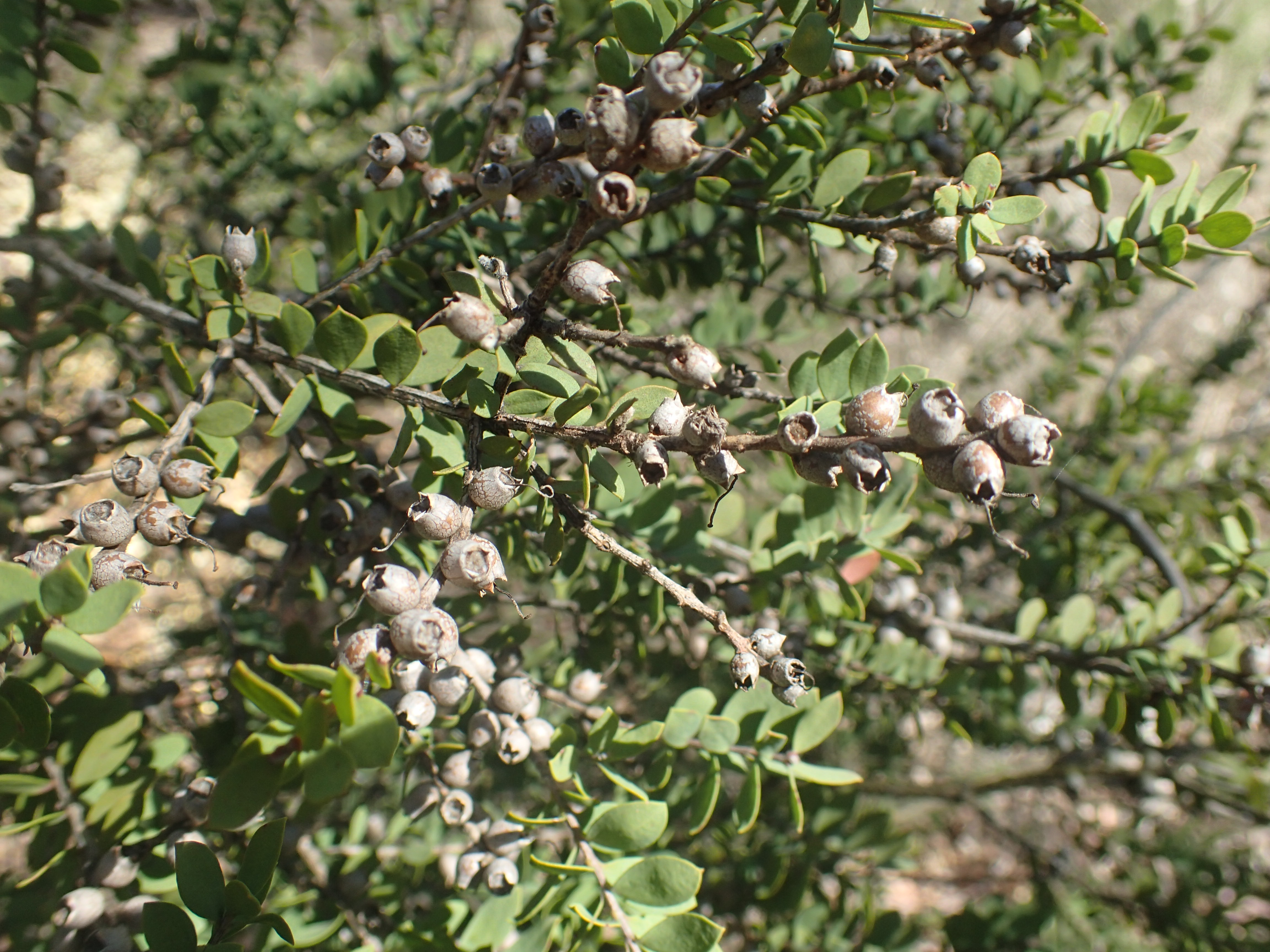
Foliage and fruit

Melaleuca cheelii is a plant in the myrtle family, Myrtaceae and is endemic to the Wide Bay–Burnett region of Queensland. It is a shrub or tree to 10 m (33 ft) with white flowers and papery bark. It has been classified as near threatened by the government of Queensland.

== Description ==
Melaleuca cheelii grows to a height of 8–10 m (26–33 ft). Its leaves are arranged in alternating opposite pairs (decussate), each leaf with an elliptic shape, 5–12.5 mm (0.2–0.5 in) long and 2–6 mm (0.08–0.2 in) wide.

The flowers are white to cream-coloured and arranged in spikes at the ends of the branches which continue to grow after flowering. The flower spikes are up to 40 mm (2 in) long and 20 mm (0.8 in) in diameter and carry 2 to 10 flowers. The petals are 2–2.7 mm (0.08–0.1 in) long and fall off after the flower has opened. The stamens are arranged in 5 bundles around the flower and each bundle has 8 to 18 stamens. The main flowering season is in September. After flowering, woody cup or barrel-shaped fruit develop in loose clusters, each fruit 4–4.5 mm (0.16–0.18 in) long.

== Taxonomy and naming ==
Melaleuca cheelii was first formally described in 1932 by Cyril Tenison White in Proceedings of the Royal Society of Queensland collected by White himself at "Traverston, mouth of the Burrum River, about 180 miles north of Brisbane, Queensland" noting that it was "common in wet places in sandy wallum country". The specific epithet (cheelii) honours Edwin Cheel (1872– 1951) who was a botanist at the state herbarium in Sydney.

== Distribution and habitat ==
This melaleuca occurs in wallum country near Bundaberg including in Burrum Coast National Park and the Meadowvale Nature Park in Bundaberg.

== Conservation status ==
This species has been classified as near threatened under the Government of Queensland Nature Conservation (Wildlife) Amendment Regulation (2010).

== Use in horticulture ==
Although not well known in cultivation, a specimen in the Australian National Botanic Gardens in Canberra is more than 20 years old. Others have grown successfully in Adelaide and Brisbane.
