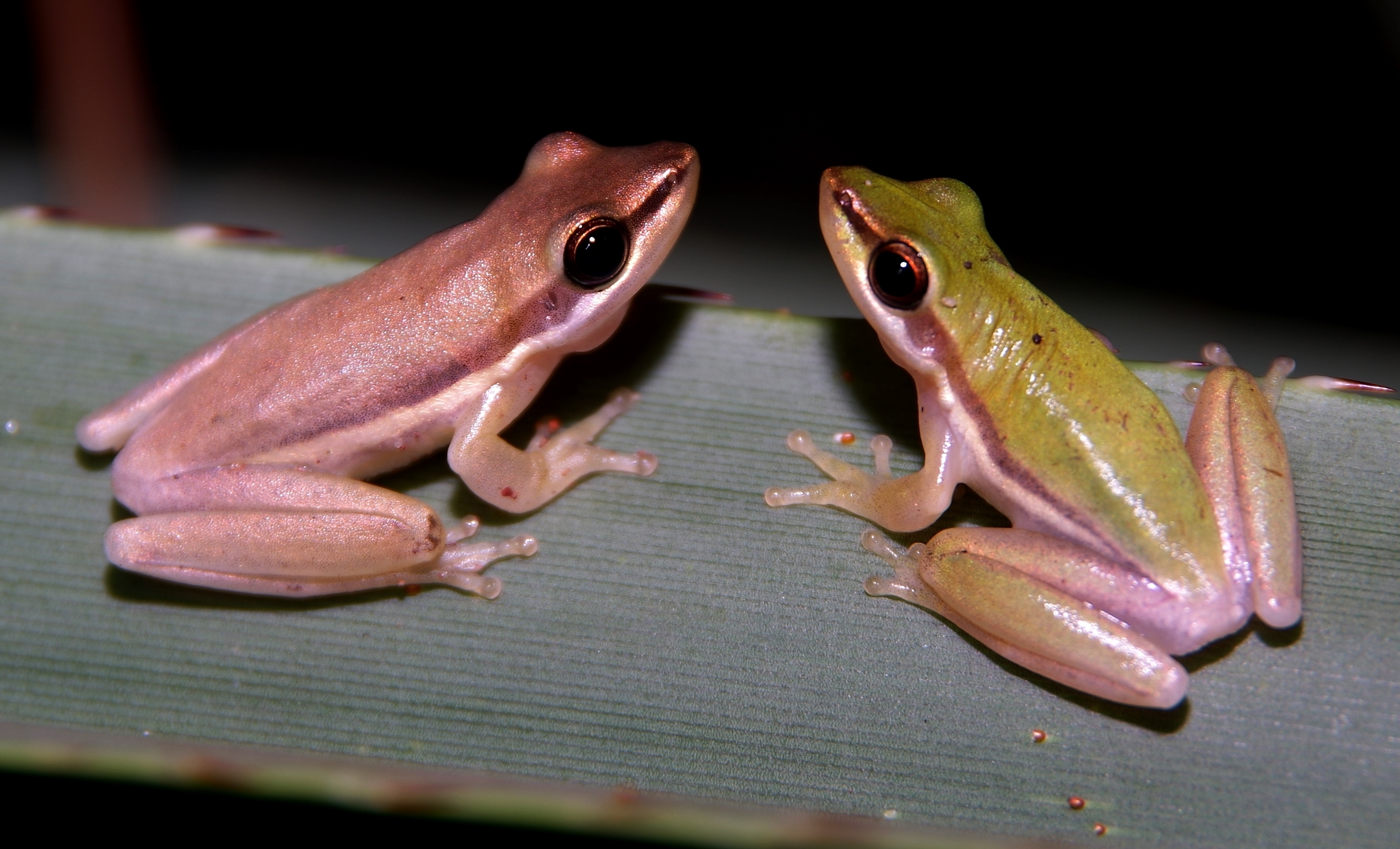
- Northern dwarf tree frogs at Fogg Dam, Northern Territory

Scientific classification
- Kingdom: Animalia
- Phylum: Chordata
- Class: Amphibia
- Order: Anura
- Family: Pelodryadidae
- Genus: Carichyla; Mahony, Donnellan, and Richards, 2025

Species
- Carichyla bicolor (Gray, 1842); Carichyla viranula (Menzies, Richards & Tyler, 2008)

= Carichyla =

Genus of amphibians

Carichyla is a genus of small tree frogs in the family Pelodryadidae, native to northern Australia and southern New Guinea. Species in the genus were previously included within the wastebasket genus Litoria, but were separated into a new genus in 2025. They are small green, brown or copper frogs that breed in permanent or ephemeral still water.

The genus is named from the Latin name of the sedge Carex for their affinity to inhabiting sedges within wetlands, and the first genus name for tree frogs Hyla (derived from the Greek Hylas).

Two species are recognized: the northern dwarf tree frog (Carichyla bicolor) in Australia and Carichyla viranula in New Guinea. Due to their similar appearance, Carichyla bicolor and Drymomantis fallax were long considered to be close relatives, but recent genetic analysis has found they diverged an estimated 17 million years ago, and that Carichyla is actually more closely related to many New Guinea species than to the Australian sedge frogs.
