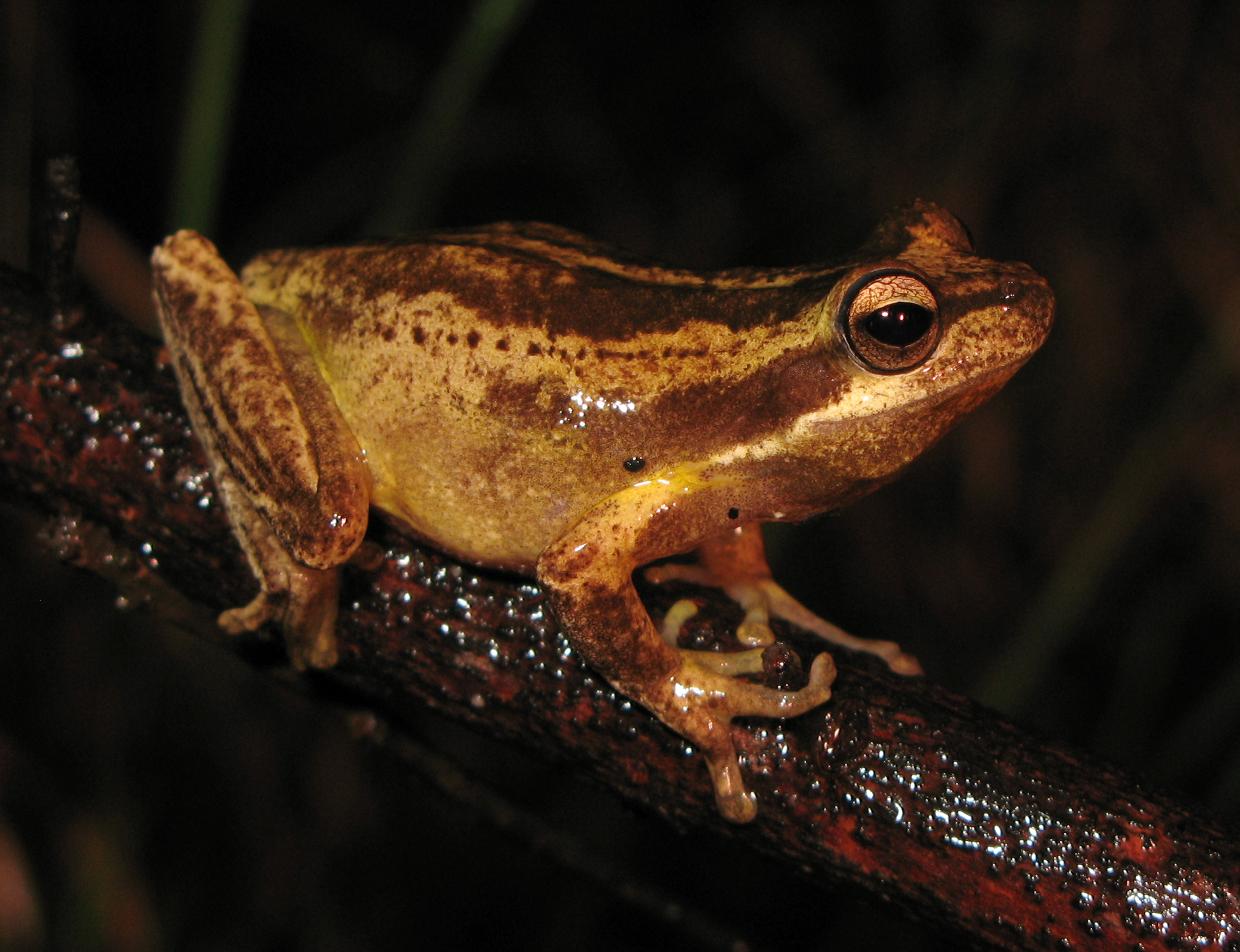
- Jervis Bay tree frog (Rawlinsonia jervisiensis) near Nelson Bay, New South Wales

Scientific classification
- Kingdom: Animalia
- Phylum: Chordata
- Class: Amphibia
- Order: Anura
- Family: Pelodryadidae
- Genus: Rawlinsonia; Wells and Wellington, 1985

Species
- See text

= Rawlinsonia =

Genus of amphibians

Rawlinsonia is a genus of tree frogs in the family Pelodryadidae. These frogs are native to eastern Australia. Species in the genus were previously included in the wastebasket genus Litoria, but were placed into the resurrected genus Rawlinsonia after a comprehensive phylogenetic study in 2025.

Species within Rawlinsonia range from small-to-large sized frogs that are usually grey to brown in colour, though some species exhibit green forms in parts of their range. Breeding males can also be slightly brighter in colour, sometimes becoming yellow or brick red. Unlike most Australian frogs, some species within this genus breed during colder months when most frogs are inactive.

== Species ==
Rawlinsonia contains 11 species:

Common name	Binomial name
South Australian tree frog	Rawlinsonia calliscelis (Peters, 1874)
Atherton Tablelands whirring tree frog	Rawlinsonia corbeni (Wells and Wellington, 1985)
Eungella whirring tree frog	Rawlinsonia eungellensis (Price, Hoskin, Mahony, and Donnellan, 2025)
Southern brown tree frog	Rawlinsonia ewingii (Duméril and Bibron, 1841)
Jervis Bay tree frog	Rawlinsonia jervisiensis (Duméril and Bibron, 1841)
Littlejohn's tree frog	Rawlinsonia littlejohni (White, Whitford, and Mahony, 1994)
Plains brown tree frog	Rawlinsonia paraewingi (Watson, Loftus-Hills, and Littlejohn, 1971)
Revealed frog	Rawlinsonia revelata (Ingram, Corben, and Hosmer, 1982)
Kangaroo Island tree frog	Rawlinsonia sibilus (Parkin, Rowley, Elliott-Tate, Mahony, Sumner, Melville, and Donnellan, 2024)
Whistling tree frog	Rawlinsonia verreauxii (Duméril, 1853)
Watson's tree frog	Rawlinsonia watsoni (Mahony, Moses, Mahony, Lemckert, and Donnellan, 2020)
