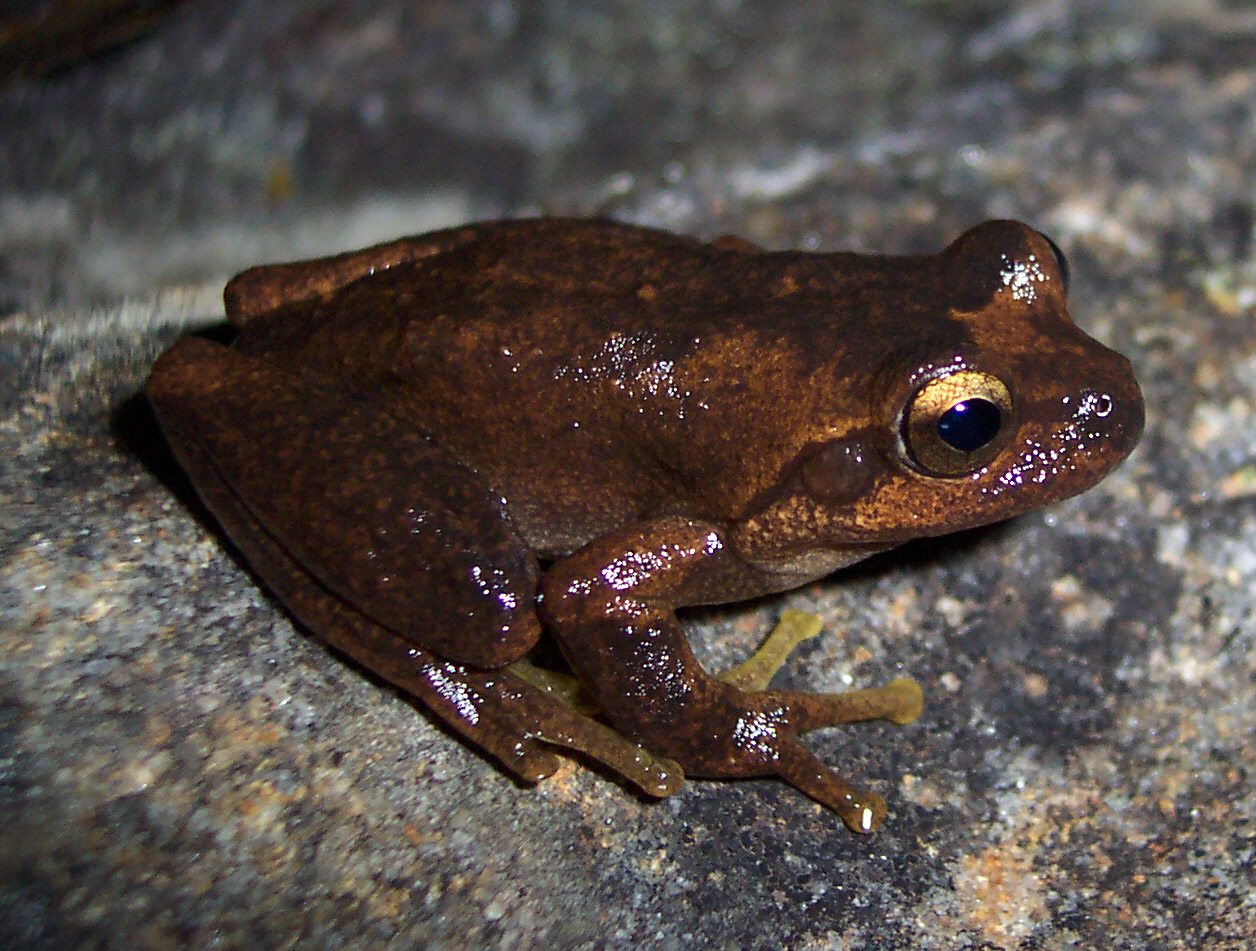

Conservation status
- Vulnerable (EPBC Act)

Scientific classification
- Kingdom: Animalia
- Phylum: Chordata
- Class: Amphibia
- Order: Anura
- Family: Pelodryadidae
- Genus: Rawlinsonia
- Species: R. littlejohni

Binomial name
- Rawlinsonia littlejohni (White, Whitford & Mahony, 1994)
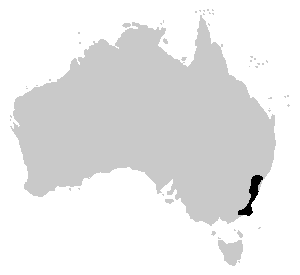
- Distribution of the Littlejohn's Tree Frog.

Synonyms
- Litoria littlejohni White, Whitford & Mahony, 1994

= Littlejohn's tree frog =

Species of amphibian

Littlejohn's tree frog (Rawlinsonia littlejohni), also called a heath frog or orange-bellied tree frog, is a species of tree frog native to eastern Australia from Wyong, New South Wales, to Buchan, Victoria.

== Taxonomy ==
In 2020, following a taxonomic review, the species was split, with the description of a new species Rawlinsonia watsoni encompassing the southernmost populations. The species was named in honour of Murray Littlejohn (1932–2024).

== Description ==
This is a medium-sized frog reaching 60 mm (2.4 in) in length. It is normally brown or grey-brown on the dorsal surface with many scattered darker flecks and spots. Often, a faint darker patch runs down the back. A dark line runs from behind the nostril down to the shoulder. The belly is cream. The iris is golden-yellow, and it has large toe discs. The armpits and thighs are orange, this helps distinguish it from the similar Jervis Bay tree frog (Rawlinsonia jervisiensis).

== Behaviour and ecology ==
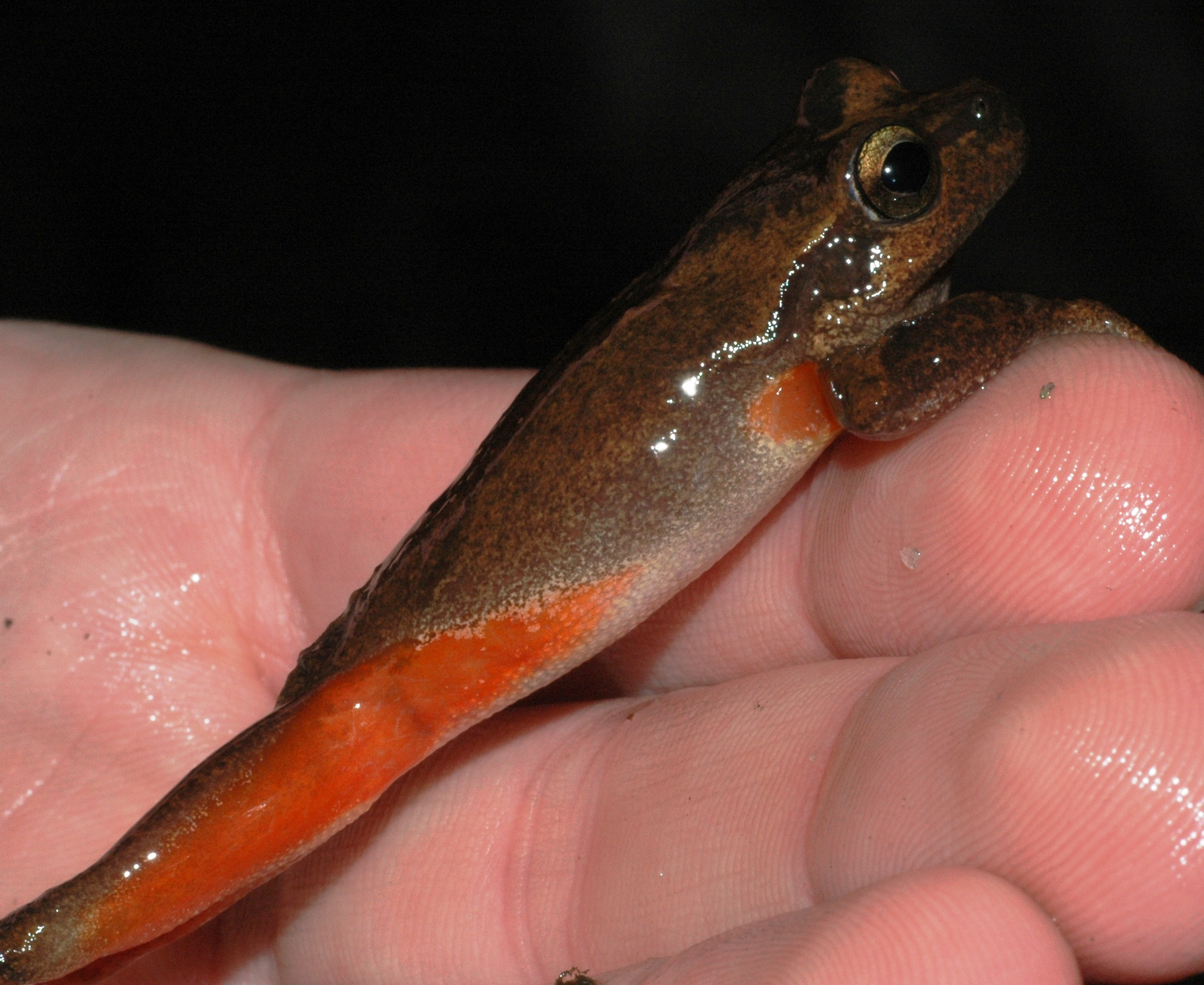
Litoria littlejohni showing orange colouration

This species is associated with swamps and dams, still creeks, and pools, mostly in heathland, but also in forest and woodland, mostly in highland areas. Males make a trilling "weep, weep, weep, weep..." from elevated areas or while floating in water around the breeding site. Males call mostly during the cooler months (April to September); however, calling has been observed in all months with a peak in February. Clusters of about 60 eggs are laid attached to submerged twigs or branches near the edge of the water body. Tadpoles are dark in colour, reaching about 65 mm and take about 120 days to develop. Metamorphs resemble the adult and measure around 20 mm.

This species of frog is one of the least encountered species in Australia. Despite a large distribution, the number of sites where this species has been recorded is low (total 75) across New South Wales and Victoria. At the majority of breeding sites, the number of calling males is also normally low (less than four) and has only rarely been recorded with more than 10 calling males, which is low for even rare species of frogs. This may be due to poor surveying techniques as a result of lack of data on the breeding habits and habitat preferences of this species.

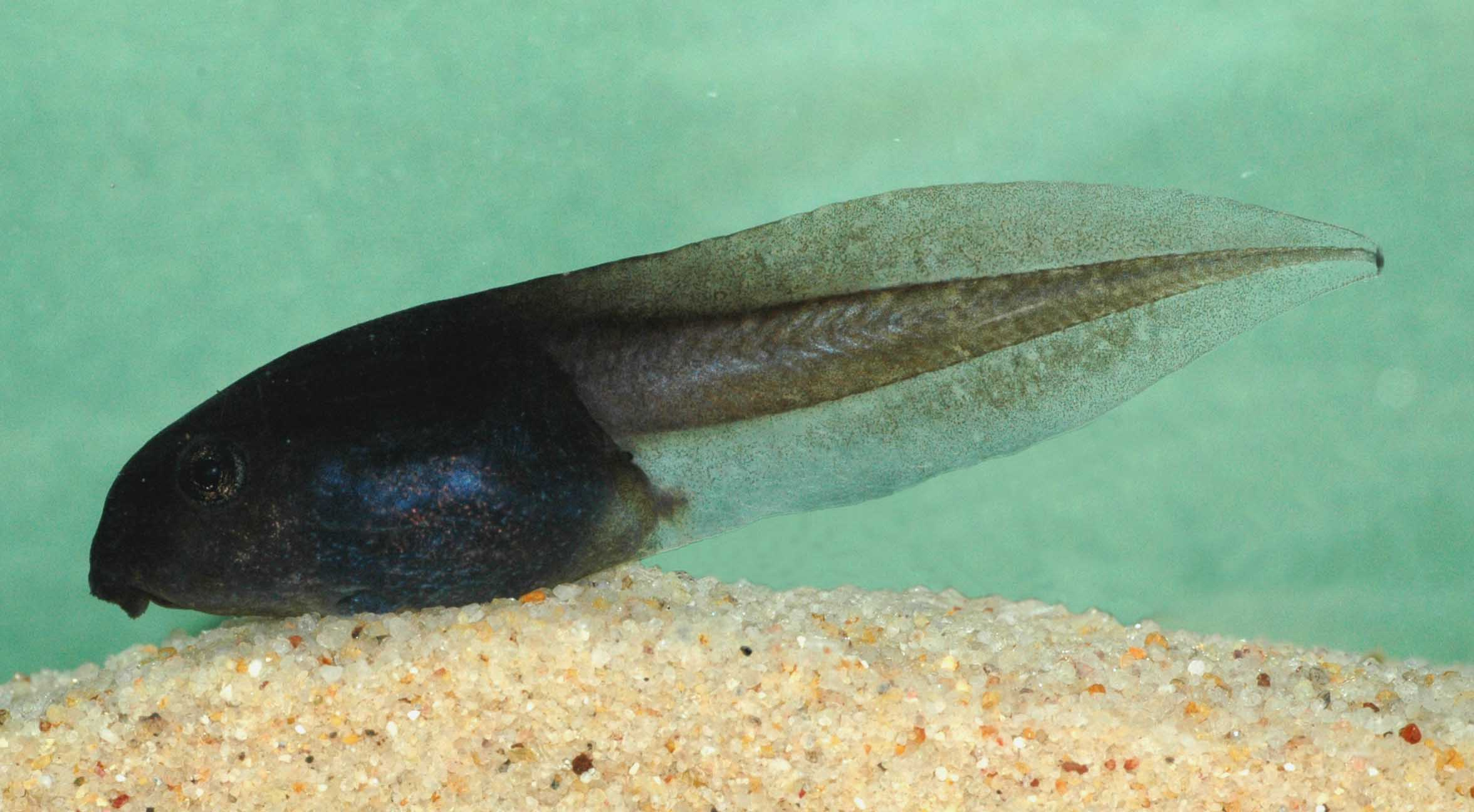
L. littlejohni tadpole

This species does not appear to be under direct threat from habitat clearing, and appears tolerant of disturbance. More research is required of this species to determine why low numbers of individuals are being recorded. However, despite the low numbers, they appear stable and this species does not appear to be in serious decline.

== As a pet ==
It is kept as a pet, and in Australia this animal may be kept in captivity with the appropriate permit.
