= Watson's tree frog =

Conservation status
- Endangered (EPBC Act)

Scientific classification
- Kingdom: Animalia
- Phylum: Chordata
- Class: Amphibia
- Order: Anura
- Family: Pelodryadidae
- Genus: Rawlinsonia
- Species: R. watsoni

Binomial name
- Rawlinsonia watsoni (Mahony, Moses, Mahony, Lemckert & Donnellan, 2020)

Synonyms
- Litoria watsoni Mahony, Moses, Mahony, Lemckert & Donnellan, 2020

Species of Australian frog

Watson's tree frog (Rawlinsonia watsoni), also known as the large brown tree frog or southern heath frog, is a species of tree frog endemic to south-eastern Australia.

== Taxonomy ==
Following a taxonomic review using a molecular genetics approach, in 2020 Watson's tree frog was split from Littlejohn's tree frog (R. littlejohni), with the southern populations assigned to the newly described species. The species epithet watsoni honours zoologist Dr Graeme Watson, formerly of the University of Melbourne, for his lifetime contributions to the study of frog biology.

== Description ==
The species is a medium-sized frog. With a snout-vent length (SVL) of up to 64 mm, the females are larger than the males (SVL = 59 mm). The back and outer surfaces of the limbs are light brown, flecked and mottled with darker brown and yellow. The underparts are white. There are distinctive red-orange makings on the backs of the legs, the feet, sides and groin. The head has a rounded snout with yellow eyes, distinct circular tympanums and black stripes extending from the snout through the eyes to the sides of the body. The legs are long and the feet largely unwebbed, with terminal discs on the fingers and toes.

The species is very similar to Littlejohn's tree frog; the main distinguishing characteristic is the breeding call of the males, with Watson's tree frog uttering fewer pulses in each note (with a mean of 22.8 per second as compared to 27.8) for a call length of 3–12 seconds. The call has been described as "wriiik wriiik wriik wriik".

== Distribution and habitat ==
The ranges of the two split species appear to be separated at the southern border of the Sydney Basin bioregion. The known range of L. watsoni extends from the Budderoo National Park and Barren Grounds Nature Reserve in the Shoalhaven River catchment of south-eastern New South Wales southwards to the eastern side of the Snowy River National Park in East Gippsland, Victoria, with an altitudinal range from near sea-level to 1,100 m. Distribution is very patchy, with few records from the southern part of the range. The topography of the northern end of the distribution range is characterised by steep cliffs and valleys, forming a biogeographic barrier which marks the geographic separation between Littlejohn's and Watson's tree frogs.

The species occurs in a variety of forest types, as well as woodland, bushland and heathland. It prefers moister sites, especially in or near tall moist forest. The most important habitat factor is the presence of pools that contain water long enough for tadpoles to complete metamorphosis. It has not been recorded from previously wooded land cleared for farming or plantation forestry.

== Conservation ==
The species’ population is suspected to be in decline. Threatening factors include habitat loss as well as bushfires, the incidence of which is likely to increase with climate change. The 2019–20 bushfires overlapped with about 85% of the species’ known range.

As of February 2022, the species is classified as endangered under the Environment Protection and Biodiversity Conservation Act 1999.
