= Atherton Tablelands whirring tree frog =

Scientific classification
- Kingdom: Animalia
- Phylum: Chordata
- Class: Amphibia
- Order: Anura
- Family: Pelodryadidae
- Genus: Rawlinsonia
- Species: R. corbeni

Binomial name
- Rawlinsonia corbeni Wells and Wellington, 1985
- Distributions of the three whirring tree frogs: R. corbeni in purple, R. eungellensis in blue and R. revelata in red.

Synonyms
- Litoria corbeni (Wells and Wellington, 1985)

Species of Australian frog

The Atherton Tablelands whirring tree frog (Rawlinsonia corbeni) is a species of frog that is endemic to north-eastern Queensland, Australia, where it is found on the Atherton Tableland and the Bellenden Ker Range. It is most closely related to the revealed frog (Rawlinsonia revelata) and the Eungella whirring tree frog (R. eungellensis).

The Atherton Tablelands whirring tree frog was initially named during the Wells and Wellington affair and was not recognised as a separate species by many sources, until a more comprehensive genetic analysis and phylogeny provided strong evidence for this species and the similar Eungella whirring tree frog.

The call of the northern Atherton Tablelands whirring tree frog is a high-pitched rapidly repeating note. This call, along with location, are the easiest ways to differentiate the Atherton species from other Rawlinsonia, as its call is the fastest and longest (counted by number of pulses) in the group: 18-33 pulses at 130 pulses per second.
