= Carichyla viranula =

Scientific classification
- Kingdom: Animalia
- Phylum: Chordata
- Class: Amphibia
- Order: Anura
- Family: Pelodryadidae
- Genus: Carichyla
- Species: C. viranula

Binomial name
- Carichyla viranula Menzies, Richards & Tyler, 2008

Synonyms
- Litoria viranula ()

Species of amphibian

Carichyla viranula is a species of frog in the family Pelodryadidae, endemic to New Guinea.

The male adult frog measures about 23.5 mm in snout-vent length and the female about 26.4 mm. Its head is longer than it is wide and its pupils are horizontal. The front feet usually have almost no webbing and the hind feet have lots of webbing. The skin of the dorsum is bright green and there is a bronze stripe on its back. It has darker patches on its legs and middle.

This frog lives in forests near the Digul River and Fly River. The female lays eggs in flowing water and in temporarily flooded environments.

The Latin name of this species viranula is a combination of viridis and ranula for green and frog.

== Original description ==
- J I Menzies; Stephen J Richards; Michael J Tyler (December 22, 2008). "Systematics of the Australo-Papuan tree frogs known as Litoria bicolor (Anura: Hylidae) in the Papuan region". Australian Journal of Zoology (Abstract). 56 (4): 257. doi:10.1071/ZO07068.
