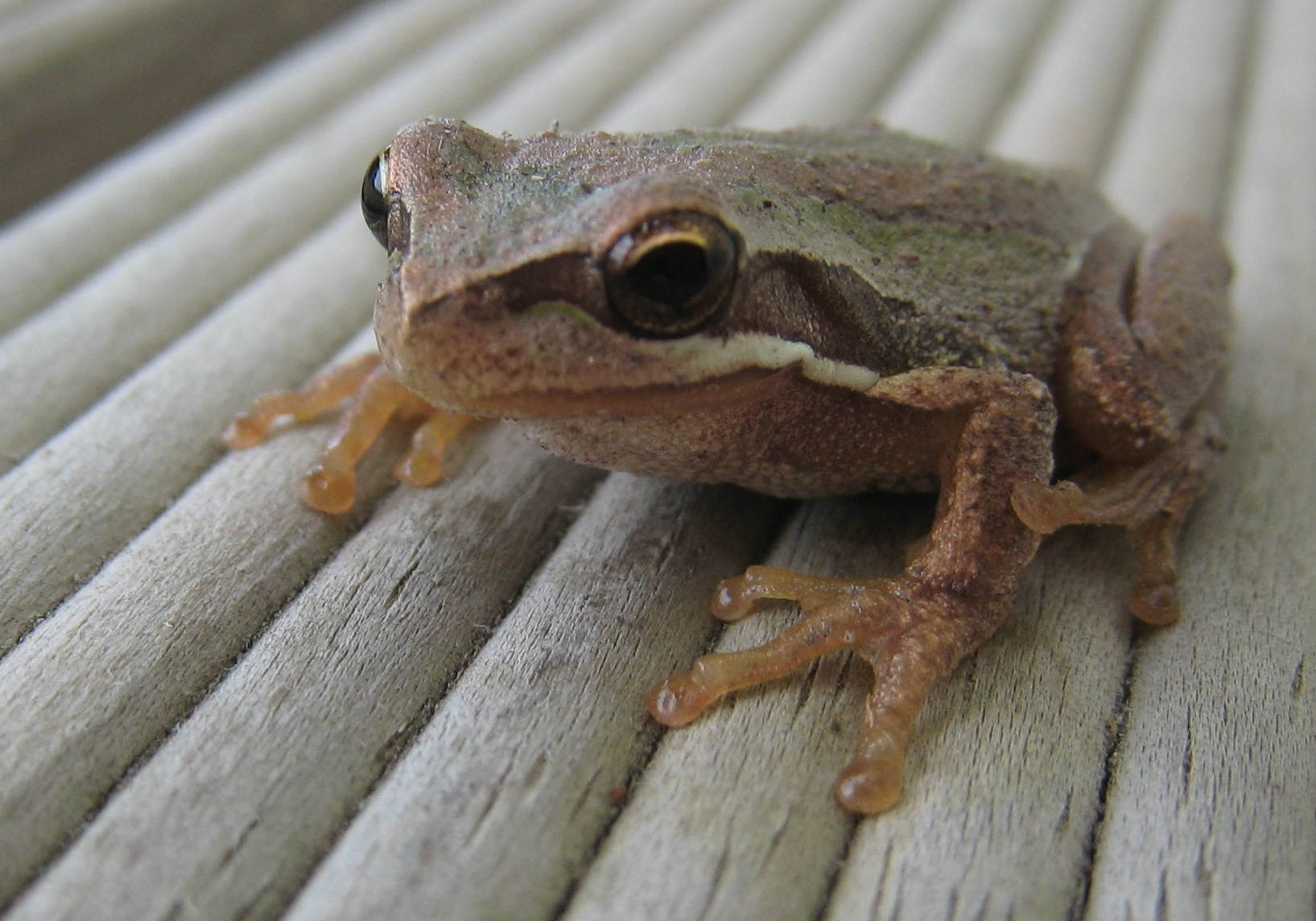
- Litoria ewingii

Conservation status
- Least Concern (IUCN 3.1)

Scientific classification
- Kingdom: Animalia
- Phylum: Chordata
- Class: Amphibia
- Order: Anura
- Family: Pelodryadidae
- Genus: Rawlinsonia
- Species: R. paraewingi

Binomial name
- Rawlinsonia paraewingi (Watson, Loftus-Hills & Littlejohn, 1971)

Synonyms
- Litoria paraewingi Watson, Loftus-Hills & Littlejohn, 1971

= Plains brown tree frog =

Species of amphibian

The plains brown tree frog or Victorian frog (Rawlinsonia paraewingi) is a species of frog in the subfamily Pelodryadinae. It is endemic to Australia. Its natural habitats are subtropical or tropical dry forests, rivers, freshwater lakes, freshwater marshes, water storage areas, ponds, and canals and ditches.
