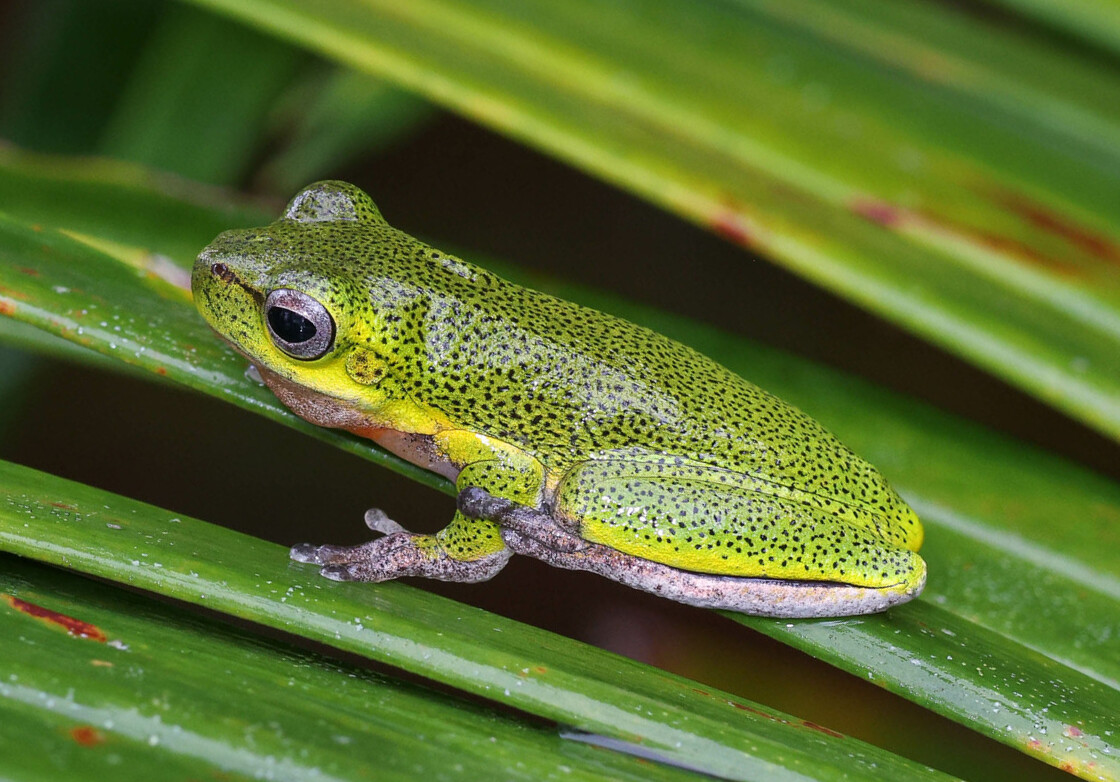

Conservation status
- Near Threatened (IUCN 3.1)

Scientific classification
- Kingdom: Animalia
- Phylum: Chordata
- Class: Amphibia
- Order: Anura
- Family: Pelodryadidae
- Genus: Drymomantis
- Species: D. cooloolensis

Binomial name
- Drymomantis cooloolensis Liem, 1974

Synonyms
- Litoria cooloolensis — Liem, 1974

= Cooloola sedge frog =

Species of frog

The Cooloola sedge frog or Cooloola tree frog (Drymomantis cooloolensis) is a species of frog in the subfamily Pelodryadinae.

It is endemic to Australia and only known from Fraser and North Stradbroke Islands, off south-eastern Queensland.

== Habitat ==
It inhabits sandy coastal and island freshwater lakes and wallum creeks, with a preference for dense reed beds. It is threatened by water extraction and pollution and by tramping of the reef beds. It occurs in the Great Sandy National Park.

== Ecology and Behaviour ==
The Cooloola sedge frog breeds during spring and summer, with males calling above and near lentic waterbodies. Males appear to exhibit territorial behaviours where they have been observed, whilst calling, to wave their legs at each other before wrestling.

== Description ==
This amphibian's back is yellowish green, speckled with dark spots, and the hidden surfaces of its thighs are orange with a purple-brown stripe. The belly is grainy and white in color.
