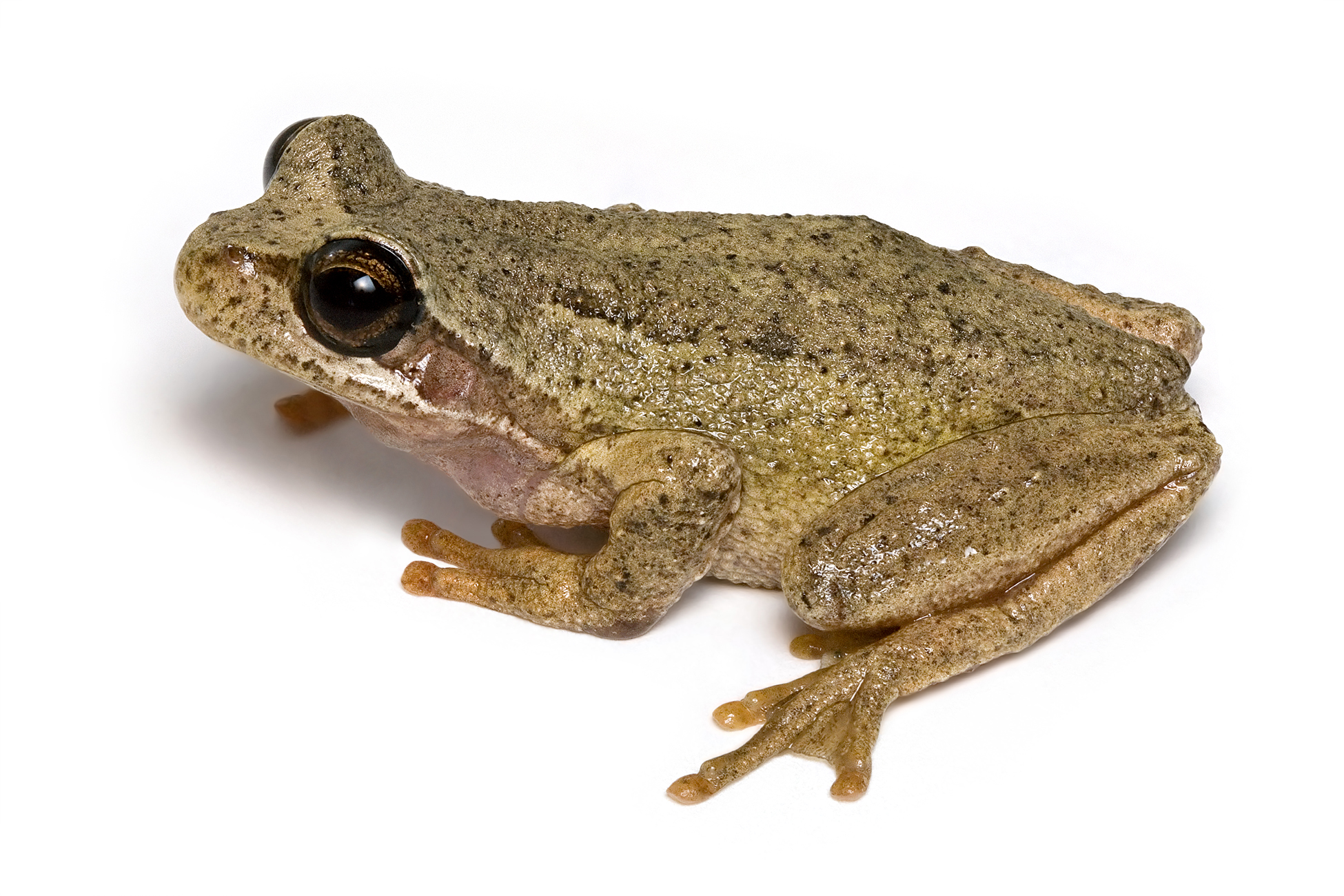

Conservation status
- Least Concern (IUCN 3.1)

Scientific classification
- Kingdom: Animalia
- Phylum: Chordata
- Class: Amphibia
- Order: Anura
- Family: Pelodryadidae
- Genus: Rawlinsonia
- Species: R. ewingii

Binomial name
- Rawlinsonia ewingii (Duméril & Bibron, 1841)
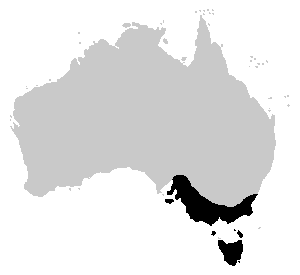
- Native distribution of the southern brown tree frog

Synonyms
- Litoria ewingii ([Duméril & Bibron, 1841)

= Southern brown tree frog =

Species of amphibian

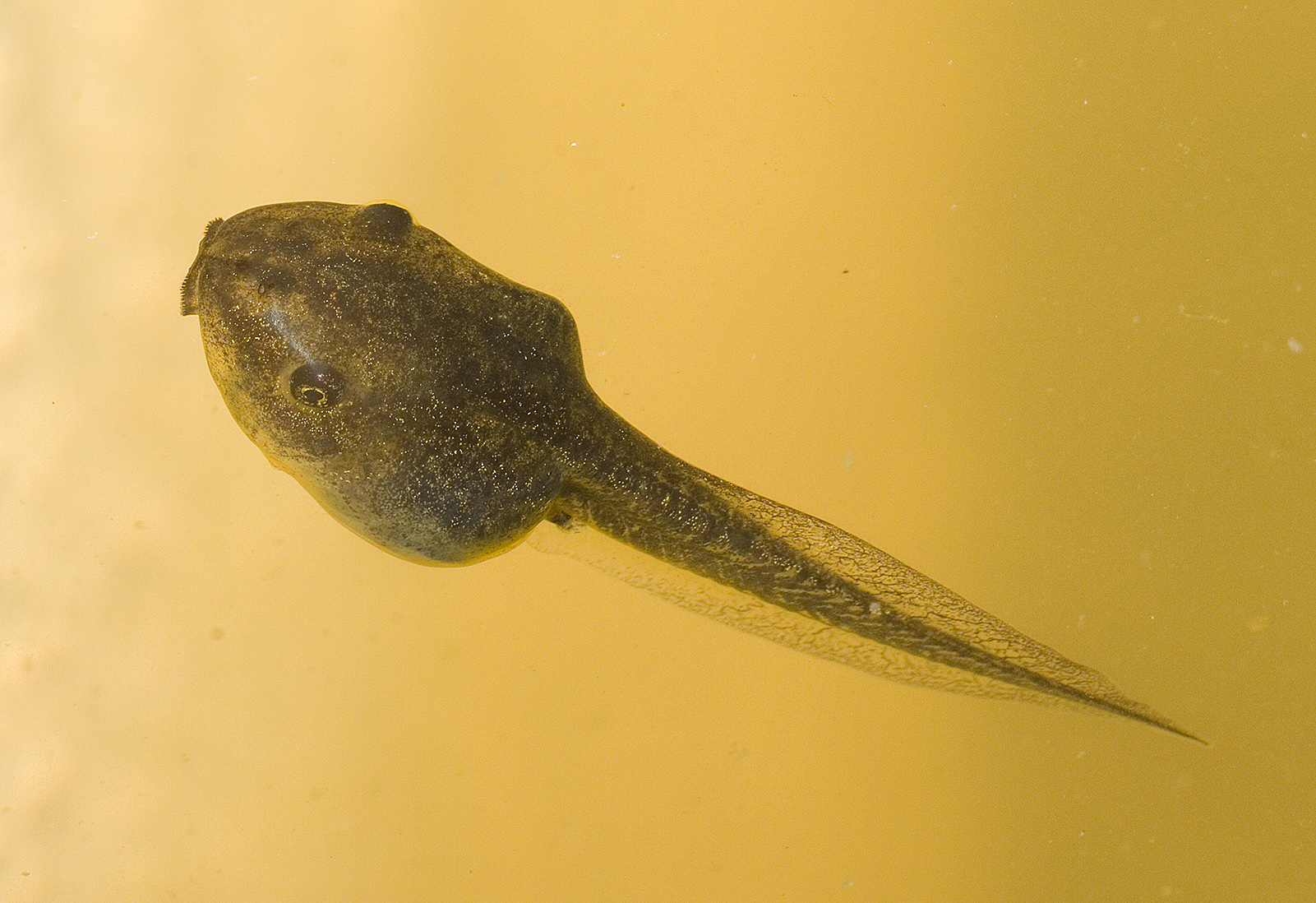
Tadpole

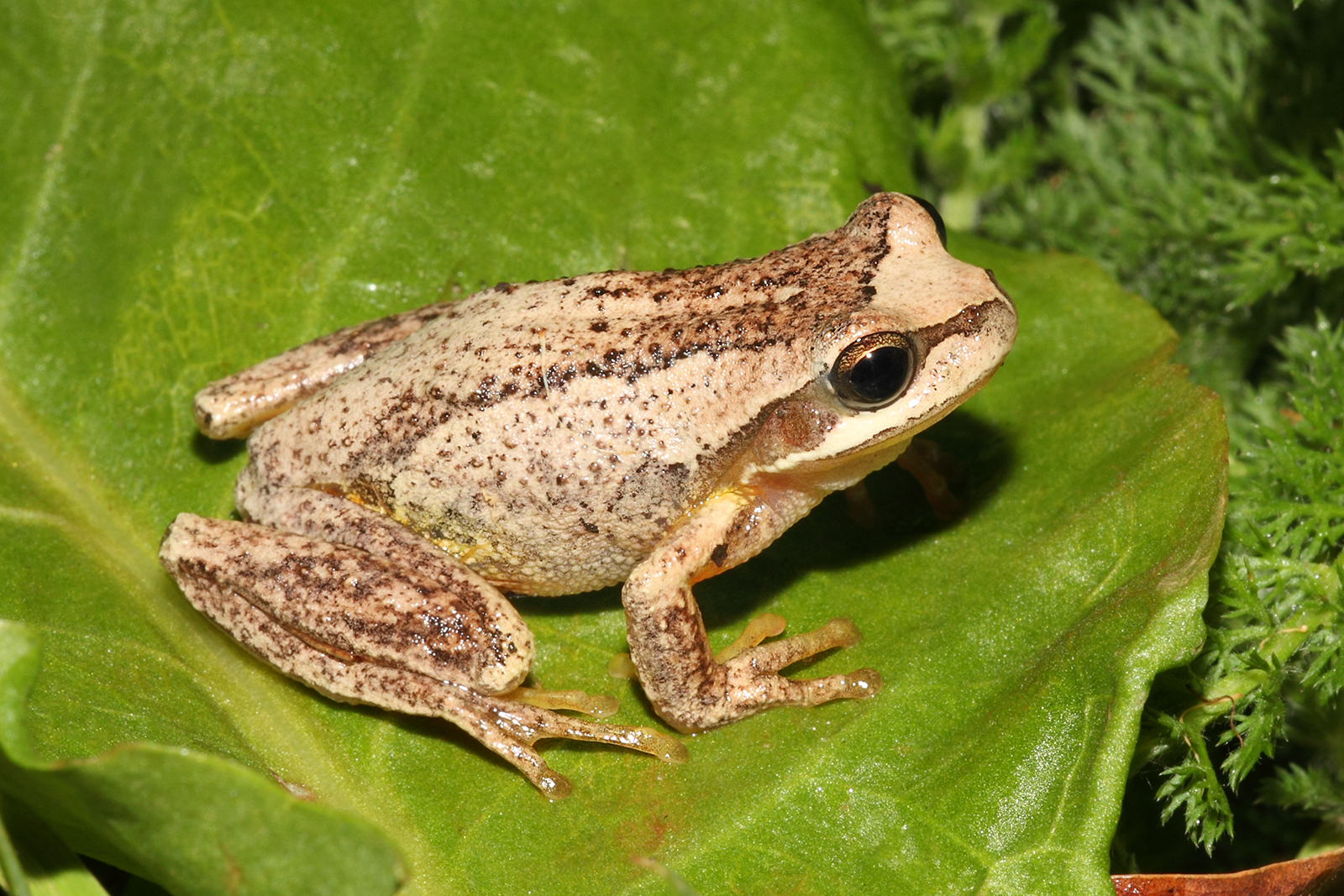
In eastern Victoria

The southern brown tree frog (Rawlinsonia ewingii), also known as the brown tree frog, whistling tree frog, or Ewing's tree frog, is a species of tree frog native to Australia: most of southern Victoria, eastern South Australia, southern New South Wales from about Ulladulla—although the species is reported to occur further north—and throughout Tasmania, including the Bass Strait Islands, in which state it is the most frequently encountered frog. It has been introduced to New Zealand, where it can be locally abundant.

== Taxonomy ==
The southern brown tree frog was described in 1841 by French naturalists André Duméril and Gabriel Bibron.

== Evolution ==
R. ewingi is one of the classic examples of speciation by reinforcement. Future research into congener hybridisation and gene flow may find such occurring, and may find countervailing reinforcement mechanisms at work.

== Description ==
This species reaches 45 millimetres (1.8 in) in length. It is pale to dark brown on the dorsal surface, with a broad darker patch starting at the eyes and covering the majority of the back, although pure green and green striped colour morphs are also common. A dark band starting at the nostril runs across the eye and tympanum to the shoulder, and a pale white stripe below this runs from the mouth to the arm. The backs of the thighs are orange, and no black marbling is present (except specimens from the Adelaide region), distinguishing this species from the similar whistling tree frog, (Rawlinsonia verreauxii). Some specimens from western Victoria and south eastern South Australia can be partially or entirely green. The belly is cream.

== Ecology and behavior ==
Male southern brown tree frogs calling

This species is found in a wide range of habitats, including forests, farmland, heathland, semiarid areas, alpine regions, and suburban areas. They are particularly common in parts of suburban Adelaide, Melbourne, and Hobart, where they are often observed upon window panes at night, attracted by flying insects. Males make a whistling weep-weep-weep call from beside or floating in the water of, dam impoundments, ditches, ponds, and stream-side pools. Males call all year round, particularly after rain. Eggs are easily identifiable, being wound around submerged grass stems, aquatic vegetation, and sticks. These frogs can freeze and survive although freezing is likely costly for the species.

== Distribution ==
The species is native to south-eastern Australia, found in South Australia, Victoria, New South Wales and Tasmania. It was introduced to Greymouth on the West Coast of New Zealand in 1875, and has since become widely established in the North Island, South Island and Chatham Islands.

== As a pet ==
In Australia, this animal may be kept without any wildlife license when purchased from a breeder. Rawlinsonia ewingi does not require any UV supplementation, it simply requires a light cycle and a small water source as it is an arboreal species. However, this species is commonly active during daylight hours, despite being considered primarily nocturnal and crepuscular. Therefore, UV supplementation will likely contribute to providing a quality habitat and healthier, happier frogs.
