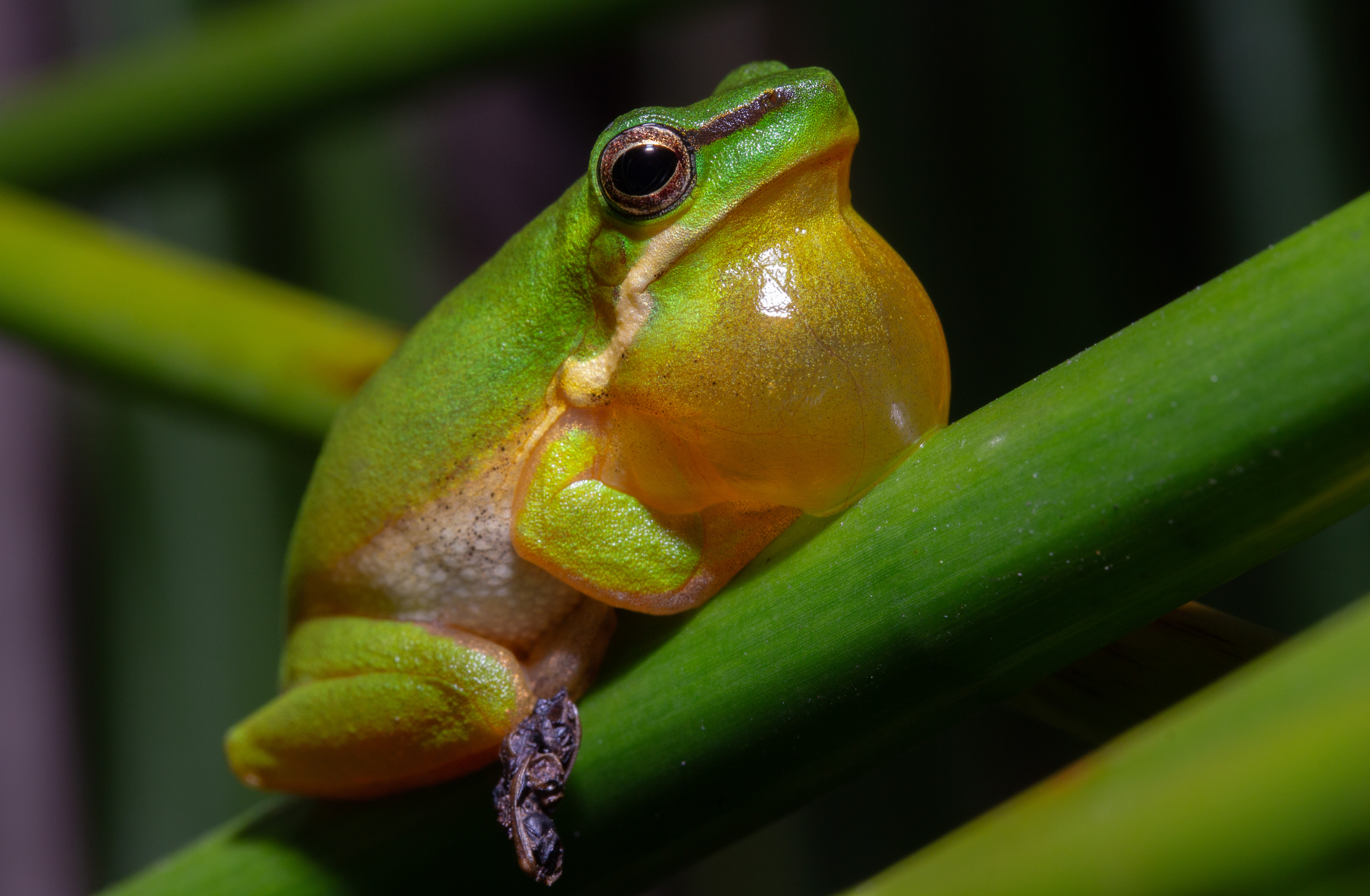
- Eastern dwarf tree frog in Sydney Olympic Park, Australia

Scientific classification
- Kingdom: Animalia
- Phylum: Chordata
- Class: Amphibia
- Order: Anura
- Family: Pelodryadidae
- Genus: Drymomantis; Peters, 1882

Species
- Drymomantis cooloolensis (Liem, 1974); Drymomantis fallax (Peters, 1880); Drymomantis olongburensis (Liem and Ingram, 1977)

= Drymomantis =

Genus of amphibians

Drymomantis is a genus of small tree frogs in the family Pelodryadidae, native to eastern Australia. Species in the genus were previously included within the wastebasket genus Litoria, but were separated into a new genus in 2025. They are small green frogs, some with black flecks on the dorsum, that breed in permanent or ephemeral still water.

The genus is thought to be named from the Greek drymos for forest and mantis, the Greek name of the European tree frog.

Three species are recognized: the Wallum sedge frog (Drymomantis olongburensis, Liem & Ingram, 1977), Eastern dwarf tree frog (Drymomantis fallax, Peters, 1880), and Cooloola sedge frog (Drymomantis cooloolensis, Liem, 1974).
