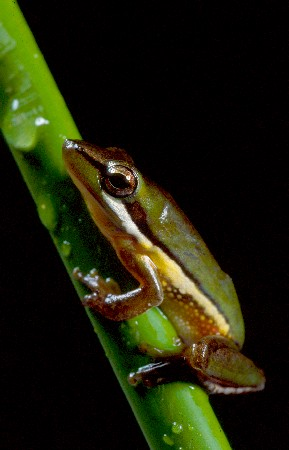

Conservation status
- Vulnerable (IUCN 3.1)

Scientific classification
- Kingdom: Animalia
- Phylum: Chordata
- Class: Amphibia
- Order: Anura
- Family: Pelodryadidae
- Genus: Drymomantis
- Species: D. olongburensis

Binomial name
- Drymomantis olongburensis Liem & Ingram, 1977

= Wallum sedge frog =

Species of amphibian

The wallum sedge frog (Drymomantis olongburensis), also known as the Olongburra frog or the sharp-snouted reed frog, is a species of frog that is endemic to Australia. Varying in color from brown to dark green it inhabits the thick and often acidic marshes of the Wallum along the coast of Queensland and New South Wales. Mating season comes in early spring, often after heavy rainfalls. Females attach their eggs to grasses and sedges. Their call is high pitched and follows a "creeeek... crik" pattern.

Its natural habitats are subtropical or tropical swamps, wallum swamps, freshwater lakes, intermittent freshwater lakes, freshwater marshes, and intermittent freshwater marshes.

The species is considered vulnerable with there being about 10,000–50,000 such frogs in the wild. Despite conservation efforts, the population continues to decrease. Loss of habitat, invasive plants, and disease (most notably chytrid fungus) are contributing to the loss of population.
