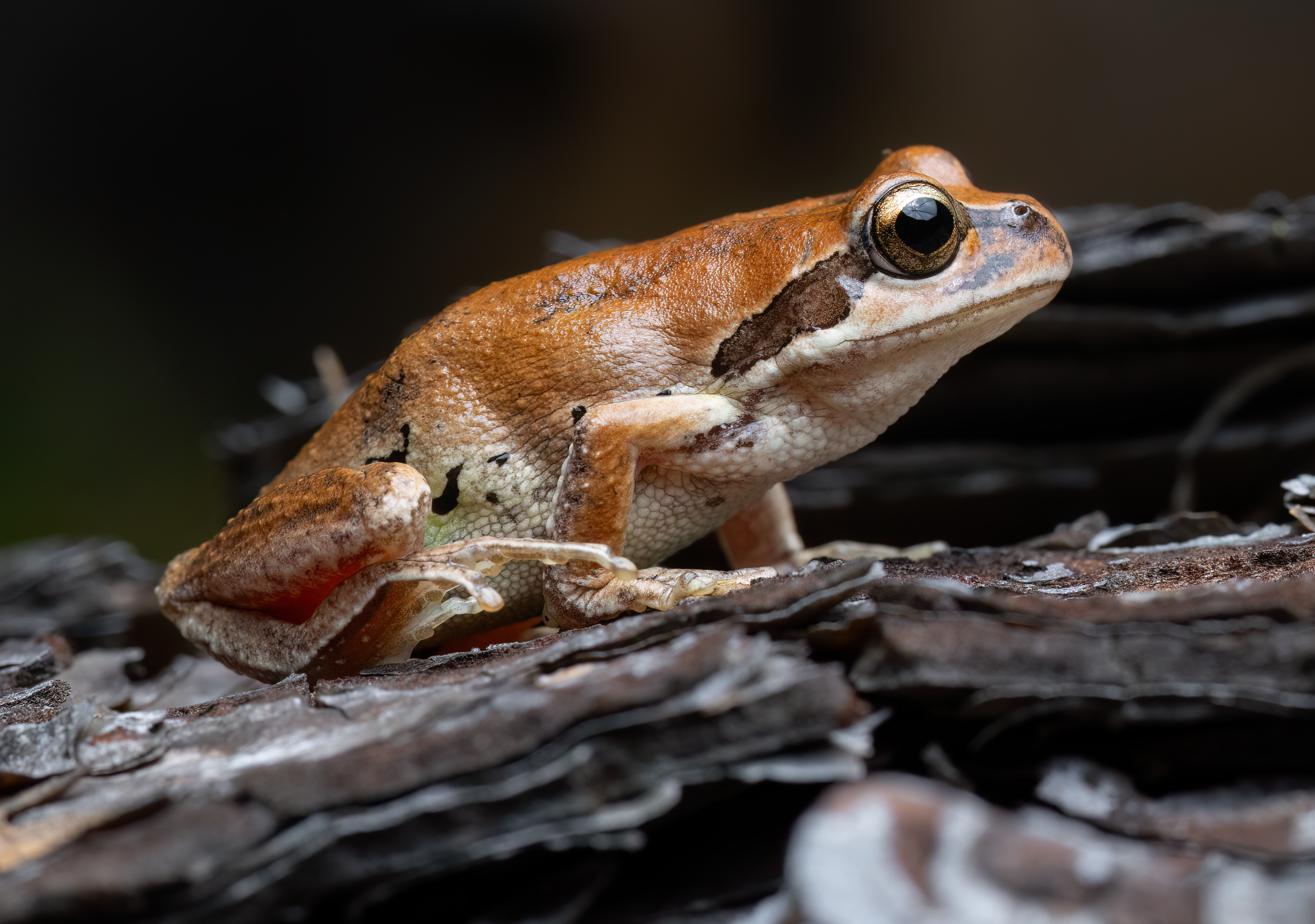

Conservation status
- Least Concern (IUCN 3.1)

Scientific classification
- Kingdom: Animalia
- Phylum: Chordata
- Class: Amphibia
- Order: Anura
- Family: Pelodryadidae
- Genus: Rawlinsonia
- Species: R. verreauxii

Binomial name
- Rawlinsonia verreauxii (Auguste Duméril, 1853)

Subspecies
- Rawlinsonia verreauxii alpina (Fry, 1915); Rawlinsonia verreauxii verreauxii (Duméril, 1853)
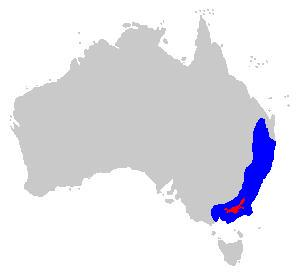
- Range of Verreaux's tree frog: Rawlinsonia verreauxii verreauxii in blue, Rawlinsonia verreauxii alpina in red

Synonyms
- Hyla verreauxii Duméril, 1853; Litoria verreauxii (Duméril, 1853)

= Whistling tree frog =

Species of amphibian

The whistling tree frog (Rawlinsonia verreauxii), or Verreaux's tree frog, is a species of frog found in Australia. It has been divided into two subspecies, the nominate Verreaux's tree frog (R. v. verreauxii) and the Verreaux's alpine tree frog (R. v. alpina). The alpine tree frog is restricted to the southern alps of New South Wales and Victoria. Verreaux's tree frog is widespread throughout south-eastern Queensland, coastal and highland regions of New South Wales, and south-eastern Victoria.

== Conservation status ==
Rawlinsonia verreauxii verreauxii is widespread and common across eastern Australia. R. v. alpina, though, has a very restricted range and has suffered significant declines in population; it is currently listed as endangered.

== Evolution ==
The whistling tree frog is one of the classic examples of speciation by reinforcement. Future research into congener hybridisation and gene flow may find such occurring, and may find countervailing reinforcement mechanisms at work.

== Description ==
R. v. verreauxii is light brown to red brown above, with an often indistinct, broad, darker patch starting between the eyes and continuing over the back. A dark band starting at the nostril runs across the eye and down to the shoulder, underlined by a white line starting at the mouth. The thighs and backs of the legs are red with small black spots, with some larger black spots present on the fronts of the thighs.

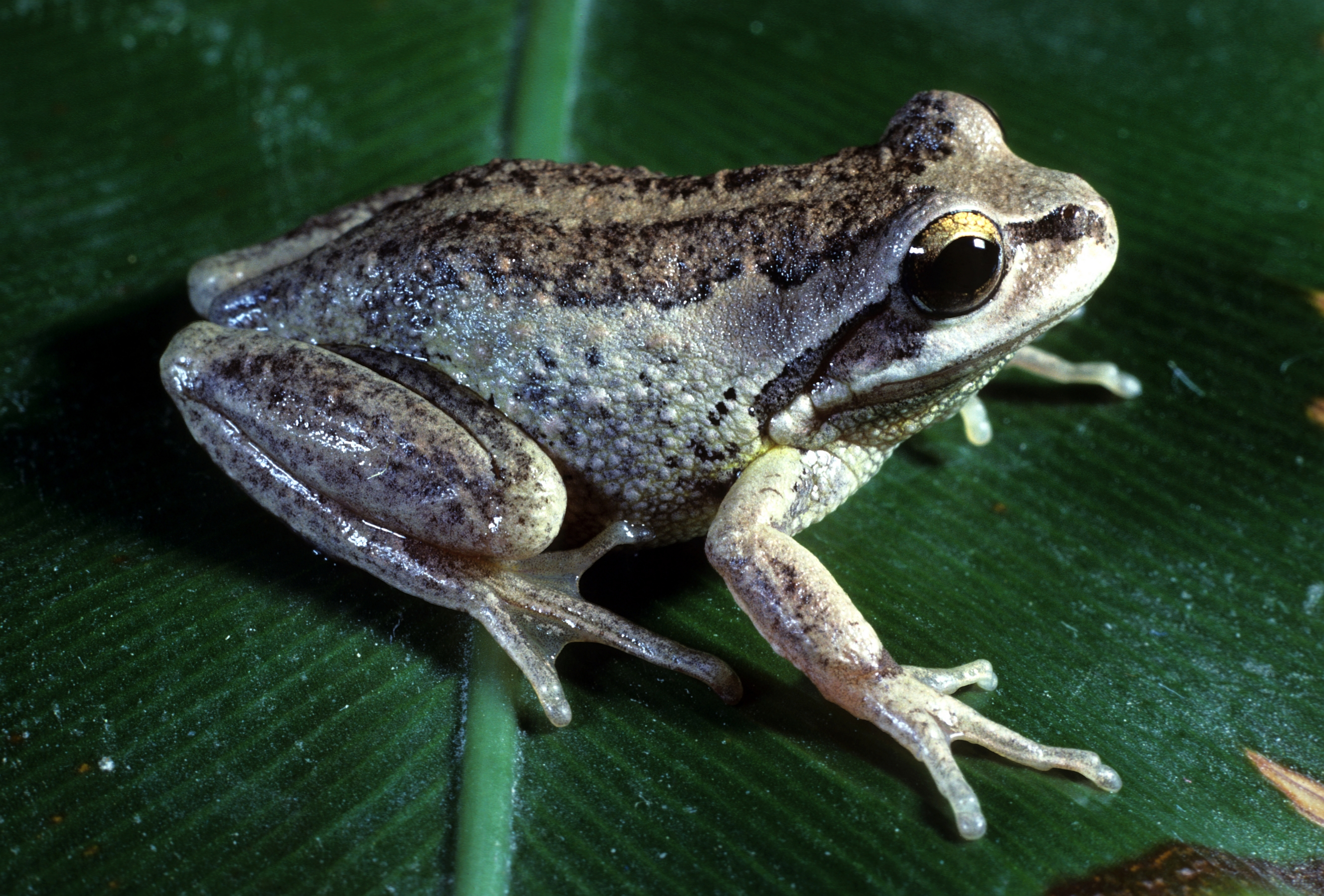
R. v. alpina

R. v. alpina is mostly green on the dorsal surface with two brown bands running parallel to each other down the back. These bands start at the eye and are separated by a narrow band of green. The thighs and backs of the legs are the same as above. The belly of both subspecies is white. Both reach a maximum size of about 35 mm (1.4 in).

== Ecology and behaviour ==
Verreaux's tree frog inhabits swamps, dam impoundments, and creeks in woodland, farmland, forest and cleared land. Males call from pond-side vegetation or from the ground all year round, but calling intensifies during autumn and spring and after rain. As its name implies, this frog makes a whistling noise.

The alpine tree frog inhabits alpine ponds and pools of creeks in moorland, alpine forest and partly cleared land. Males have a similar call as above and call from beside the breeding sites during spring and summer.

Chytrid fungus is believed to be partly responsible for the decline of the alpine subspecies.

== As a pet ==
It is kept as a pet; in Australia and New Zealand, this animal may be kept in captivity with the appropriate permit.
