= Wallum =

Australian ecosystem

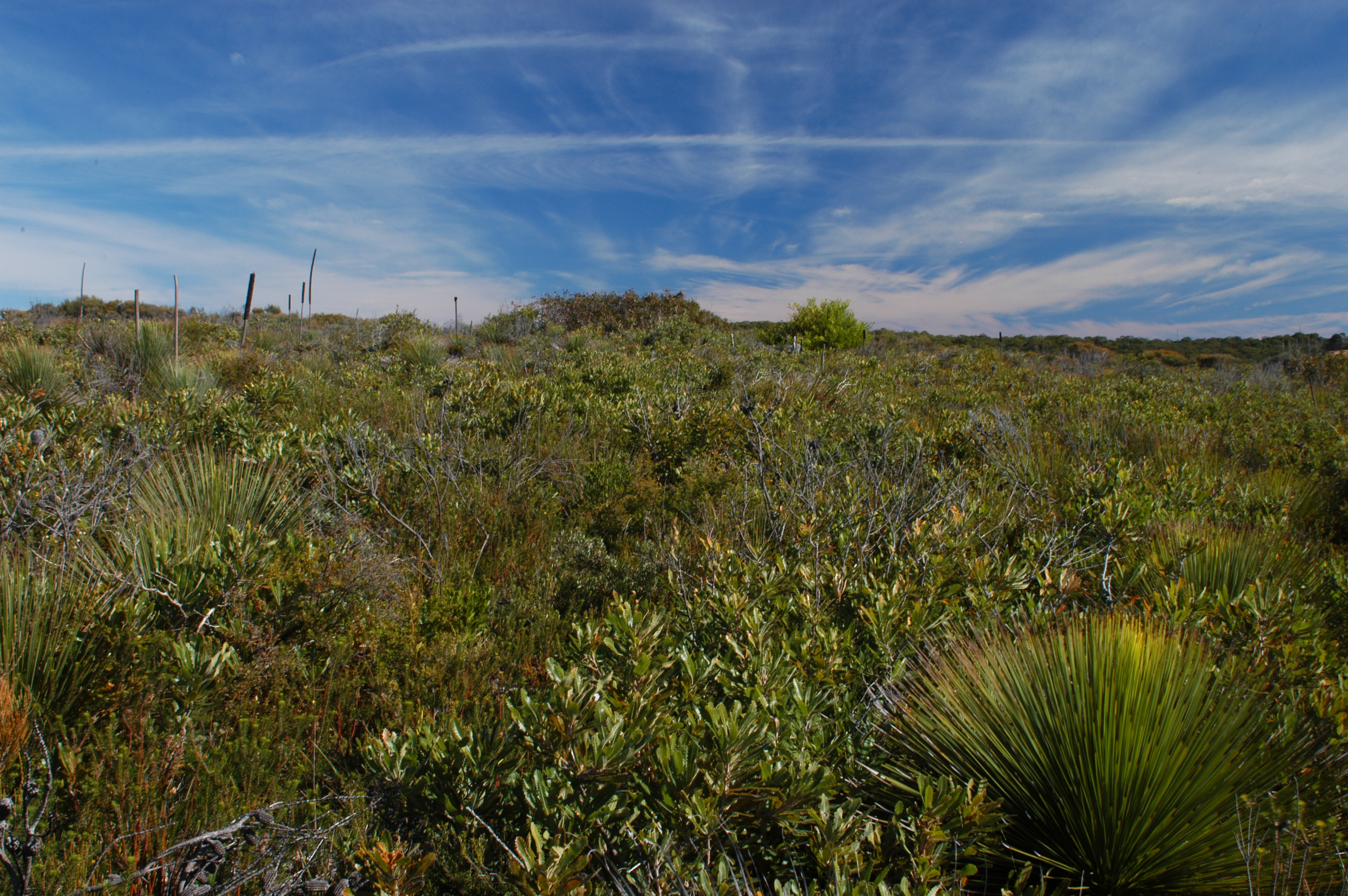
Wallum heathland

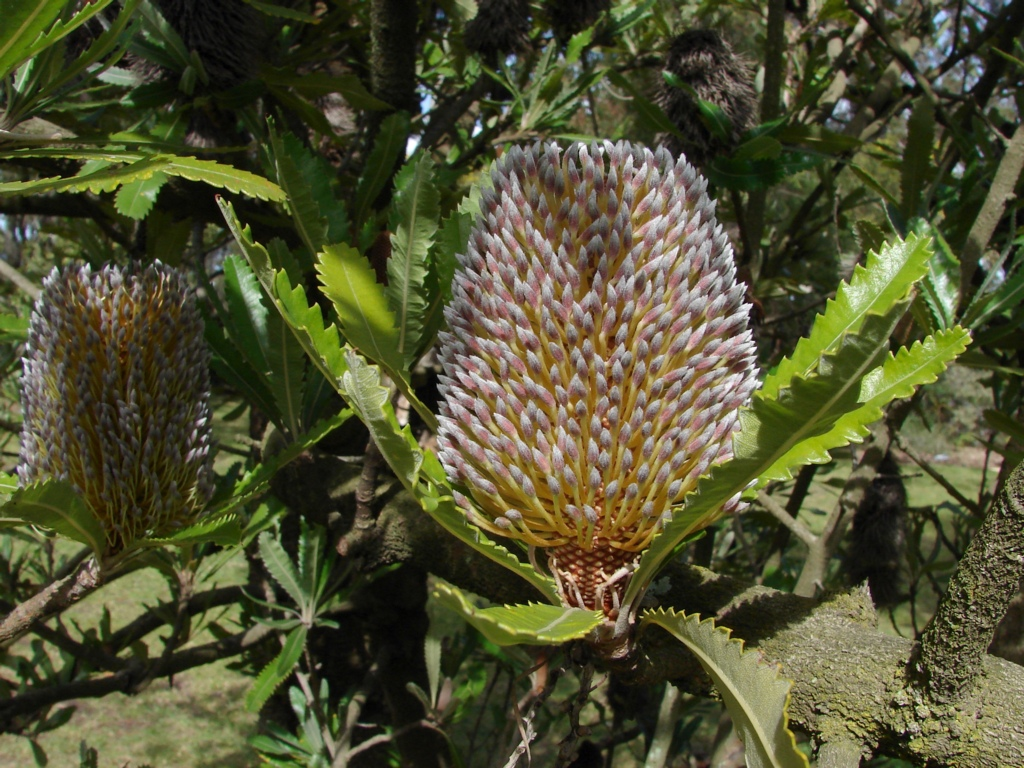
Wallum banksia, Banksia aemula

Wallum, also known as the Wallum Sand Heaths or Wallum Country, is an Australian ecosystem of coastal south-eastern Queensland, extending into north-eastern New South Wales. It is characterised by flora-rich shrubland and heathland on deep, nutrient-poor, acidic, sandy soils, and regular wildfire. Seasonal changes in the water table due to rainfall may create swamps.

The name Wallum is derived from the Kabi word for the wallum banksia.

== Threats ==
Wallum, as with other coastal ecosystems, is highly threatened by the pressure for coastal development. Threats include clearing of land for residential development and pine plantations, alterations to drainage from adjacent developments, nutrients from fertilizers, changes in fire frequency, pollution from mosquito control sprays, and the introduction of weeds.

Species endemic to Wallum include some acid frogs – frogs adapted to living and breeding in acidic waters – such as the wallum froglet, Freycinet's frog, and the wallum sedge frog. In Queensland, the eastern ground parrot appears to be largely restricted to the wallum.

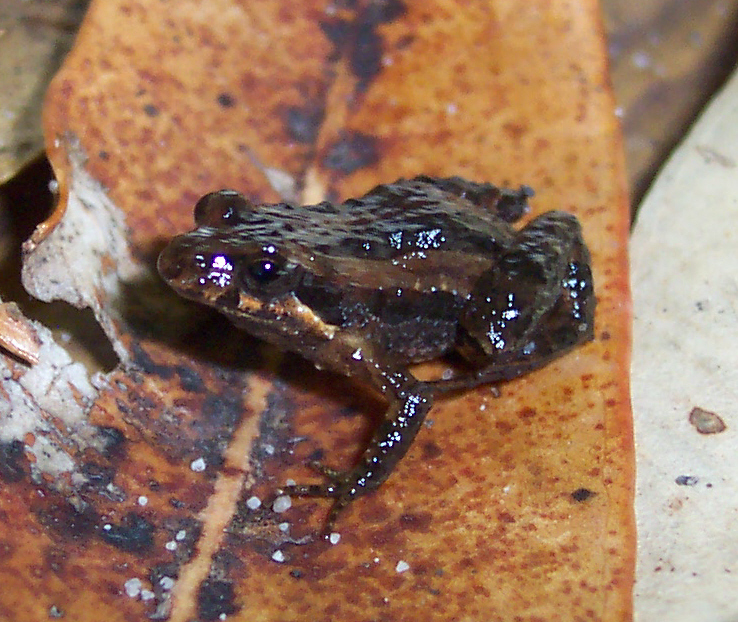
Wallum froglet (Crinia tinnula)
