= Peppered tree frog =

Conservation status
- Data Deficient (IUCN 3.1)

Scientific classification
- Kingdom: Animalia
- Phylum: Chordata
- Class: Amphibia
- Order: Anura
- Family: Pelodryadidae
- Genus: Dryopsophus
- Species: D. piperatus

Binomial name
- Dryopsophus piperatus (Tyler and Davies, 1985)
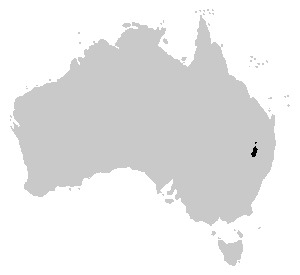
- Peppered tree frog range

Synonyms
- Litoria piperata Tyler and Davies, 1985; Ranoidea piperata

Species of amphibian

The peppered tree frog (Dryopsophus piperatus) is a species of frog in the family Pelodryadidae. It has a green back speckled with black, a cream-coloured belly and a dark stripe running from the shoulder. It is endemic to a very small area of the Northern Tablelands of New South Wales, Australia where it is known from five stream systems. It has not been observed in the wild since the 1970s, but a frog of very similar appearance has been observed in an area slightly further north, and it is not clear whether these are examples of the peppered tree frog or an outlying population of Pearson's green tree frog. The International Union for Conservation of Nature has assessed the peppered tree frog's conservation status as being "data deficient".

== Distribution ==
This species was formerly known from five streams at elevations of 800–1120 m draining east in the Northern Tablelands of NSW from Gibraltar Range in the north to Armidale in the south. After searches in these streams and adjacent areas, this species has not been located in the wild since 1973.

In 1999, though, frogs similar in appearance to this species were discovered in streams north of their known range. The frogs had calls similar to Pearson's green tree frog, and genetic testing is required to determine if this population is the peppered tree frog or a disjunct population of Pearson's green tree frog.

== Description ==
This is a small species of frog reaching 30 mm (1.2 in) in length. It is olive-grey to slate above, with many scattered black dots and tubercles across the back, flanks, and legs, giving the dorsal surface a "peppered" appearance, which gives this species its name. The tympanum is distinct. It has some green colouration on the side of the head. The toes discs are large, and toes are webbed. The belly is cream. An indistinct dark stripe runs from the shoulder, which is shared with other species in the leaf green tree frog complex, of which this species is a member. However, due to a lack of information on this species, it has been omitted from the complex key on that page.

== Behaviour and ecology ==
This species is associated with flowing, rocky creeks in highland areas of northern New South Wales. The call of this species has not been recorded but is likely to be similar to other species in the D. phyllochroa complex. Males are likely to call during spring and summer from vegetation and rocks bordering streams and creeks.

This species and the yellow-spotted bell frog, two species of frogs in the northern tablelands, suffered severe population declines in the 1980s. The cause of these declines is not fully understood, partly because it was too swift to document. Chytrid fungus is believed to have been a significant factor.
