= Glandular frog (disambiguation) =

The glandular frog (Hylarana glandulosa) is a species of frog in the family Ranidae of Southeast Asia.

Glandular frog may also refer to:

- Glandular bush frog (Raorchestes glandulosus), a frog in the family Rhacophoridae endemic to the Western Ghats, India
- Glandular tree frog (Litoria subglandulosa), a frog in the family Hylidae endemic to Australia

== See also ==
- Glandular-sided frog (Babina chapaensis), a frog in the family Ranidae found in Laos, Vietnam, and possibly Thailand
