= New England frog =

New England frog may refer to:

- New England swamp frog (Litoria castanea), a frog endemic to southeastern Australia
- New England tree frog (Litoria subglandulosa), a frog endemic to Australia
