= Kampira Falls frog =

Conservation status
- Endangered (IUCN 3.1)

Scientific classification
- Kingdom: Animalia
- Phylum: Chordata
- Class: Amphibia
- Order: Anura
- Family: Ranidae
- Genus: Nidirana
- Species: N. okinavana

Binomial name
- Nidirana okinavana (Boettger, 1895)

Synonyms
- Rana okinavana Boettger, 1895; Babina okinavana (Boettger, 1895); Babina psaltes (Kuramoto, 1985); Hylarana psaltes (Kuramoto, 1985); Nidirana psaltes (Kuramoto, 1985); Rana psaltes Kuramoto, 1985

Species of amphibian

The Kampira Falls frog (Nidirana okinavana), also known as the Yaeyama harpist frog or harpist brown frog, is a species in the true frog family (Ranidae). Until recently known as Rana psaltes, it is found on Ishigaki and Iriomote in the Yaeyama Islands of Japan, as well as on Taiwan.

It is a mid-sized, stout brown frog, with a distinctive suprabrachial gland and a fold of skin running from the shoulders to the hips.

Its natural habitats are subtropical or tropical moist lowland forests, subtropical or tropical seasonally wet or flooded lowland grassland, swamps, freshwater marshes, and canals and ditches. It is threatened by habitat loss.

== Taxonomy ==
This frog has a confusing taxonomic history which is entwined with that of the Ryūkyū brown frog. Oskar Boettger described a frog species from the Ryūkyū Islands as Rana okinavana. He could not tell for certain where these specimens were collected, as they had reached him via an animal trader and not from the actual collector, but suspected it to be Okinawa in the central Ryūkyūs, the most accessible island of the archipelago.

By 1907, it was known that what supposedly was the same medium-sized brown frog also occurred on the Yaeyama Islands in the southern Ryūkyū archipelago, though subsequently, Boettger's frog could only be found there. Later still, the presence of the brown frogs of Okinawa was verified and they were studied, with scientists believing that Boettger's taxon applied to them. Eventually, the situation had changed to R. okinavana supposedly referring to the Okinawan frogs only, with the Yaeyama frogs being either ignored or believed to belong to another species altogether. This was the situation by the time World War II interrupted further research, with some even believing it did not exist at all.

In the mid-20th century, the Okinawan and Yaeyama frogs were again united under R. okinavana, but once again without checking Boettger's type specimens. By the 1970s, however, the southern frogs, though superficially similar in being about the same size and color, were realized to differ significantly from those on Okinawa. Initially identified as R. adenopleura, the Yaeyama harpist frog was described as a new species, Rana psaltes, in 1985. Its another common name, Kampira Falls frog, refers to the Kampira Falls of the Urauchi River, the type locality of the species.

In 1999, upon examination of the lectotype of Boettger's R. okinavana, this animal was found to be very similar to R. psaltes, differing from the Okinawan brown frogs just as the recently described Yaeyama frogs did. Furthermore, Boettger's specimens turned out to be included in the same batch from the same collector as his specimens of Chirixalus eiffingeri. These specimens must have been collected on the Yaeyama Islands, however, as it certainly does not occur on Okinawa. Thus, the frogs formerly known as R. psaltes - which had also been found on Taiwan in the meantime - turned out to be the same species that Boettger had described, hence according to ICZN rules, it is now known as R. okinavana, while the Ryūkyū brown frog has yet to receive a scientific name. Furthermore, some slight differences exist between Boettger's types of R. okinavana and Kuramoto's types of R. psaltes which were collected on Iriomote Island. Should Boettger's specimen, e.g. by ancient DNA analysis, turn out to be from Ishigaki and be subspecifically distinct from the Iriomote population, the latter would become subspecies psaltes.
