= Nidirana hainanensis =

Conservation status
- Critically Endangered (IUCN 3.1)

Scientific classification
- Kingdom: Animalia
- Phylum: Chordata
- Class: Amphibia
- Order: Anura
- Family: Ranidae
- Genus: Nidirana
- Species: N. hainanensis

Binomial name
- Nidirana hainanensis (Fei, Ye, and Jiang, 2007)

Synonyms
- Hylarana hainanensis Fei, Ye, and Jiang, 2007; Babina hainanensis (Fei, Ye, and Jiang, 2007)

Species of frog

Nidirana hainanensis, or Hainan music frog, is a species of frog in the family Ranidae. It is endemic to Hainan Island, China. Described in 2007, it is only known from its type locality, Mount Diaoluo in Lingshui Li Autonomous County. It most closely resembles Nidirana adenopleura, a more widespread frog from southern and south-eastern China and Taiwan.
