= Pond frog (disambiguation) =

The pond frog is a genus of true frogs.

Pond frog may also refer to:

- Central Asian pond frog, a frog found in China, Tajikistan, and possibly in Afghanistan
- Daruma pond frog, a frog endemic to Japan
- Green pond frog, a frog found in Pakistan, India, Bangladesh, and Sri Lanka
- Seoul pond frog, a frog found in Korea
- Yunnan pond frog, a frog found in China and possibly Myanmar

== See also ==
- Frog Pond
