= Yunnan frog =

Yunnan frog may refer to:

- Yunnan Asian frog (Nanorana unculuanus), a frog endemic to Yunnan, China
- Yunnan odorous frog (Odorrana andersonii ), a frog found in India, Myanmar, China, Thailand, Laos, and Vietnam
- Yunnan paa frog (Nanorana yunnanensis), a frog found in China, Vietnam, Myanmar, and possibly Laos
- Yunnan pond frog (Babina pleuraden), a frog found in China and possibly Myanmar
