= Nidirana lini =

Conservation status
- Least Concern (IUCN 3.1)

Scientific classification
- Kingdom: Animalia
- Phylum: Chordata
- Class: Amphibia
- Order: Anura
- Family: Ranidae
- Genus: Nidirana
- Species: N. lini

Binomial name
- Nidirana lini (Chou, 1999)

Synonyms
- Rana lini Chou, 1999; Hylarana lini (Chou, 1999); Babina lini (Chou, 1999)

Species of frog

Nidirana lini is a species of frog in the family Ranidae. It is known with some certainty from southern Yunnan (China), Laos, Thailand, and north-western Vietnam. It has been mixed with Nidirana adenopleura and Nidirana chapaensis; its exact distribution is unclear, in particular whether populations referred to as N. adenopleura in southern China to Zhejiang in the east belong to this species.

It inhabits rice paddies, marshes, and ponds and the surrounding habitats, and it is locally common. It is threatened by harvesting, pollution, and habitat loss. The population number is unknown, but it is considered locally abundant. It is protected by Huanglianshan and Xishuangbanna Nabanhe Liuyu National Nature Reserves.
