= Ryukyu brown frog =

Conservation status
- Near Threatened (IUCN 3.1)

Scientific classification
- Kingdom: Animalia
- Phylum: Chordata
- Class: Amphibia
- Order: Anura
- Family: Ranidae
- Genus: Rana
- Species: R. kobai

Binomial name
- Rana kobai Matsui, 2011

Species of amphibian

The Ryūkyū brown frog (Rana kobai) is a species of true frog endemic to the Ryūkyū Islands, specifically Okinawa and perhaps neighboring islands.

Its natural habitats are subtropical or tropical moist lowland forests, subtropical or tropical moist montane forests, rivers, and freshwater marshes. It is threatened by habitat loss.

== Taxonomy ==
This frog has a convoluted taxonomic history; despite being known since the early 20th century, it was only described in 2011 and even more recently accepted. In 1895, Oskar Boettger described a middle-sized brownish frog species from the Ryūkyū Islands as Rana okinavana. It was noted that the type locality was undetermined—perhaps Okinawa, but the specimens were part of a shipment from an animal dealer, not supplied from the person who originally collected them. Some time later, it was mentioned in passing that mid-sized brown frogs were definitely found on Okinawa. However, collectors seeking out the frog described by Boettger there could not find it; they instead encountered that animal on some of the Yaeyama Islands in the southern Ryūkyū Islands.

Others believed that the brown frog of the Ryūkyūs occurred only on Okinawa, and that this consequently must be Boettger's R. okinavana. When World War II interrupted further research, Boettger's taxon was firmly associated with the Okinawan brown frogs, though nobody ever had bothered to travel to the Senckenberg Museum or the Übersee-Museum in Germany to directly compare the type specimens with frogs from Okinawa.

By the mid-20th century, it was recognized that on both Okinawa and the Yaeyama group brown frogs could be found, and R. okinavana was applied to them, without comparing actual specimens. By the 1970s, it was realized that the Okinawan frogs were not found on the Yaeyama Islands, but only a superficially similar but stouter frog with a distinctive suprabrachial gland and a fold of skin running from the shoulders to the hips. The Yaeyama frogs were at first identified as R. adenopleura and eventually described as a new species, Rana psaltes, in 1985.

In 1999, upon examination of the lectotype of Boettger's R. okinavana, it was realized that this animal was very similar to R. psaltes, differing from the Okinawan brown frogs just as the recently described Yaeyama frogs did. It furthermore turned out that Boettger's brown frog specimens were included in the same batch from the same collector as his specimens of Chirixalus eiffingeri. These specimens must have been collected on the Yaeyama Islands, as the species certainly does not occur on Okinawa. And thus, the frogs formerly known as R. psaltes, which had also been found on Taiwan in the meantime, turned out to be the same species that Boettger had described, and hence according to ICZN rules is now known as R. okinavana.
