= Kroombit tree frog =

Conservation status
- Critically endangered (EPBC Act)

Scientific classification
- Kingdom: Animalia
- Phylum: Chordata
- Class: Amphibia
- Order: Anura
- Family: Pelodryadidae
- Genus: Dryopsophus
- Species: D. kroombitensis

Binomial name
- Dryopsophus kroombitensis (Hoskin et al, 2013) Dubois & Frétey, 2016

Synonyms
- Litoria kroombitensis Hoskin, Hines, Meyer, Clarke & Cunningham, 2013; Ranoidea kroombitensis Duellman, Marion & Hedges, 2016

Species of Australian frog

The Kroombit tree frog (Dryopsophus kroombitensis), or Kroombit treefrog, is a species of small frog that is endemic to Australia.

== Description ==
The species grows to not more than about 45 mm in length (SVL), with females being on average some 25% longer than males. Colouration is mostly green or greenish-brown with orange on the thighs and thin gold lines extending over the eyes and tympanums to the front limbs. The mating call is a short whine followed by one or two chirps.

== Behaviour ==
The species is a stream breeder, laying clumps of 100–300 eggs embedded in jelly which are wrapped around submerged twigs in still or slow-flowing water.

== Distribution and habitat ==
The species is found in the Central Highlands Region of Queensland, where it is restricted to the headwaters of five streams rising on the eastern side of Kroombit Tops, an ecologically isolated plateau covered with temperate wet forests, with an altitudinal range of 550–900 m, that is surrounded by subtropical woodlands.

== Conservation ==
Although the species is protected by the Kroombit Tops National Park, threats to the population include the fungal disease chytridiomycosis; habitat degradation and water fouling caused by the activities of feral cattle, horses and pigs; as well as the impact of climate change, such as increased frequency and severity of bushfires. The species is listed as Critically Endangered under Australia's Environment Protection and Biodiversity Conservation Act 1999.
