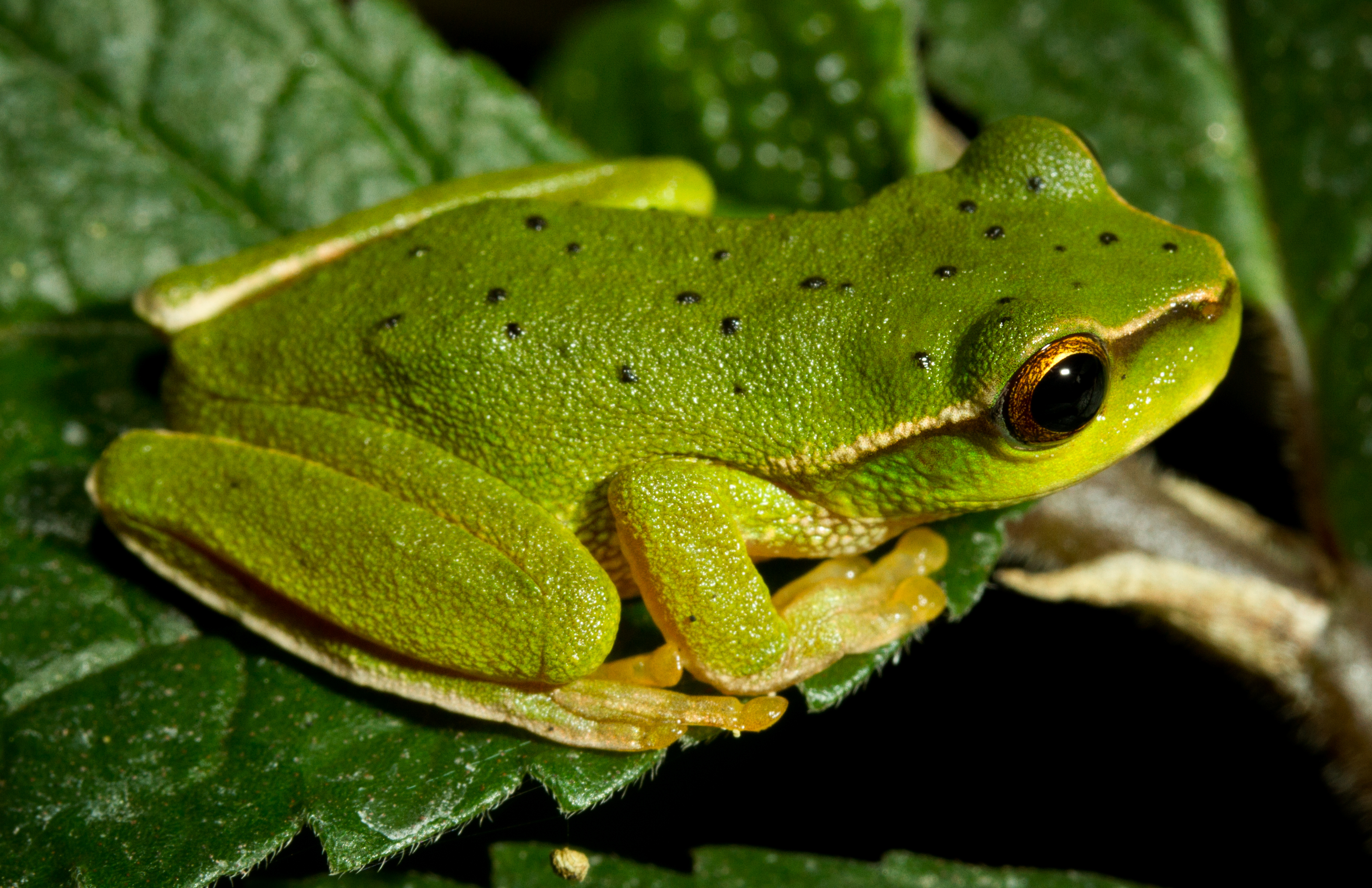
- Mountain stream frog in Nowendoc, New South Wales, Australia

Scientific classification
- Kingdom: Animalia
- Phylum: Chordata
- Class: Amphibia
- Order: Anura
- Family: Pelodryadidae
- Genus: Dryopsophus; Mahony, Donnellan & Richards, 2025

Species
- See text

= Dryopsophus =

Genus of amphibians

Dryopsophus is a genus of stream-dwelling frogs in the family Pelodryadidae. These frogs are native to the Great Dividing Range in eastern Australia. Species in the genus were previously included within the wastebasket genus Litoria, but were separated into a new genus in 2025. They are small-to-medium sized frogs, and most species are predominantly green in colour, but some species can also be brown.

== Species ==
Dryopsophus contains ten species, all native to the creeks of eastern Australia:

Common name	Binomial name
Mountain stream tree frog	Dryopsophus barringtonensis (Copland, 1957)
Blue Mountains tree frog	Dryopsophus citropa (Péron, 1807)
Davies' tree frog	Dryopsophus daviesae (Mahony, Knowles, Foster, and Donnellan, 2001)
Kroombit tree frog	Dryopsophus kroombitensis (Hoskin, Hines, Meyer, Clarke, and Cunningham, 2013)
Southern leaf green tree frog	Dryopsophus nudidigitus (Copland, 1963)
Pearson's green tree frog	Dryopsophus pearsonianus (Copland, 1961)
Leaf green tree frog	Dryopsophus phyllochrous (Günther, 1863)
Peppered tree frog	Dryopsophus piperatus (Tyler and Davies, 1985)
Spencer's river tree frog	Dryopsophus spenceri (Dubois, 1984)
New England tree frog	Dryopsophus subglandulosus (Tyler and Anstis, 1983)
