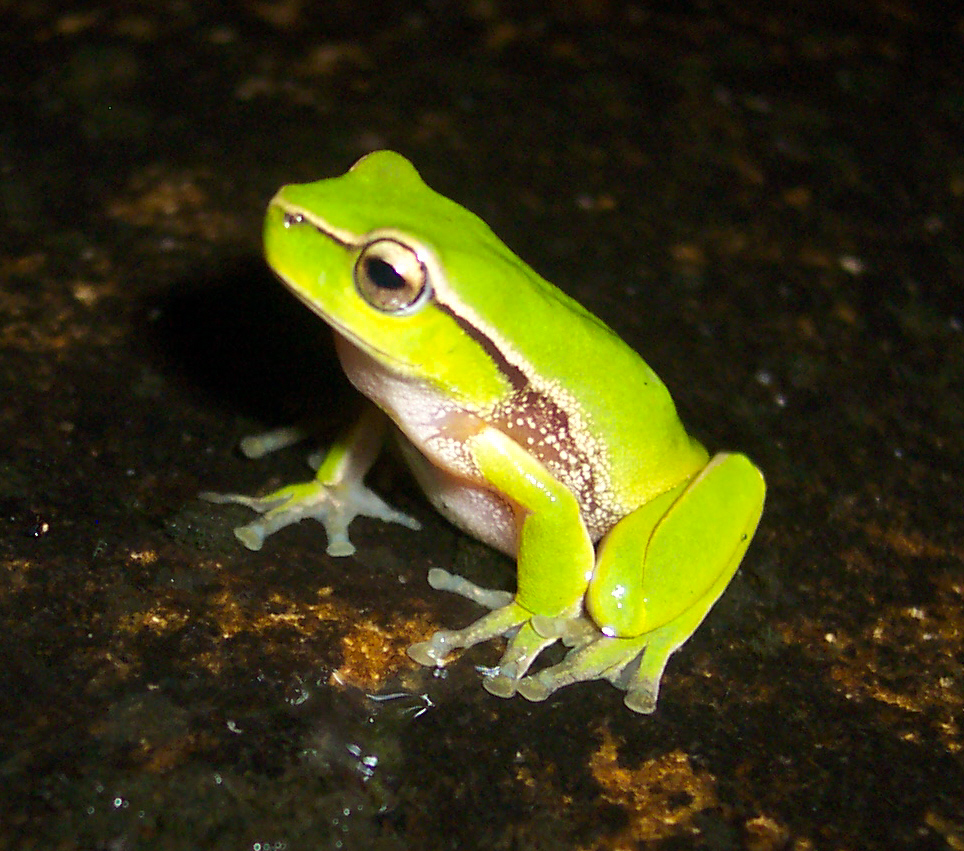

Scientific classification
- Kingdom: Animalia
- Phylum: Chordata
- Class: Amphibia
- Order: Anura
- Family: Pelodryadidae
- Genus: Dryopsophus
- Species: D. nudidigitus

Binomial name
- Dryopsophus nudidigitus (Copland, 1962)
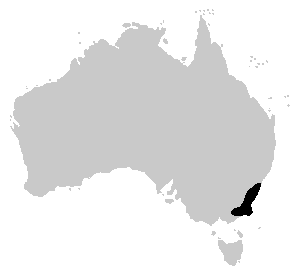
- Distribution of the southern leaf green tree frog

Synonyms
- Litoria nudidigita Copland, 1962; Litoria nudidigitus Copland, 1962; Ranoidea nudidigitus

= Southern leaf green tree frog =

Species of amphibian

The southern leaf green tree frog (Dryopsophus nudidigitus) is a species of tree frog native to coastal areas and the ranges of south-eastern Australia. It is distributed from just south of Sydney to eastern Victoria.

== Description ==
Ranoidea nudidigitus is a small species of tree frog, up to about 40 mm (1.6 in) in length. Adults are normally green on their dorsal surfaces (although at times they can be brown), but metamorph frogs are always dull brown in colour. They are very similar to the leaf green tree frog (Dryopsophus phyllochroa), and distribution and call are used to distinguish the two. The tympanum is indistinct (it is distinct in D. phyllochrous). A black stripe on the side of the head starts at the nostril and continues down the side of the frog; it often gets larger the further down the frog it goes. A gold stripe occurs above the black one and follows it in the same direction.

== Ecology and behaviour ==
This species has only recently been separated from the leaf green tree frog; Sydney, Australia is considered the dividing point for the two species' range. D. nudidigitus ranges to the south and D. phyllochrous to the north. Hybridisation is possible around southern Sydney, from the Royal National Park to about Wollongong. This area is regarded as the hybrid zone.

This species is associated with streams and creeks in rainforests, as well as wet or dry sclerophyll forests. It is rarely found away from running water.

Males have a call similar to that of D. phyllochrous, composed of a long first note, and followed by a series of shorter notes. Males call during spring and summer from vegetation around a stream.

== Key ==
For more information in distinguishing this species from leaf green tree frog, Pearson's green tree frog, and the mountain stream tree frog, refer to the article for leaf green tree frog#Key.

== Sources ==
- Anstis, M. 2002. Tadpoles of South-eastern Australia. Reed New Holland: Sydney.
- Frogs of Australia-frog call available here.
- Frogs Australia Network
