= Nidirana noadihing =

Scientific classification
- Domain: Eukaryota
- Kingdom: Animalia
- Phylum: Chordata
- Class: Amphibia
- Order: Anura
- Family: Ranidae
- Genus: Nidirana
- Species: N. noadihing

Binomial name
- Nidirana noadihing Boruah et al., 2023

Species of frog

Nidirana noadihing is a species of frog in the family Ranidae. It is found in Arunachal Pradesh of India and it is said to be first species recorded in the genus Nidirana from India. The new species came from the place, Noa-Dihing River, from where the specimens were collected. This Noa-Dihing Music Frog is differed from other species of Nidirana genus by its size, oval toe tips, the tubercles on their backs and the unique call reminiscent of "wild duck species". The species is named after the Noa-Dahing River.
