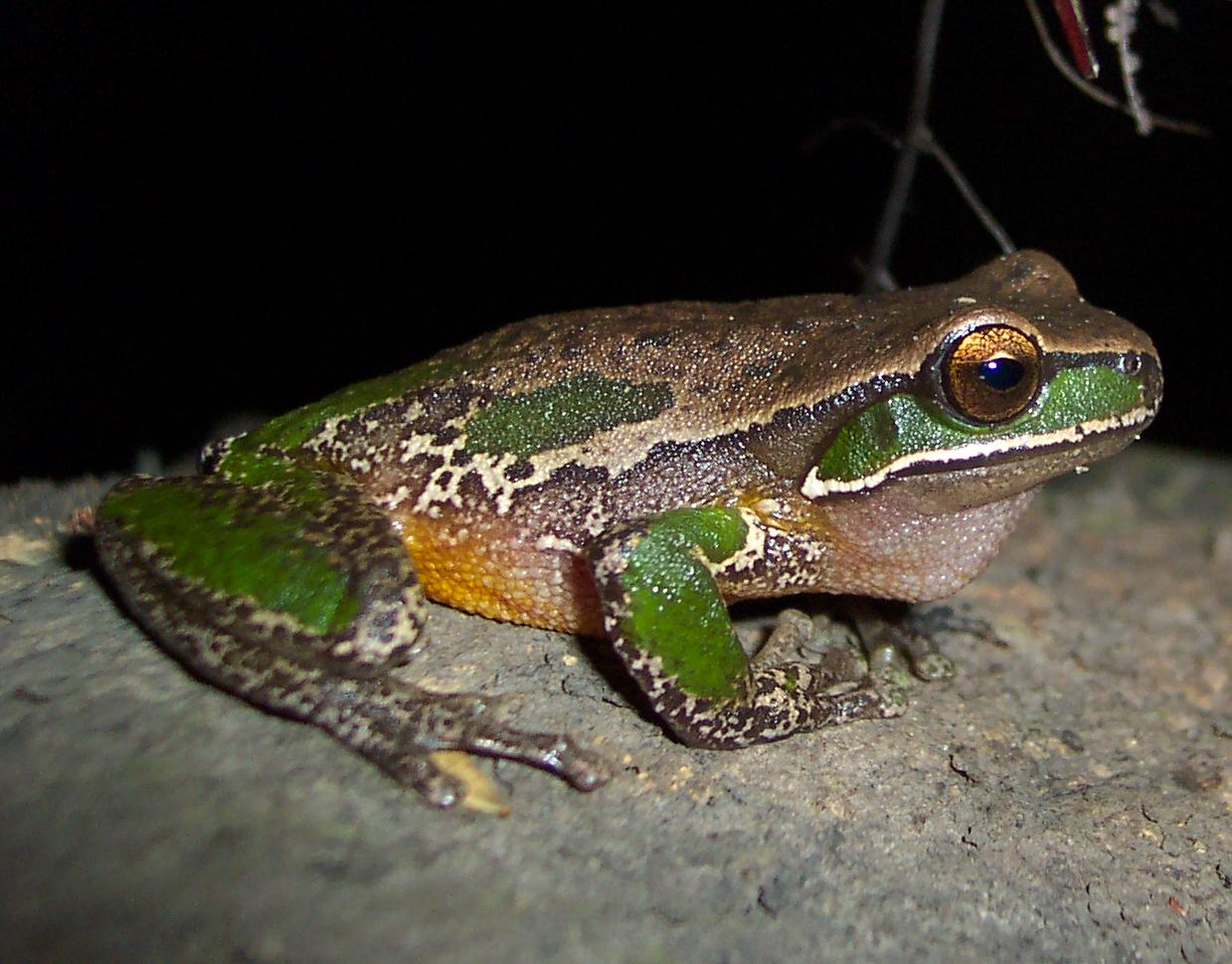

Conservation status
- Vulnerable (IUCN 3.1)

Scientific classification
- Kingdom: Animalia
- Phylum: Chordata
- Class: Amphibia
- Order: Anura
- Family: Pelodryadidae
- Genus: Dryopsophus
- Species: D. daviesae

Binomial name
- Dryopsophus daviesae (Mahony, Knowles, Foster & Donnellan, 2001)

Synonyms
- Litoria daviesae Mahony, Knowles, Foster & Donnellan, 2001; Ranoidea daviesae

= Davies' tree frog =

Species of amphibian

Davies' tree frog (Dryopsophus daviesae) is a species of frog in the family Pelodryadidae. It is endemic to Australia. Its natural habitats are subtropical or tropical dry forests, subtropical or tropical moist lowland forests, subtropical or tropical dry shrubland, and rivers. It is currently threatened by habitat loss.

== Etymology ==
The specific name daviesae honours Dr. Margaret M. Davies, an Australian herpetologist.

== Description ==
Davies' tree frog is a medium-size species which grows to a maximum snout-to-vent length of 53 millimetres (2.1 in) for males and 63 millimetres (2.5 in) for females. The colour of the upper surface is somewhat variable, being mainly golden brown with darker brown patches but sometimes additionally having green patches. There is a narrow brown stripe running from the nostrils through the eye and back towards the groin, broadening towards the posterior and then becoming intermittent. Below the eye is a green band running as far as the shoulder and there is a thin white line along the edge of the upper lip. The skin on the underside has fine granulations. Davies' tree frog is very similar in appearance to the closely related New England tree frog but is larger, is less green and has a slightly bumpy rather than a smooth skin.

== Distribution and habitat ==
Davies' tree frog is endemic to the eastern side of the Great Dividing Range in New South Wales, Australia. It has been found in a number of separate locations from north of the Hunter River to the Hastings River drainage, a distance of about 150 kilometres (93 mi). It is only known from altitudes greater than 400 metres (1,300 ft) and is found near streams and rivers with well-vegetated banks. In deep gullies the surrounding area is wet sclerophyll forest and rainforest while in the tableland the streamside vegetation is mostly tea tree (Leptospermum sp.), ferns, and grass tussocks in areas of dry, open woodland or heathland.

== Conservation status ==
Davies' tree frog has a very restricted range and an area of occurrence of less than 20,000 square kilometres (7,700 sq mi). It is an uncommon frog and its habitat is threatened by forest clearance for agricultural purposes, and some of the streams in which the frog breeds have been stocked with exotic fish such as trout, carp and mosquitofish which may feed on the tadpoles. For these reasons, the IUCN has assessed this frog as being a "vulnerable species". As of March 2023, the species is also classified as vulnerable under the Environment Protection and Biodiversity Conservation Act 1999.
