= Nidirana =

Scientific classification
- Kingdom: Animalia
- Phylum: Chordata
- Class: Amphibia
- Order: Anura
- Family: Ranidae
- Genus: Nidirana; Dubois, 1992

Species
- See text

Genus of frogs

Nidirana is a genus of true frogs (Ranidae) from East and Southeast Asia. They are commonly known as music frogs. This genus contains numerous species that were formerly classified in the genus Babina, which is thought to be its sister genus.

== Species ==
The following species are recognized within Nidirana:

- Nidirana adenopleura (Boulenger, 1909)
- Nidirana cangshanensis Liu, Hou & Rao, 2025
- Nidirana chapaensis (Bourret, 1937)
- Nidirana chongqingensis Ma & Wang, 2023
- Nidirana daunchina (Chang, 1933)
- Nidirana guangdongensis Lyu, Wan, and Wang, 2020
- Nidirana guangxiensis Mo, Lyu, Huang, Liao, and Wang, 2021
- Nidirana hainanensis (Fei, Ye, and Jiang, 2007)
- Nidirana leishanensis Li, Wei, Xu, Cui, Fei, Jiang, Liu, and Wang, 2019
- Nidirana lini (Chou, 1999)
- Nidirana mangveni Lyu, Qi, and Y.-y. Wang, 2020
- Nidirana nankunensis Lyu, Zeng, Wang, Lin, Liu, and Wang, 2017
- Nidirana occidentalis Lyu, Yang, and Wang, 2020
- Nidirana okinavana (Boettger, 1895)
- Nidirana pleuraden (Boulenger, 1904)
- Nidirana shiwandashanensis Chen, Peng, Li, and Liu, 2022
- Nidirana shyhhuangi C.-F. Lin, Chang, Matsui, Shen, Tominaga & S.-M. Lin, 2025
- Nidirana xiangica Lyu and Wang, 2020
- Nidirana yaoica Lyu, Mo, Wan, Li, Pang, and Wang, 2019
- Nidirana yeae Wei, Li, Liu, Cheng, Xu, and Wang, 2020
- Nidirana noadihing Boruah, Deepak & Das, 2023
