= Emei music frog =

Conservation status
- Least Concern (IUCN 3.1)

Scientific classification
- Kingdom: Animalia
- Phylum: Chordata
- Class: Amphibia
- Order: Anura
- Family: Ranidae
- Genus: Nidirana
- Species: N. daunchina

Binomial name
- Nidirana daunchina (Chang, 1933)

Synonyms
- Rana daunchina Chang, 1933; Hylarana daunchina (Chang, 1933); Babina daunchina (Chang, 1933)

Species of amphibian

The Emei music frog (Nidirana daunchina) is a species of frog in the family Ranidae. It is endemic to China, and is found in central China, in southeastern Sichuan, northeastern Yunnan and western Guizhou provinces. The species name refers to the type locality, Mount Emei in Sichuan, and its vocalizing abilities. The original name Rana musica was replaced with Rana daunchina as the former name was already taken.

The Emei music frog is a common species. Its natural habitats are subtropical moist montane forests, swamps, freshwater marshes, intermittent freshwater marshes, rural gardens, heavily degraded former forest, ponds, and irrigated land.

The Emei music frogs are medium-sized frogs: males grow to a snout–vent length of 46 mm (1.8 in) and females to 49 mm (1.9 in). Tadpoles are up to 47 mm (1.9 in) in length.

== Vocalization ==
Vocalizations are important for sexual selection in frogs. the Emei music frog is unusual among amphibians in that both male and females frogs are vocal. Males vocalize and mate in well-hidden underground nests. Acoustic characters of the male calls from inside the burrows convey information concerning the burrow characteristics that female frogs can use when choosing mates. Male calls have thereby been likened to "real estate ads". The role of female calls is to increase the rate of male advertisement, which may help females to find and choose mates.
