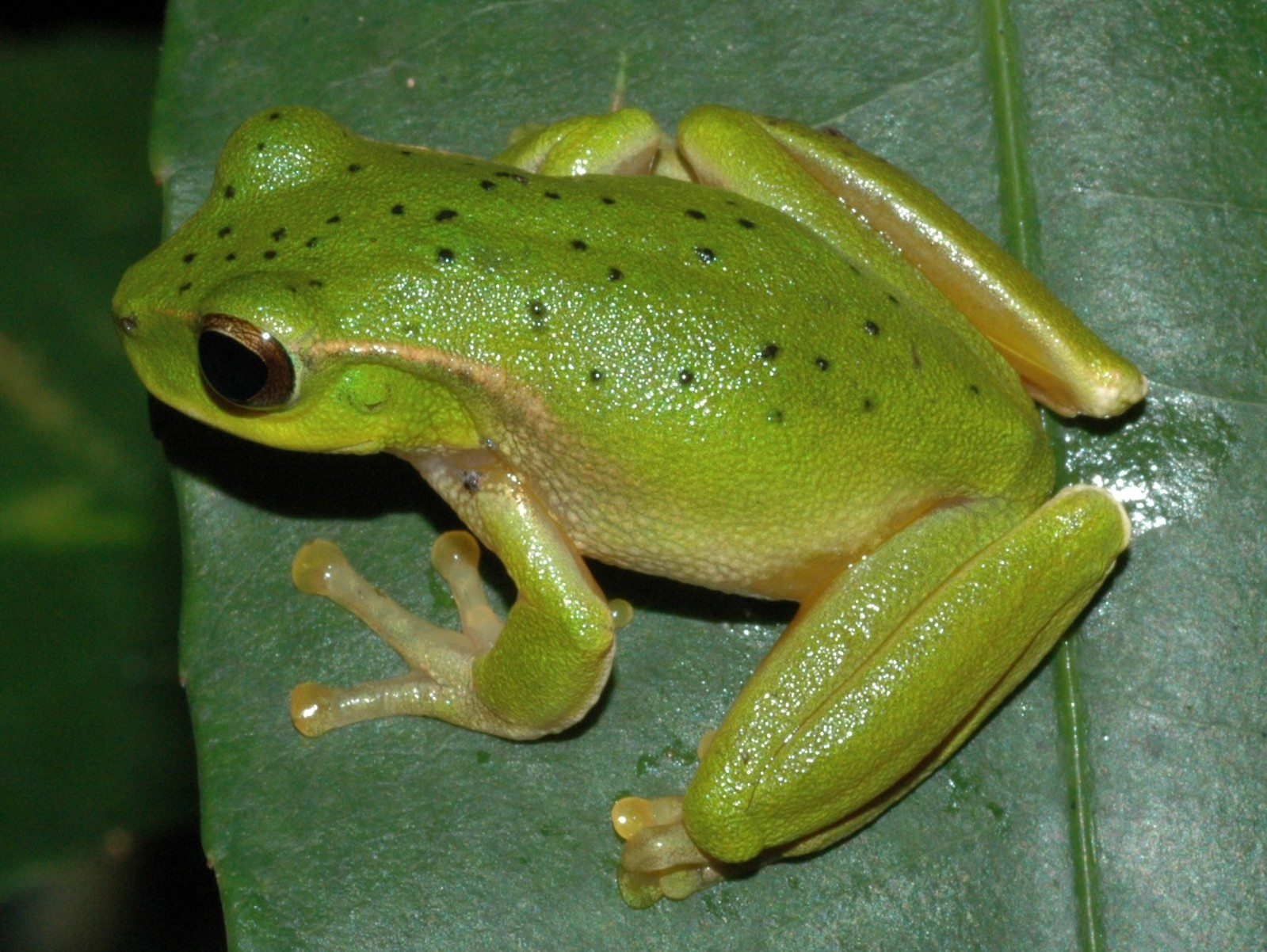

Scientific classification
- Kingdom: Animalia
- Phylum: Chordata
- Class: Amphibia
- Order: Anura
- Family: Pelodryadidae
- Genus: Dryopsophus
- Species: D. barringtonensis

Binomial name
- Dryopsophus barringtonensis (Copland, 1957)
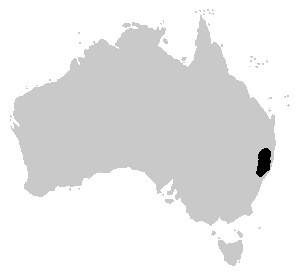
- Distribution of the mountain stream tree frog

Synonyms
- Litoria barringtonensis Copland, 1957; Ranoidea barringtonensis

= Mountain stream tree frog =

Species of amphibian

The mountain stream tree frog (Dryopsophus barringtonensis) is a species of tree frog native to highland areas of NSW, Australia stretching from the Myall Lakes area, north to around Dorrigo National Park and west to Barrington Tops National Park.

== Taxonomy ==
Dryopsophus barringtonensis may be conspecific to the Pearson's green tree frog (Dryopsophus pearsoniana). Morphological differences have not been fully studied yet, but visible physical differences between frogs from Barrington Tops and Dorrigo, New South Wales, in comparison to frogs from south-eastern Queensland and northern NSW are discussed in a key on the leaf green tree frog page. These are representative of frogs described as L. barringtonensis and L. pearsoniana.

== Description ==
The mountain stream tree frog is a relatively small tree frog growing up to 45 mm in length. It is light green to dark/olive green on the dorsal surface and sometimes brown morphs are encountered. The thighs are a mango-yellow colour and the belly is off-white. A pale brown (almost light yellow) stripe runs from the nostril, across the eye, over the tympanum, and down to the shoulder, where the line widens and dissipates. Randomly placed black dots are scattered over the dorsal surface. Metamorphs closely resemble the adults, although they are mostly brown in colour. The tadpoles of the D. phyllochrous complex (leaf green tree frog (D. phyllochrous), Pearson's green tree frog (D. pearsoniana), southern leaf green tree frog (D. nudidigitus) and the mountain stream tree frog (D. barringtonensis) are very similar in appearance and are very hard to tell apart. Range is best used to distinguish the species.

== Ecology and behaviour ==
This species inhabits flowing creeks in mountainous areas, in rainforests and adjacent wet sclerophyll forests, as its name suggests. Males call from stream-side vegetation during spring and summer; the call is similar to that of the leaf green tree frog.

This species is rarely described in field guides due to its similarity to the Pearson's green tree frog and due to the taxonomy being under review.

== As a pet ==
It is kept as a pet; in Australia this animal may be kept in captivity with the appropriate permit.
