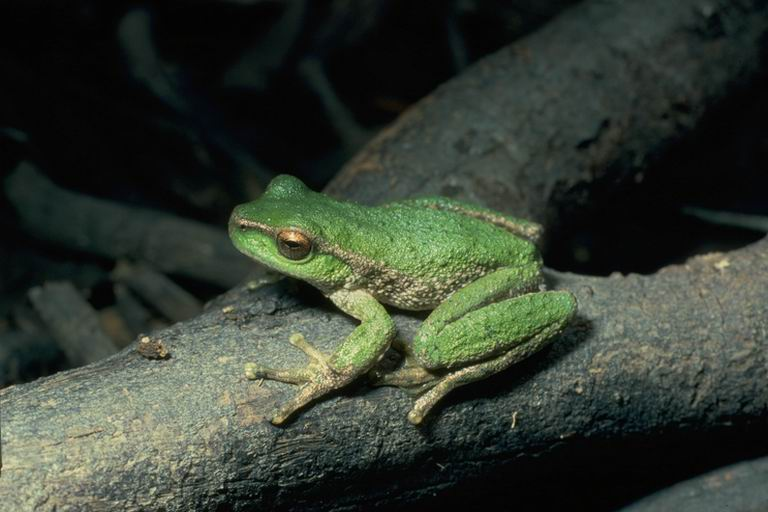

Conservation status
- Critically Endangered (IUCN 3.1)

Scientific classification
- Kingdom: Animalia
- Phylum: Chordata
- Class: Amphibia
- Order: Anura
- Family: Pelodryadidae
- Genus: Dryopsophus
- Species: D. spenceri

Binomial name
- Dryopsophus spenceri (Dubois, 1984)

Synonyms
- Ranoidea spenceri (Dubois, 1984); Litoria spenceri Dubois, 1984

= Spencer's river tree frog =

Species of amphibian

Spencer's river tree frog (Dryopsophus spenceri), also known as Spencer's tree frog or spotted tree frog, is a species of frog in the family Pelodryadidae.

It is endemic to Australia. Its natural habitats are subtropical or tropical moist lowland forest, subtropical or tropical moist montane forest, and rivers. It is threatened by habitat loss.
