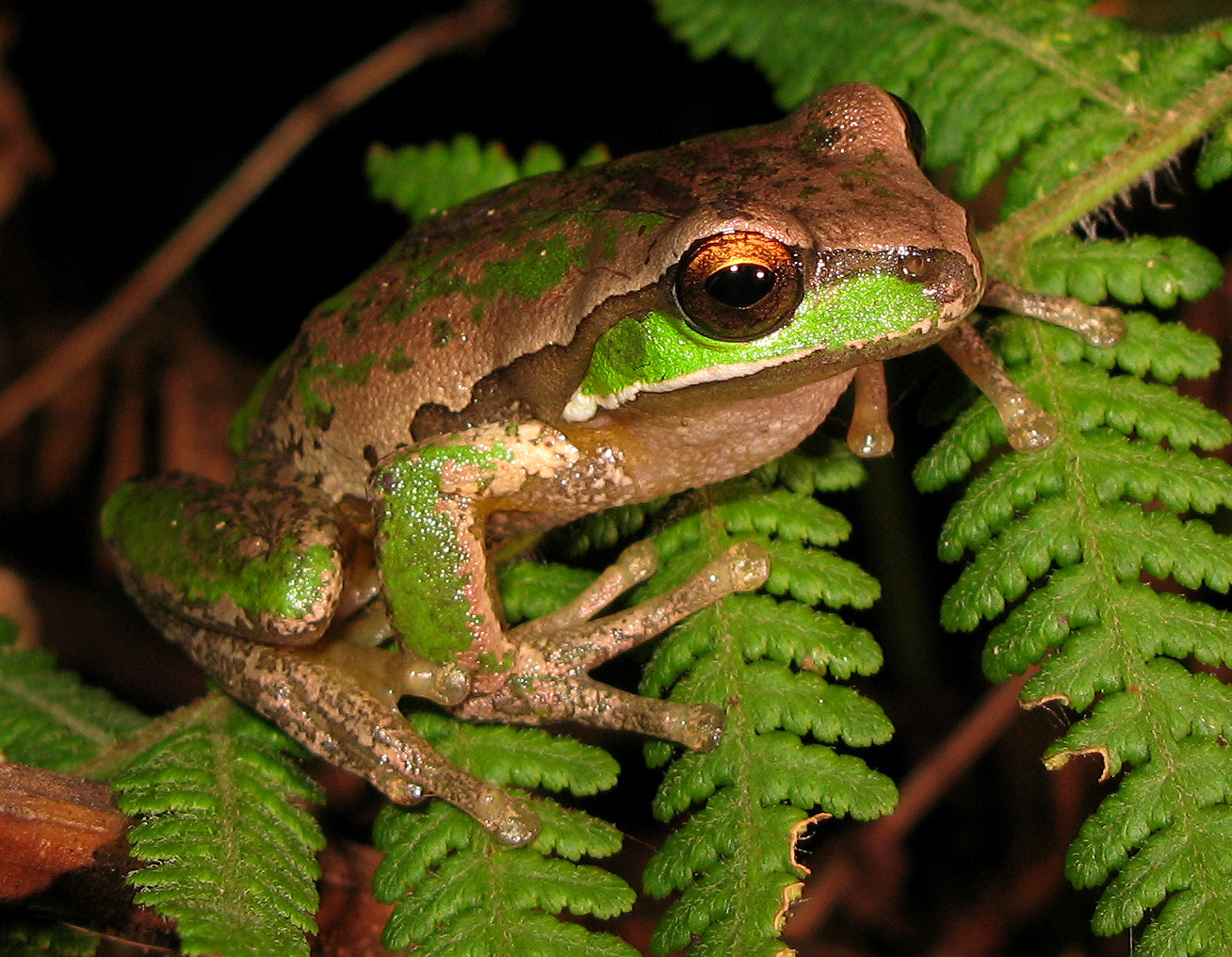

Conservation status
- Vulnerable (IUCN 3.1)

Scientific classification
- Kingdom: Animalia
- Phylum: Chordata
- Class: Amphibia
- Order: Anura
- Family: Pelodryadidae
- Genus: Dryopsophus
- Species: D. subglandulosus

Binomial name
- Dryopsophus subglandulosus (Tyler & Anstis, 1983)

Synonyms
- Litoria subglandulosa Tyler & Anstis, 1983; Ranoidea subglandulosus

= New England tree frog =

Species of amphibian

The New England tree frog or glandular tree frog (Dryopsophus subglandulosus) is a species of frog in the subfamily Pelodryadinae, endemic to Australia. Its natural habitats are temperate forests, subtropical or tropical moist lowland forests, subtropical or tropical moist montane forests, temperate shrubland, rivers, and pastureland. It is threatened by habitat loss.

== Description ==
The male New England tree frog reaches a snout-to-vent length of 40 mm (1.6 in) while the females reach 50 mm (2.0 in). The upper parts are green or greenish-brown often flecked with black. A white line runs along the upper lip and a straw-coloured line runs from the snout, through the eyes and tympani to the groin. The lower parts of the sides and the back of the thighs are bright orange-red. There are enlarged pads on the digits enabling the frog to climb. This frog is very similar in appearance to the Blue Mountains tree frog but as their ranges do not overlap, there is little chance of confusion. The skin is smooth whereas in the closely related and similar-looking Davies' tree frog the skin usually has small raised bumps.

== Distribution ==
The New England tree frog is native to the New England Tableland in eastern Australia where it occurs at altitudes between 500 and 1,100 metres (1,600 and 3,600 ft). Its range extends northwards from the Werrikimbe National Park in New South Wales to southern Queensland and in the Nowendoc area it is the most common species of frog present in streams. It is an adaptable species and occurs in both wet and dry sclerophyll forests, in mountain woodland and cleared pasture. It is likely to be present in any stream with well-vegetated verges.

== Behaviour ==
Male frogs start calling at night in August or September and the breeding season continues until December, the call being described as a series of "orak..orak..orak" sounds continuing for about ten seconds. The males advertise their presence from logs or low vegetation beside streams, especially favouring Callicoma and Lomandra. The eggs are laid in shady parts of the stream and attached to submerged vegetation. The tadpoles grow to a length of about 35 mm (1.4 in) and are unique among Australian treefrog tadpoles in not having horny beaks, instead having a ring of tentacle-like papillae surrounding the mouth. It is not known on what the tadpoles feed but the adult frogs are presumed to eat small invertebrates. Their habits outside the breeding season are little known.

== Status ==
The New England tree frog has a very restricted range and fragmented population, with an area of occurrence of less than 20,000 square kilometres (7,700 sq mi). It is an uncommon frog and its habitat is threatened by clearance of vegetation along riverbanks and by pollution, and some of the streams in which the frog breeds have been stocked with exotic fish such as trout. For these reasons, the IUCN has assessed this frog as being a "vulnerable species". As of September 2023, the species is also classified as vulnerable under the Environment Protection and Biodiversity Conservation Act 1999.
