= Nidirana chapaensis =

Chapa frog

Conservation status
- Least Concern (IUCN 3.1)

Scientific classification
- Kingdom: Animalia
- Phylum: Chordata
- Class: Amphibia
- Order: Anura
- Family: Ranidae
- Genus: Nidirana
- Species: N. chapaensis

Binomial name
- Nidirana chapaensis (Bourret, 1937)

Synonyms
- Hylarana chapaensis Bourret, 1937; Rana chapaensis (Bourret, 1937); Babina chapaensis (Bourret, 1937)

Species of amphibian

Nidirana chapaensis, commonly known as the Chapa frog or glandular-sided frog, is a species of frog in the family Ranidae. It is found in Laos, Vietnam, and Thailand, although records from Thailand may refer to Nidirana lini.

Nidirana chapaensis is associated with pools and small streams. It is at least locally common, and it appears to tolerate some habitat modification. Considering these factors and the relatively broad distribution of N. chapaensis, IUCN does not consider it threatened.
