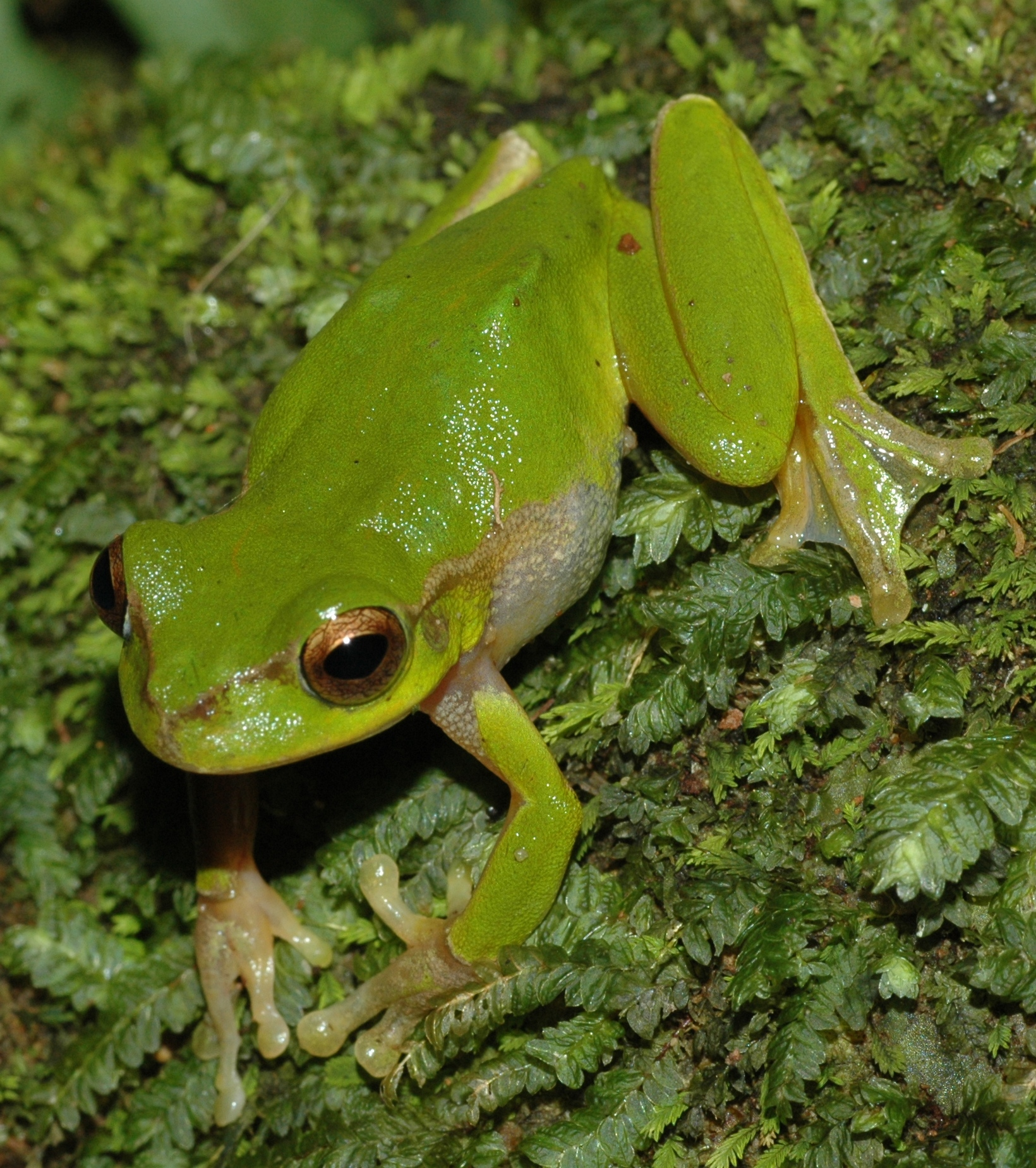

Conservation status
- Least Concern (IUCN 3.1)

Scientific classification
- Kingdom: Animalia
- Phylum: Chordata
- Class: Amphibia
- Order: Anura
- Family: Pelodryadidae
- Genus: Dryopsophus
- Species: D. pearsoniana

Binomial name
- Dryopsophus pearsoniana (Copland, 1961)
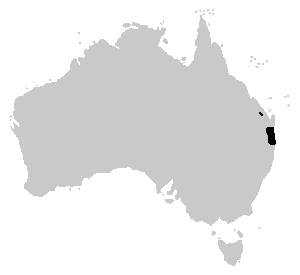
- Distribution

Synonyms
- Litoria pearsoniana Copland, 1961; Ranoidea pearsoniana

= Pearson's green tree frog =

Species of amphibian

Pearson's green tree frog (Dryopsophus pearsoniana), also known as the cascade tree frog, is a species of tree frog inhabiting rainforest creeks from north of Lismore, New South Wales, to Kenilworth, Queensland, with a disjunct population at Kroombit Tops Queensland, Australia.

== Taxonomy ==
The mountain stream tree frog may be conspecific to Pearson's green tree frog. Morphological differences have not been fully studied yet, but visible physical differences between frogs from Barrington Tops and Dorrigo, New South Wales, in comparison to frogs from south-eastern Queensland and northern New South Wales are discussed in a key on the leaf green tree frog page. These are representative of frogs described as D. barringtonensis and D. pearsoniana.

== Description ==
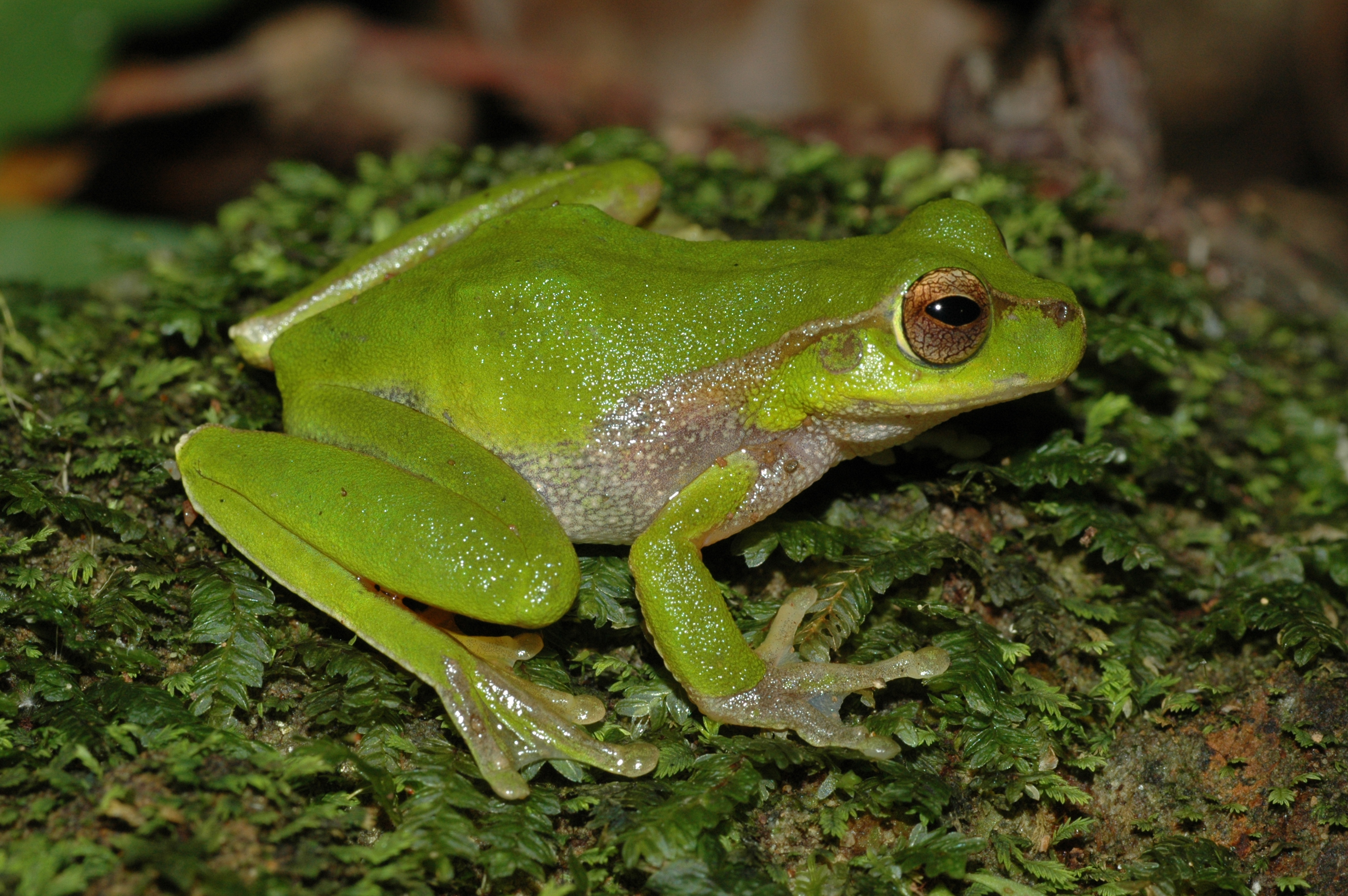

Pearson's tree frog is a small tree frog growing up to 45 mm in length. Its dorsal surface can range from completely light green, to a mixture of green and brown, or mostly brown in colour. Usually, black dots are scattered over the dorsal surface, but in some specimens, these dots may not occur. The belly is white or off white. A light brown/yellow stripe starts at the tip of the snout, across the nostril, eye, and tympanum, and then widens and dissipates over the shoulder. This line is underlined with a thicker dark brown line. The tympanum of this species is brown or mostly brown, not green. The tadpoles of the D. phyllochroa complex (D. phyllochroa, southern leaf green tree frog, D. barringtonensis and D. pearsoniana) are very similar in appearance and are difficult to tell apart; range is the best method for distinguishing tadpoles.

== Ecology and behaviour ==
This species inhabits flowing creeks in rainforests and wet sclerophyll forests in highland and coastal areas. Males call from creek-side vegetation during spring and summer. The call is an "eh-eh-eh-eh-eh-eh-ehk", with the sounds getting faster towards the end of the call, almost forming a trill.

The taxonomy of this species and the mountain stream tree frog is currently under review.

== Conservation status ==
It is listed as Least Concern on the IUCN Red List, but under Queensland's Nature Conservation Act 1992, it is considered Endangered.
