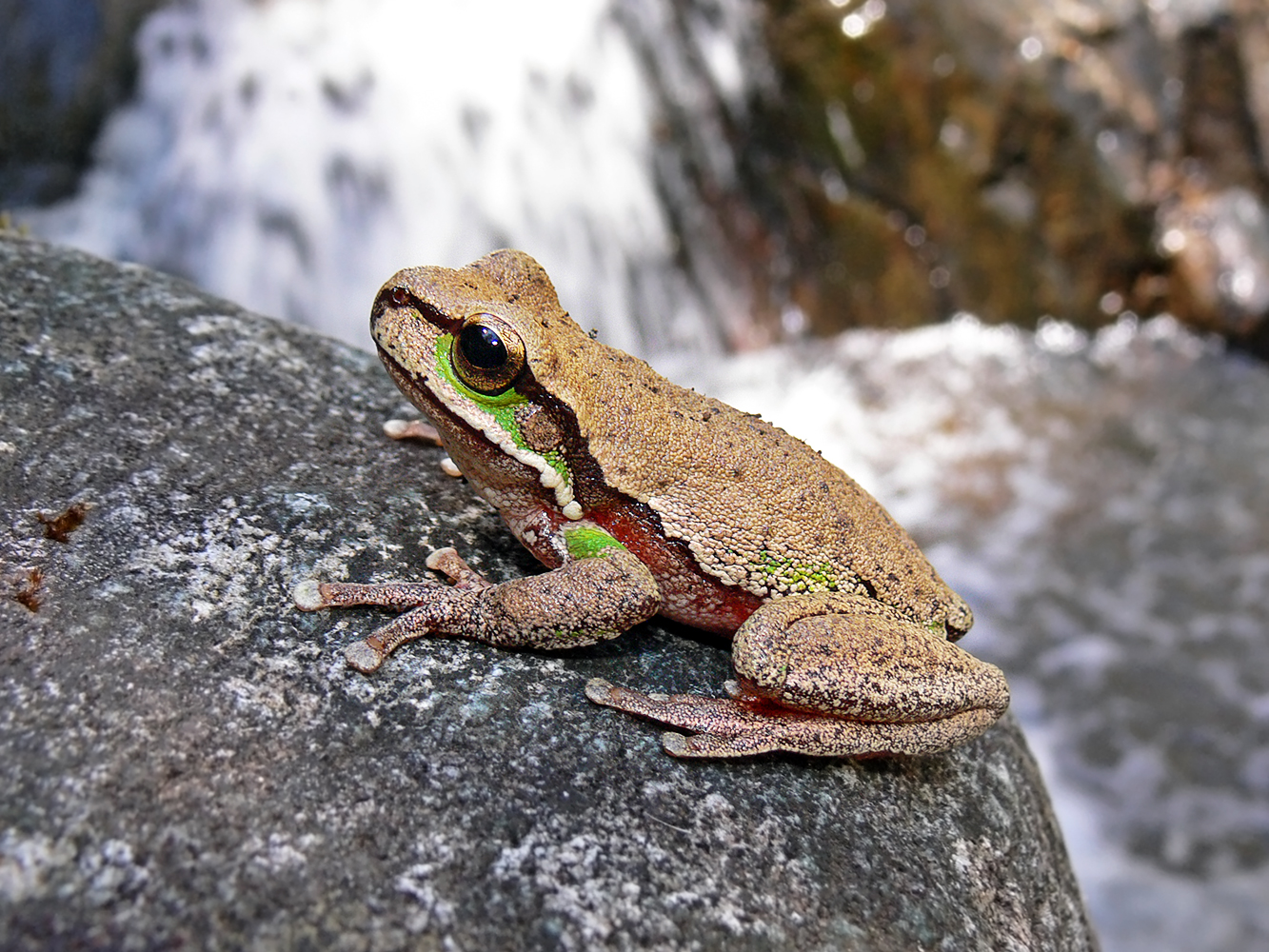

Conservation status
- Least Concern (IUCN 3.1)

Scientific classification
- Kingdom: Animalia
- Phylum: Chordata
- Class: Amphibia
- Order: Anura
- Family: Pelodryadidae
- Genus: Dryopsophus
- Species: D. citropa

Binomial name
- Dryopsophus citropa (Péron, 1807)
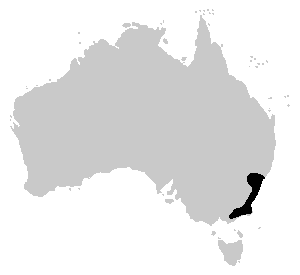
- Distribution of the Blue Mountains tree frog

Synonyms
- List: Hyla citripoda Péron, 1807; Dendrohyas citropa (Péron, 1807); Hyla citropa Péron, 1807; Hyla jenolanensis Copland, 1957; Litoria citropa (Péron, 1807); Litoria jenolanensis (Copland, 1957); Dryopsophus citropa (Péron, 1807); Dryopsophus jenolanesis (Copland, 1957); Dryopsophus citropus (Péron, 1807)

= Blue Mountains tree frog =

Species of amphibian

The Blue Mountains tree frog (Dryopsophus citropa) also called the variegated river tree frog is a species of tree frog in the family Pelodryadidae. It is endemic to southeastern Australia and is found in eastern Victoria and in southeastern New South Wales. The Jenolan Caves tree frog, a population formerly separated as Litoria jenolanensis, is nowadays included in this species.

== Description ==
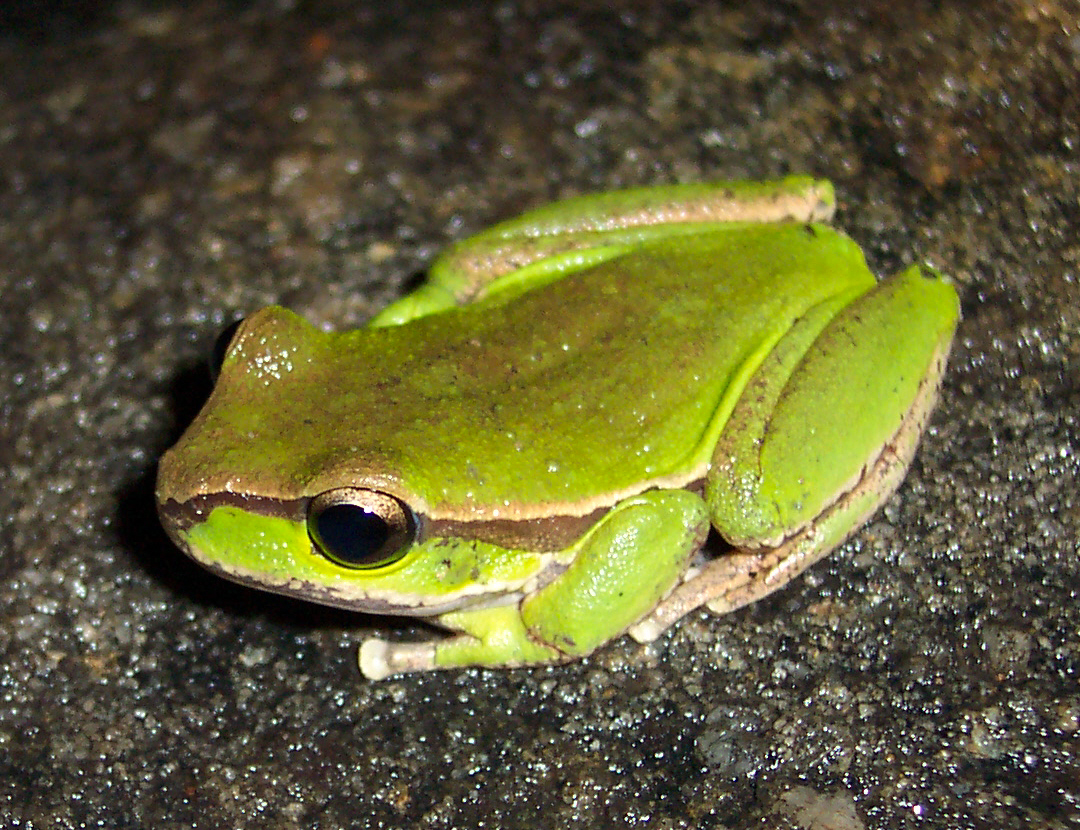
A green morph of Dryopsophus citropa

This is a moderate-sized frog, up to about 60 mm (2.4 in) in length. Its dorsal surface is brown with a few darker flecks. There is a dark stripe that runs from the nostril, above the tympanum, to the groin. There is a lighter golden stripe above and adjacent to the dark stripe. Their head, arms, legs, and the side of their body are green in colour. The amount of green on an individual frog can range from almost none at all to an all green colour morph. The green colour can occasionally be aqua-green. The armpit, thigh, groin, and inner section of the foot are bright red-orange in colour. The belly is white.

== Ecology and behaviour ==
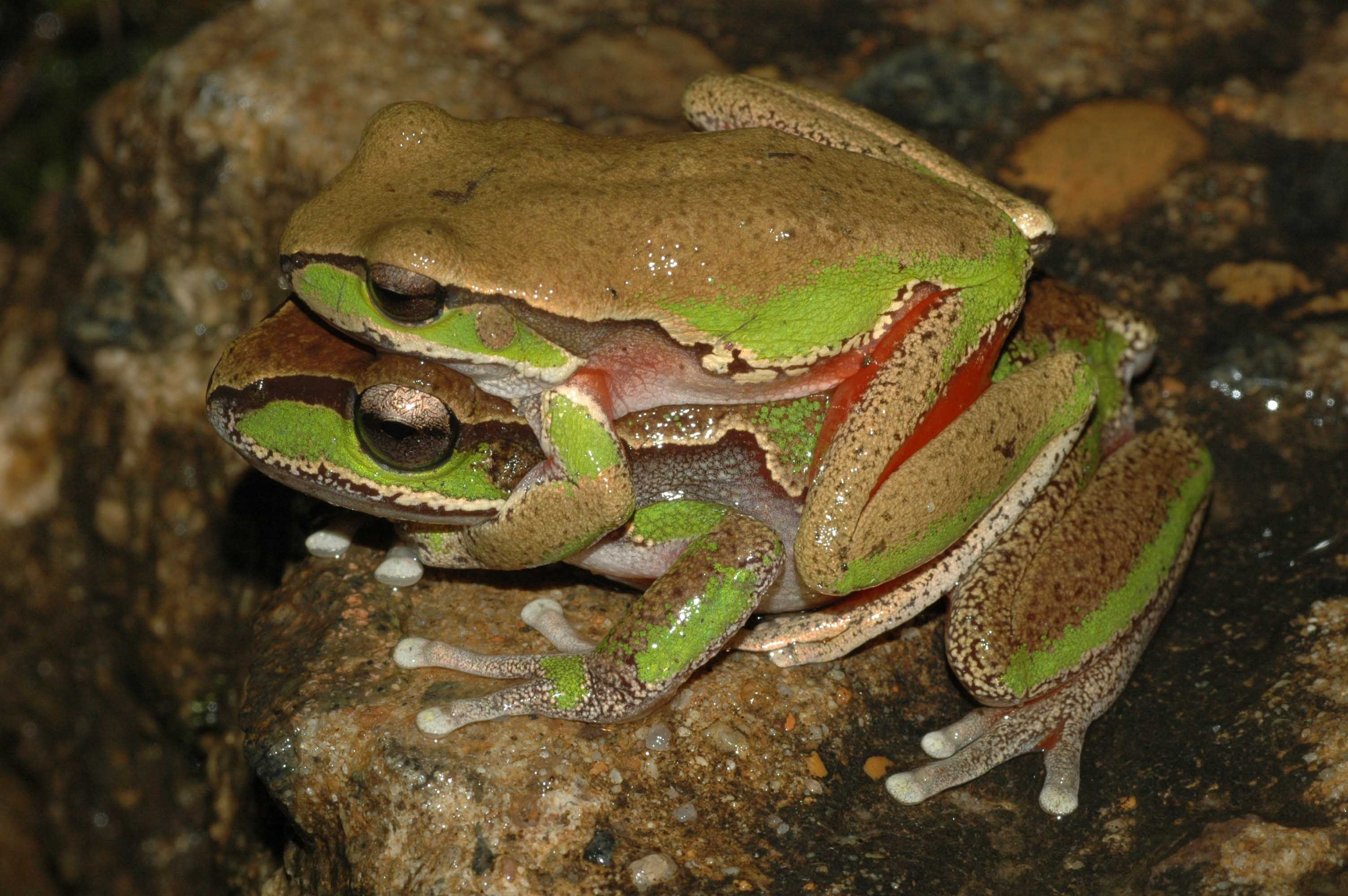
Blue Mountains tree frogs in amplexus

This species is associated with flowing rocky streams in woodland and wet or dry sclerophyll forest. This species has a two-part call, the first is a strong warrrrrk followed by several shorter notes, that sound like a golf ball going in a hole. Males call from streamside vegetation and rocks in the stream from spring to summer, normally after heavy rain.

This species is often found in highland areas, especially the Blue Mountains, hence its name.

The Blue Mountains tree frog is a host of Chlamydophila pneumoniae and Mesocoelium. It is also preyed upon by the Australian copperhead.

== As a pet ==
It can be kept as a pet in Australia, in captivity with the appropriate permit.

== Diet ==
Tree frogs generally eat a variety of insects; in captivity, they eat gut-loaded crickets, their own tadpoles, guppies, spiders, and worms.

== Sources ==
- Anstis, M. 2002. Tadpoles of South-eastern Australia. Reed New Holland: Sydney.
- Robinson, M. 2002. A Field Guide to Frogs of Australia. Australian Museum/Reed New Holland: Sydney.
- Frogs Australia Network-frog call available here.
- Frog and tadpole Study Group
- Frogs of Australia
- Department of Environment, Climate Change and Water, New South Wales: Amphibian Keeper's Licence: Species Lists
