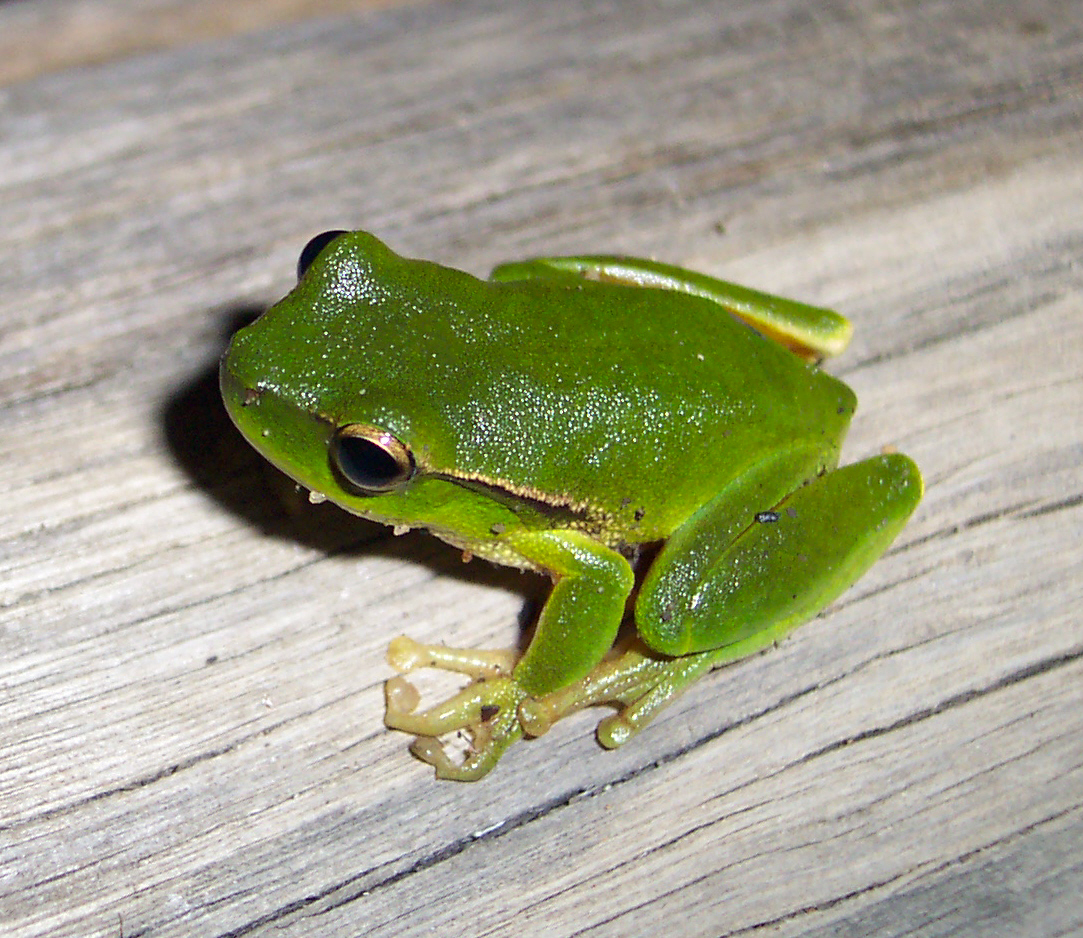

Conservation status
- Least Concern (IUCN 3.1)

Scientific classification
- Kingdom: Animalia
- Phylum: Chordata
- Class: Amphibia
- Order: Anura
- Family: Pelodryadidae
- Genus: Dryopsophus
- Species: D. phyllochrous

Binomial name
- Dryopsophus phyllochrous (Günther, 1863)
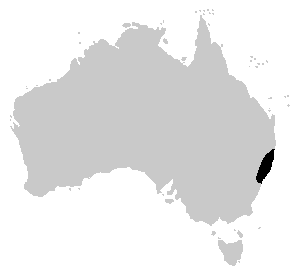
- Distribution

Synonyms
- Litoria phyllochroa Günther, 1863; Ranoidea phyllochroa

= Leaf green tree frog =

Species of amphibian

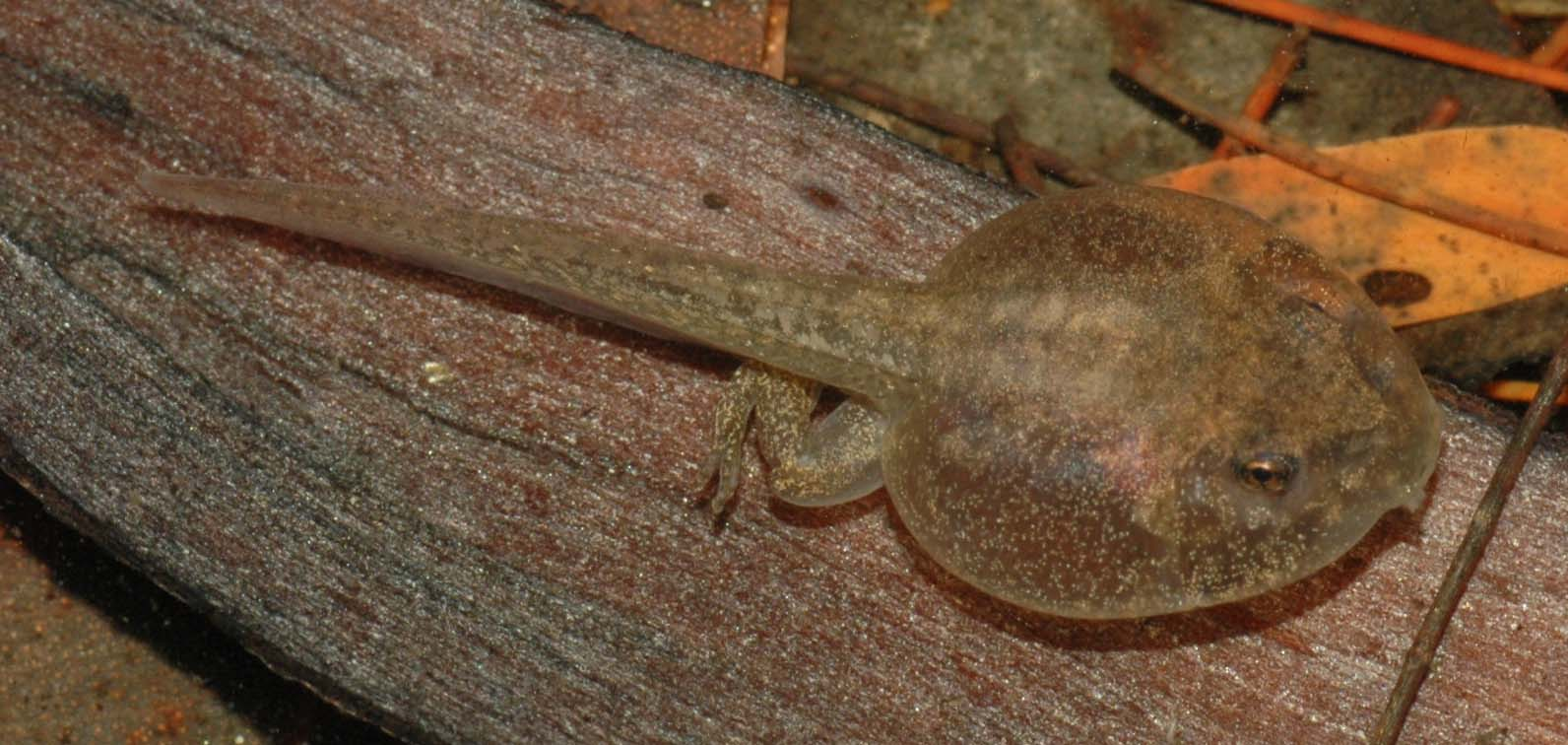
Tadpole

The leaf green tree frog (Dryopsophus phyllochrous) is a species of stream-dwelling frog, native to eastern Australia from the Queensland/New South Wales border south to Sydney.

== Description ==
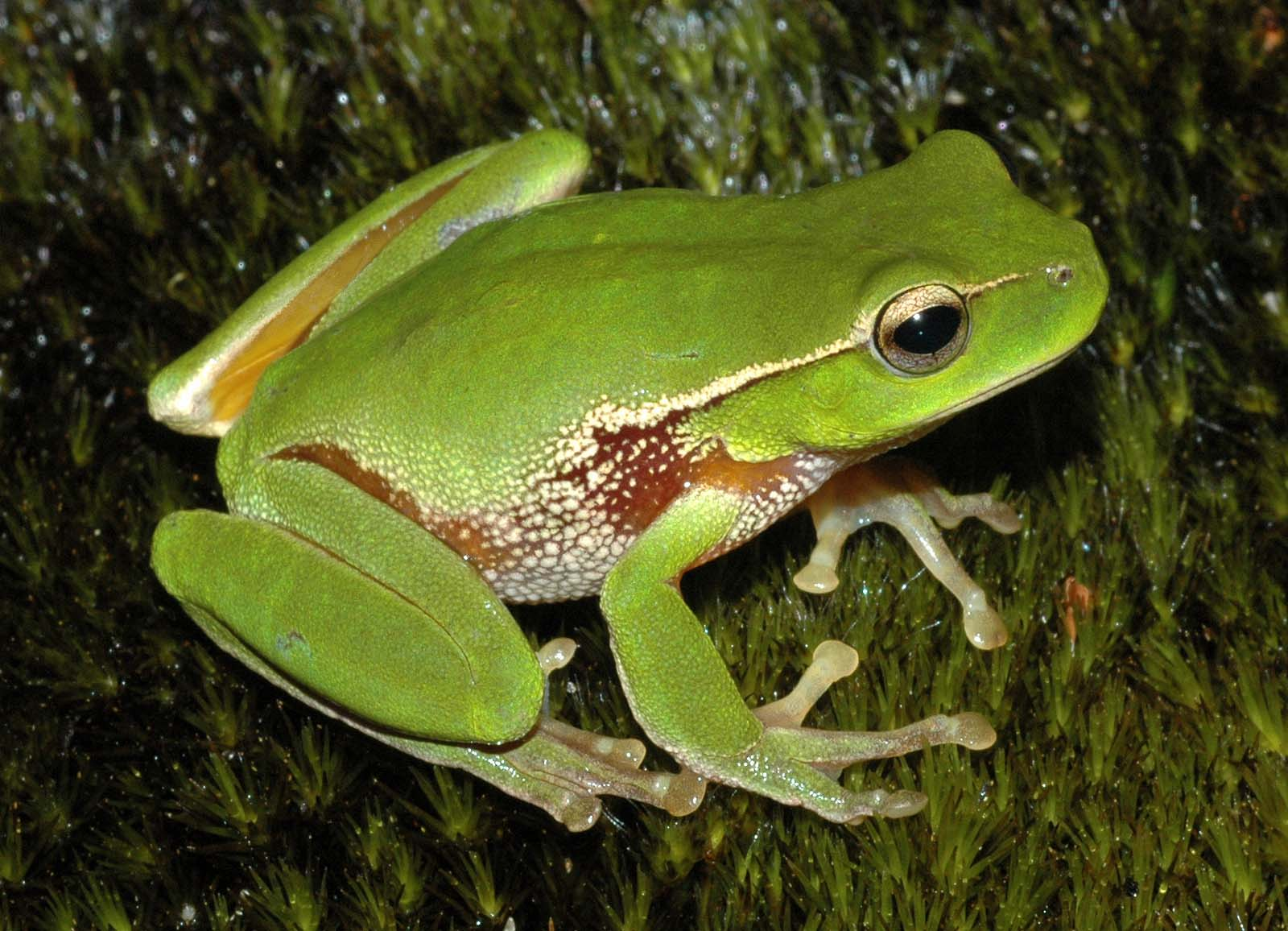
A specimen from the "hybrid zone" of the leaf green tree frog and southern leaf green tree frog showing physical characteristics of both species

This is a fairly small species of tree frog, up to about 40 mm (1.6 inches) in length. It can be light green to dark olive green to light brown to dark brown on the dorsal surface. A pale golden stripe runs from the nostril, across the eye, over the typanum, and down the side, underlined by a dark brown stripe, which also goes over the typanum, not across it. The forelimbs, groin, and thighs are dark red. The toes are three-quarters webbed and toe discs are large. The belly is white.

== Ecology and behaviour ==
This species inhabits flowing streams in rainforest, woodland, and wet or dry sclerophyll forest along the coast and ranges of New South Wales. Males make an "Erk..Ek..Ek..Derk" call from stream-side vegetation during spring, summer and autumn, especially on warm nights; they are often seen in suburban creeks around Sydney and near the sea.

== Key ==
This key distinguishes between the physical differences of the leaf green tree frog, southern leaf green tree frog and frogs that represent species described as Pearson's green tree frog and mountain stream tree frog. All of these species are very closely related and look similar. Their taxonomy species is under review.

Distribution:

D. barringtonensis - mid-north coast of NSW
D. nudidigitus - south of Sydney, NSW
D. phyllochrous - from Sydney to mid-north coast of NSW
D. pearsoniana - north-east NSW and south-east Qld

Dorsal surface

D. barringtonensis - black dots present, usually very distinct and many dots (see photo)
D. nudidigitus - no black dots present
D. phyllochrous - no black dots present
D. pearsoniana - black dots usually present (not as distinct and not as many as L. barringtonensis), although some specimens have none, or very few

Tympanum:

D. barringtonensis - distinct, no colouration
D. nudidigitus - indistinct, no colouration
D. phyllochrous - distinct, no colouration
D. pearsoniana - distinct, brown in colour

Shoulder and groin colouration:

D. barringtonensis - None present.
D. nudidigitus - red to black colouration (shoulder), red (groin)
D. phyllochrous - red-brown colouration (shoulder), red (groin)
D. pearsoniana - none present

Head stripe:

D. barringtonensis - light brown or yellow, passes over the tympanum
D. nudidigitus - gold with a black underline, passes over the tympanum
D. phyllochrous - gold with a dark brown underline, passes over the tympanum
D. pearsoniana - light brown with a thicker brown underline, passes through the tympanum

== As a pet ==
It is kept as a pet; in Australia, this animal may be kept in captivity with the appropriate permit.

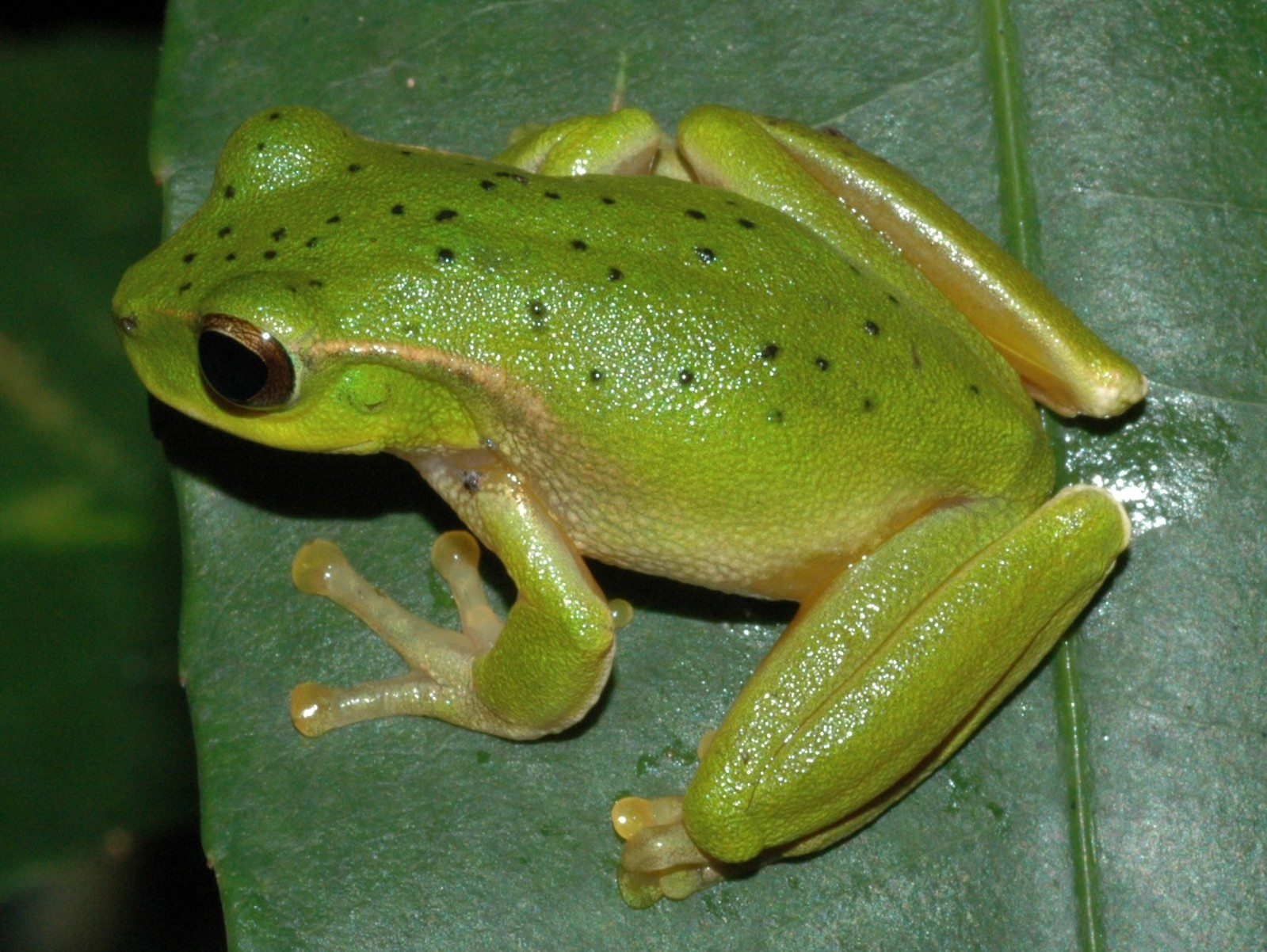
Dryopsophus barringtonensis

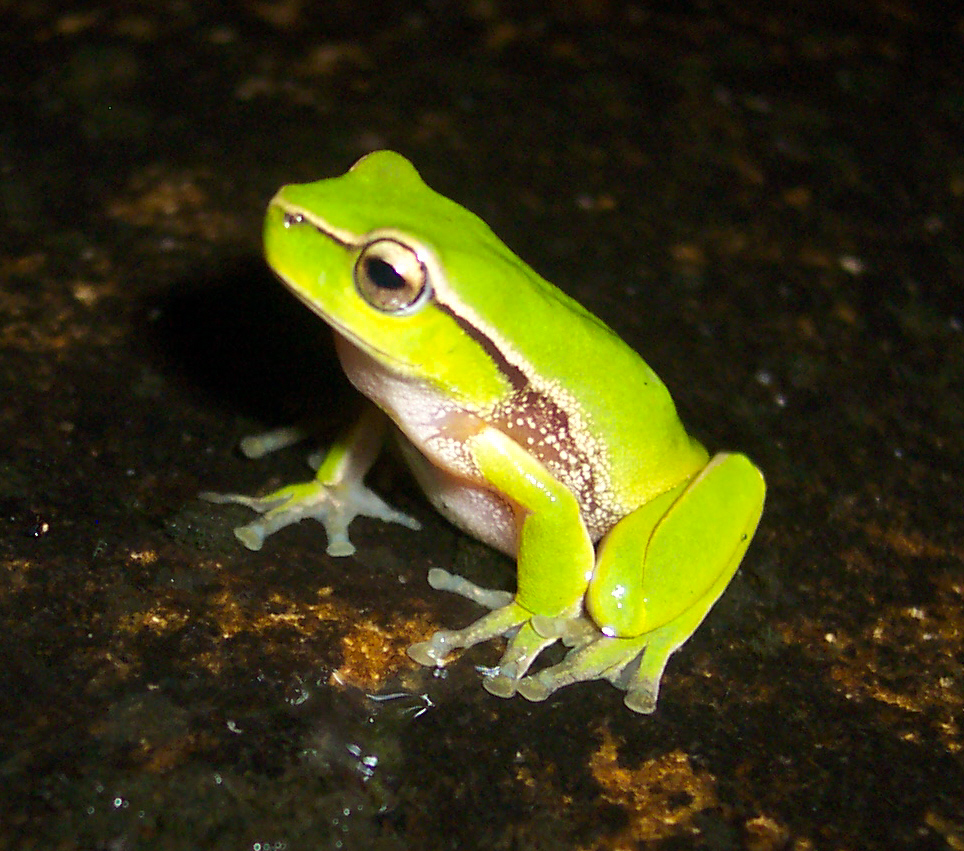
Dryopsophus nudidigitus

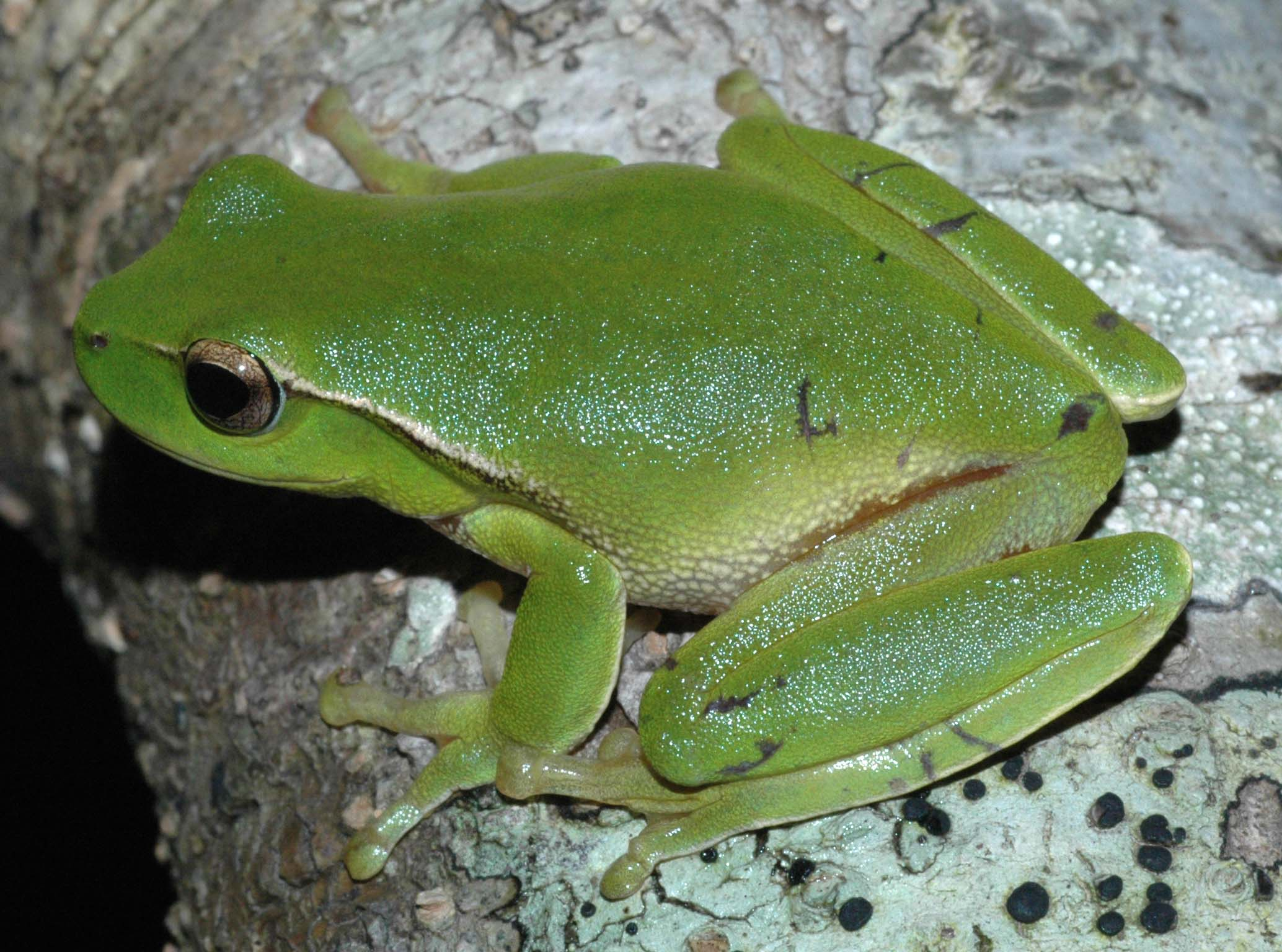
Dryopsophus phyllochrous

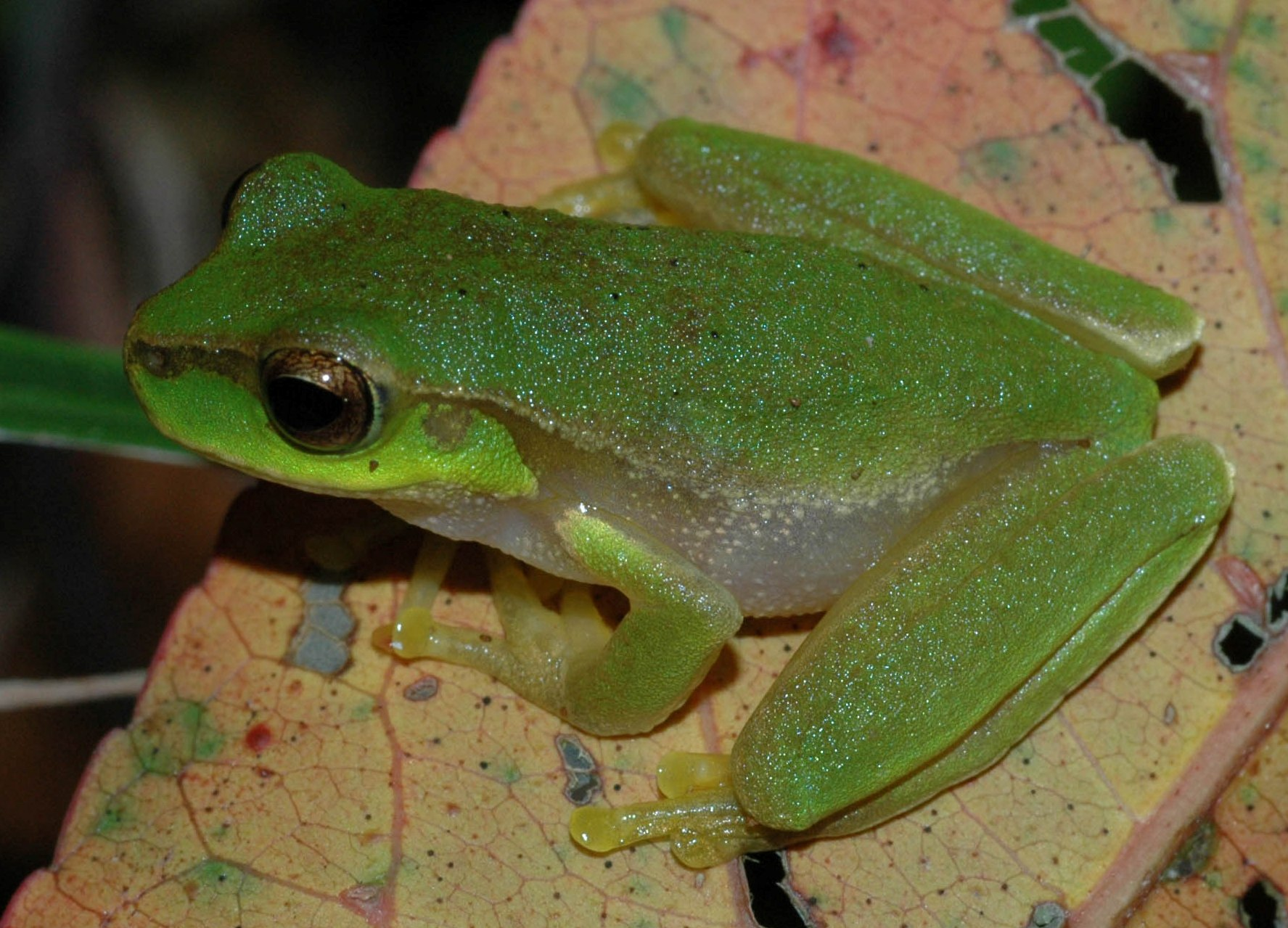
Dryopsophus pearsoniana

== Sources ==
- Anstis, M. 2002. Tadpoles of South-eastern Australia. Reed New Holland: Sydney.
- Robinson, M. 2002. A Field Guide to Frogs of Australia. Australian Museum/Reed New Holland: Sydney.
- Frogs Australia Network-frog call available here.
- Frog and Tadpole Study Group
