= Nidirana pleuraden =

Yunnan pond frog

Conservation status
- Least Concern (IUCN 3.1)

Scientific classification
- Kingdom: Animalia
- Phylum: Chordata
- Class: Amphibia
- Order: Anura
- Family: Ranidae
- Genus: Nidirana
- Species: N. pleuraden

Binomial name
- Nidirana pleuraden (Boulenger, 1904)

Synonyms
- Rana pleuraden Boulenger, 1904; Pelophylax pleuraden (Boulenger, 1904); Babina pleuraden (Boulenger, 1904)

Species of amphibian

The Yunnan pond frog (Nidirana pleuraden) is a species of frog in the family Ranidae found in south-western China (Yunnan, Sichuan, and Guizhou provinces) and possibly in adjacent parts of Myanmar. The total length of this medium-sized frog is 54–56 mm (2.1–2.2 in).

Its natural habitats are swamps, freshwater marshes, intermittent freshwater marshes, ponds, aquaculture ponds, open excavations, irrigated land, seasonally flooded agricultural land, canals, and ditches. It is a common species, though it has recently declined.
