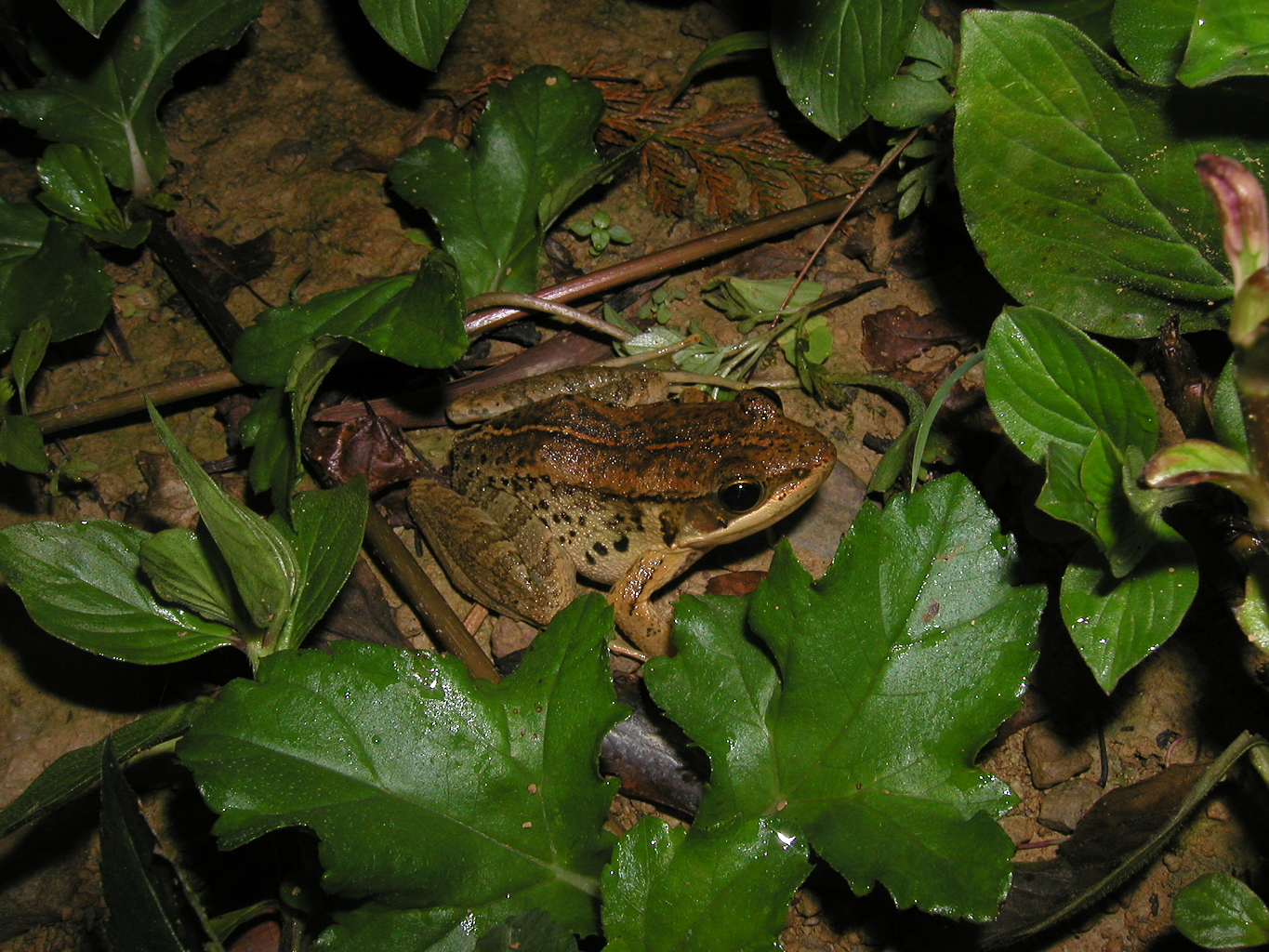

Conservation status
- Least Concern (IUCN 3.1)

Scientific classification
- Kingdom: Animalia
- Phylum: Chordata
- Class: Amphibia
- Order: Anura
- Family: Ranidae
- Genus: Nidirana
- Species: N. adenopleura

Binomial name
- Nidirana adenopleura (Boulenger, 1909)

Synonyms
- Rana adenopleura Boulenger, 1909; Hylorana adenopleura (Boulenger, 1909); Hylarana adenopleura (Boulenger, 1909); Nidirana adenopleura (Boulenger, 1909); Babina adenopleura (Boulenger, 1909); Rana caldwelli Schmidt, 1925; Babina caldwelli (Schmidt, 1925)

= Nidirana adenopleura =

Species of frog

Nidirana adenopleura is a species of frog in the family Ranidae. It is found in Taiwan, south-eastern China, and in the Yaeyama Islands (Ryukyu Islands, Japan). Populations from Yaeyama Islands might represent a distinct, as yet undescribed species. The records from Vietnam and Thailand are uncertain.

== Description ==
Nidirana adenopleura is a medium-sized frog growing to 4.5 centimetres (1.8 in) snout-vent length. Upper surfaces are light brown to brownish green; the underside is whitish. There is a light golden brown line running from the tip of nostril backward through the upper eyelid and along the dorsolateral fold to the hip. The upper jaw has a yellow stripe. The sides of the body are light brown to grayish brown, with some dark markings. The iris is golden above and reddish golden below.

Reproductive season is from March to September. Males have a loud advertisement call and start calling after sunset, and may keep on calling whole night, even continuing after sunrise. Females lay eggs near pond margins.

== Habitat and conservation ==
Nidirana adenopleura's natural habitats are paddy fields, marshes, ditches, ponds, and lakes with abundant submerged vegetation at low elevations. It is a common species not considered threatened by the International Union for Conservation of Nature (IUCN), although habitat destruction and degradation are probably threats.
